= Haifa =

City in Northern Israel

Haifa חיפה (Hebrew) حيفا (Arabic)
- City
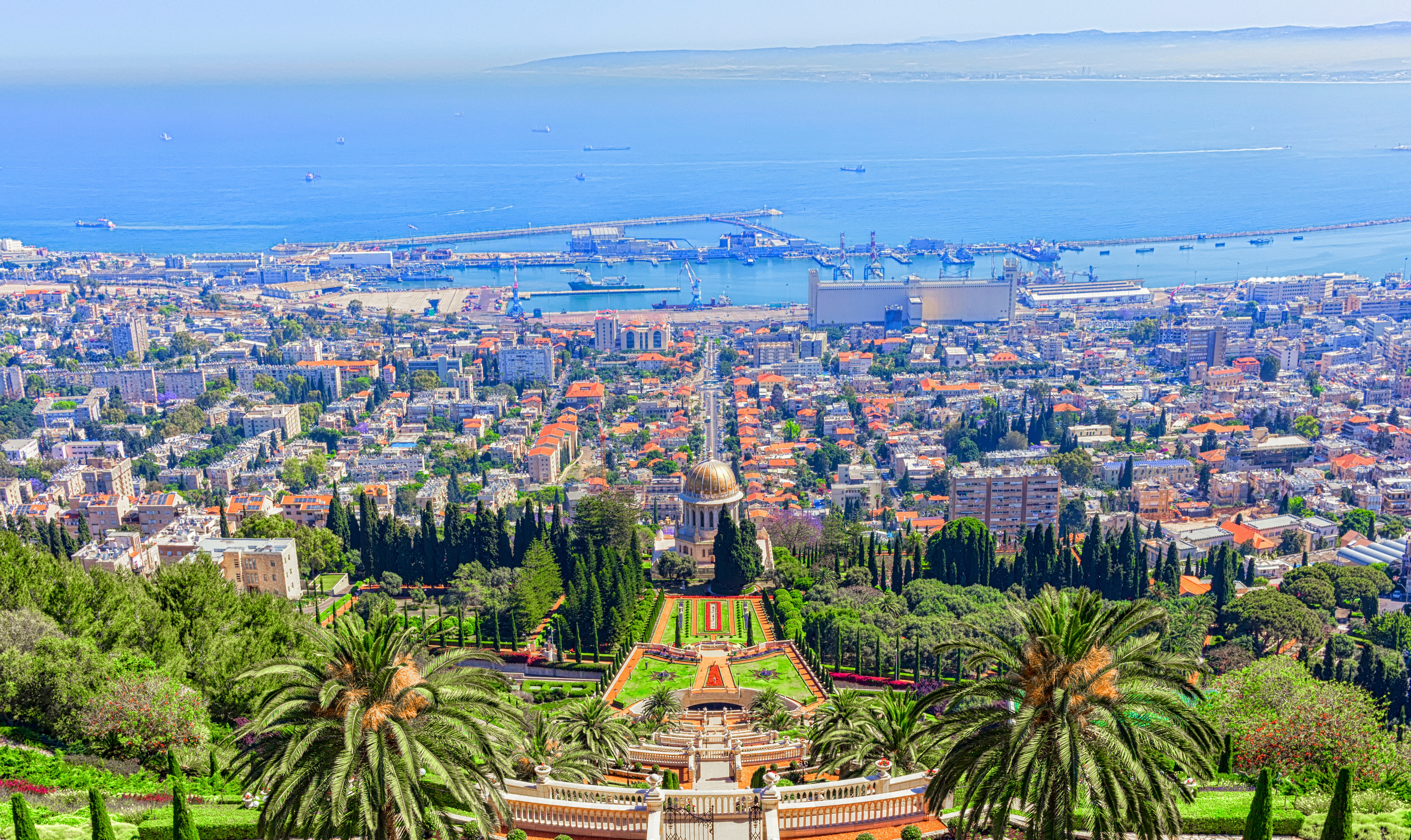
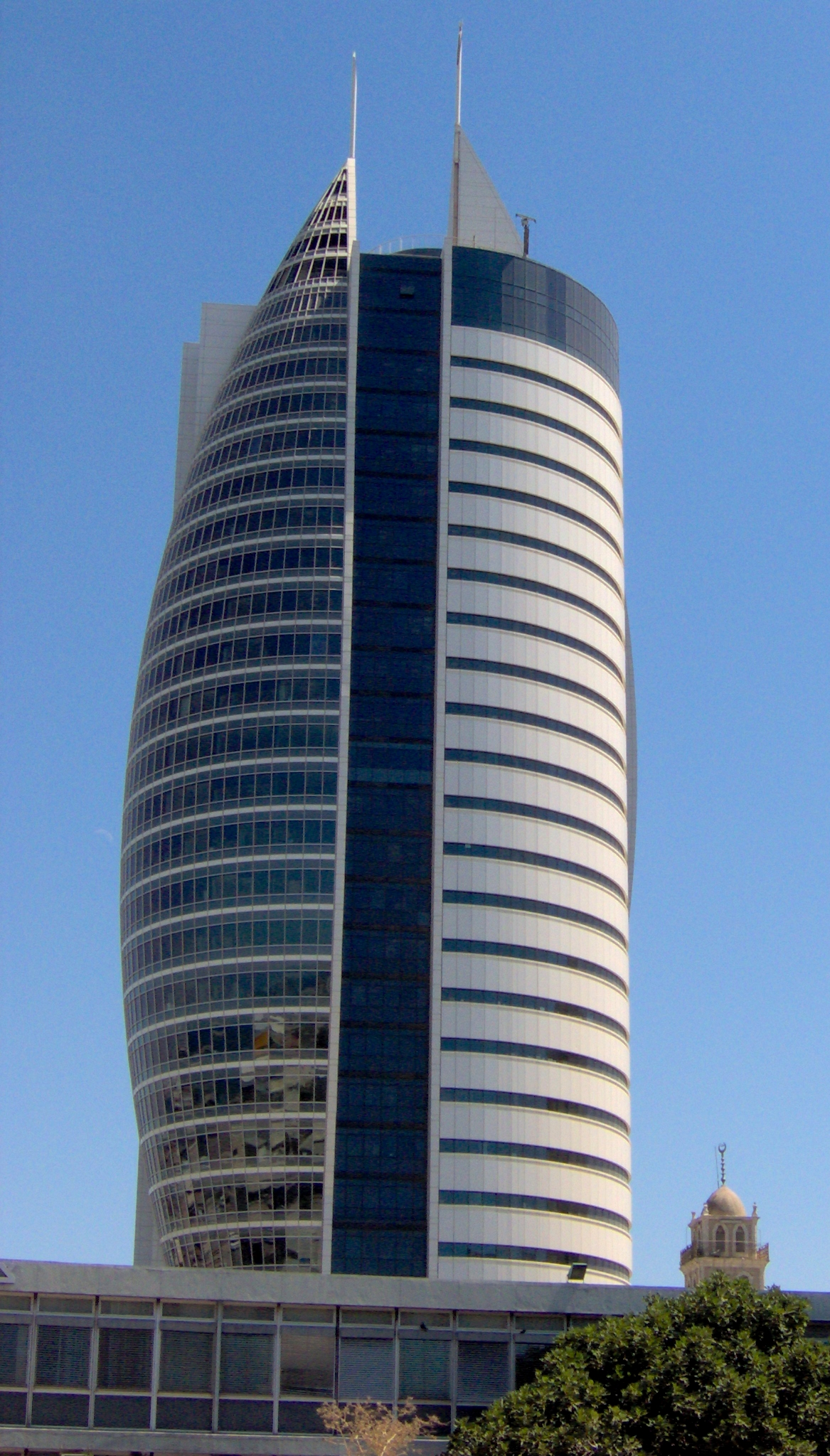
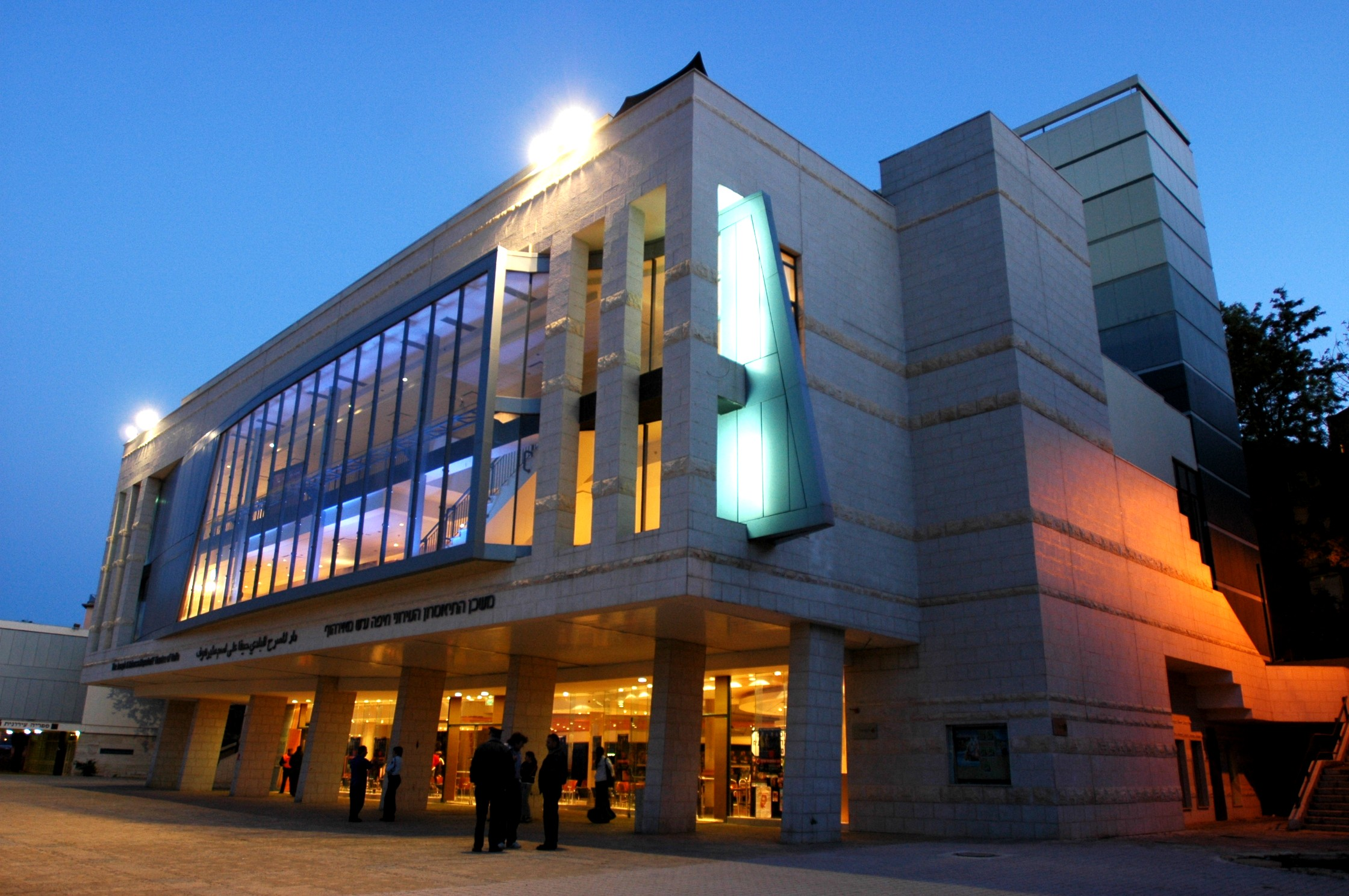
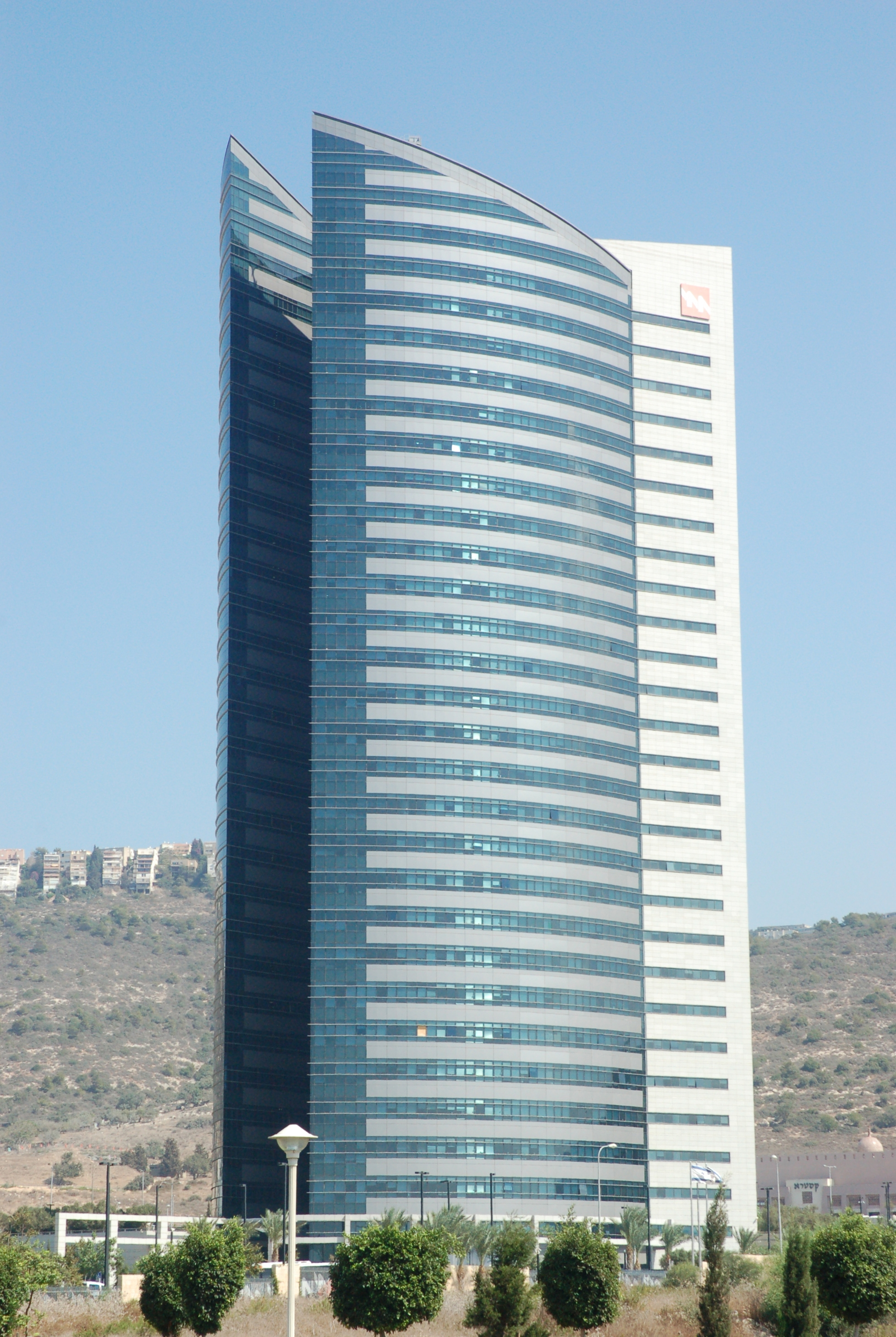
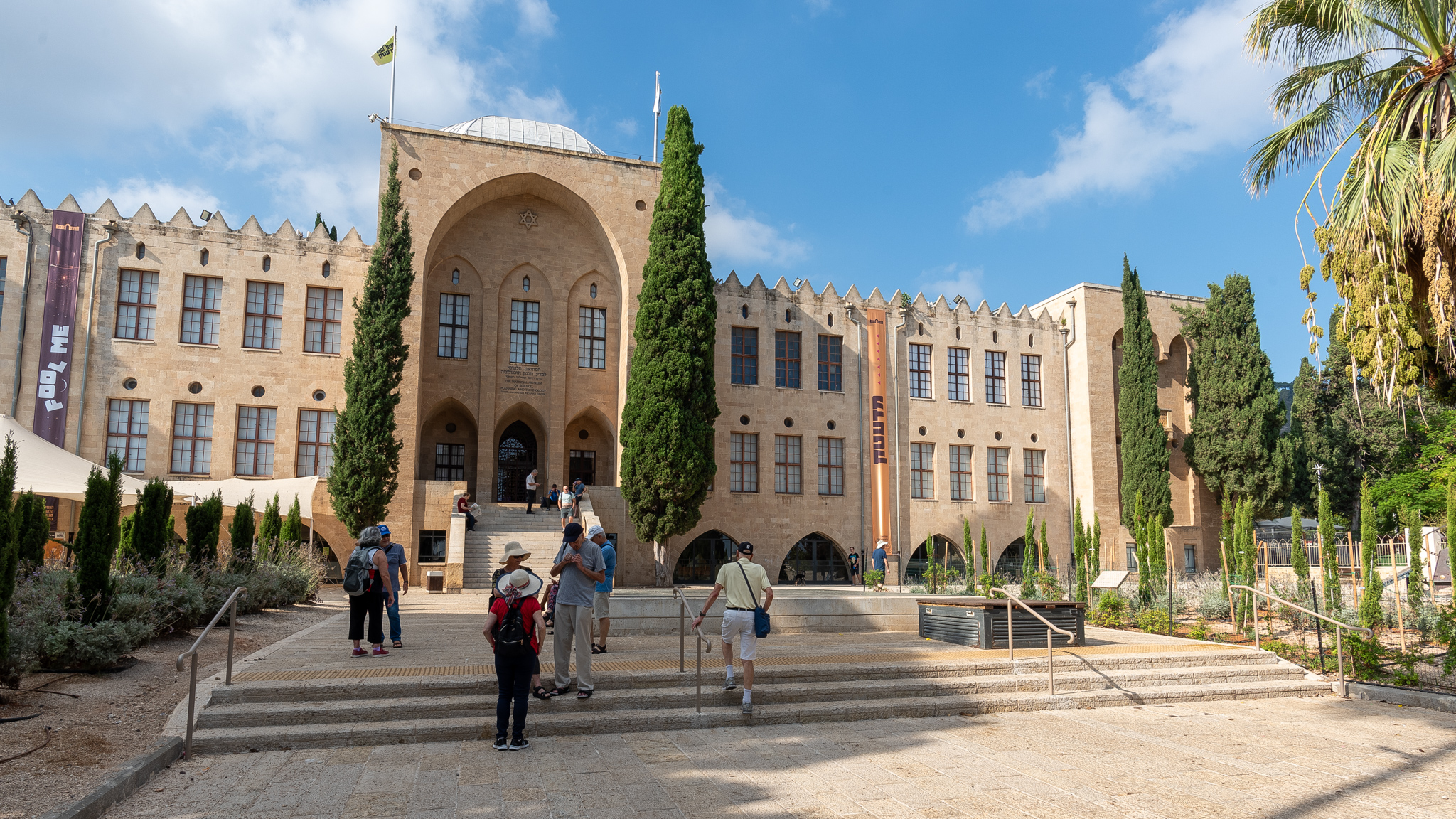
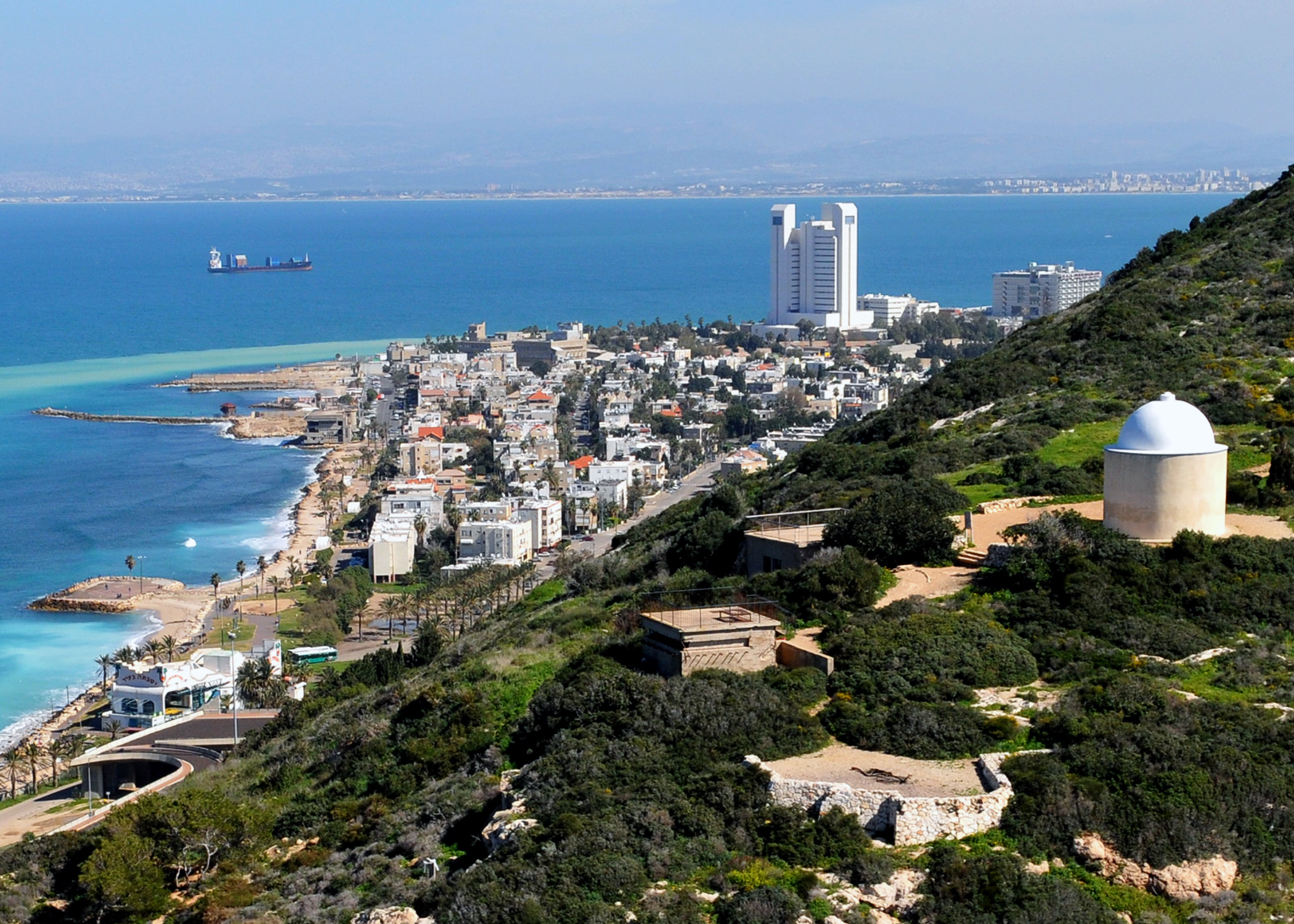
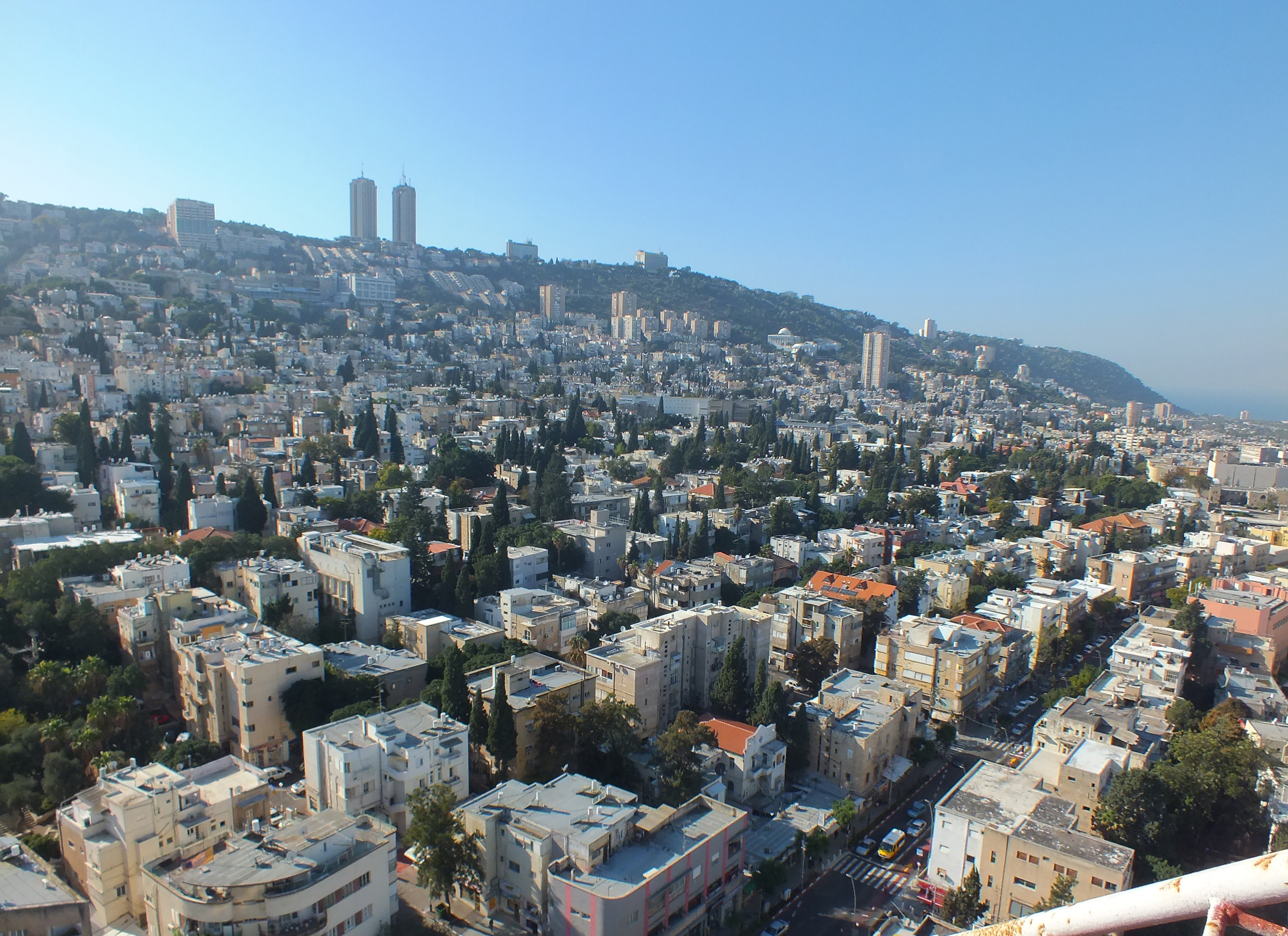
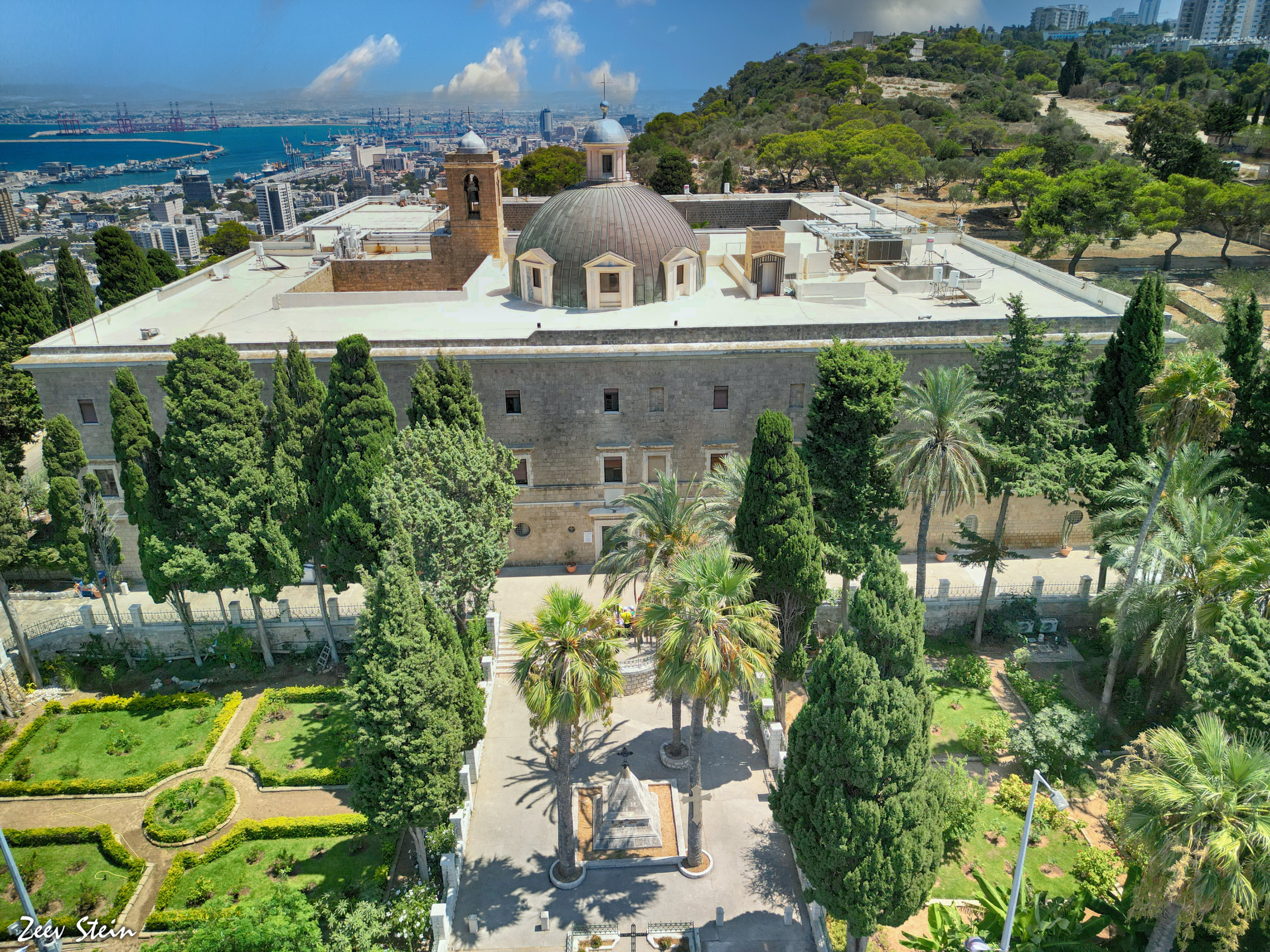
- Skyline of Haifa from the Baháʼí World Centre Sail Tower Haifa Theatre IEC Tower Madatech Bat Galim Hadar HaCarmel Stella Maris Monastery

- Flag Coat of arms

- Map of Haifa

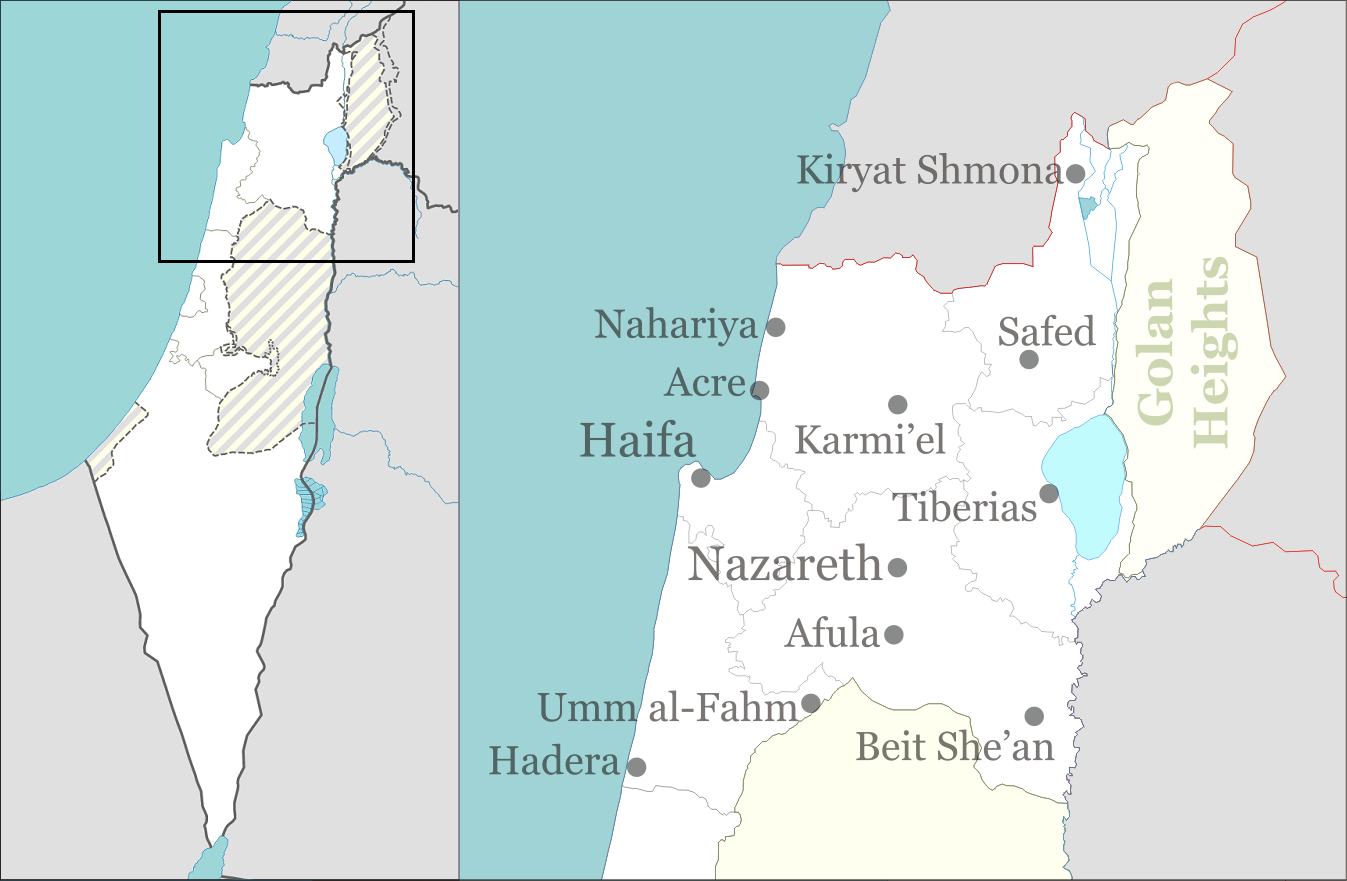
- Location in Israel Haifa (Israel)
- Coordinates: 32°49′09″N 34°59′57″E
- Grid position: 145/246 PAL
- Country: Israel
- District: Haifa
- Subdistrict: Haifa
- Founded: 1st century CE

Government
  - Type: Mayor–council
  - Body: Municipality of Haifa
  - Mayor: Yona Yahav

Area
  - City: 63,666 dunams (63.666 km^{2}; 24.582 sq mi)

Population (2024)
  - City: 297,082
  - Density: 4,666.3/km^{2} (12,086/sq mi)
  - Urban: 600,000
  - Metro: 1,050,000
- Demonym: Haifan

Ethnicity
  - Jews: 73.1%
  - Arabs: 12.1%
  - Others: 14.8%
- Time zone: UTC+2 (IST)
  - Summer (DST): UTC+3 (IDT)
- Website: www.haifa.muni.il

Haifa (/ˈhaɪfə/ HY-fə; Hebrew: חיפה, romanized: Ḥayfā, IPA: [ˈχajfa]; Arabic: حيفا, romanized: Ḥayfā, IPA: [ħaj.faː]) is the third-largest city in Israel—after Jerusalem and Tel Aviv—with a population of 297,082 in 2024. The city of Haifa forms part of the Haifa metropolitan area, the third-most populous metropolitan area in Israel. It is home to the Baháʼí Faith's Baháʼí World Centre, a UNESCO World Heritage Site and destination for Baháʼí pilgrimage.

Built on the slopes of Mount Carmel, the settlement has a history spanning more than 3,000 years. Over the millennia, the Haifa area has changed hands: being conquered and ruled by the Canaanites, Israelites, Phoenicians, Assyrians, Babylonians, Persians, Hasmoneans, Romans, Byzantines, Arabs, Crusaders, Ottomans, and the British. The earliest known settlement in the vicinity was Tell Abu Hawam, a small port city established in the Late Bronze Age (14th century BCE). In the 3rd century CE, Haifa was known as a dye-making center. Haifa el-Atika, 5 km northwest of Tell Abu Hawam, is the former site of Haifa as it existed between the 11th–18th centuries. In the late Ottoman period, in the 1760s, Haifa el-Atika was relocated 2.5 kilometres (1 1/2 miles) to the east as a new, fortified town, today known as the Old City of Haifa.

Whilst in the late 19th century the population was almost exclusively Arab, it was a mixed city during the Mandate period, with a balanced population mix of a 55% Jewish majority alongside a 45% Arab minority by 1945. During and after the Battle of Haifa in the 1948 Palestine war, most of the city's Arab population fled or were expelled and the Old City was subsequently demolished. That year, the city became part of the then-newly established state of Israel. Today it is one of Israel's mixed cities, with an Arab-Israeli population of c.10%.

As of 2016, the city is a major seaport located on Israel's Mediterranean coastline in the Bay of Haifa covering 63.7 km^{2} (24.6 sq mi). It lies about 90 km (56 mi) north of Tel Aviv and is the major regional center of northern Israel. Two respected academic institutions, the University of Haifa and the Technion – Israel Institute of Technology the oldest and top ranked university in both Israel and the Middle East, are located in Haifa, in addition to the largest K–12 school in Israel, the Hebrew Reali School. The city plays an important role in Israel's economy. It is home to Matam, one of the oldest and largest high-tech parks in the country; and prior to the opening of Tel Aviv Light Rail, Haifa was the only Israeli city with an underground rapid transit system, known as the Carmelit. Haifa Bay is a center of heavy industry, petroleum refining and chemical processing. Haifa formerly functioned as the western terminus of an oil pipeline from Iraq via Jordan.

== Etymology ==
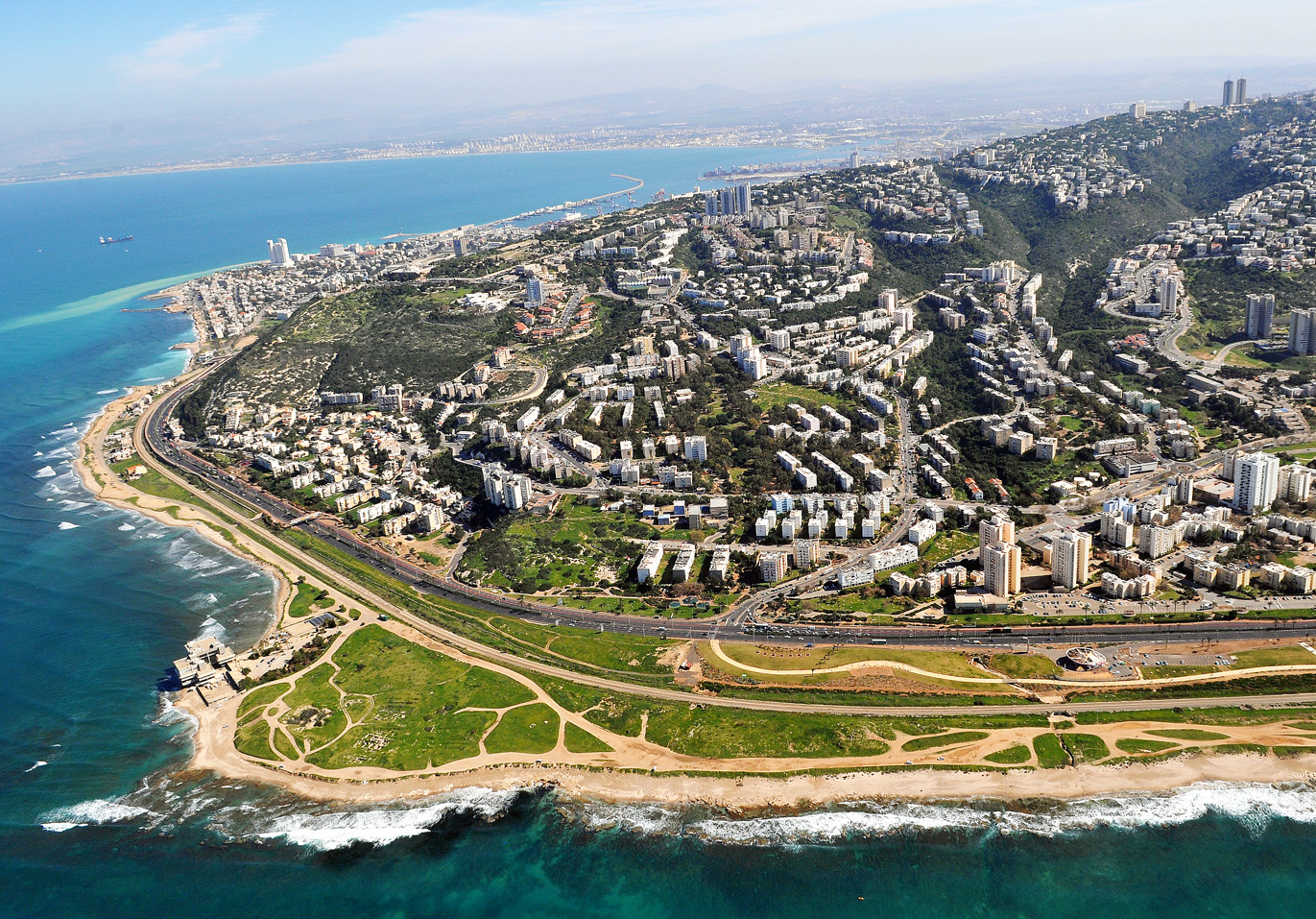
Western Haifa from the air

The ultimate origin of the name Haifa remains unclear. One theory holds it derives from the name of the high priest Caiaphas. Some Christians believe it was named for Saint Peter, whose Aramaic name was Keipha. Another theory holds it could be derived from the Hebrew verb root חפה (hafa), from H-f-h root (ח-פ-ה), meaning to cover or shield, i.e. Mount Carmel covers Haifa; others point to a possible origin in the Hebrew word חוֹף (hof), meaning 'shore', or חוֹף יָפֶה (hof yafe), meaning 'beautiful shore'.

Other spellings in English included Caipha, Kaipha, Caiffa, Kaiffa and Khaifa.

The name Efa first appears during Roman rule, some time after the end of the 1st century, when a Roman fortress and small Jewish settlement were established not far from Tell es-Samak. 'Haifa' is mentioned more than 100 times in the Talmud, a work central to Judaism. Hefa or Hepha in Eusebius of Caesarea's 4th-century work, Onomasticon, is said to be another name for Sycaminum. This synonymizing of the names is explained by Moshe Sharon, who writes that the twin ancient settlements, which he calls Haifa-Sycaminon, gradually expanded into one another, becoming a twin city known by the Greek names Sycaminon or Sycaminos Polis. References to this city end with the Byzantine period.

The Crusaders believed the name Haifa was related to Cephas, the Aramaic name of Simon Peter. Eusebius is also said to have referred to Hefa as Caiaphas civitas, while the 12th-century chronicler Benjamin of Tudela is said to have attributed the settlement's founding to Caiaphas, the Jewish high priest at the time of Jesus.

== Locations ==
Classical-era Haifa is thought to be the archaeological site of Tell Abu Hawam, about 2.5 km southeast of the Old City, which contains remains from Iron Age, Roman and Byzantine Haifa. It was abandoned by the twelfth century. Other sources suggest it may have been along the shores of the Haifa Bay, either at the site of Bat Galim or Haifa el-Atika.

Medieval Haifa, or Haifa el-Atika, is the former site of Haifa as it existed during the Fatimid (11-12th centuries), Crusader (12th–13th centuries), Mamluk (13th–16th centuries) and early Ottoman (16th–18th centuries) periods. By the late eleventh century, this new fortified settlement had developed about 5 km northwest of Tell Abu Hawam (about 2.5 km northwest of the Old City). Contemporary sources from the crusader period refer to two Haifas, an “old” and a “new” Haifa.

In the late Ottoman period, in the 1760s, Haifa el-Atika was demolished and relocated 2.5 kilometres (1 1/2 miles) to the east as a new, fortified town, today known as the Old City of Haifa. This new village, the nucleus of modern Haifa, was originally called in Arabic al-imara al-jadida (lit. 'the new construction'), though others residing there initially called it Haifa al-Jadida ('New Haifa') and then simply 'Haifa'. With the expansion of Haifa in the late 19th and 20th centuries, 'New Haifa' became known as the Old City of Haifa.

== History ==
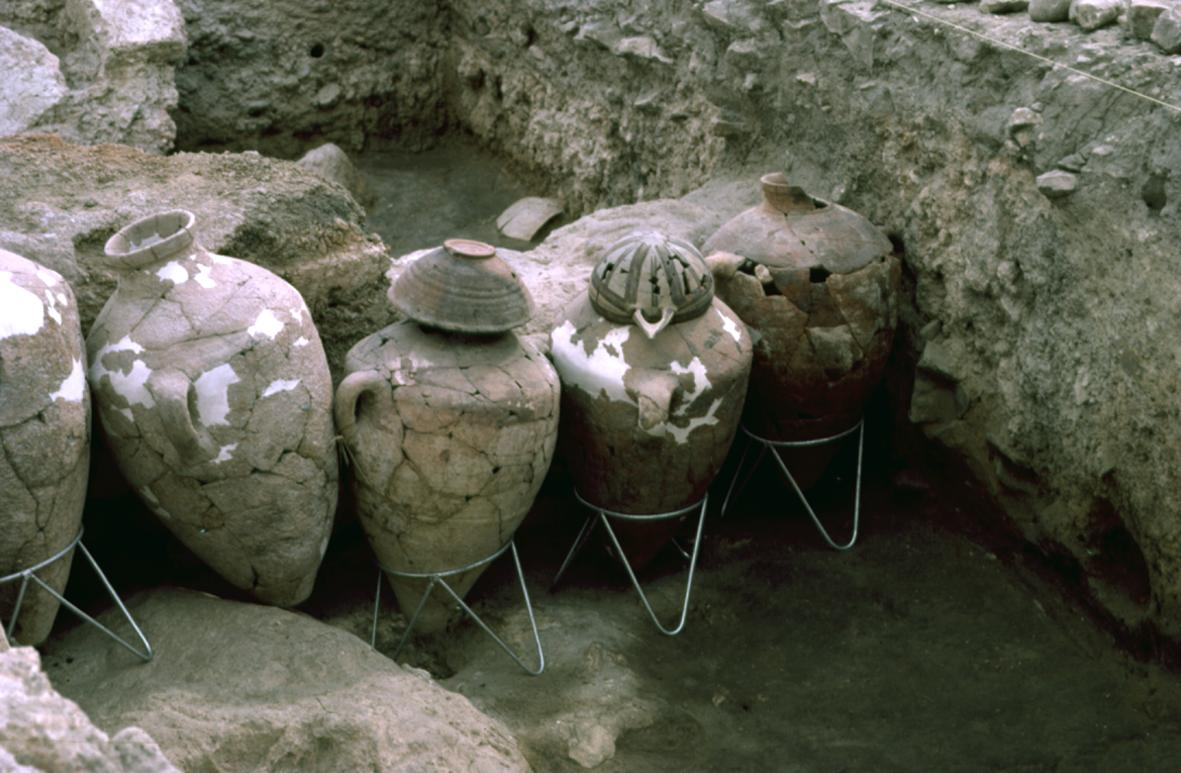
Jars excavated at Tell Abu Hawam

=== Bronze Age: Tell Abu Hawam ===
A town known today as Tell Abu Hawam was established during the Late Bronze Age (14th century BCE). It was a port and fishing village. The 6th-century BCE geographer Scylax describes a city "between the bay and the Promontory of Zeus" (i.e., Mount Carmel) which may be a reference to a settlement on the site of modern-day Haifa in the Persian period. The city moved to a new site south of what is now Bat Galim, in the Hellenistic period, after the old port became blocked with silt.

=== Roman Empire ===
In about the 3rd century CE, Haifa was first mentioned in Talmudic literature, as a Jewish fishing village and the home of Rabbi Avdimi and other Jewish scholars. According to the Talmud, fishermen caught Murex, sea snails which yielded purple dye used to make tallit (Jewish prayer shawls) from Haifa to the Ladder of the Tyrians. Tombs dating from the Roman era, including Jewish burial caves, have been found in the area.

=== Byzantine Empire ===
Under Byzantine rule, Haifa continued to grow but did not assume major importance. A kinah speaks of the destruction of the Jewish community of Haifa along with other communities when the Byzantines reconquered the country from the Sasanian Empire in 628 during the Byzantine-Sasanian War.

=== Muslim caliphates ===
Following the Arab conquest of the Levant in the 630s–40s, Haifa was largely overshadowed by the port city of 'Akka. Under the Rashidun Caliphate, Haifa began to develop.

A 25-meter-long shipwreck dating back to the seventh-century was discovered near Haifa. The ship was built using the "shell-first" method, containing the largest collection of Byzantine and early Islamic ceramics discovered in Israel. Many inscriptions in both Greek and Arabic letters, the name of Allah and numerous Christian crosses were unearthed, including 103 amphoras with 6 types of which 2 types had never been discovered previously.

In the 9th century under the Umayyad and Abbasid Caliphates, Haifa established trading relations with Egyptian ports and the city featured several shipyards. The inhabitants, Arabs and Jews, engaged in trade and maritime commerce. Glass production and dye-making from marine snails were the city's most lucrative industries. The geographer Nasir-i-Khusrau visited in 1047 and noted: "Haifa lies on the seashore, and there are here palm-gardens and trees in numbers. There are in this town shipbuilders, who build very large craft." Haifa was later mentioned by the 12th-century geographer Muhammad al-Idrisi and the 13th-century geographer Yaqut al-Hamawi.

=== Crusaders, Ayyubids and Mamluks ===
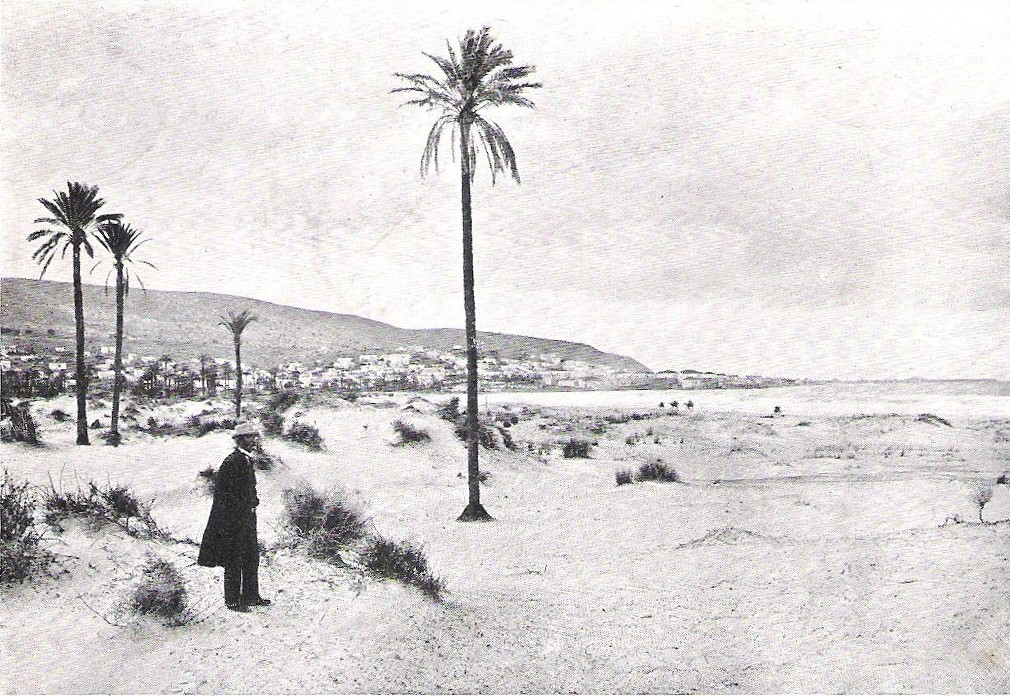
Mount Carmel before 1899

Prosperity ended in 1100 or 1101, when Haifa was besieged and blockaded by European Christians shortly after the end of the First Crusade, and then conquered after a fierce battle with its Jewish inhabitants and Fatimid garrison. Jews were the majority of the city's population at the time. Under the Crusaders, Haifa was reduced to a small fortified coastal stronghold. It was a part of the Principality of Galilee within the Kingdom of Jerusalem. Following their victory at the Battle of Hattin, Saladin's Ayyubid army captured Haifa in mid-July 1187 and the city's Crusader fortress was destroyed. The Crusaders under Richard the Lionheart retook Haifa in 1191.

In the 12th century religious hermits started inhabiting the caves on Mount Carmel, and in the 13th century they formed a new Catholic monastic order, the Carmelites. Under Muslim rule, the church which they had built on Mount Carmel was turned into a mosque, later becoming a hospital. In the 19th century, it was restored as a Carmelite monastery, the Stella Maris Monastery. The altar of the church as we see it today, stands over a cave associated with Prophet Elijah.

In 1265, the army of Mamluk sultan Baibars captured Haifa, destroying its fortifications, which had been rebuilt by King Louis IX of France, as well as the majority of the city's homes to prevent the European Crusaders from returning. From the time of its conquest by the Mamluks to the 15th century, Haifa was an unfortified small village or uninhabited. At various times there were a few Jews living there and both Jews and Christians made pilgrimages to the Cave of Elijah on Mount Carmel. During Mamluk rule in the 14th century, al-Idrisi wrote that Haifa served as the port for Tiberias and featured a "fine harbor for the anchorage of galleys and other vessels.

=== Ottoman Empire ===
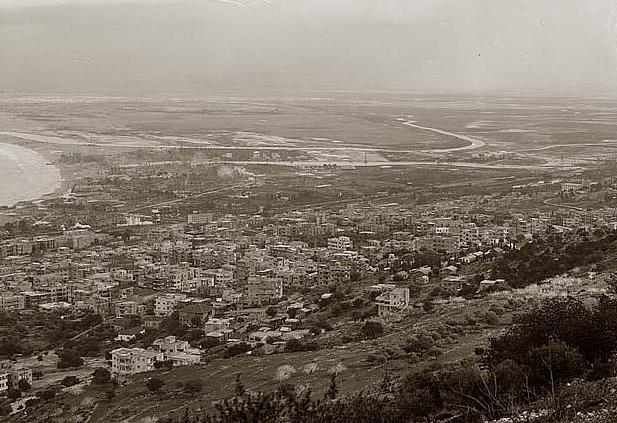
Haifa in 1898

Haifa may have been uninhabited when the Ottoman Empire conquered Palestine in 1516. In 1559, Haifa formed part of the newly-formed Lajjun Sanjak of the Damascus Eyalet. The local Bedouin emirs of the Turabay dynasty largely held the governorship of Lajjun from this point until 1677. The Turabays levied customs on the European ships which occasionally docked in the harbor of Haifa, which they also used for their own imports, namely coffee, rice and cloth. The revenues derived from Haifa ranged from 1,000 akçes in 1538 to 10,000 akçes in 1596 (1548). In 1596 (or 1548), Haifa appeared in Ottoman tax registers as being in the nahiya (subdistrict) of Sahil Atlit of the Lajjun Sanjak. It had a population of 32 Muslim households and paid taxes on wheat, barley, summer crops, olives, and goats or beehives. An early indication of its resettlement was given in a description by German traveller Leonhard Rauwolf, who visited Palestine in 1575.

The early Turabay governors did not invest in securing or building Haifa, which became a haven for Maltese pirates. During the conflict between the Turabays and the Druze governor Fakhr al-Din II of Sidon-Beirut and Safed, control of Haifa and its tower switched hands between their forces multiple times in 1623–1624, until Ahmad Bey Turabay ultimately regained control. He then demolished Haifa's tower to prevent its recapture. Due to attacks by the Maltese pirates and the conflicts between the Turabays and Fakhr al-Din, European merchants avoided trading in Haifa. To attract French merchants to the harbor, in 1631, Ahmad Bey began to rebuild and resettle Haifa and permitted the Carmelites to construct houses there. The French diplomat Laurent d'Arvieux visited the town in the 1650s and 1660s, stating that its name was pronounced locally as Hheïfa, with Europeans calling it Caïfa after Caiaphas. d'Arvieux wrote that it had once been a substantial town, evidenced by extensive surrounding ruins (including a castle and two ruined churches), but was then a small, undefended and poor town inhabited by Muslims, Jews, and a few Christians.

The English writer Richard Pococke visited in the late 1730s, writing that the name 'Hepha' came from Kepha, due to "the rocky ground it is situated on". He noted the rock-cut tombs in the area, as well as "a well-built old church entire, which might have been the cathedral... ruins of a large building, that seems to have been the castle; and... two forts, as a defence against the corsairs". In 1742, Haifa was a small village and had a Jewish community composed mainly of immigrants from Morocco and Algeria which had a synagogue. It had 250 inhabitants in 1764–5. It was located at Tell el-Semak, the site of ancient Sycaminum.

In 1761, 1765, or 1769, Daher al-Umar, Arab ruler of Acre and the Galilee, destroyed the old city (today called 'Haifa El-Atika') and rebuilt the town in a new location, surrounding it with a wall (today called the 'Old City of Haifa'). This event is marked as the beginning of the town's modern era. Giovanni Mariti visited the area in the 1760s, shortly after the city's relocation. He wrote that the inhabitants were Muslims and Greek Catholic and Greek Orthodox, and that "New Caiffa" was built with the stones of the recently vacated old town, of which "nothing is now left of it but the ruins of the metropolitan church". This event marked the beginning of modern Haifa.

In 1799, Napoleon Bonaparte captured Haifa during his brief attempt to conquer Palestine and Syria from the Ottomans, but he soon had to withdraw; in the campaign's final proclamation, Napoleon took credit for having razed the fortifications of "Kaïffa" (as the name was spelled at the time) along with those of Gaza, Jaffa and Acre.

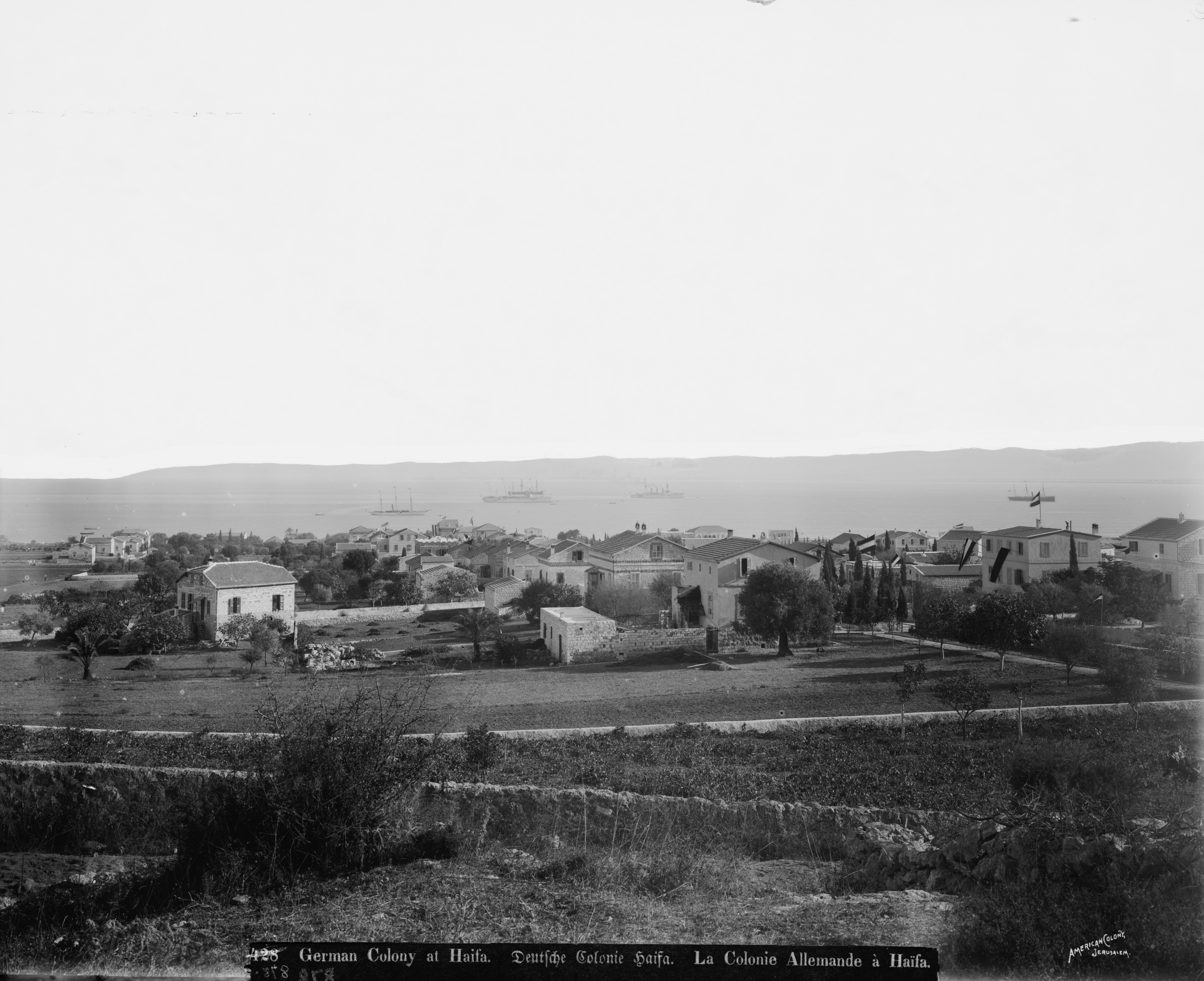
German Colony in the 19th century

Between 1831 and 1840, the Egyptian viceroy Muhammad Ali governed Haifa, after his son Ibrahim Pasha had wrested control over it from the Ottomans. When the Egyptian occupation ended and Acre declined, the importance of Haifa rose. In 1858, the walled city of Haifa was overcrowded and the first houses began to be built outside the city walls on the mountain slope. The British Survey of Western Palestine estimated Haifa's population to be about 3,000 in 1859.

Haifa remained majority Muslim throughout this time but a small Jewish community continued to exist there. In 1798, Rabbi Nachman of Breslov spent Rosh Hashanah with the Jewish community of Haifa. In 1839 the Jewish population numbered 124. Due to the growing influence of the Carmelite monks, Haifa's Christian population also grew. By 1840 approximately 40% of the inhabitants were Christian Arabs.

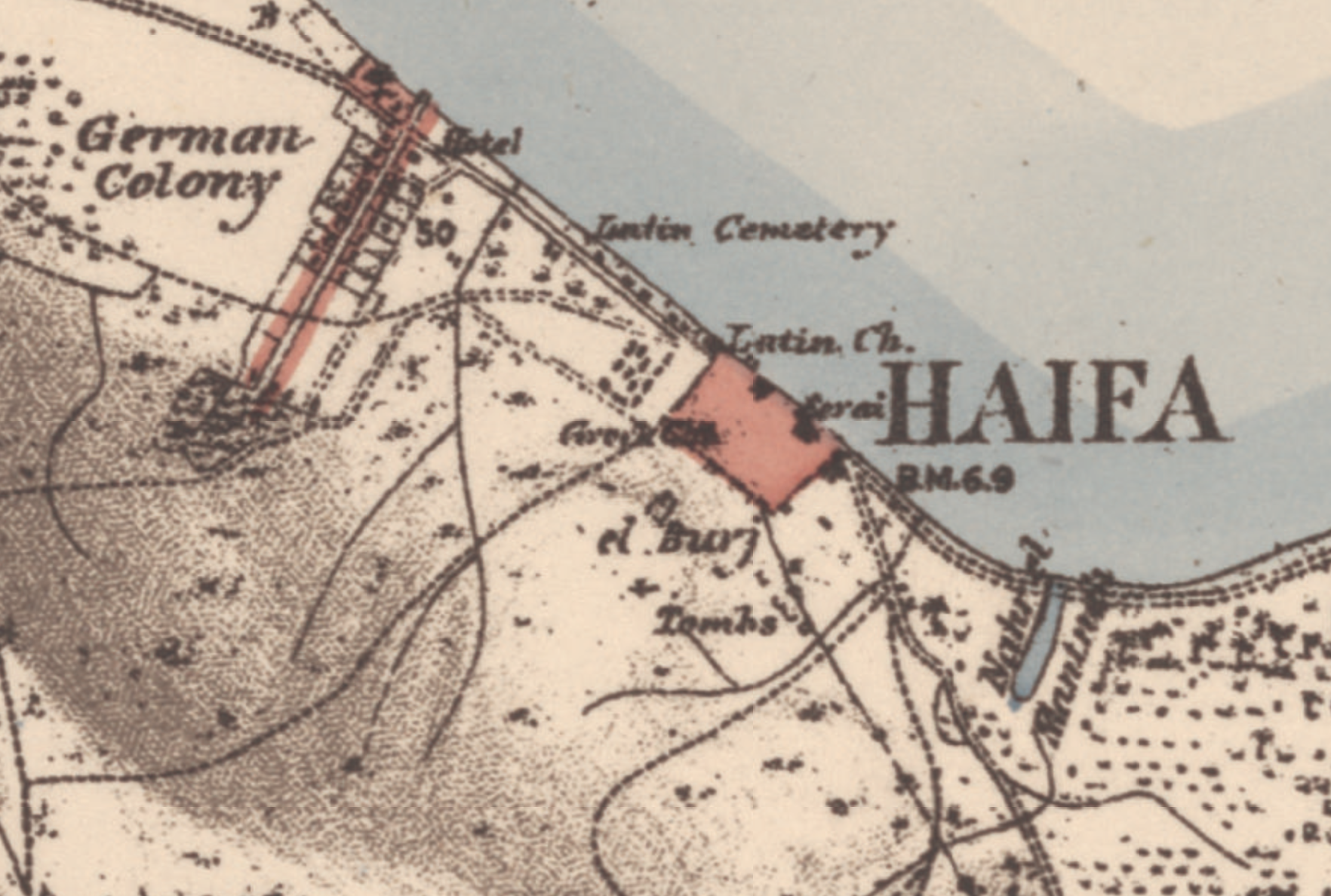
The new German Colony, Haifa is shown prominently in the 1880 PEF Survey of Palestine map.

The arrival of German messianics, many of whom were Templers, in 1868, who settled in what is now known as the German Colony, was a turning point in Haifa's development. The Templers built and operated a steam-based power station, opened factories and inaugurated carriage services to Acre, Nazareth and Tiberias, playing a key role in modernizing the city.

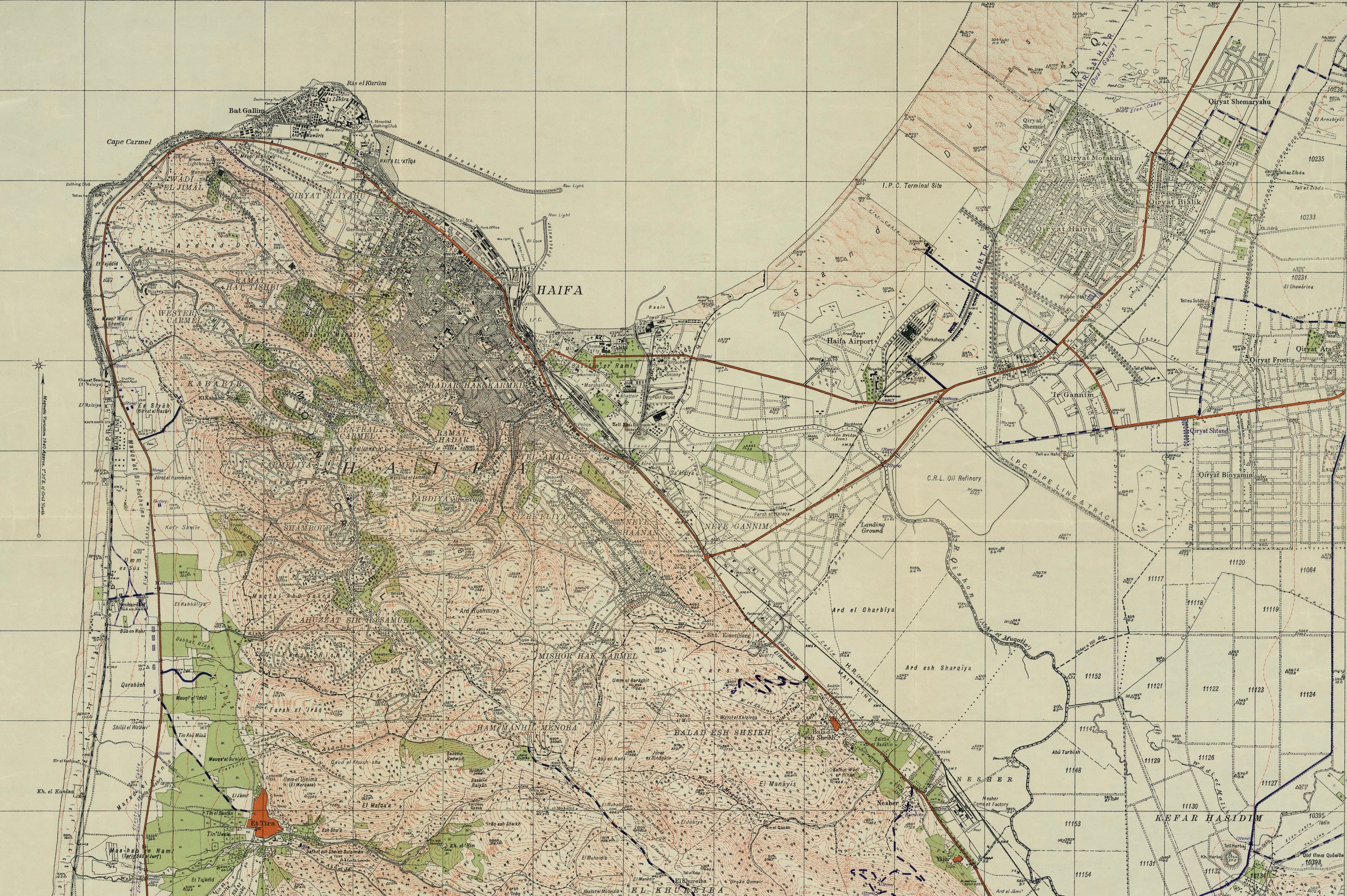
Haifa 1942 1:20,000

The first major wave of Jewish immigration to Haifa took place in the mid-19th century from Morocco, with a smaller wave of immigration from Turkey a few years later. In the 1870s, large numbers of Jewish and Arab migrants came to Haifa due to the town's growing prosperity. Jews constituted one-eighth of Haifa's population, almost all of whom were recent immigrants from Morocco and Turkey who lived in the Jewish Quarter, which was located in the eastern part of the town. Continued Jewish immigration gradually raised the Jewish population of Haifa, and included a small number of Ashkenazi families, most of whom opened hotels for Jewish migrants coming into the city. In 1875, the Jewish community of Haifa held its own census which counted the Jewish population at about 200. The First Aliyah of the late 19th century and the Second Aliyah of the early 20th century saw Jewish immigrants, mainly from Eastern Europe, arrive in Haifa in significant numbers. In particular, a significant number of Jewish immigrants from Romania settled in Haifa in the 1880s during the First Aliyah period. The Central Jewish Colonisation Society in Romania purchased over 1,000 acres (4.0 km^{2}) near Haifa. As the Jewish settlers had been city dwellers, they hired the former fellahin tenants to instruct them in agriculture. The Jewish population rose from 1,500 in 1900 to 3,000 on the eve of World War I.

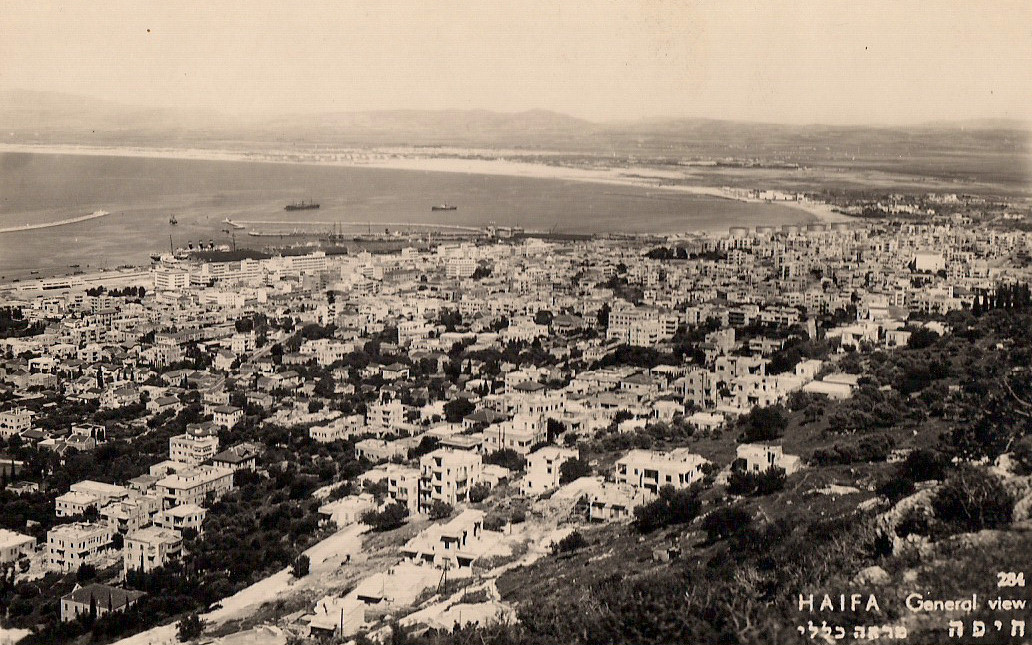
View of Haifa from Mount Carmel in 1930

In the early 20th century, Haifa began to emerge as an industrial port city and growing population center. A branch of the Hejaz Railway, known as the Jezreel Valley railway, was built between 1903 and 1905. The railway increased the city's volume of trade, and attracted workers and foreign merchants. In 1912, construction began on the Technion Institute of Technology, a Jewish technical school that was to later become one of Israel's top universities, although studies did not begin until 1924. The Jews of Haifa also founded numerous factories and cultural institutions.

==== Bahá'í faith's shrine ====
In 1909, Haifa became important to the Bahá'í Faith when the remains of the Báb, founder of the Bábí Faith and forerunner of Bahá'u'lláh in the Bahá'í Faith, were moved from Acre to Haifa and interred in the shrine built on Mount Carmel. Bahá'ís consider the shrine to be their second holiest place on Earth after the Shrine of Bahá'u'lláh in Acre. Its precise location on Mount Carmel was shown by Bahá'u'lláh himself to his eldest son, 'Abdu'l-Bahá, in 1891. 'Abdu'l-Bahá planned the structure, which was designed and completed several years later by his grandson, Shoghi Effendi. In a separate room, the remains of 'Abdu'l-Bahá were buried in November 1921.

=== British Mandate ===
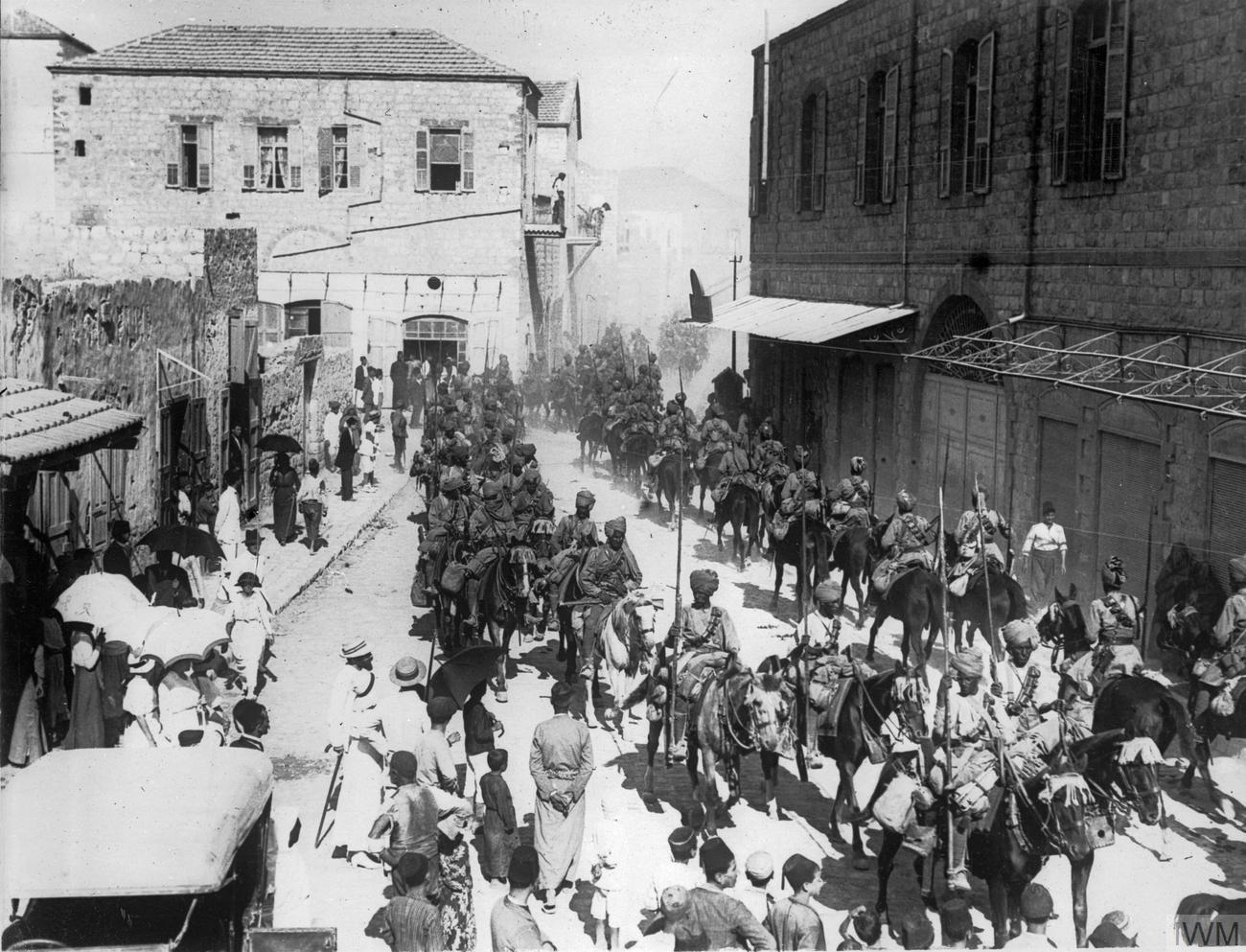
Indian troops marching in Haifa in 1918

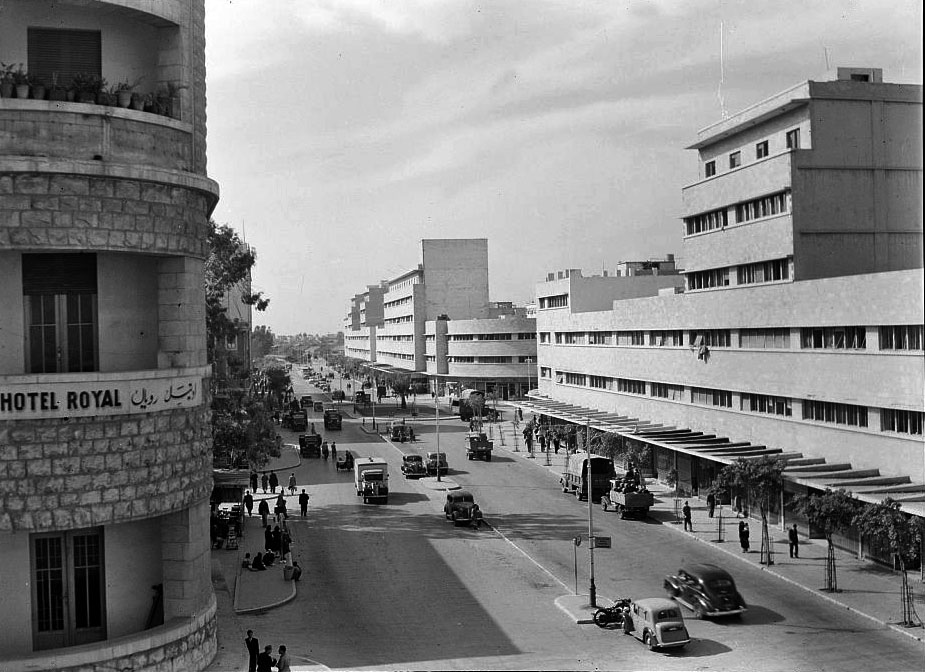
Kingsway (now HaAtzmaut Road) in the 1930s

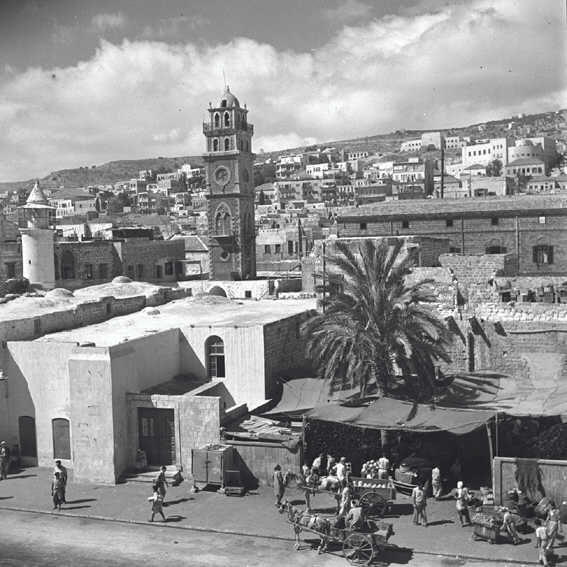
Haifa 1945

Haifa was captured from the Ottomans in September 1918 by Indian horsemen of the British Army armed with spears and swords who overran Ottoman positions. On 22 September, British troops were heading to Nazareth when a reconnaissance report was received indicating that the Turks were leaving Haifa. The British made preparations to enter the city and came under fire in the Balad al-Sheikh district (today Nesher). After the British regrouped, an elite unit of Indian horsemen were sent to attack the Turkish positions on the flanks and overrun their artillery guns on Mount Carmel.

In the early 20th century, early Ahmadi Muslims migrated to Kababir, a small suburb of Haifa, today consisting of Jews and Ahmadis. Over years the community developed and now acts as the Arab center of the community. The community broadcasts its programmes to the Arab world via the MTA 3 channel from Haifa. Kababir is also known for its Mahmood mosque, a unique architectural landmark.

Under the British Mandate, Haifa saw large-scale development and became an industrial port city. The Baháʼí Faith in 1918 and today has its administrative and spiritual center in the environs of Haifa. Many Jewish immigrants of the Fourth Aliyah and Fifth Aliyah settled in Haifa. The port was a major source of income, and the nearby Jewish towns of the Krayot were established in the 1930s. At the same time, the Arab population also swelled due to an influx of migrants, coming mainly from surrounding villages as well as the Syrian Hauran. The Arab immigration mainly came as a result of prices and salary drop. The 1922 census of Palestine, conducted by the British authorities, recorded Haifa's population as 24,634 (9,377 Muslims, 8,863 Christians, 6,230 Jews, 152 Baháʼí, and 12 Druze). By the time of the 1931 census of Palestine, this had increased to 50,403 (20,324 Muslims, 15,923 Jews, 13,824 Christians, 196 Baháʼí, 126 Druze, and 10 with no religion). Between the censuses of 1922 and 1931, the Muslim, Jewish, and Christian populations rose by 217%, 256%, and 156%, respectively. In 1938, 99,000 people (including 48,000 Jews) lived in Haifa.

Haifa's development owed much to British plans to make it a central port and hub for Middle-East crude oil. The British Government of Palestine developed the port and built refineries, thereby facilitating the rapid development of the city as a center for the country's heavy industries. Haifa was also among the first towns to be fully electrified. The Palestine Electric Company inaugurated the Haifa Electrical Power Station already in 1925, opening the door to considerable industrialization. The State-run Palestine Railways also built its main workshops in Haifa.

During World War II, the city was repeatedly hit during the Italian bombing of Mandatory Palestine, with the port and refineries being major targets.

By 1945 the population was 138,300 (75,500 Jews, 35,940 Muslims, 26,570 Christians, and 290 "other"). In 1947, about 70,910 Arabs (41,000 Muslims and 29,910 Christians) and 74,230 Jews were living there. The Christian community were mostly Greek-Melkite Catholics.

==== 1947–1948 Civil War in Palestine ====
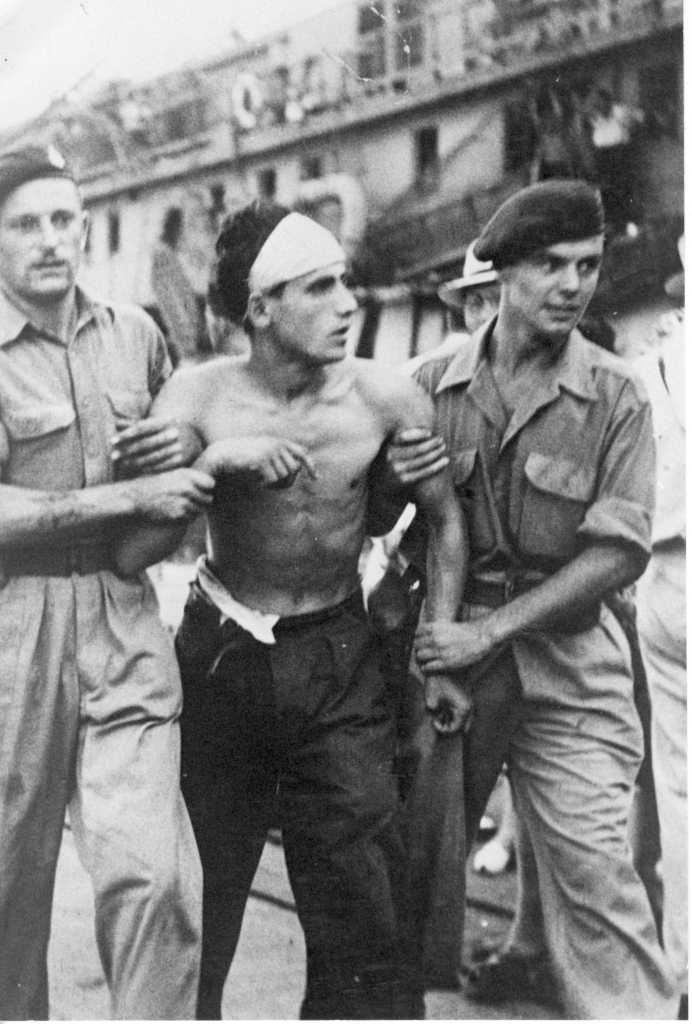
Haifa July 1947. British soldiers remove injured passenger from SS Exodus

The 1947 UN Partition Plan in late November 1947 designated Haifa as part of the proposed Jewish state. Arab protests over that decision evolved into violence between Jews and Arabs that left several dozen people dead during December. The Arab city was in a state of chaos. The local Arab national committee tried to stabilize the situation by organizing garrison, calming the frightened residents and to stop the flight. In a public statement, the national committee called upon the Arab residents to obey orders, be alert, and keep calm, adding, "Keep away the cowards who wish to flee. Expell them from your lines. Despise them, because they harm more than the enemy". Despite the efforts, Arab residents abandoned the streets which bordered Jewish neighborhoods and during the days of the general strike instigated by the Arab Higher Committee, some 250 Arab families abandoned the Khalisa neighborhood.

On 30 December 1947, members of the Irgun, a Jewish underground militia, threw bombs into a crowd of Arabs outside the gates of the Consolidated Refineries in Haifa, killing six and injuring 42. In response, Arab employees of the company killed 39 Jewish employees in what became known as the Haifa Oil Refinery massacre. The Jewish Haganah militia retaliated with a raid on the Arab village of Balad al-Shaykh, where many of the Arab refinery workers lived, in what became known as the Balad al-Shaykh massacre.

British forces in Haifa redeployed on 21 April 1948, withdrawing from most of the city while still maintaining control over the port facilities. According to Ilan Pappé, although the Jewish mayor of the city, Shabtai Levy, urged the Arab residents to stay, in other parts of town loudspeakers could be heard ordering Arabs to leave "before it's too late."

On 21 April, the downtown, controlled by a combination of local and foreign (ALA) Arab irregulars, was assaulted by Jewish forces in Operation Bi'ur Hametz by the Carmeli Brigade of the Haganah, commanded by Moshe Carmel. Arab neighborhoods were attacked with mortars and gunfire, which, according to Ilan Pappé, culminated in an attack on a Palestinian crowd in the old marketplace using three-inch (76 mm) mortars on 22 April 1948.

Rashid al-Haj Ibrahim, a Palestinian Arab municipal leader, described attacks "provoking terror among the women and children, who were very influenced by the horrors of Dayr Yasin", and provided an eyewitness account of the flight of Haifa's Arab residents:

Thousands of women, children and men hurried to the port district in a state of chaos and terror without precedent in the history of the Arab nation. They fled their houses to the coast, barefoot and naked, to wait for their turn to travel to Lebanon. They left their homeland, their houses, their possessions, their money, their welfare, and their trades, to surrender their dignity and their souls.

The operation led to a massive displacement of Haifa's Arab population, and was part of the larger 1948 Palestinian expulsion and flight. According to The Economist at the time, only 5,000–6,000 of the city's 62,000 Arabs remained there by 2 October 1948. Morris quotes British sources as stating that during the battles between 22 and 23 April 100 Arabs were killed and 100 wounded, but he adds that the total may have been higher.

Historian Walid Khalidi described "the mass exodus of Haifa’s Arab population" as "the spontaneous reaction to the ruthless combination of terror and psychological warfare tactics adopted by the Haganah during the attack."

=== Israel ===
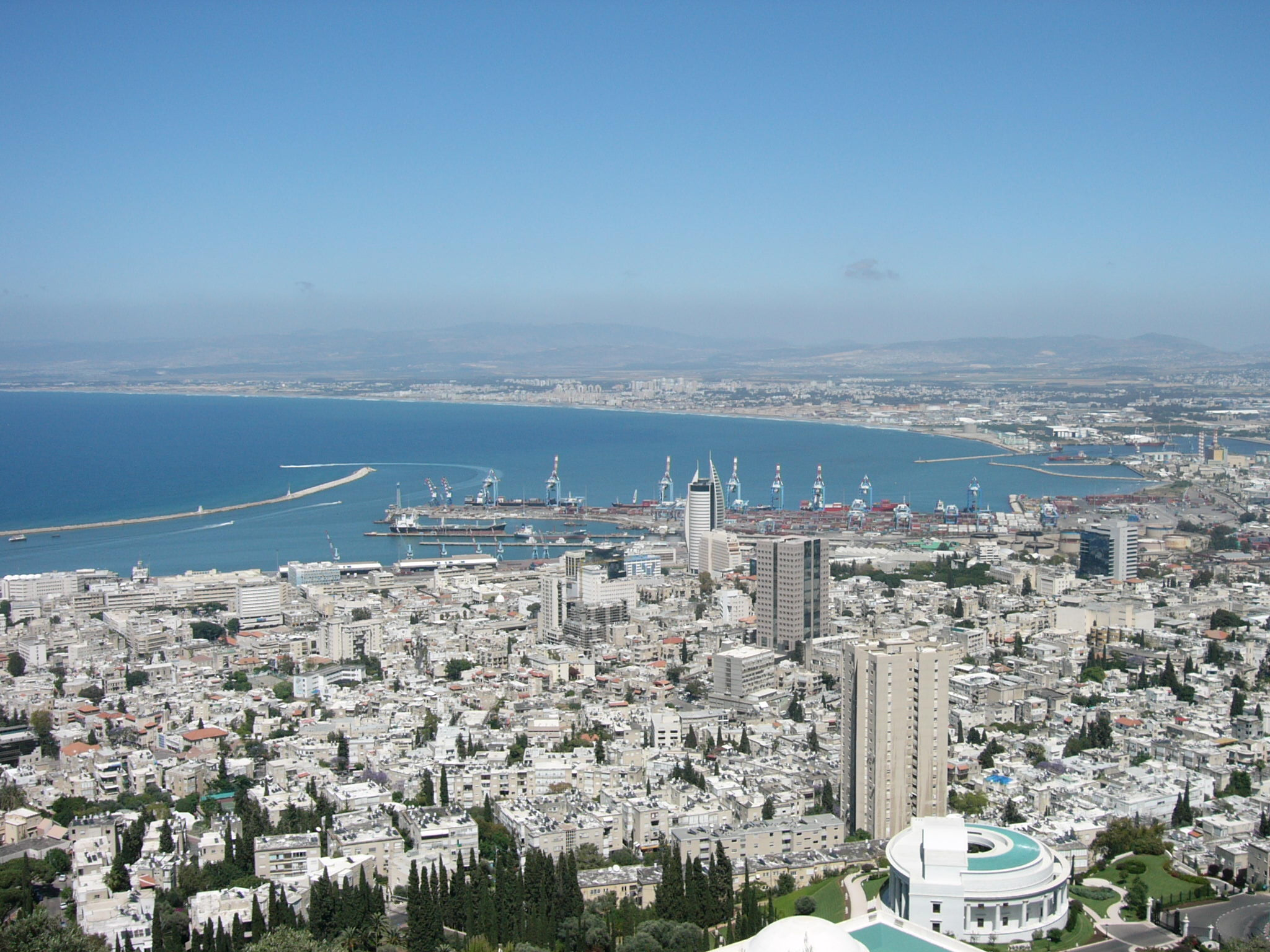
View of Haifa Bay from Mount Carmel in 2004

==== 20th century ====
After the Declaration of the Establishment of the State of Israel on 14 May 1948 Haifa became the gateway for Jewish immigration into Israel. During the 1948 Arab–Israeli War, the neighborhoods of Haifa were sometimes contested. After the war, Jewish immigrants were settled in new neighborhoods, among them Kiryat Hayim, Ramot Remez, Ramat Shaul, Kiryat Sprinzak, and Kiryat Eliezer. Bnei Zion Hospital (formerly Rothschild Hospital) and the Central Synagogue in Hadar HaCarmel date from this period. In 1953, a master plan was created for transportation and the future architectural layout. In 1959, a group of Sephardi and Mizrahi Jews, mostly Moroccan Jews, rioted in Wadi Salib, claiming the state was discriminating against them. Their demand for "bread and work" was directed at the state institutions and what they viewed as an Ashkenazi elite in the Labor Party and the Histadrut.

Tel Aviv gained in status, while Haifa suffered a decline in the role as regional capital. The opening of Ashdod as a port exacerbated this. Tourism shrank when the Israeli Ministry of Tourism placed emphasis on developing Tiberias as a tourist center. Nevertheless, Haifa's population had reached 200,000 by the early 1970s, and mass immigration from the former Soviet Union boosted the population by a further 35,000. The Matam high-tech park, the first dedicated high-tech park in Israel, opened in Haifa in the 1970s. Many of Wadi Salib's historic Ottoman buildings have now been demolished, and in the 1990s a major section of the Old City was razed to make way for a new municipal center.

==== 21st century ====
From 1999 to 2003, several Palestinian suicide attacks took place in Haifa (in Maxim and Matza restaurants, bus 37, and others), killing 68 civilians. In 2006, Haifa was hit by 93 Hezbollah rockets during the Second Lebanon War, killing 11 civilians and leading to half of the city's population fleeing at the end of the first week of the war. Among the places hit by rockets were a train depot and the oil refinery complex.

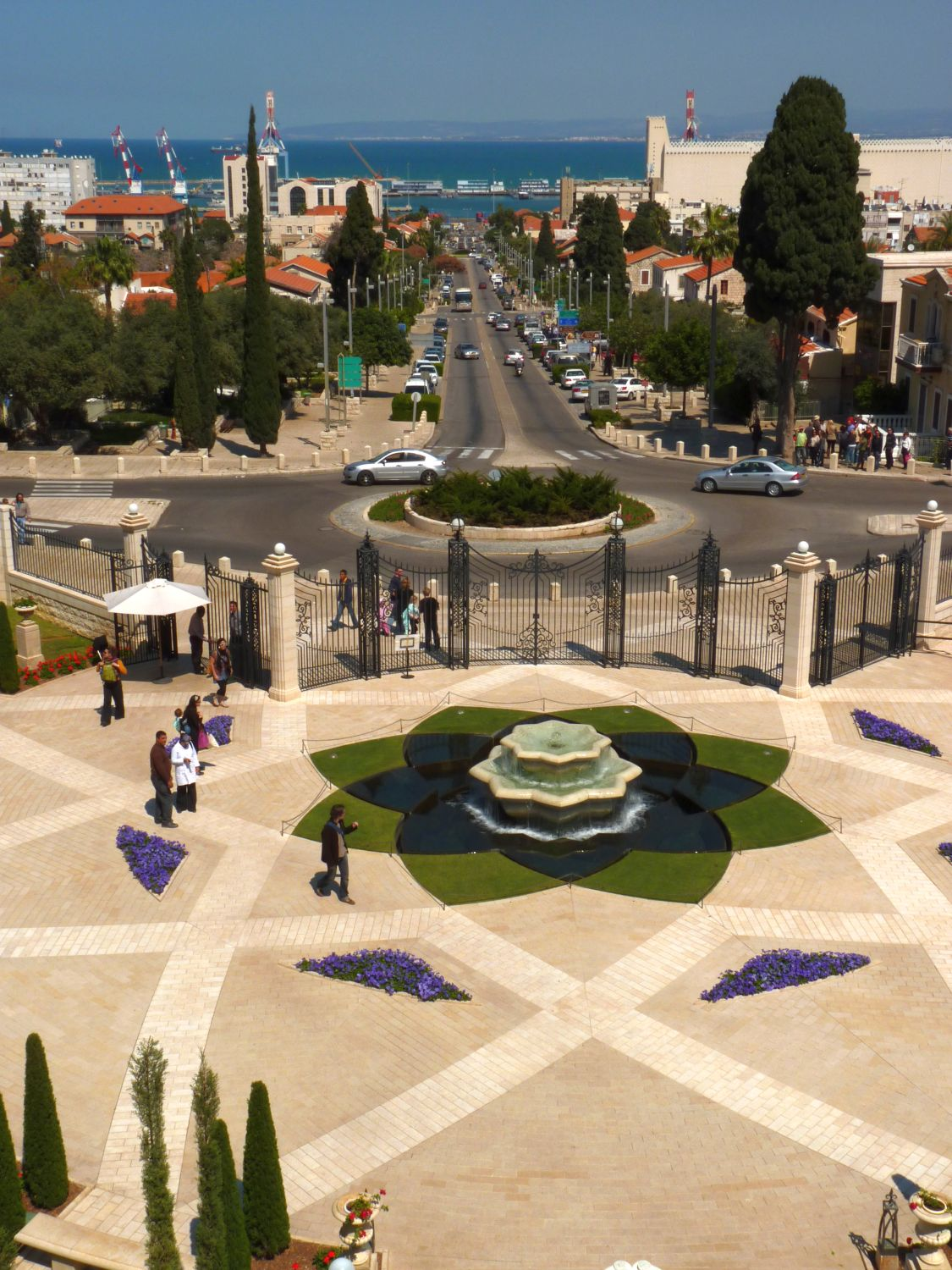
Ben-Gurion Avenue and the German Colony

Recently, residential construction has been concentrated around Kiryat Haim and Kiryat Shmuel, with 75,000 m^{2} (807,293 sq ft) of new residential construction between 2002 and 2004, the Carmel, with 70,000 m^{2} (753,474 sq ft), and Ramot Neve Sha'anan with approximately 70,000 m^{2} (753,474 sq ft) Non-residential construction was highest in the Lower Town, (90,000 sq m), Haifa Bay (72,000 sq m) and Ramot Neve Sha'anan (54,000 sq m). In 2004, 80% of construction in the city was private.

Currently, the city has a modest number of skyscrapers and high-rise buildings. Though buildings rising up to 20 stories were built on Mount Carmel in the past, the Haifa municipality banned the construction of any new buildings taller than nine stories on Mount Carmel in July 2012.

The neighborhood of Wadi Salib, located in the heart of downtown Haifa, is being redeveloped. Most of its Jewish and Arab residents are considered squatters and have been gradually evicted over the years. The Haifa Economic Corporation Ltd is developing two 1,000 square meter lots for office and commercial use. Some historic buildings have been renovated and redeveloped, especially into nightclubs and theaters, such as the Palace of the Pasha, a Turkish bathhouse, and a Middle Eastern music and dance club, which has been converted into theaters and offices.

In 2012, a new, massive development plan was announced for Haifa's waterfront. According to the plan, the western section of the city's port will be torn down, and all port activity will be moved to the east. The west side of the port will be transformed into a tourism and nightlife center and a point of embarkation and arrival for sea travel through the construction of public spaces, a beach promenade, and the renovation of commercial buildings. The train tracks that currently bisect the city and separate the city's beach from the rest of Haifa will also be buried. A park will be developed on the border of the Kishon River, the refineries' cooling towers will be turned into a visitors' center, and bridges will lead from the port to the rest of the city. Massive renovations are also currently underway in Haifa's lower town, in the Turkish market and Paris Square, which will become the city's business center. In addition, the ammonia depository tank in the Haifa bay industrial zone will be dismantled, and a new one built in an alternative location.

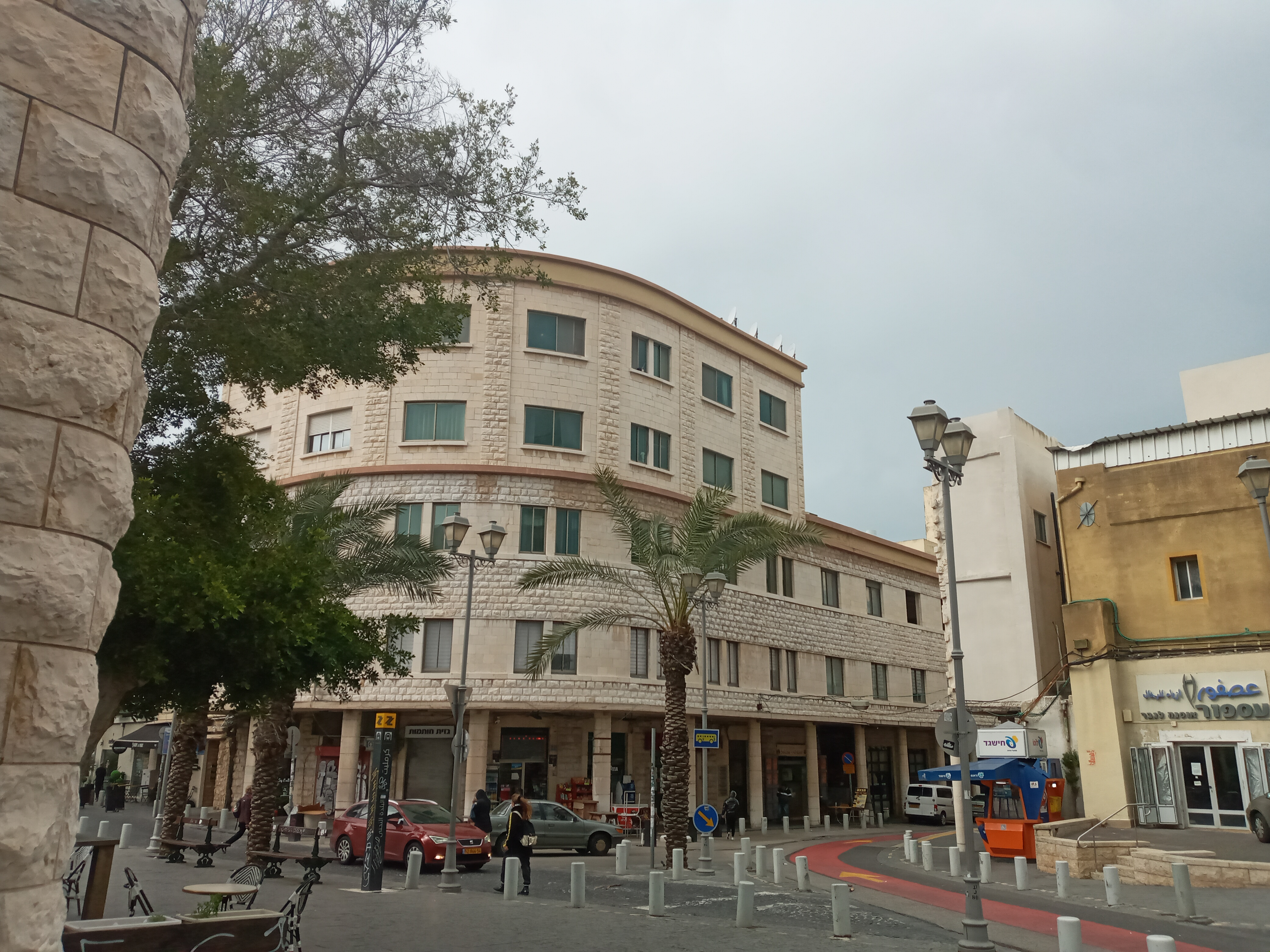
The Carmelite Compound in Paris Square

Another plan seeks to turn the western section of Haifa Port into a major tourism and nightlife center, as well as a functioning point of embarkation and arrival for sea travel. All port activity will be moved to the western side, and the area will be redeveloped. Public spaces and a beach promenade will be developed, and commercial buildings will be renovated. As part of the development plans, the Israeli Navy, which has a large presence in Haifa, will withdraw from the shoreline between Bat Galim and Hof Hashaket. A 5 km (3.1 mi) long esplanade which will encircle the shoreline will be constructed. It will include a bicycle path, and possibly also a small bridge under which navy vessels will pass on their way to the sea.

In addition, a 50,000-square-metre (540,000 sq ft) entertainment complex that will contain a Disney theme park, cinemas, shops, and a 25-screen Multiplex theater will be built at the Check Post exit from the Carmel Tunnels. In 2014, a new major plan for the city was proposed, under which extensive development of residential, business, and leisure areas will take place with the target of increasing the city's population by 60,000 by 2025. Under the plan, five new neighborhoods will be built, along with new high-tech parks. In addition, existing employment centers will be renovated, and new leisure areas and a large park will be built.

A development plan approved in 2016 seeks to raise Haifa's population to 330,000 residents by 2025. The plan included a new main downtown business district, the creation of a park in a current industrial area, new construction and renovation of public buildings and hubs of higher education, tourism, culture, commerce, leisure, and residence.

On April 5, during the 2026 Iran War, four civilians were killed when a direct strike by an Iranian missile on their residential building caused a partial collapse. The individuals were in a stairwell and had not made it into a shelter in the building. After a failed missile interception, the Iranian projectile struck the six-story building without exploding, causing the structure's upper floors to collapse.

== Demographics ==
City of Haifa population by year
Year	Pop.	±%
1800	1,000	—
1840	2,000	+100.0%
1880	6,000	+200.0%
1914	20,000	+233.3%
1922	24,600	+23.0%
1947	145,140	+490.0%
1961	183,021	+26.1%
1972	219,559	+20.0%
1983	225,775	+2.8%
1995	255,914	+13.3%
2008	264,407	+3.3%
2016	279,600	+5.7%
2024	297,082	+6.3%

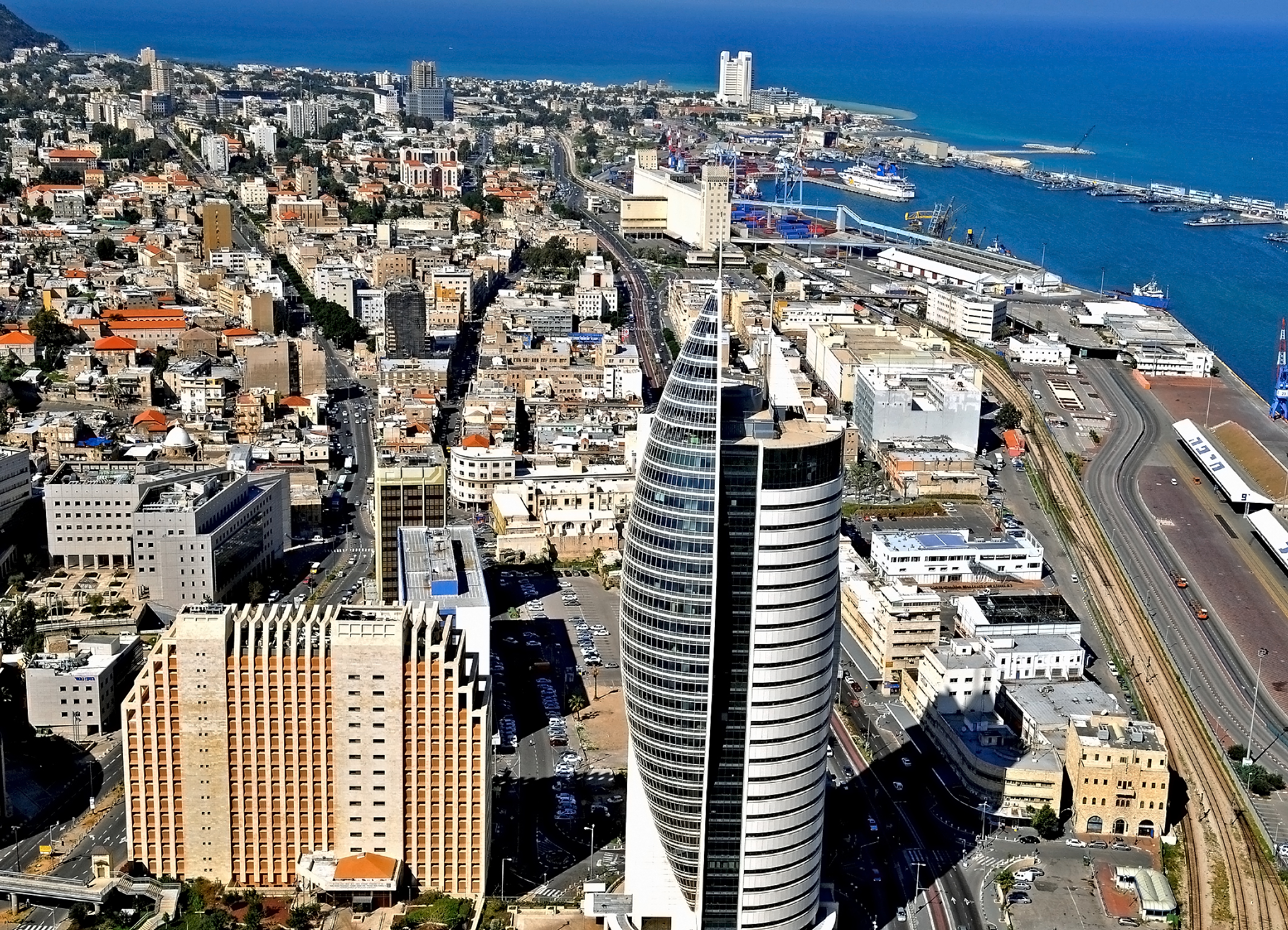
Downtown Haifa and port with the Sail Tower in the foreground

Haifa is Israel's third-largest city, consisting of 103,000 households, or a population of 297,082. Immigrants from the former Soviet Union constitute 25% of Haifa's population, thus making Russian one of the three main spoken languages of the city.

According to the Israeli Central Bureau of Statistics, Israeli Arabs constitute 10% of Haifa's population, the majority living in the Wadi Nisnas, Abbas and Khalisa neighborhoods. The Wadi Nisnas and Abbas neighborhoods are largely Christian, Khalisa and Kababir are largely Muslim, while Ein HaYam is a mixed Arab Christian and Muslim neighborhood. Haifa is commonly portrayed as a model of co-existence between Arabs and Jews, although tensions and hostility do still exist.

Between 1994 and 2009, the city had a declining and aging population compared to Tel Aviv and Jerusalem, as young people moved to the center of the country for education and jobs, while young families migrated to bedroom communities in the suburbs. However, as a result of new projects and improving infrastructure, the city managed to reverse its population decline, reducing emigration while attracting more internal migration into the city. In 2009, positive net immigration into the city was shown for the first time in 15 years.

=== Religious and ethnic communities ===
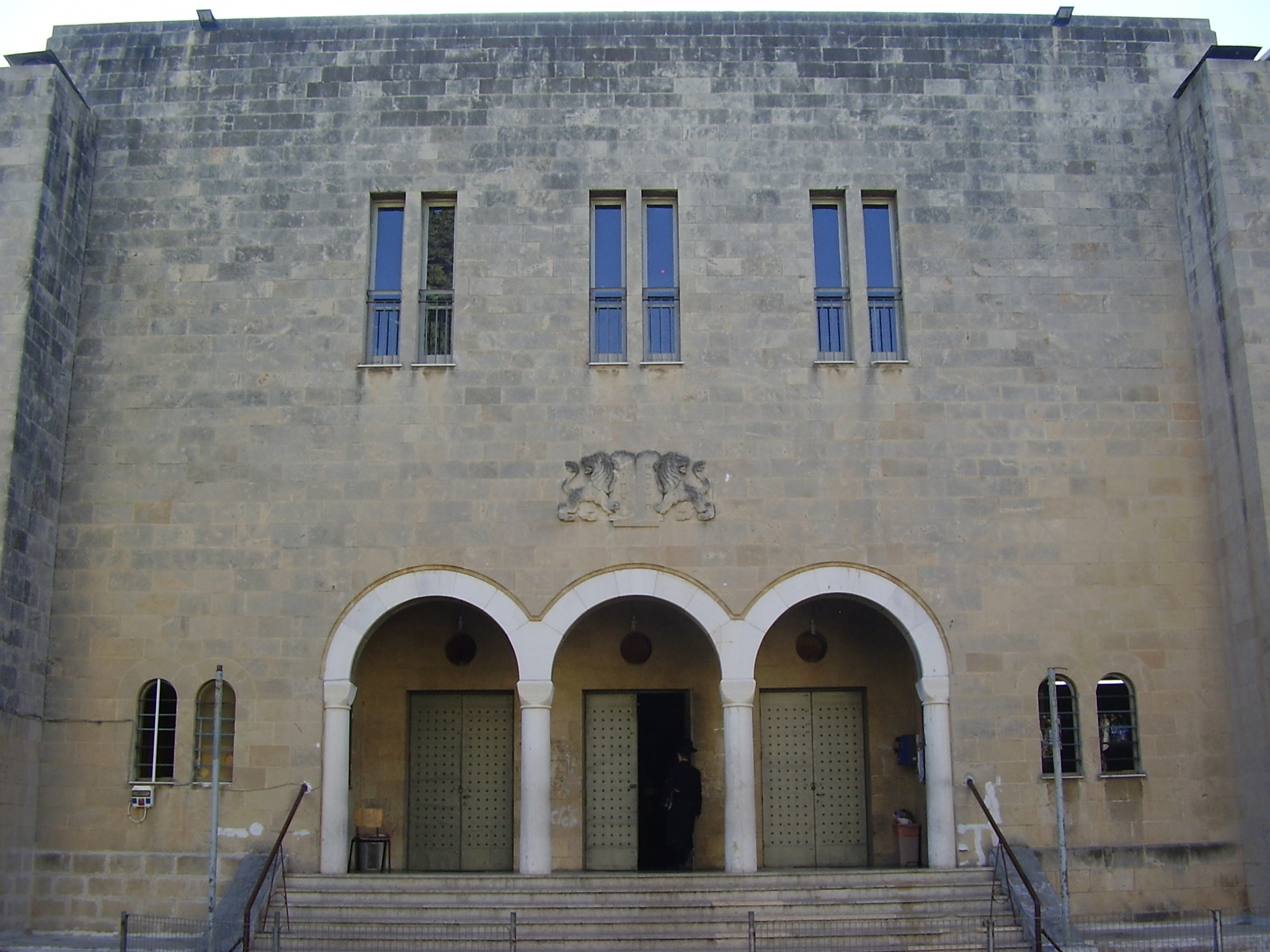
Great Synagogue of Haifa

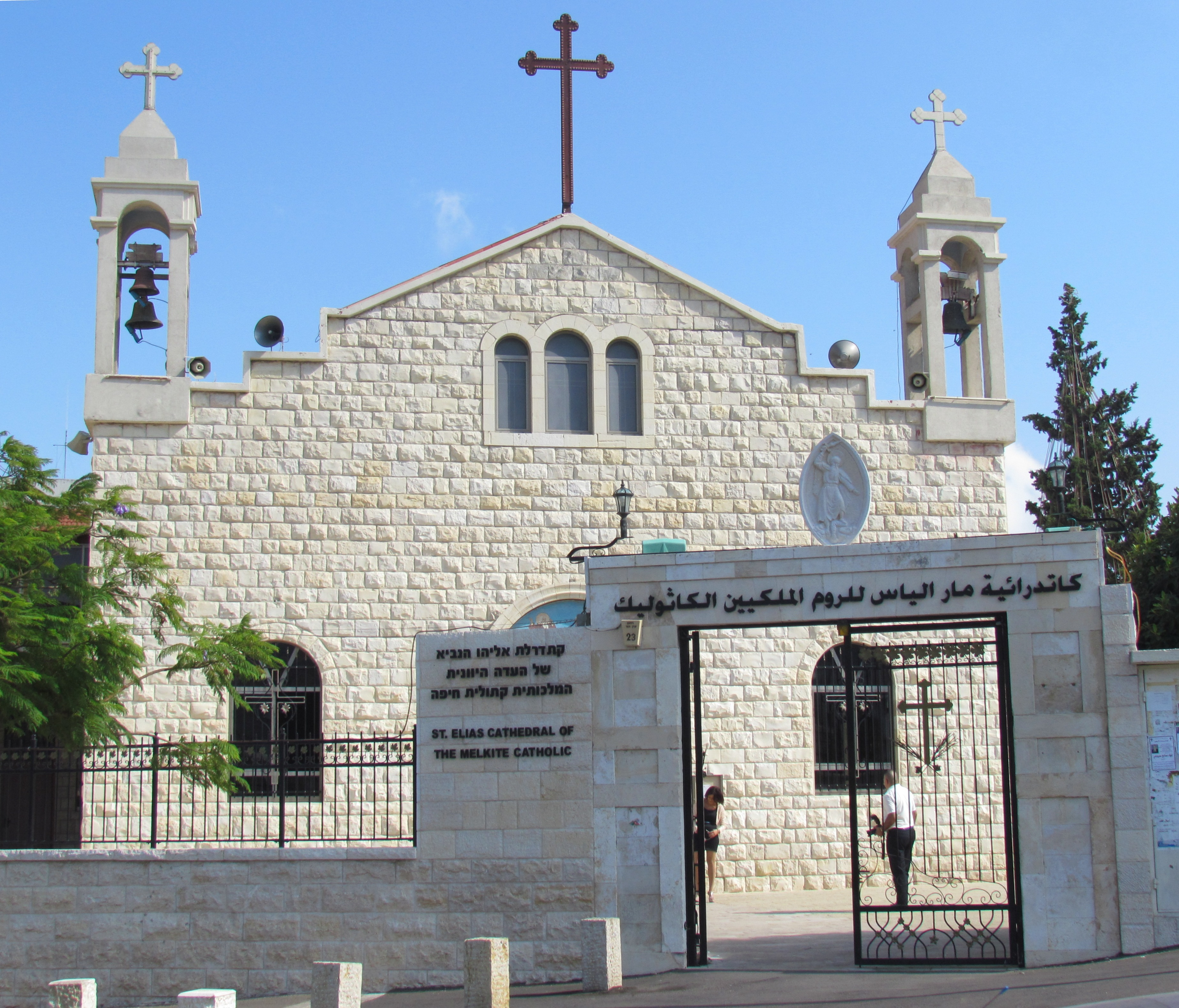
St. Elijah Cathedral, Haifa; episcopal see of the Archeparchy of Akka.

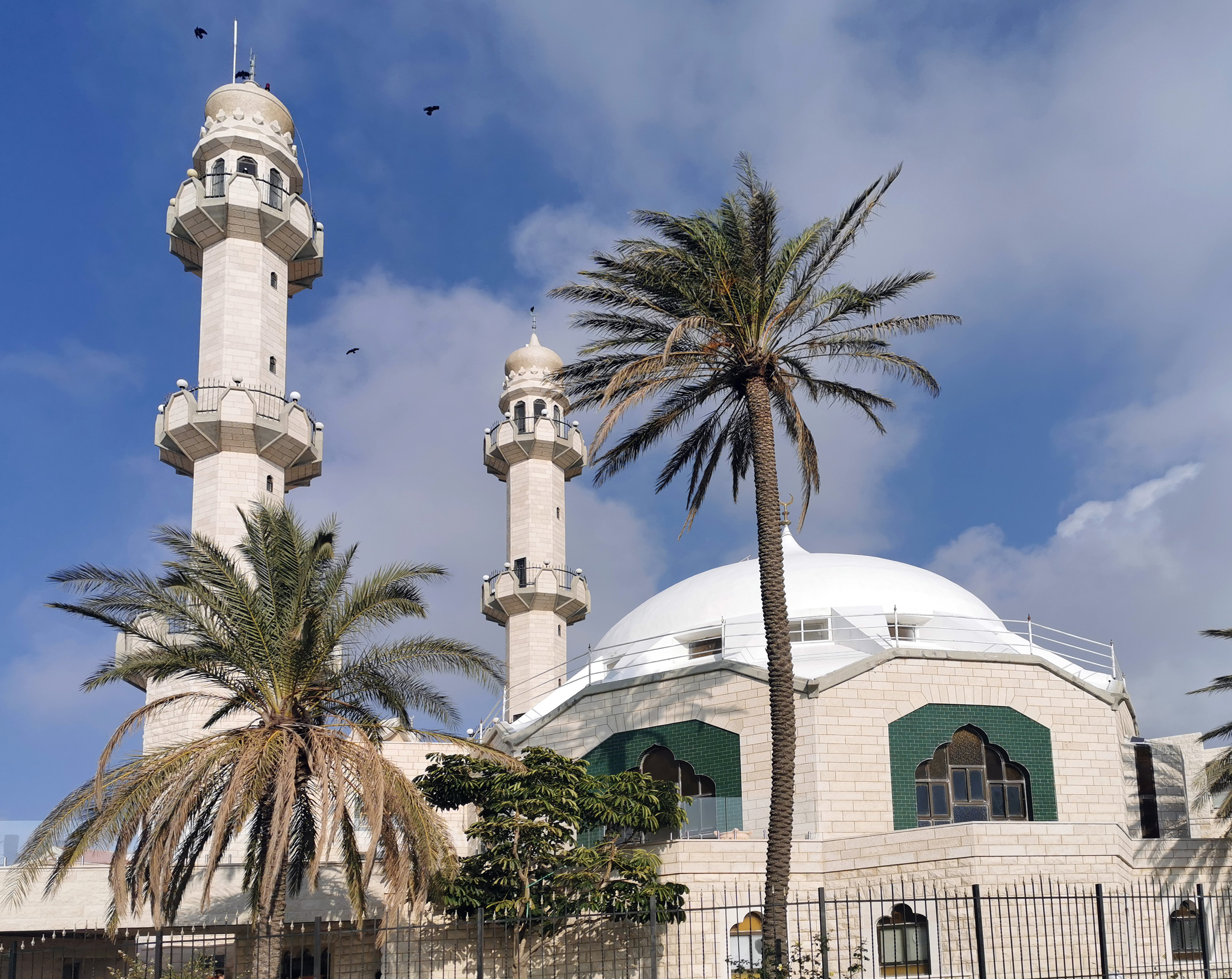
Mahmood Mosque built by the Ahmadiyya Muslim community in Haifa

In 1872 the population of Haifa was 98% Arabs and 2% Jews. These demographics began to change following beginning of modern Jewish Aliyah in 1881. By 1922 the popultion mix was 74% Arabs and 26% Jews and others, and by 1945 the majority had shifted, such that the popultion was 45% Arabs and 55% Jews. Just six years later, in 1951, two years after the Nakba, the population mix had changed substantially - Arabs and Jews made up 5% and 95% of the population respectively.

Today the population remains heterogeneous. Israeli Jews constitute some 82% of the population, almost 14% are Christians (the majority of whom are Arab Christians) and, some 4% are Muslims. Haifa also includes Druze and Baháʼí Faith communities. In 2006, 27% of the Arab population was aged 14 and under, compared to 17% of the Jewish and other population groups. The trend continues in the age 15–29 group, in which 27% of the Arab population is found, and the age 30–44 group (23%). The population of Jews and others in these age groups are 22% and 18% respectively. Nineteen percent of the city's Jewish and other population is between 45 and 59, compared to 14% of the Arab population. This continues with 14% of Jews and others aged 60–74 and 10% over age 75, in comparison to 7% and just 2% respectively in the Arab population. Arabs in Haifa tend to be wealthier and better educated compare to other Arabs elsewhere in Israel.

Haifa is home to the second-largest Arab Christian community in Israel, many of them lives in the Arabic-speaking neighborhoods in the lowlands near the sea; neighborhoods such as German Colony, Wadi Nisnas and Abbas, are largely Arab Christian. There are also a significant number of wealthy Christian Arabs in the Hadar West and Central. The Christian communities of Haifa are varied and included various denominations, the most prominent among them the Melkite Greek Catholic, followed by Greek Orthodox, Latin Catholics, Maronites, Armenian Orthodox, and Protestants. The Christian Arab communities in Haifa tend to be wealthier and better educated compare to other Arabs elsewhere in Israel. The Melkite Greek Catholic Archeparchy of Akka is based in Haifa, and its cathedral episcopal see is St. Elijah Greek-Melkite Cathedral.

Following Israel's withdrawal from Lebanon in 2000, some former South Lebanon Army soldiers and officers who fled from Lebanon settled in Haifa with their families.

In 2006, 2.9% of the Jews in the city were Haredi, compared to 7.5% on a national scale. However, the Haredi community in Haifa is growing fast due to a high fertility rate. 66.6% were secular, compared to a national average of 43.7%. There is also a Scandinavian Seamen Protestant church, established by Norwegian Righteous Among the Nations pastor Per Faye-Hansen.

Haifa is the center of liberal Arabic-speaking culture, as it was under British colonial rule. The Arabic-speaking neighborhoods, which are mixed Muslim and Christian, are in the lowlands near the sea, while Jewish neighborhoods are at a higher elevation. An active Arab cultural life has developed in the 21st century. The city is the center of many Arab-owned businesses such as theaters, bars, cafes, restaurants and nightclubs which also host different cultural discussions and art exhibitions.

== Geography ==
Haifa is situated on the Israeli Mediterranean Coastal Plain, the historic land bridge between Europe, Africa, and Asia, and the mouth of the Kishon River. Located on the northern slopes of Mount Carmel and around Haifa Bay, the city is split over three tiers. The lowest is the center of commerce and industry including the Port of Haifa. The middle level is on the slopes of Mount Carmel and consists of older residential neighborhoods, while the upper level consists of modern neighborhoods looking over the lower tiers. From here views can be had across the Western Galilee region of Israel towards Rosh HaNikra and the Lebanese border. Haifa is about 90 km (55.9 mi) north of the city of Tel Aviv, and has a large number of beaches on the Mediterranean.

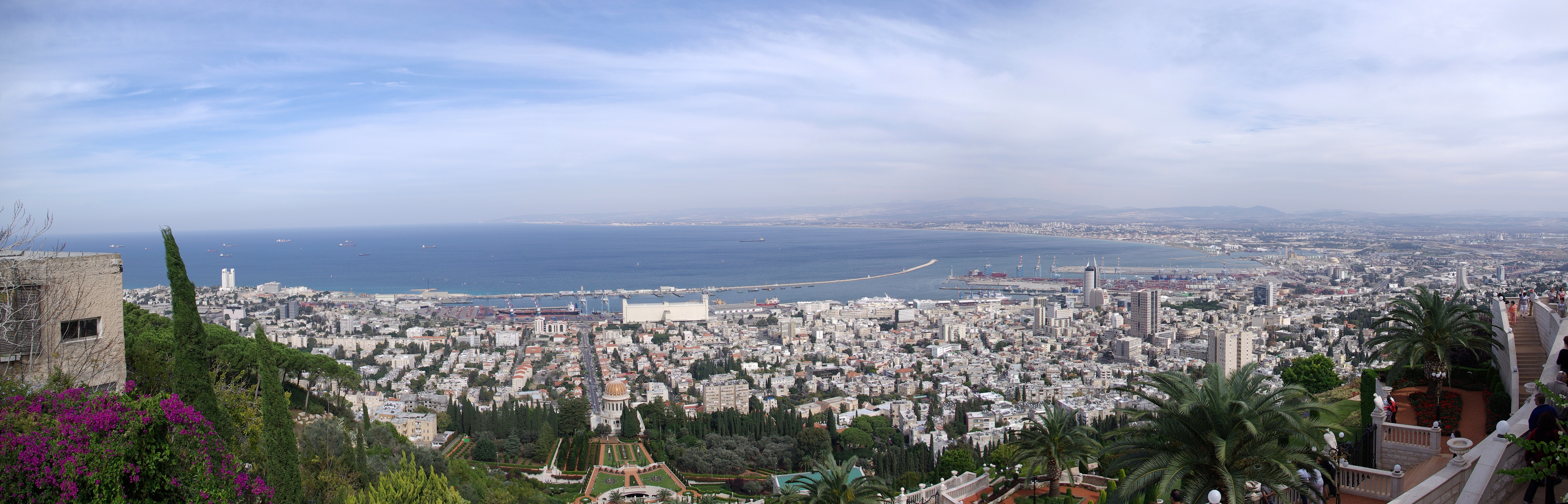
Panorama of Haifa from Mount Carmel

=== Flora and fauna ===
The Carmel Mountain has three main wadis: Lotem, Amik and Si'ach. For the most part these valleys are undeveloped natural corridors that run up through the city from the coast to the top of the mountain. Marked hiking paths traverse these areas and they provide habitat for wildlife such as wild boar, golden jackal, hyrax, Egyptian mongoose, owls and chameleons.

Haifa is inundated with boars. The boars began to descend from the valleys around the city from before 2019, and began to roam in the city's streets. In 2019, mayor Einat Kalisch-Rotem decided to stop shooting the boars. Boar sighting figures have struggled to go down since the Israel Nature and Parks Authority began fencing off forested areas, because residents often feed the boars.

=== Climate ===
Haifa has a hot-summer Mediterranean climate with hot, dry summers and mild, rainy winters (Köppen climate classification Csa). Spring arrives in March when temperatures begin to increase. By late May, the temperature has warmed up considerably to herald warm summer days. The average temperature in summer is 26 °C (79 °F) and in winter, 12 °C (54 °F). Frost is rare in Haifa, but temperatures around 3 °C (37 °F) can sometimes occur, usually in the early morning. Snow is very rare, which last fell in 1950. Humidity tends to be high all year round, and rain usually occurs between September and May. Annual precipitation is approximately 629 mm (25 in).

Climate data for Haifa Airport (5 m / 16 ft) (Temperature: 1995–2010, Extremes 1898–2011, Precipitation: 1980–2010)
Month	Jan	Feb	Mar	Apr	May	Jun	Jul	Aug	Sep	Oct	Nov	Dec	Year
Record high °C (°F)	27.0 (80.6)	30.4 (86.7)	38.0 (100.4)	42.5 (108.5)	44.6 (112.3)	43.5 (110.3)	37.8 (100.0)	37.8 (100.0)	41.8 (107.2)	41.4 (106.5)	36.0 (96.8)	31.5 (88.7)	44.6 (112.3)
Mean maximum °C (°F)	22.6 (72.7)	25.0 (77.0)	29.9 (85.8)	35.5 (95.9)	36.2 (97.2)	34.6 (94.3)	35.2 (95.4)	34.1 (93.4)	34.7 (94.5)	35.4 (95.7)	30.3 (86.5)	24.7 (76.5)	36.2 (97.2)
Mean daily maximum °C (°F)	17.8 (64.0)	18.6 (65.5)	20.9 (69.6)	23.8 (74.8)	26.5 (79.7)	29.5 (85.1)	31.6 (88.9)	31.6 (88.9)	30.2 (86.4)	27.9 (82.2)	24.4 (75.9)	19.8 (67.6)	25.2 (77.4)
Daily mean °C (°F)	13.9 (57.0)	14.4 (57.9)	16.5 (61.7)	19.4 (66.9)	22.4 (72.3)	25.7 (78.3)	28.0 (82.4)	28.4 (83.1)	26.7 (80.1)	23.7 (74.7)	19.8 (67.6)	15.8 (60.4)	21.2 (70.2)
Mean daily minimum °C (°F)	10.0 (50.0)	10.2 (50.4)	12.1 (53.8)	14.8 (58.6)	18.2 (64.8)	21.9 (71.4)	24.4 (75.9)	25.1 (77.2)	23.2 (73.8)	19.5 (67.1)	15.1 (59.2)	11.8 (53.2)	15.9 (60.6)
Mean minimum °C (°F)	5.4 (41.7)	6.1 (43.0)	7.6 (45.7)	9.5 (49.1)	13.7 (56.7)	18.4 (65.1)	21.7 (71.1)	22.7 (72.9)	19.5 (67.1)	14.8 (58.6)	9.9 (49.8)	7.3 (45.1)	5.4 (41.7)
Record low °C (°F)	−1.6 (29.1)	−3.5 (25.7)	2.0 (35.6)	4.3 (39.7)	9.6 (49.3)	13.0 (55.4)	17.0 (62.6)	17.9 (64.2)	14.2 (57.6)	8.5 (47.3)	5.0 (41.0)	0.2 (32.4)	−3.5 (25.7)
Average rainfall mm (inches)	124.9 (4.92)	95.2 (3.75)	52.8 (2.08)	23.6 (0.93)	2.7 (0.11)	0.1 (0.00)	0.0 (0.0)	0.0 (0.0)	1.2 (0.05)	28.0 (1.10)	77.8 (3.06)	135.5 (5.33)	541.8 (21.33)
Average rainy days (≥ 0.1 mm)	13.9	11.7	8.6	3.6	1.4	0.1	0.1	0	0.8	3.9	8.0	11.8	63.9
Source: Israel Meteorological Service

Climate data for University of Haifa (475 m / 1558 ft) (Temperature: 1995–2010, Precipitation: 1980–2010)
Month	Jan	Feb	Mar	Apr	May	Jun	Jul	Aug	Sep	Oct	Nov	Dec	Year
Record high °C (°F)	23.6 (74.5)	26.2 (79.2)	32.9 (91.2)	36.6 (97.9)	39.0 (102.2)	38.9 (102.0)	36.6 (97.9)	34.9 (94.8)	38.9 (102.0)	36.3 (97.3)	30.0 (86.0)	28.3 (82.9)	39.0 (102.2)
Mean daily maximum °C (°F)	13.3 (55.9)	14.2 (57.6)	16.8 (62.2)	20.2 (68.4)	23.3 (73.9)	25.1 (77.2)	26.5 (79.7)	26.9 (80.4)	26.2 (79.2)	24.2 (75.6)	19.9 (67.8)	15.5 (59.9)	21.0 (69.8)
Daily mean °C (°F)	11.0 (51.8)	11.5 (52.7)	13.8 (56.8)	16.5 (61.7)	19.7 (67.5)	22.0 (71.6)	23.7 (74.7)	24.2 (75.6)	23.4 (74.1)	21.3 (70.3)	17.2 (63.0)	13.1 (55.6)	18.1 (64.6)
Mean daily minimum °C (°F)	8.6 (47.5)	8.9 (48.0)	10.7 (51.3)	12.9 (55.2)	16.1 (61.0)	18.8 (65.8)	20.8 (69.4)	21.5 (70.7)	20.6 (69.1)	18.4 (65.1)	14.6 (58.3)	10.7 (51.3)	15.2 (59.4)
Record low °C (°F)	−0.3 (31.5)	1.3 (34.3)	1.0 (33.8)	4.2 (39.6)	10.1 (50.2)	11.5 (52.7)	16.7 (62.1)	18.1 (64.6)	15.9 (60.6)	8.8 (47.8)	5.1 (41.2)	2.5 (36.5)	−0.3 (31.5)
Average rainfall mm (inches)	166 (6.5)	128 (5.0)	71 (2.8)	21 (0.8)	5 (0.2)	0 (0)	0 (0)	0 (0)	2 (0.1)	36 (1.4)	93 (3.7)	161 (6.3)	683 (26.8)
Average rainy days (≥ 0.1 mm)	14	12	9	4	1	0	0	0	1	4	8	12	65
Average relative humidity (%)	68	67	63	61	63	74	80	82	74	67	59	65	69
Source: Israel Meteorological Service

== Neighborhoods ==
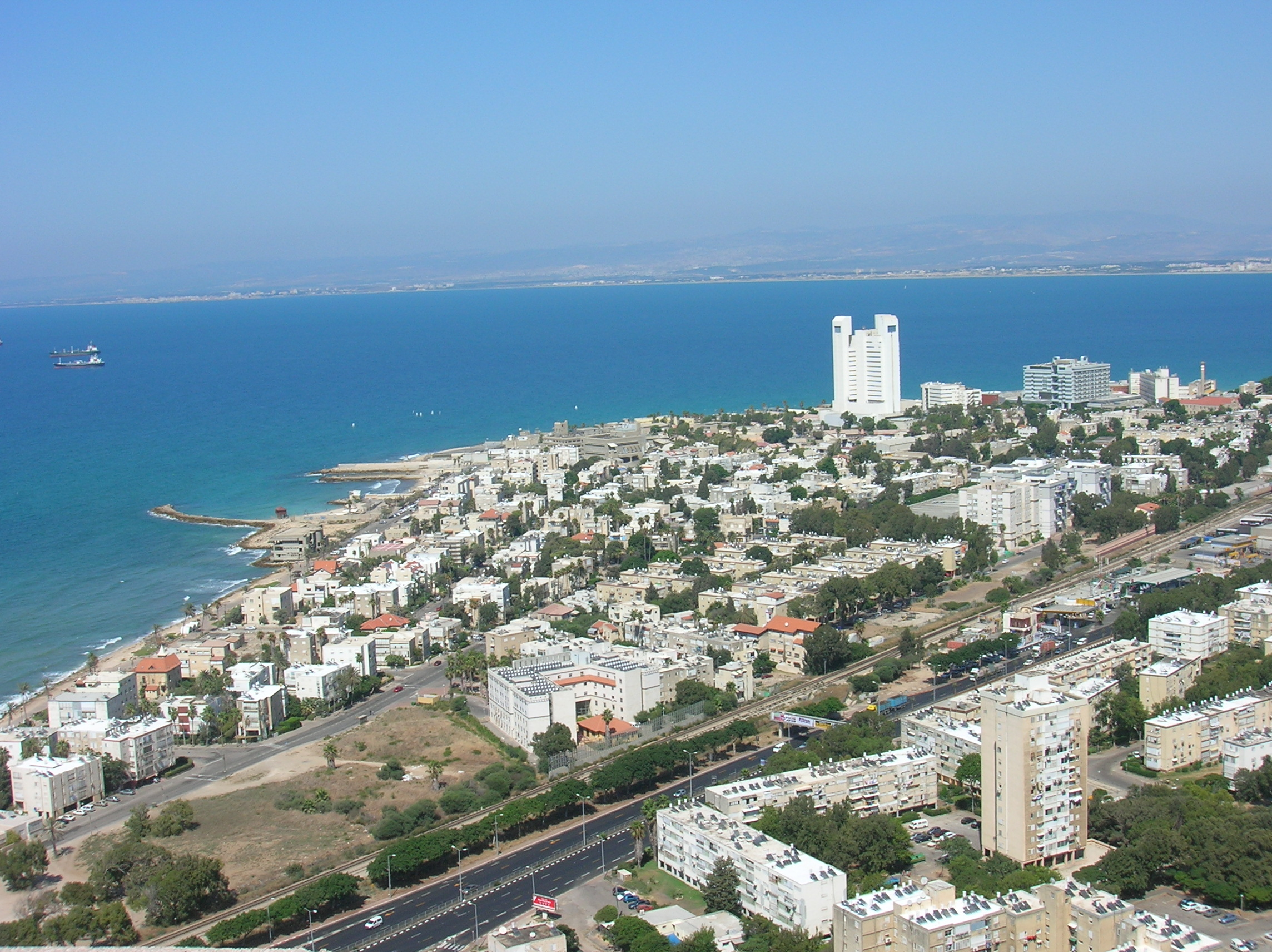
Bat Galim neighborhood and Haifa Bay

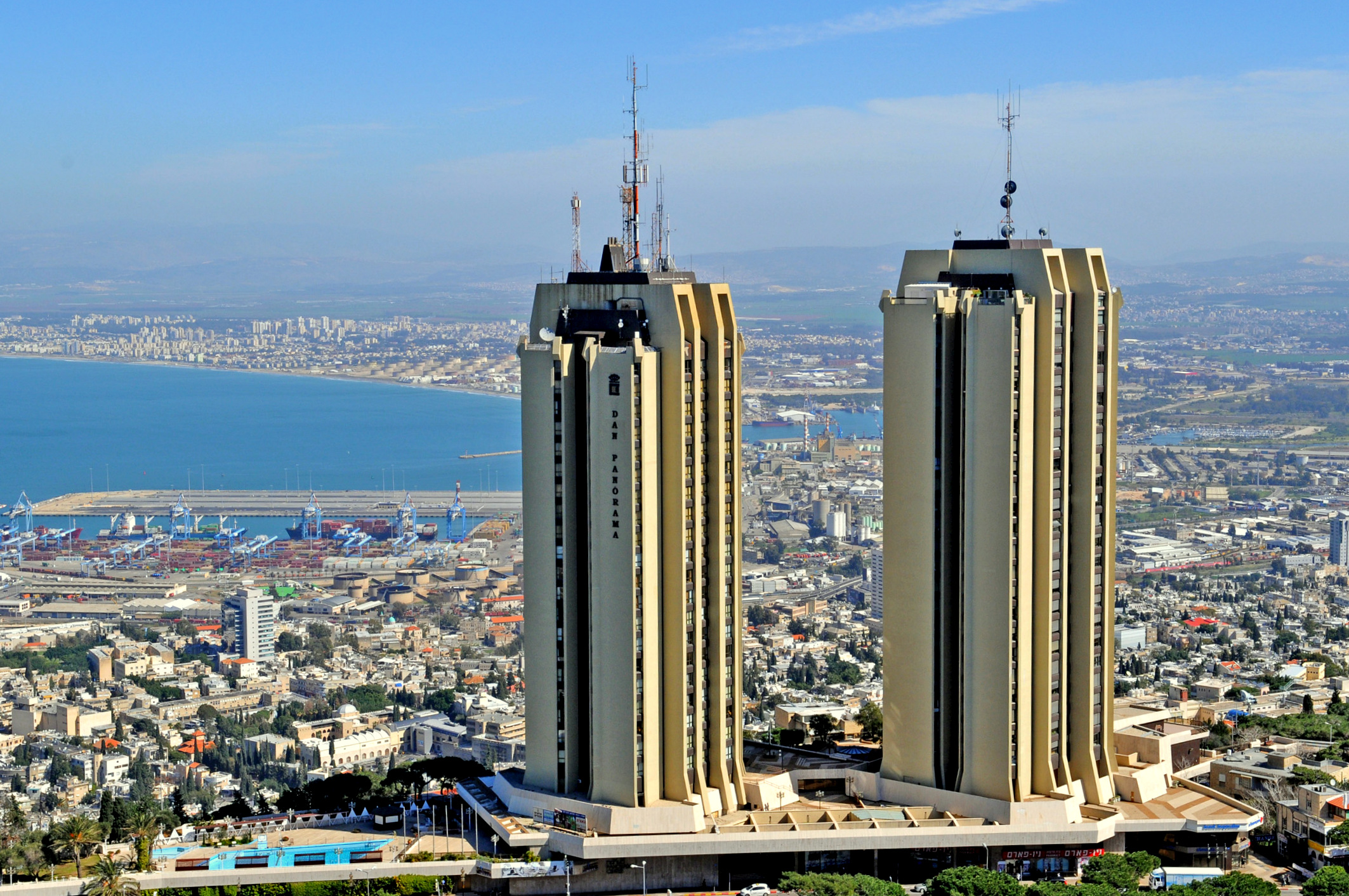
Panorama Towers

Haifa has developed in tiers, from the lower to the upper city on the Carmel. The oldest neighborhood in modern Haifa is Wadi Salib, the Old City center near the port, which has been bisected by a major road and razed in part to make way for Government Buildings. Wadi Salib stretches across to Wadi Nisnas, the center of Arab life in Haifa today. In the 19th century, under Ottoman rule, the German Colony was built, providing the first model of urban planning in Haifa. Some of the buildings have been restored and the colony has turned into a center of Haifa nightlife.

The first buildings in Hadar were constructed at the start of the 20th century. Hadar was Haifa's cultural center and marketplace throughout the 1920s and into the 1980s, nestled above and around Haifa's Arab neighborhoods. Today Hadar stretches from the port area near the bay, approximately halfway up Mount Carmel, around the German Colony, Wadi Nisnas and Wadi Salib. Hadar houses two commercial centers (one in the port area, and one midway up the mountain) surrounded by some of the city's older neighborhoods.

Neve Sha'anan, a neighborhood located on the second tier of Mount Carmel, was founded in the 1920s. West of the port are the neighborhoods of Bat Galim, Shikmona Beach, and Kiryat Eliezer. To the west and east of Hadar are the Arab neighborhoods of Abbas and Khalisa, built in the 1960s and 70s. To the south of Mount Carmel's headland, along the road to Tel Aviv, are the neighborhoods of Ein HaYam, Shaar HaAliya, Kiryat Sprinzak and Neve David.

Above Hadar are affluent neighborhoods such as the Carmel Tzarfati (French Carmel), Merkaz HaCarmel (Carmel Center), Romema (Ramot Ben Gurion), Ahuzat HaCarmel (Ahuza), Carmeliya, Vardiya, Ramat Golda, Ramat Alon and Hod Ha'Carmel (Denya). While there are general divisions between Arab and Jewish neighborhoods, there is an increasing trend for wealthy Arabs to move into affluent Jewish neighborhoods. Another Carmel neighborhood is Kababir, home to the National Headquarters of Israel's Ahmadiyya Community; located near Merkaz HaCarmel and overlooking the coast.

== Economy ==
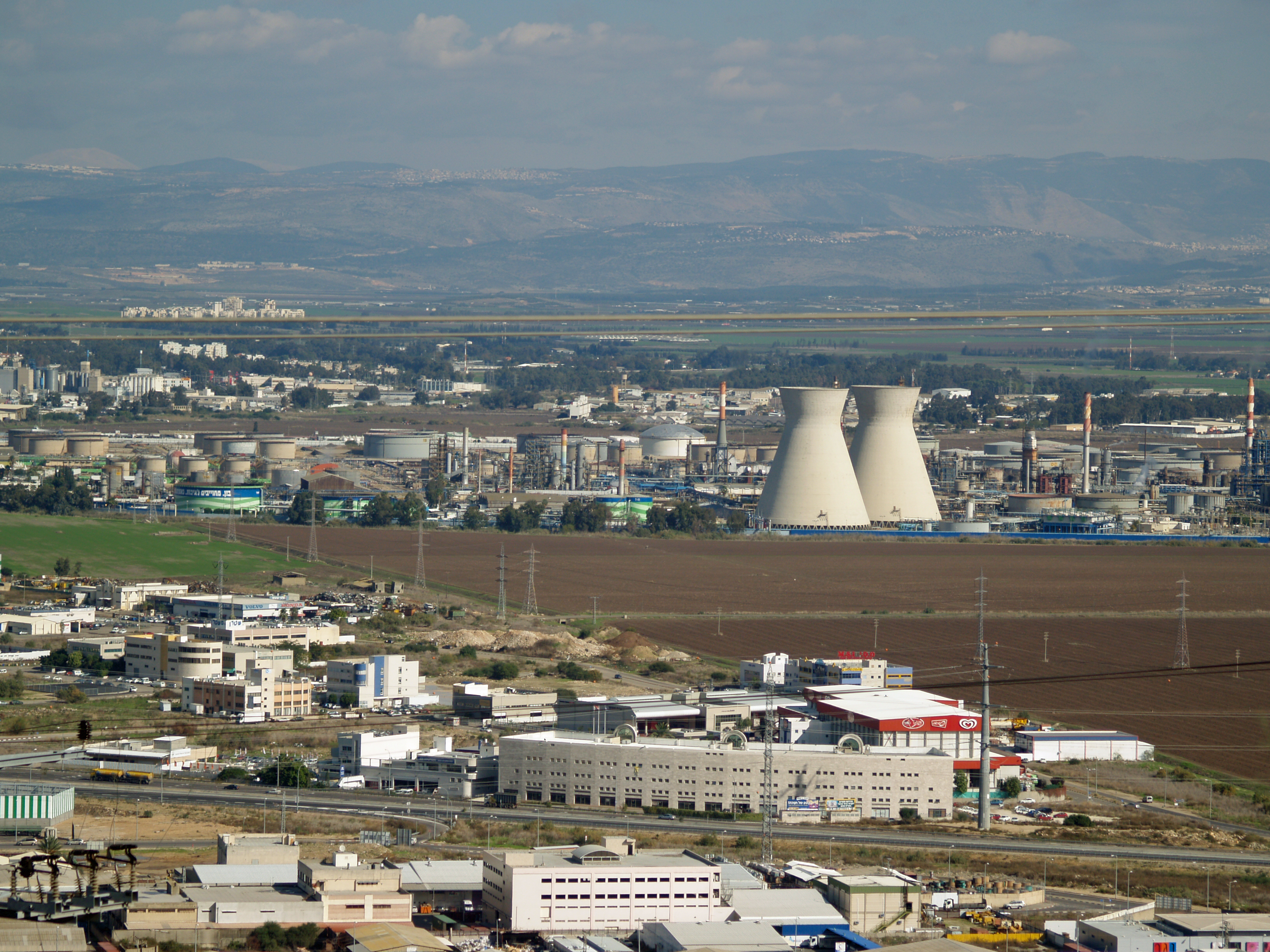
Haifa Oil Refinery

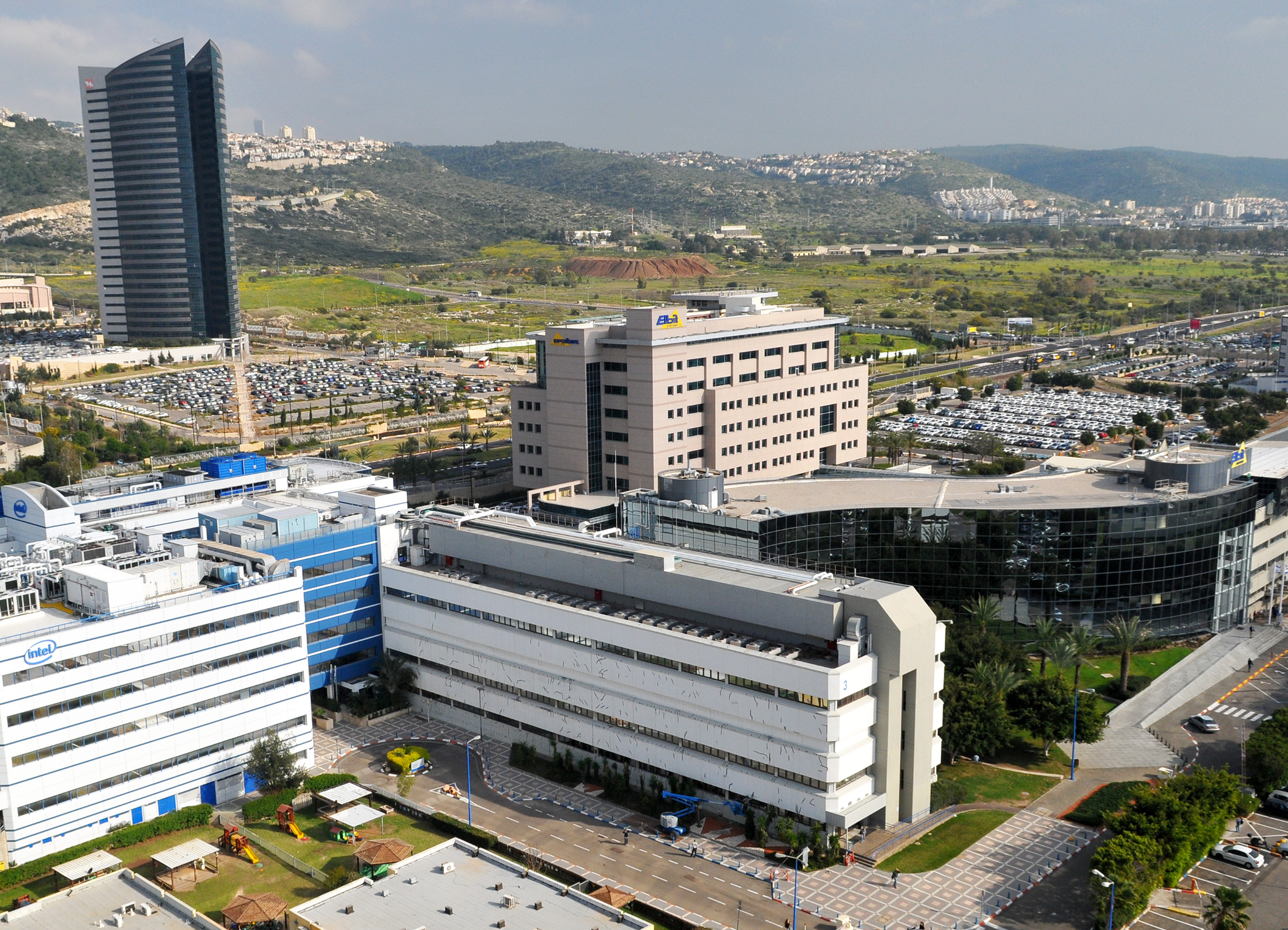
Matam hi-tech park

The common Israeli saying, "Haifa works, Jerusalem prays, and Tel Aviv plays" attests to Haifa's reputation as a city of workers and industry. The industrial region of Haifa is in the eastern part of the city, around the Kishon River. It is home to the Haifa oil refinery, one of the two oil refineries in Israel (the other refinery being located in Ashdod). The Haifa refinery processes 9 million tons (66 million barrels) of crude oil a year. Its nowadays unused twin 80-meter high cooling towers, built in the 1930s, were the tallest buildings built in the British Mandate period. Matam (short for Merkaz Ta'asiyot Mada – Scientific Industries Center), the largest and oldest business park in Israel, is at the southern entrance to the city, hosting manufacturing and R&D facilities for a large number of Israeli and international hi-tech companies, such as Apple, Amazon, Abbot, Cadence, Intel, IBM, Magic Leap, Microsoft, Motorola, Google, Yahoo!, Elbit, CSR, Philips, PwC and Amdocs. The campus of the University of Haifa is also home to IBM Haifa Labs.

The Port of Haifa is the leader in passenger traffic among Israeli ports, and is also a major cargo harbor, although deregulation has seen its dominance challenged by the Port of Ashdod. Haifa malls and shopping centers include Hutsot Hamifratz, Horev Center Mall, Panorama Center, Castra Center, Colony Center (Lev HaMoshava), Hanevi'im Tower Mall, Kanyon Haifa, Lev Hamifratz Mall and Grand Kanyon. In 2010, Monocle magazine identified Haifa as the city with the most promising business potential, with the greatest investment opportunities in the world. The magazine noted that "a massive head-to-toe regeneration is starting to have an impact; from scaffolding and cranes around town, to renovated façades and new smart places to eat". The Haifa municipality had spent more than $350 million on roads and infrastructure, and the number of building permits had risen 83% in the previous two years.

In 2014, it was announced that a technology-focused stock exchange would be established to compete with the Tel Aviv Stock Exchange. Currently, some 40 hotels, mostly boutique hotels, are planned, have been approved, or are under construction. The Haifa Municipality is seeking to turn the city into Northern Israel's tourist center, from where travelers can embark on day trips into Acre, Nazareth, Tiberias, and the Galilee. A new life sciences industrial park containing five buildings with 85,000 square meters of space on a 31-duman (7.75 acre) site is being built adjacent to the Matam industrial park.

=== Tourism and religious sites ===
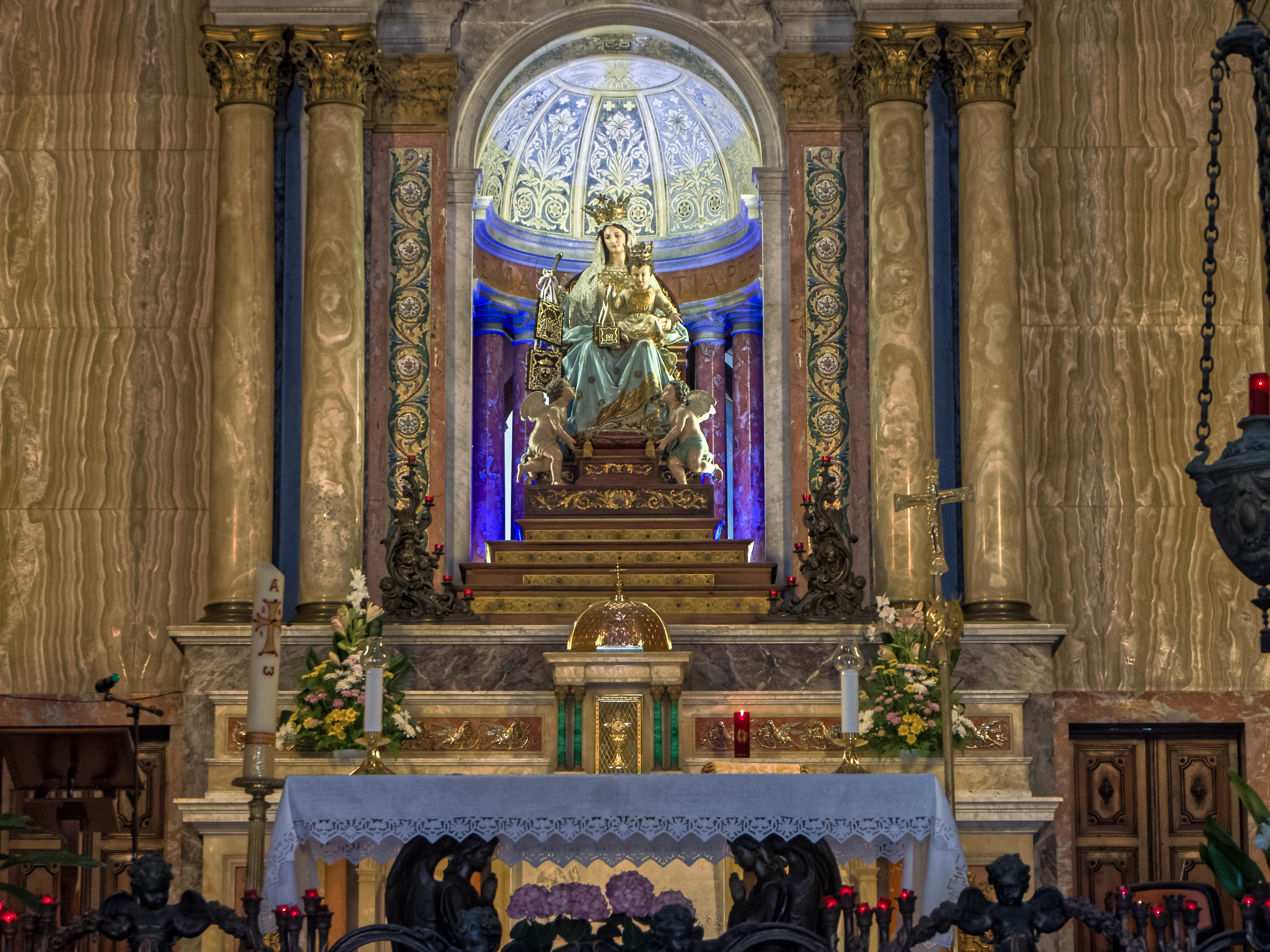
Interior of Stella Maris Monastery

Mount Carmel and the Kishon River are mentioned in the Hebrew Bible. A grotto on the top of Mount Carmel is known as the "Cave of Elijah", traditionally linked to the Prophet Elijah and his apprentice, Elisha. In Arabic, the highest peak of the Carmel range is called the Muhraka, or "place of burning", harking back to the burnt offerings and sacrifices there in Canaanite and early Israelite times.

In 2005, Haifa had 13 hotels with a total of 1,462 rooms. The city has a 17 km (11 mi) shoreline, of which 5 km (3 mi) are beaches. Haifa's main tourist attraction is the Baháʼí World Centre, with the golden-domed Shrine of the Báb and the surrounding gardens. Between 2005 and 2006, 86,037 visited the shrine. In 2008, the Baháʼí gardens were designated a UNESCO World Heritage Site. The restored German Colony, founded by the Templers, Stella Maris and Elijah's Cave also draw many tourists. Located in the Haifa district are the Ein Hod artists' colony, where over 90 artists and craftsmen have studios and exhibitions, and the Mount Carmel national park, with caves where Neanderthal and early Homo Sapiens remains were found.

A 2007 report commissioned by the Haifa Municipality calls for the construction of more hotels, a ferry line between Haifa, Acre and Caesarea, development of the western anchorage of the port as a recreation and entertainment area, and an expansion of the local airport and port to accommodate international travel and cruise ships.

== Arts and culture ==
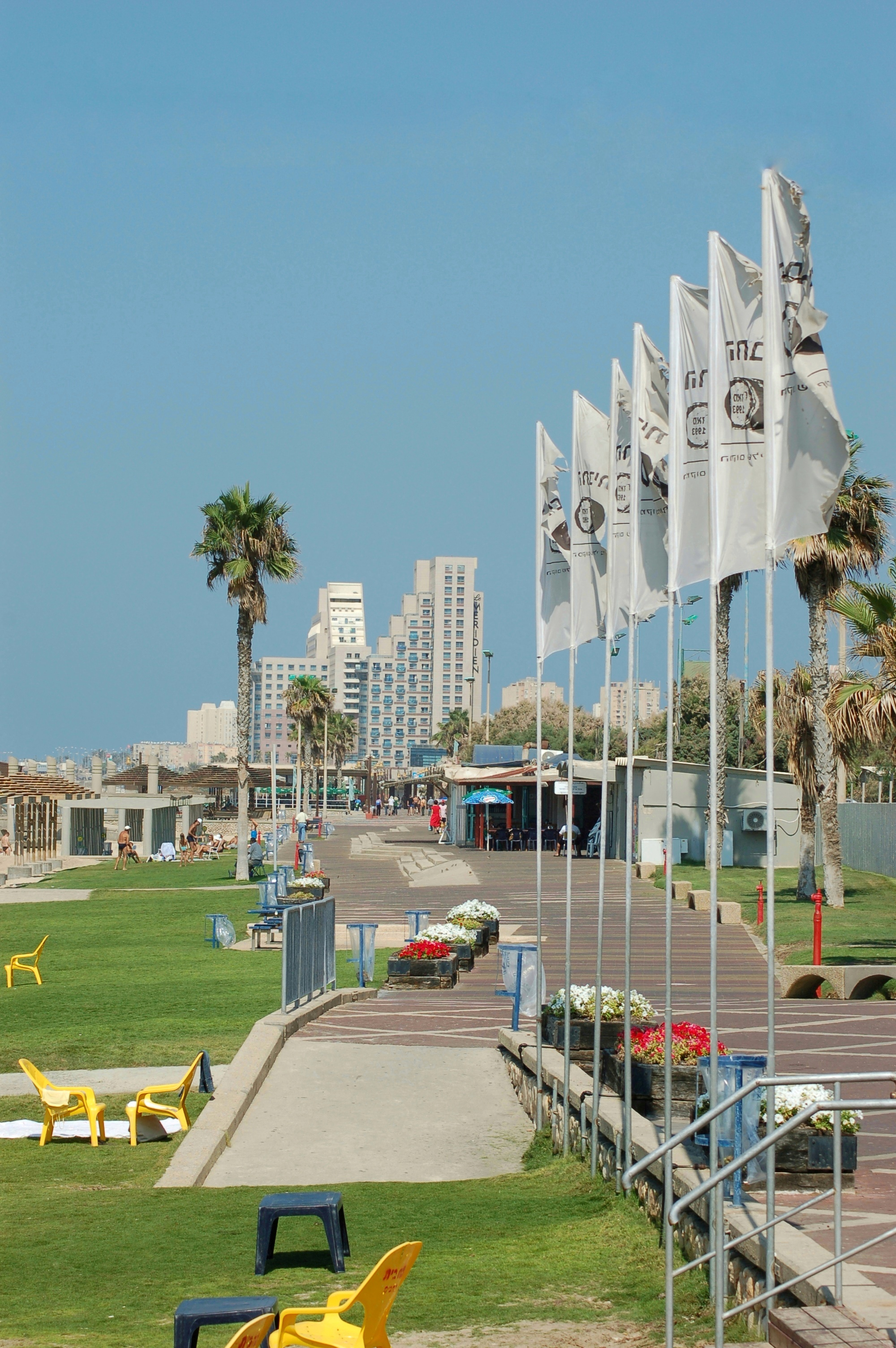
Promenade along Dado Beach

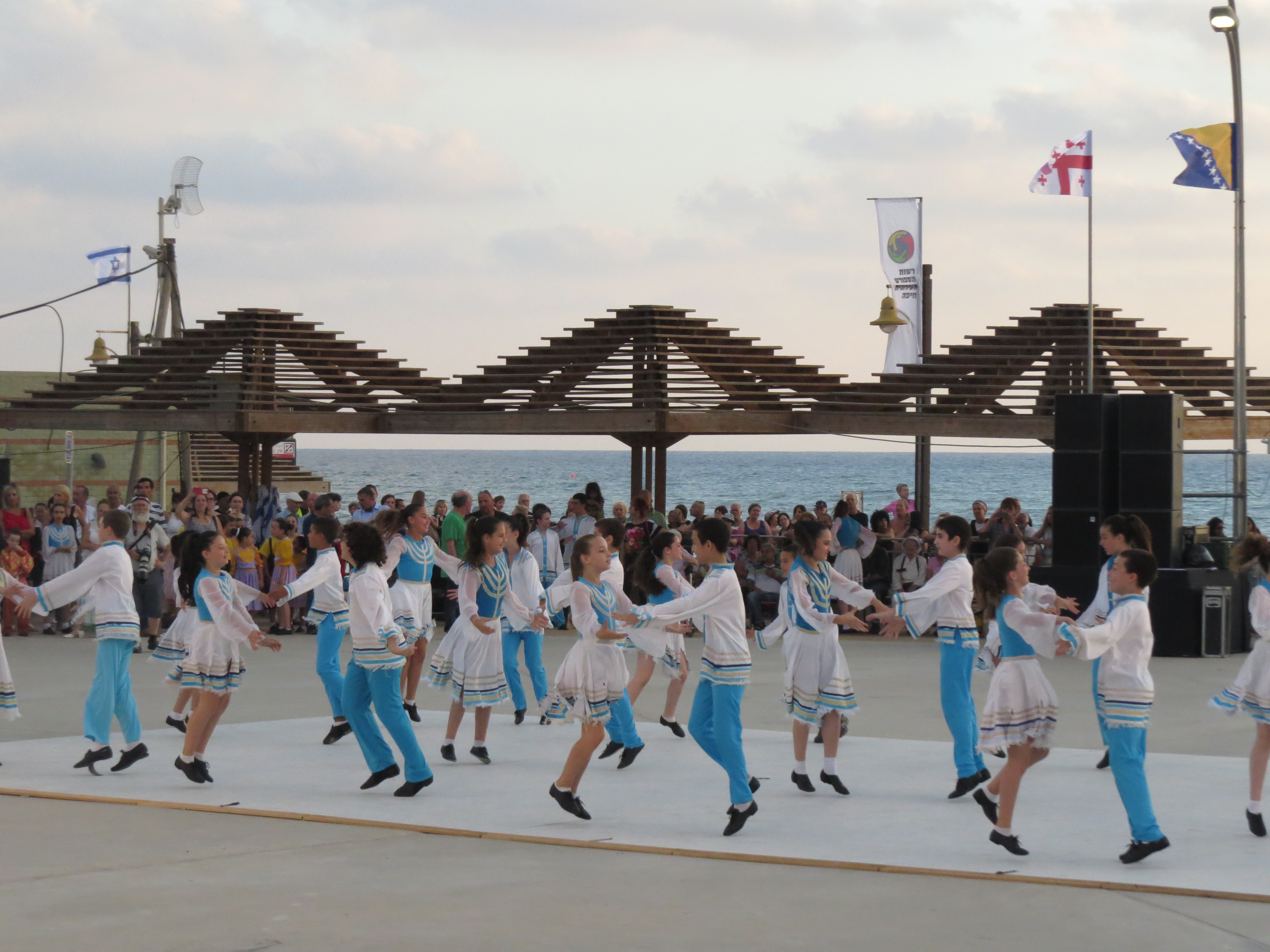
Folk dancing on Dado Beach

Despite its image as a port and industrial city, Haifa is the cultural hub of northern Israel. During the 1950s, mayor Abba Hushi made a special effort to encourage authors and poets to move to the city, and founded the Haifa Theatre, a repertory theater, the first municipal theater founded in the country. The principal Arabic theater servicing the northern Arab population is the al-Midan Theater. Other theaters in the city include the Krieger Centre for the Performing Arts and the Rappaport Art and Culture Center. The Congress Center hosts exhibitions, concerts and special events.

The New Haifa Symphony Orchestra, established in 1950, has more than 5,000 subscribers. In 2004, 49,000 people attended its concerts. The Haifa Cinematheque, founded in 1975, hosts the annual Haifa International Film Festival during the intermediate days of the Sukkot holiday. Haifa has 29 movie theaters. The city publishes a local newspaper, Yediot Haifa, and has its own radio station, Radio Haifa.רדיו חיפה – 107.5FM The Israeli Arabic-language newspapers Al-Ittihad and Al-Madina are also based in Haifa. During the 1990s, Haifa hosted the Haifa Rock & Blues Festival featuring Bob Dylan, Nick Cave, Blur and PJ Harvey. The last festival was held in 1995 with Sheryl Crow, Suede and Faith No More as headliners.

=== Museums ===
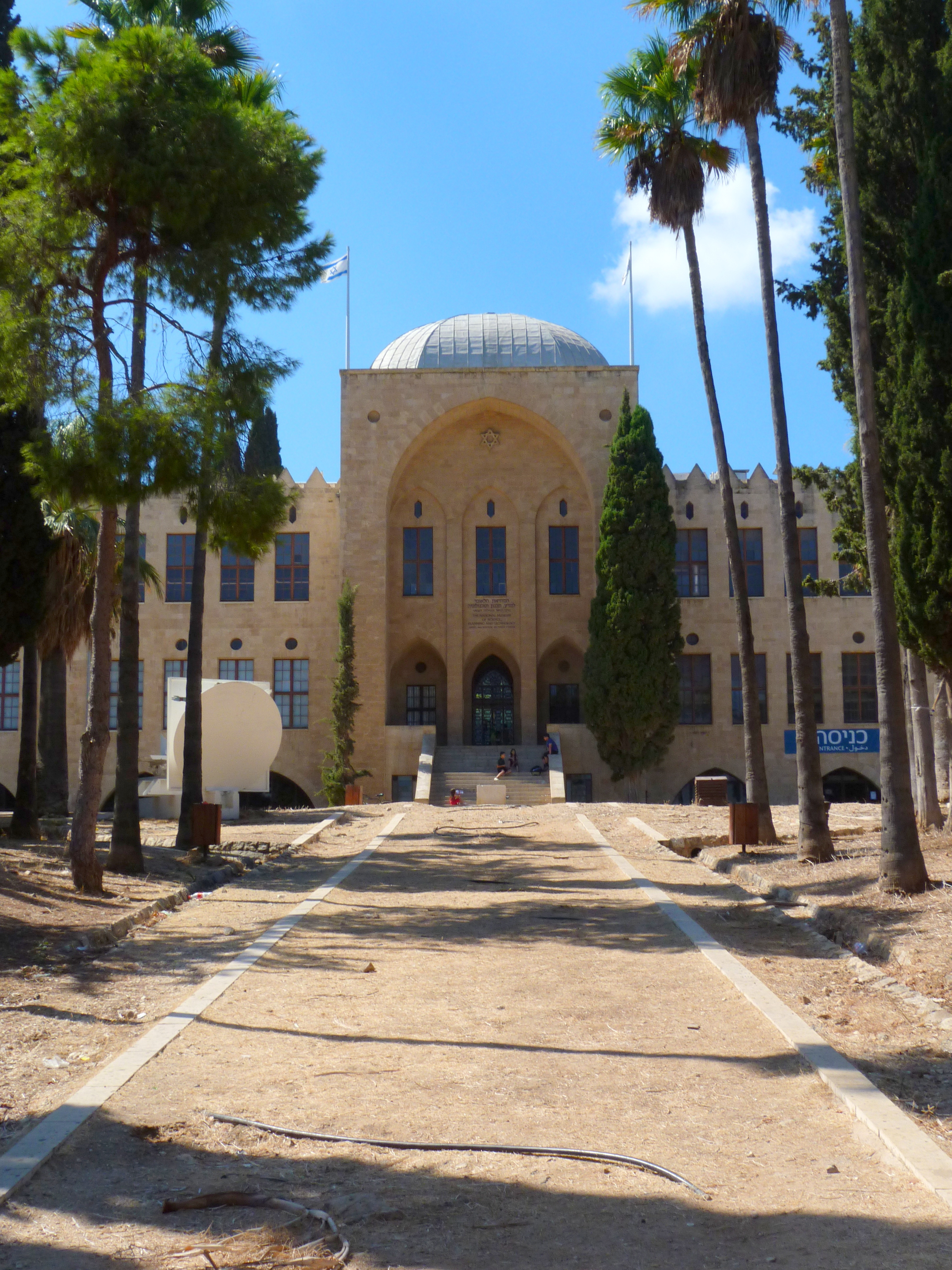
National Museum of Science, Haifa

Haifa has over a dozen museums. The most popular museum is the Israel National Museum of Science, Technology, and Space, which recorded almost 150,000 visitors in 2004. The museum is located in the historic Technion building in the Hadar neighborhood. The Haifa Museum of Art houses a collection of modern and classical art, as well as displays on the history of Haifa. The Tikotin Museum of Japanese Art is the only museum in the Middle East dedicated solely to Japanese art. Other museums in Haifa include the Museum of Prehistory, the National Maritime Museum and Haifa City Museum, the Hecht Museum, the Dagon Archaeological Museum of Grain Handling, the Railway Museum, the Clandestine Immigration and Naval Museum, the Israeli Oil Industry Museum, and Chagall Artists' House. As part of his campaign to bring culture to Haifa, Mayor Abba Hushi provided the artist Mane-Katz with a building on Mount Carmel to house his collection of Judaica, which is now a museum. The former home and studio of artist Hermann Struck is now the Hermann Struck Museum. The Haifa Educational Zoo at Gan HaEm park houses a small animal collection including Syrian brown bears, now extinct from Israel. Wןthin the zoo is the Pinhas House biology institute. In the close vicinity of Haifa, on the Carmel, the Northern "Hai-Bar" ("wild life") operated by Israel's Parks and Reserves Authority for the purpose of breeding and reintroduction of species now extinct from Israel, such as Persian Fallow Deer.

== Government ==
As an industrial port city, Haifa has traditionally been a Labor party stronghold. The strong presence of dock workers and trade unions earned it the nickname 'Red Haifa.' In addition, many prominent Arabs in the Israeli Communist Party, among them Tawfik Toubi, Emile Habibi, Zahi Karkabi, Bulus Farah and Emile Toma, were from Haifa.

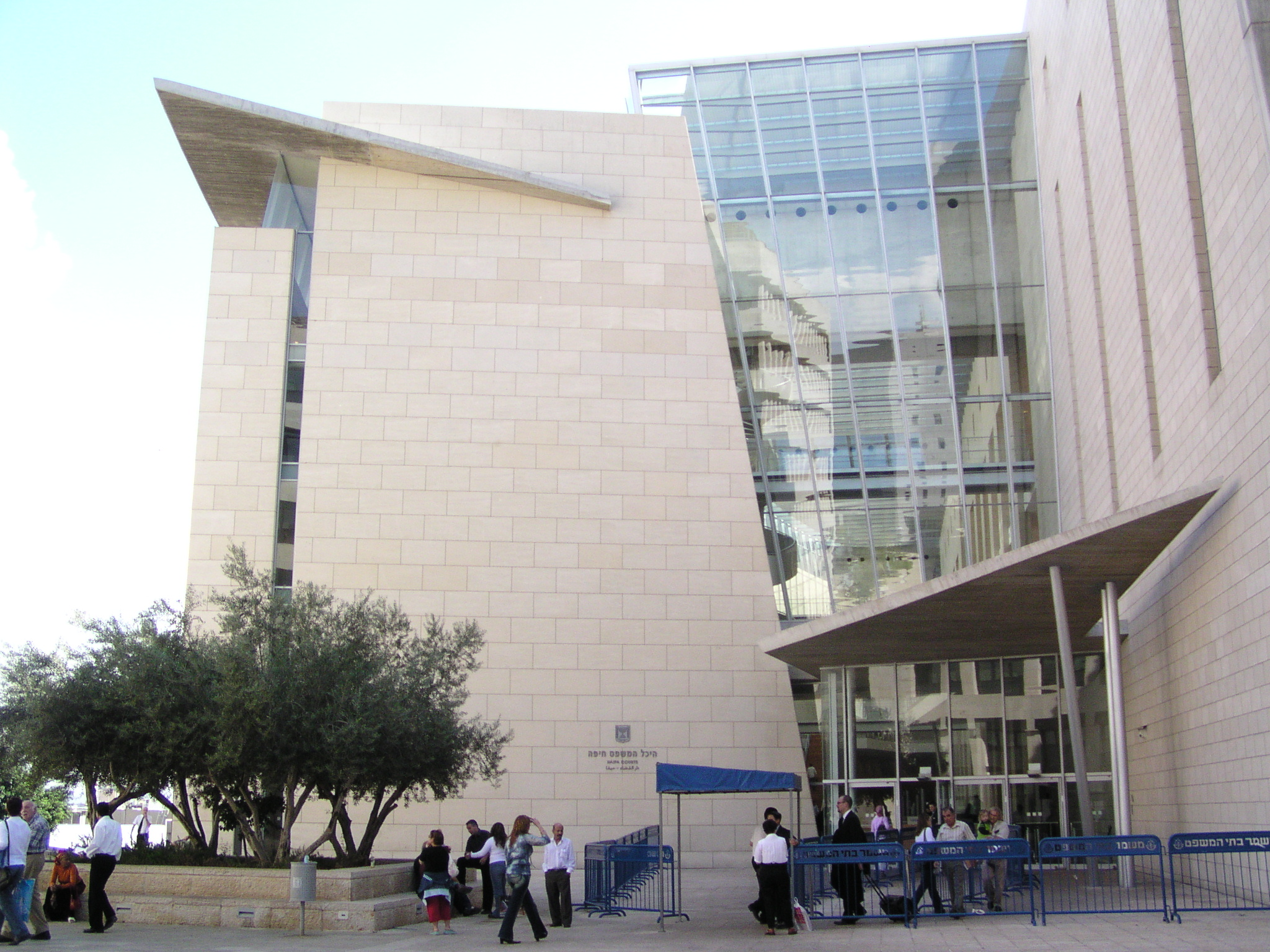
Haifa court building

There has been a drift toward the center. This was best signified by, in the 2006 legislative elections, the Kadima party receiving about 28.9% of the votes in Haifa, and Labor lagging behind with 16.9%. Before 1948, Haifa's Municipality was fairly unusual as it developed cooperation between the mixed Arab and Jewish community in the city, with representatives of both groups involved in the city's management. Under mayor al-Haj, between 1920 and 1927, the city council had six Arab and two Jewish representatives, with the city run as a mixed municipality with overall Arab control. Greater cooperation was introduced under Hasan Bey Shukri, who adopted a positive and conciliatory attitude toward the city's Jews and gave them senior posts in the municipality. In 1940, the first Jewish mayor, Shabtai Levy, was elected. Levy's two deputies were Arab (one Muslim, the other Christian), with the remainder of the council made up of four Jews and six Arabs.

Today, Haifa is governed by its 12th city council, headed by the mayor Einat Kalisch-Rotem. The results of municipal elections decide on the makeup of the council, similarly to the Knesset elections. The city council is the legislative council in the city, and has the authority to pass auxiliary laws. The 12th council, which was elected in 2003, has 31 members, with the liberal Shinui-Greens ticket holding the most seats (6), and Likud coming second with 5. Many of the decisions passed by the city council are results of recommendation made by the various municipal committees, which are committees where non-municipal organs meet with representatives from the city council. Some committees are spontaneous, but some are mandatory, such as the security committee, tender committee and financial committee.

=== Mayors ===
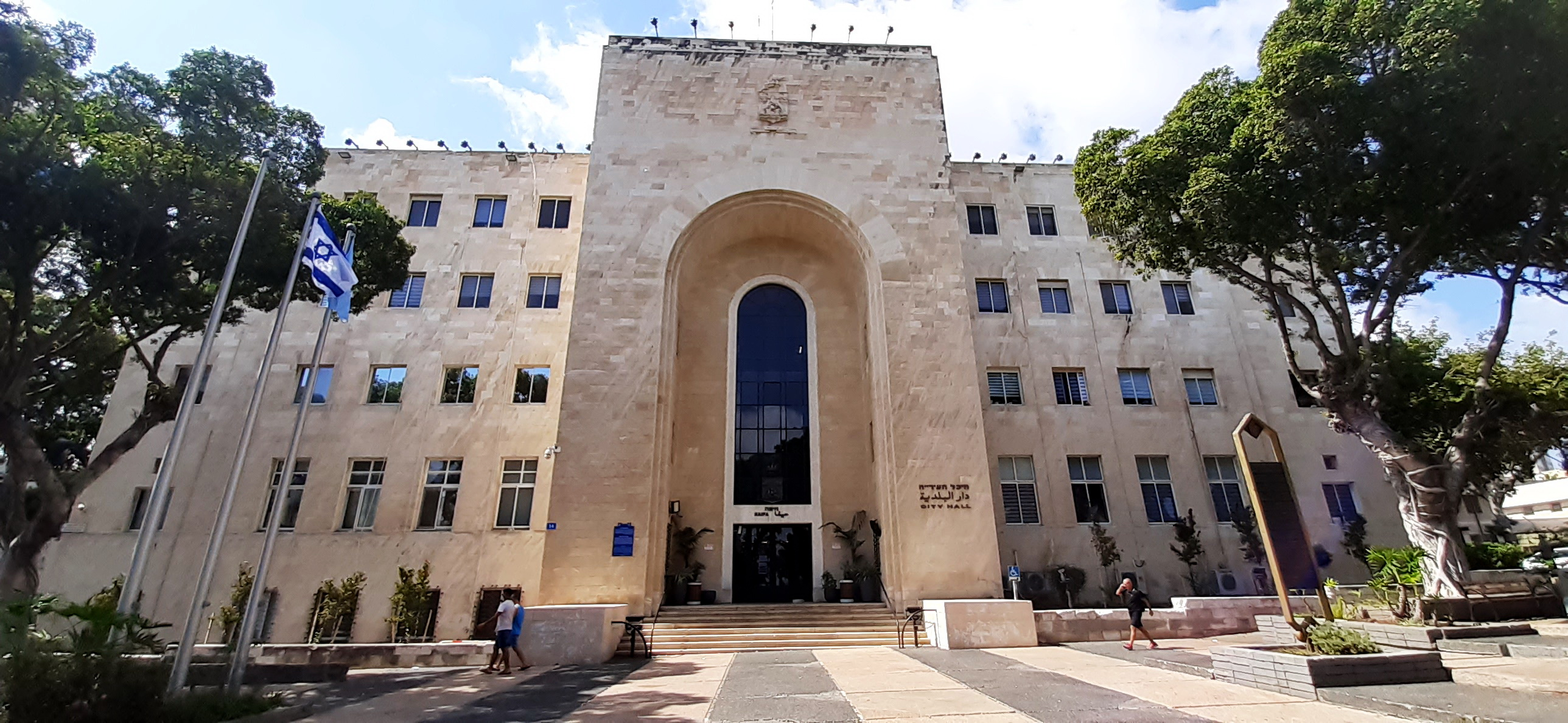
Haifa City Hall

- Najib Effendi al-Yasin (1873–77)
- Ahmad Effendi Jalabi (1878–81)
- Mustafa Bey al-Salih (1881–84)
- Mustafa Pasha al-Khalil (1885–1903)
- Jamil Sadiq (1904–10)
- Rif'at al-Salah (1910–11)
- Ibrahim al-Khalil (1911–13)
- Abd al-Rahman al-Haj (1920–27)
- Hassan Bey Shukri (1914–20, 1927–40)
- Shabtai Levy (1940–51)
- Abba Hushi (1951–1969)
- Moshe Flimann (1969–1973)
- Yosef Almogi (1974–1975)
- Yeruham Zeisel (1975–1978)
- Arie Gur'el (1978–1993)
- Amram Mitzna (1993–2003)
- Giora Fisher (interim mayor, 2003)
- Yona Yahav (2003–2018)
- Einat Kalisch-Rotem (2018–2024)
- Yona Yahav (2024–present)

== Voting Patterns ==
In the 2022 election, 54 percent of voters in Haifa voted for the parties of the center-left coalition led by Yair Lapid, while 34 percent voted for the parties of the right-wing coalition led by Benjamin Netanyahu and 9 percent voted for the Arab parties.

In the 2026 election, 55 percent of voters in Haifa voted for the parties of the center-left coalition led by Gadi Eisenkot, while 30 percent voted for the parties of the right-wing coalition led by Benjamin Netanyahu and 11 percent voted for the Arab parties. An additional 2.5 percent voted for the Reservists, and 1.4 percent voted for Amcha Yisrael. Voter turnout increased 18 percent from the 2022 election.

== Medical facilities ==
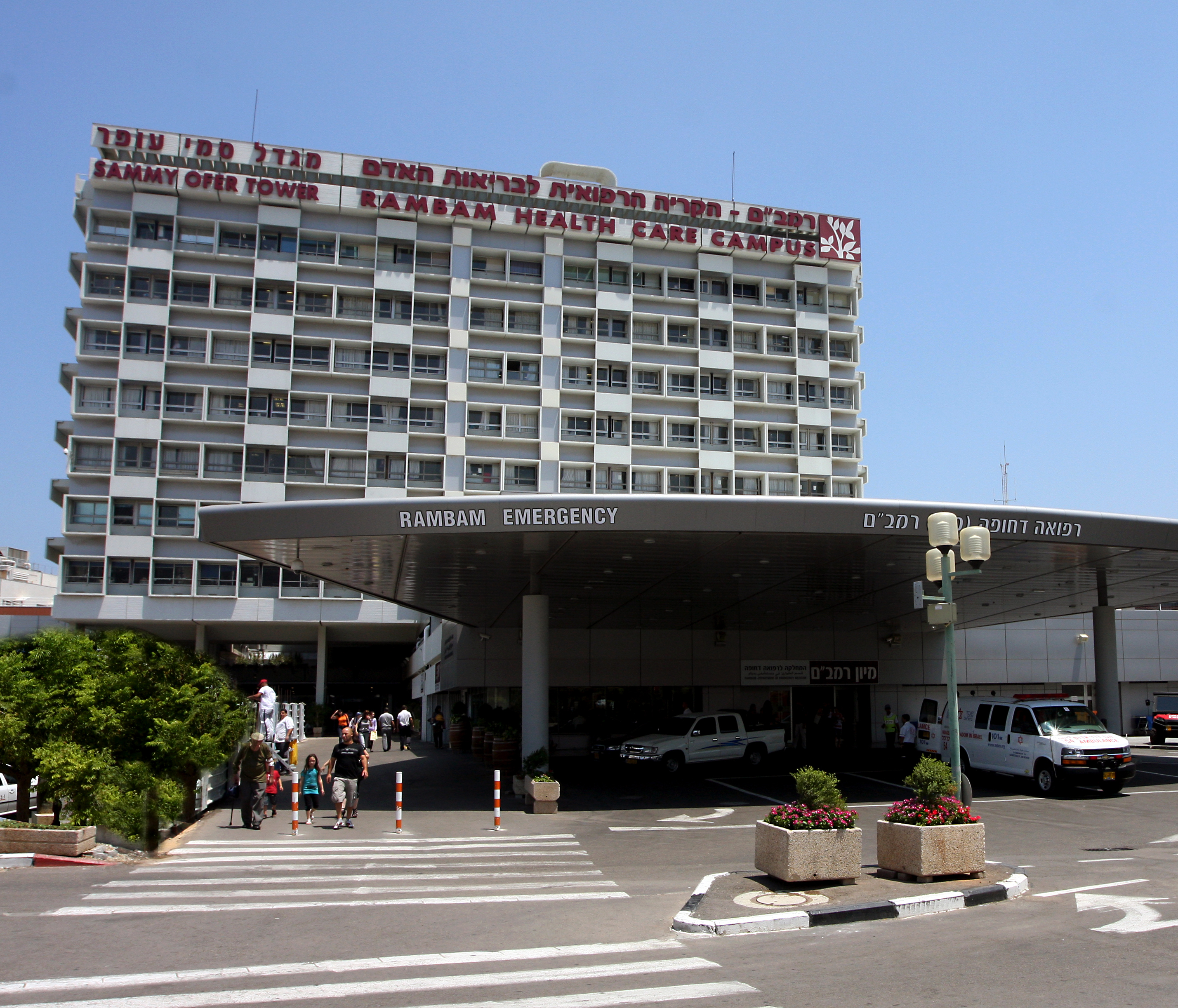
Rambam Medical Center

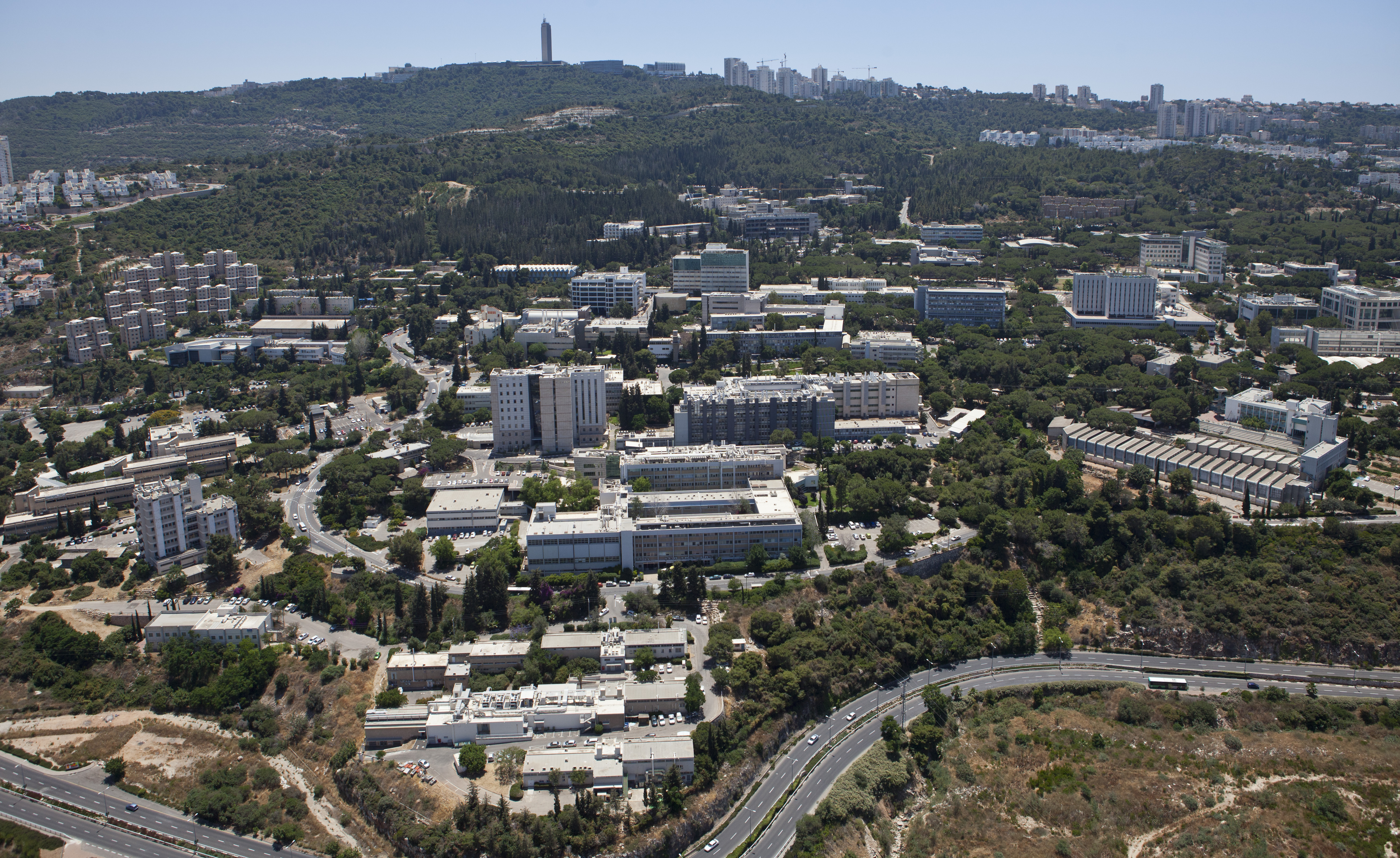
The Technion is the first higher education institution with teaching the Hebrew language. It was listed multiple tilmes in the top 100 of the Shanghai Academic Ranking of World Universities.

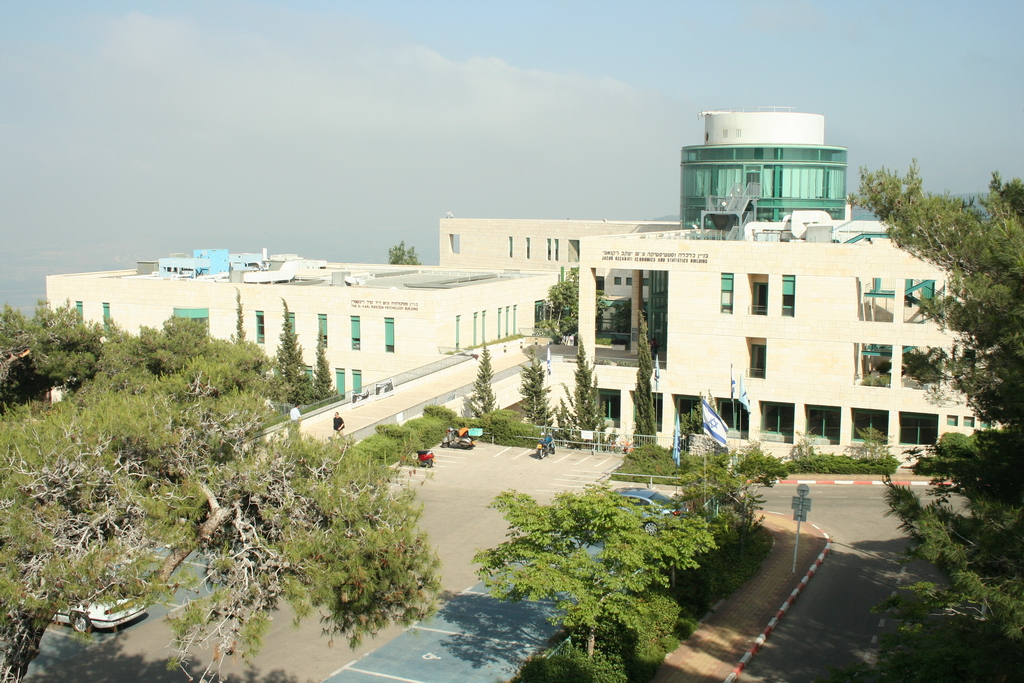
Rabin Building, University of Haifa

Haifa medical facilities have a total of 4,000 hospital beds. The largest hospital is the government-operated Rambam Hospital with 900 beds and 78,000 admissions in 2004. Bnai Zion Medical Center and Carmel Hospital each have 400 beds. Other hospitals in the city include the Italian Hospital, Elisha Hospital (100 beds), Horev Medical Center (36 beds) and Ramat Marpe (18 beds). Haifa has 20 family health centers. In 2004, there were a total of 177,478 hospital admissions. Rambam Medical Center was in the direct line of fire during the Second Lebanon War in 2006 and was forced to take special precautions to protect its patients. Whole wings of the hospital were moved to large underground shelters.

== Education ==
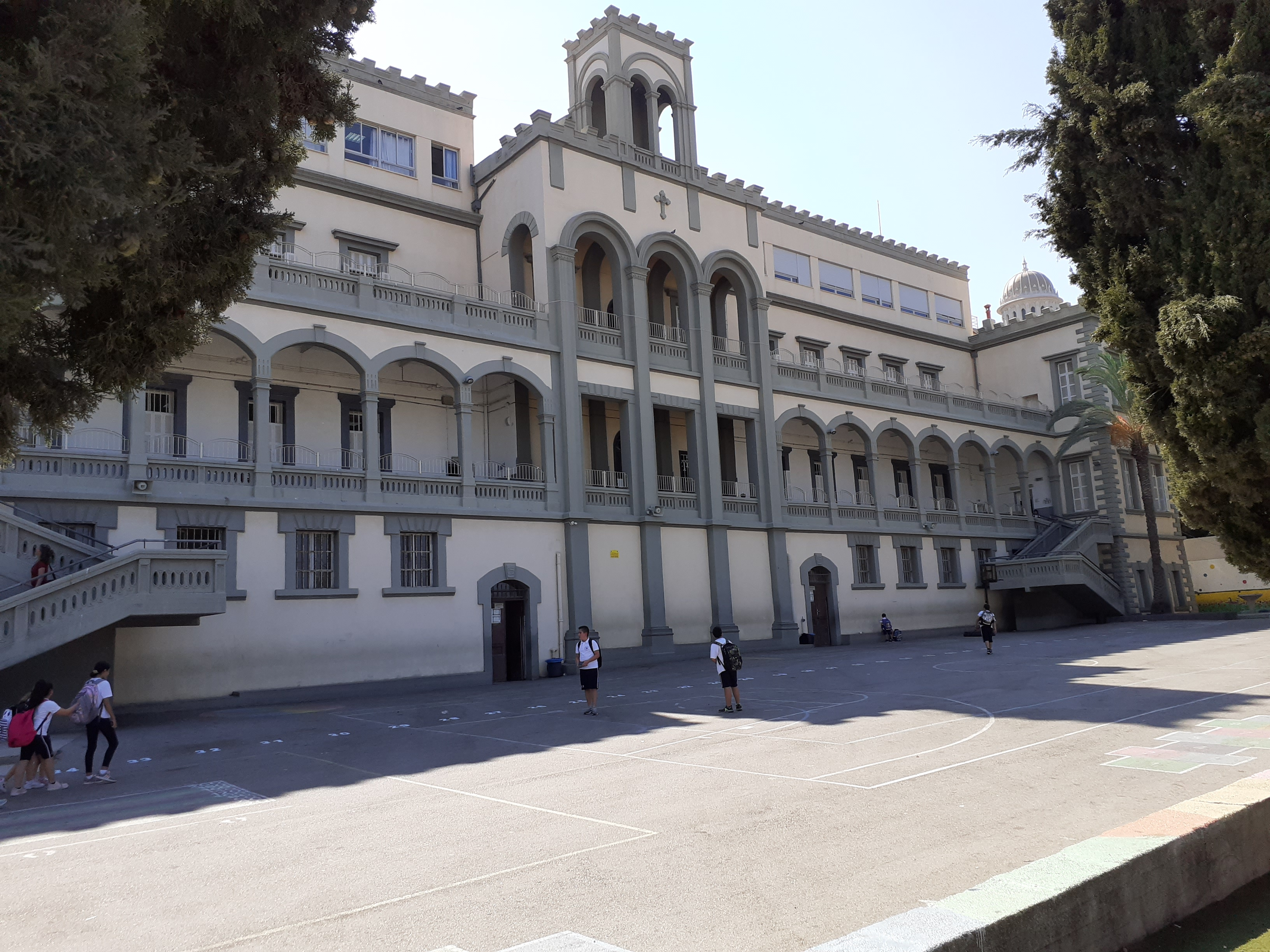
Nazareth Nuns' School, a prestigious Arabic school in Haifa.

Haifa is home to two internationally acclaimed universities and several colleges. The University of Haifa, founded in 1963, is at the top of Mt. Carmel. The campus was designed by the architect of Brasília and United Nations Headquarters in New York City, Oscar Niemeyer. The top floor of the 30-story Eshkol Tower provides a panoramic view of northern Israel. The Hecht Museum, with important archeology and art collections, is on the campus of Haifa University.

The Technion – Israel Institute of Technology, was founded in 1912, and became the first higher education institution where the language of teaching is Hebrew (see War of the Languages). It has 18 faculties and 42 research institutes. The original building now houses Israel National Museum of Science, Technology, and Space, also known as Madatech.

The Hebrew Reali School was founded in 1913. It is the largest k-12 school in Israel, with 4,000 students in 7 branches, all over the city.

The first technological high school in Israel, Bosmat, was established in Haifa in 1933. It was affiliated with the Technion. Because of financial difficulties, it was closed in 2007, and later re-established as part of the Mofet network, which was started by science teachers from the 1990s post-Soviet aliyah.

Other academic institutions in Haifa are the Gordon College of Education and Sha'anan Religious Teachers' College, the WIZO Haifa Academy of Design and Education, and Tiltan College of Design. The College of Management (Michlala Leminhal) and the Open University of Israel have branches in Haifa. The city also has a nursing college and the P.E.T Practical Engineering School.

Among Israeli higher education institutions the University of Haifa has the largest percentage (41%) of Arab-Israeli students. The Technion Israel Institute of Technology has the second largest percentage (22.2%) of Arab-Israeli students.

As of 2006–07, Haifa had 70 elementary schools, 23 middle schools, 28 academic high schools and 8 vocational high schools. There were 5,133 pupils in municipal kindergartens, 20,081 in elementary schools, 7,911 in middle schools, 8,072 in academic high schools, 2,646 in vocational high schools, and 2,068 in comprehensive district high schools. 86% of the students attended Hebrew-speaking schools and 14% attended Arab schools. 5% were in special education. In 2004, Haifa had 16 municipal libraries stocking 367,323 books. Two prestigious Arab schools in Haifa are the Orthodox School, run by the Greek Orthodox church, and the Nazareth Nuns' School, a Catholic institution. About 70% of Arab students in Haifa (Christians, Muslims, and Druze) attend Christian schools (6 schools) that found in the city.

== Transportation ==
=== Public transportation ===
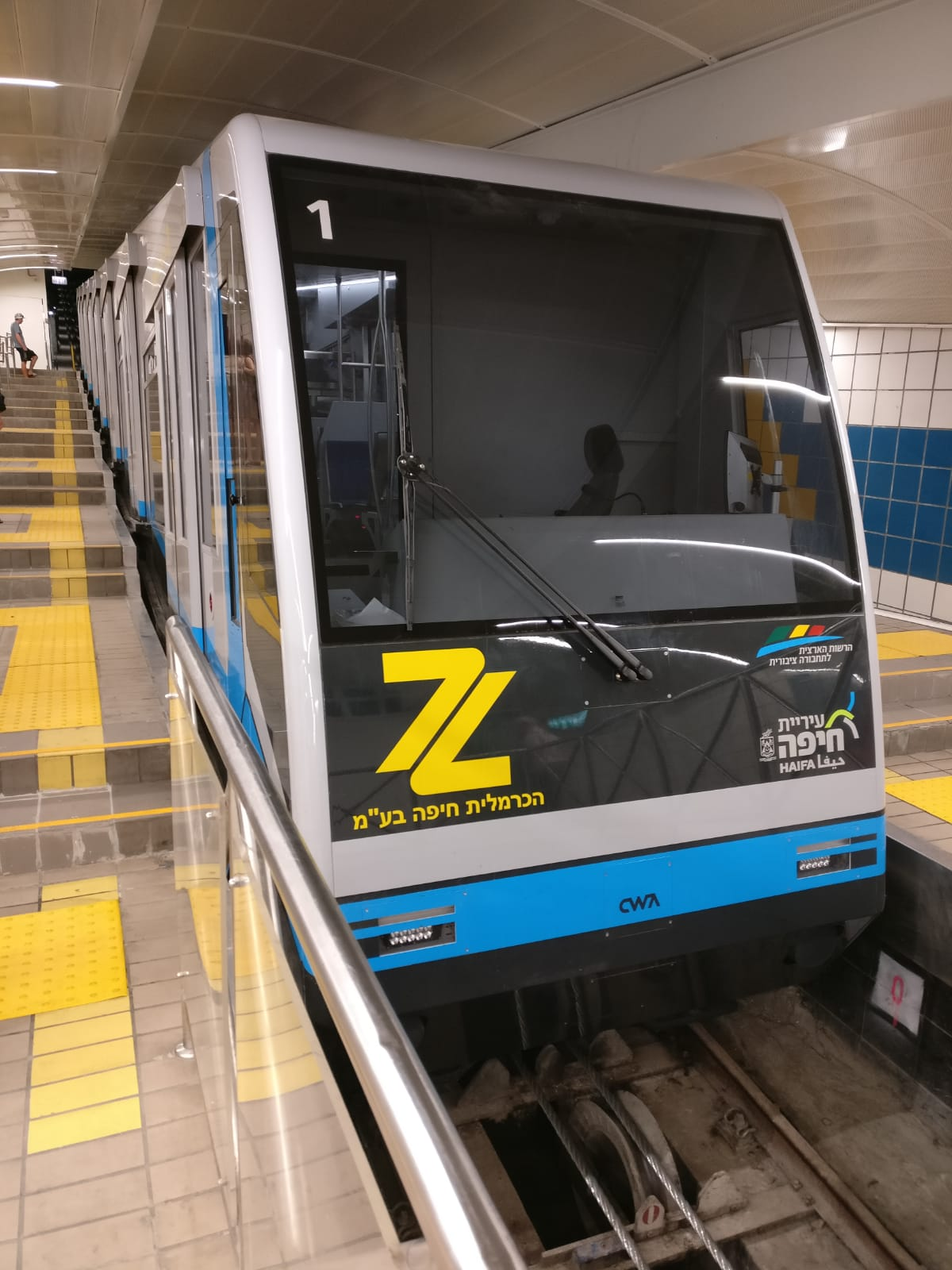
The Carmelit is currently Israel's only subway system.

Haifa is served by six railway stations and the Carmelit, currently Israel's only subway system (another is planned in Tel Aviv). The Nahariya–Tel Aviv Coastal Railway main line of Israel Railways runs along the coast of the Gulf of Haifa and has six stations within the city. From south-west to north-east, these stations are: Haifa Hof HaCarmel, Haifa Bat Galim, Haifa Merkaz HaShmona, HaMifrats Central, Hutzot HaMifratz and Kiryat Haim. Together with the Kiryat Motzkin Railway Station in the northern suburb Kiryat Motzkin, they form the Haifa – Krayot suburban line ("Parvarit"). There are direct trains from Haifa to Tel Aviv, Ben Gurion International Airport, Beersheba, Hadera, Herzliya, Modi'in, Nahariya, Karmiel, Akko, Kiryat Motzkin, Binyamina, Lod, Ramla, Beit Shemesh and others.

Haifa's intercity bus connections are operated almost exclusively by the Egged bus company, which operates two terminals:

- HaMifratz Central Bus Station, adjacent to the HaMifrats Central Railway Station
- Haifa Hof HaCarmel Central Bus Station, adjacent to the Hof HaCarmel Railway Station

Lines to the North of the country use HaMifratz Central Bus Station and their coverage includes most towns in the North of Israel. Lines heading south use Haifa Hof HaCarmel Central Bus Station.

Destinations directly reachable from Hof HaCarmel CBS include Tel Aviv, Jerusalem, Eilat, Raanana, Netanya, Hadera, Zikhron Ya'akov, Atlit, Tirat Carmel, Ben Gurion International Airport and intermediate communities. There are also three Egged lines that have their terminus in the Ramat Vizhnitz neighborhood and run to Jerusalem, Bnei Brak and Ashdod. These used to be "mehadrin" (i.e. gender segregated) lines.

All urban lines are run by Egged. There are also share taxis that run along some bus routes but do not have an official schedule. In 2006, Haifa implemented a trial network of neighborhood mini-buses – named "Shkhunatit" and run by Egged. In December 2012, GetTaxi, an app and taxi service which allows users to hail a cab using their smartphone without contacting the taxi station (by identifying and summoning the closest taxi) began operating. In the current initial phase, 50 taxis from the service are operating in Haifa.

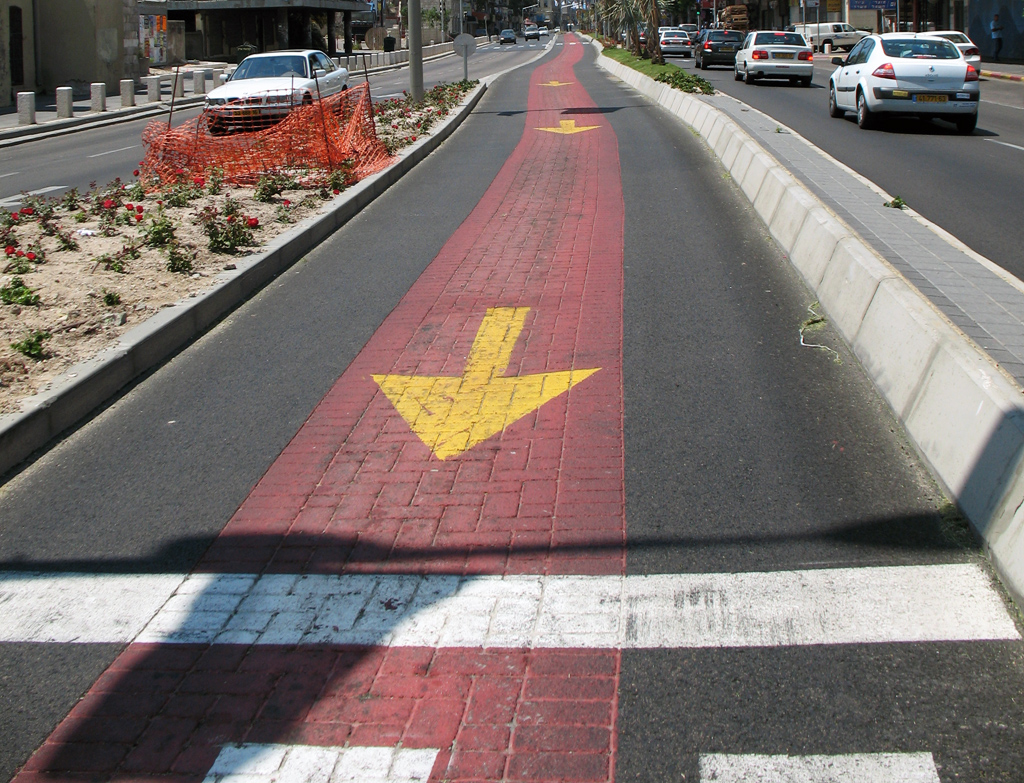
Completed Metronit track in downtown Haifa

Haifa and the Krayot suburbs also have a new Phileas concept bus rapid transit system called the Metronit. These buses, operating with hybrid engines, follow optical strips embedded in designated lanes of roads, providing tram-like public transportation services. The Metronit consists of 100 18-meter buses, each with the capacity for 150 passengers, operating along 40 km (25 mi) of designated roadways. The new system officially opened on 16 August 2013 serving three lines.

Haifa is one of the few cities in Israel where buses operate on Shabbat. Bus lines operate throughout the city on a reduced schedule from late Saturday morning onwards, and also connect Haifa with Nesher, Tirat Karmel, Yokneam, Nazareth, Nazareth Illit and intermediate communities. Since the summer of 2008, night buses are operated by Egged in Haifa (line 200) and the Krayot suburbs (line 210). During the summer of 2008 these lines operated 7 nights a week. Since 2013, along with route 1 of the Metronit, they operate 7 nights a week, making Haifa as the only city in Israel with 24/7 public transportation. Haifa is also the only city in Israel to operate a Saturday bus service to the beaches during summer time. Egged lines run during Saturday mornings from many neighborhoods to the Dado and Bat Galim beaches, and back in the afternoon.

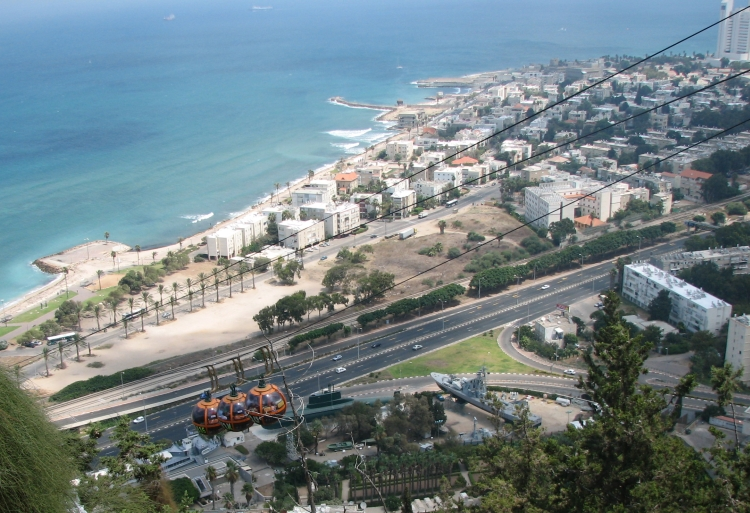
A Cable Car descending from Mount Carmel to Bat Galim

The Haifa subway system is called Carmelit. It is a subterranean funicular railway, running from downtown Paris Square to Gan HaEm (Mother's Park) on Mount Carmel. With a single track, six stations and two trains, it is listed in Guinness World Records as the world's shortest metro line. The Carmelit accommodates bicycles.

Haifa also has two cable cars. The Bat Galim cable car consists of six cabins and connects Bat Galim on the coast to the Stella Maris observation deck and monastery atop Mount Carmel. It serves mainly tourists. Opened in April 2022, Rakavlit, the second cable car, is a 4.4-kilometre commuter cable car service, running from HaMifratz Central Bus Station at the foot of Mount Carmel to the Technion, and then to the University of Haifa.

=== Air and sea transport ===
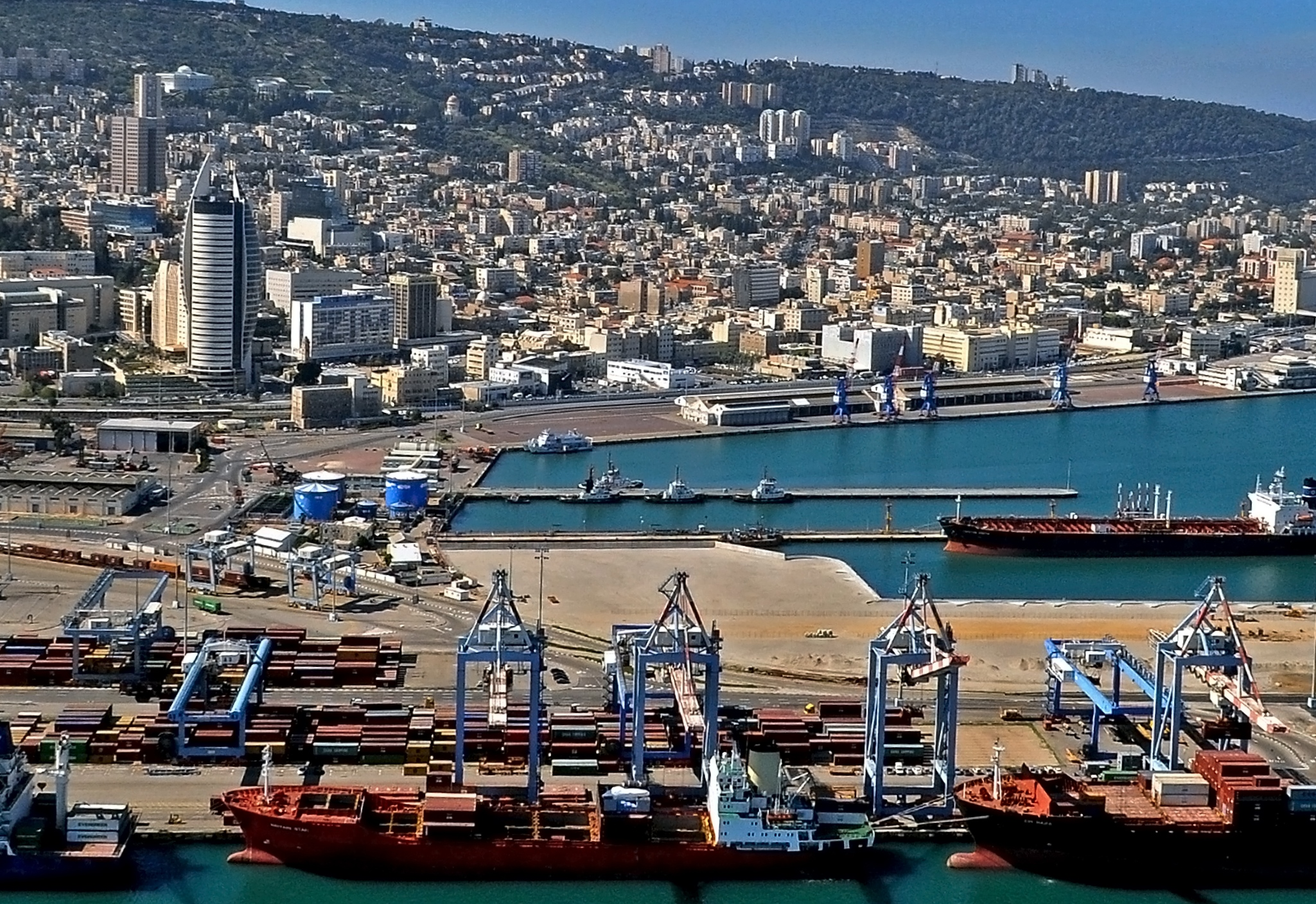
The Port of Haifa

Haifa Airport serves international charters to Cyprus (Larnaca and Paphos). Before COVID-19 pandemic Haifa Airport operated flights to Egypt, Greece, Jordan and Turkey as well as domestic flights to Tel Aviv (Sde Dov Airport) and Eilat (Eilat Airport).

There are currently plans to expand services from Haifa.

airHaifa is planning to launch operations during September 2024, when at the beginning it will issue flights on the Haifa-Eilat route and later it will also fly to Cyprus, Greece and Turkey.

=== Roads ===
Travel between Haifa and the center of the country is possible by road with Highway 2, the main highway along the coastal plain, beginning at Tel Aviv and ending at Haifa. Furthermore, Highway 4 runs along the coast to the north of Haifa, as well as south, inland from Highway 2. In the past, traffic along Highway 2 to the north of Haifa had to pass through the downtown area of the city. The Carmel Tunnels, opened for traffic 1 December 2010, now route this traffic under Mount Carmel, reducing congestion in the downtown area.

== Sports ==
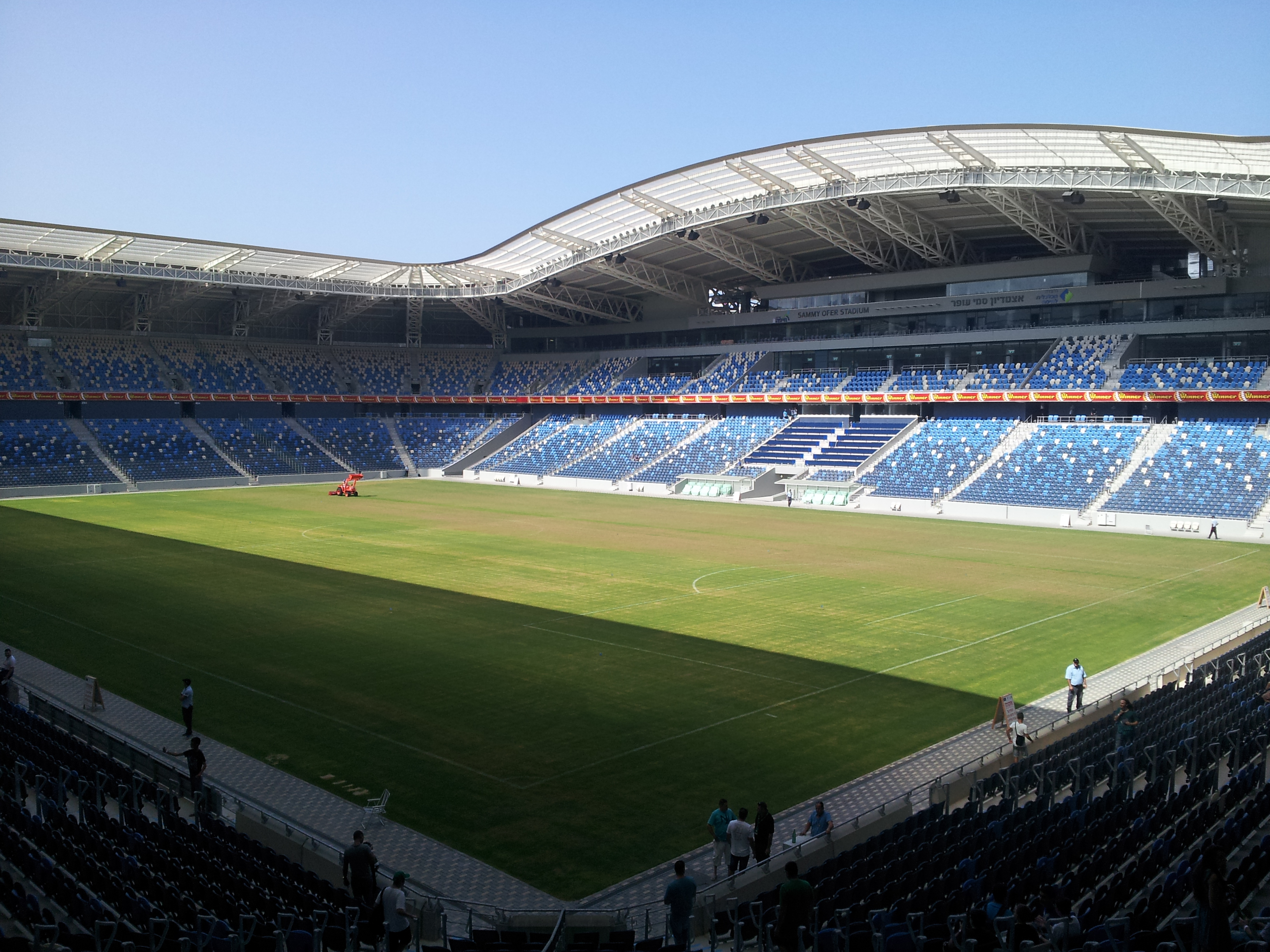
Sammy Ofer Stadium

The main stadiums in Haifa are: Sammy Ofer Stadium, a UEFA-approved 30,950-seat stadium, completed in 2014, replacing the 14,002-seat Kiryat Eliezer Stadium that was demolished 2016, Thomas D'Alesandro Stadium and Neve Sha'anan Athletic Stadium that seats 1,000. The city's two main football clubs are Maccabi Haifa and Hapoel Haifa who both currently play in the Israeli Premier League and share the Sammy Ofer Stadium as their home pitch. Maccabi has won twelve Israeli titles, while Hapoel has won one.

Haifa has 4 professional basketball clubs. Hapoel Haifa and Maccabi Haifa both play in the Israeli Basketball Super League, the top division. They both also play at the Romema Arena, which seats 5,000.

Maccabi Haifa Women plays in Israeli Female Basketball Premier League 1 division.

Hapoel Haifa Woman plays in the 3 division, the team plays at Kiryat Eliezer Arena.

The city also has an American football club, the Haifa Underdogs, that are a part of the Israeli Football League and play in Yoqneam Stadium. The team lost in the championship game of the league's inaugural season, but won one title as part of American Football Israel, which merged with the Israeli Football League in 2005. The city has several clubs in the regional leagues, including Beitar Haifa in Liga Bet (the fourth tier) and Hapoel Ahva Haifa, F.C. Haifa Ruby Shapira and Maccabi Neve Sha'anan Eldad in Liga Gimel (the fifth tier). The Haifa Hawks are an ice hockey team based out of the city of Haifa. They participate in the Israeli League, the top level of Israeli ice hockey. In 1996, the city hosted the World Windsurfing Championship. The Haifa Tennis Club, near the southwest entrance to the city, is one of the largest in Israel. John Shecter, Olympic horse breeder and owner of triple cup champion Shergar was born here.

== Notable people ==
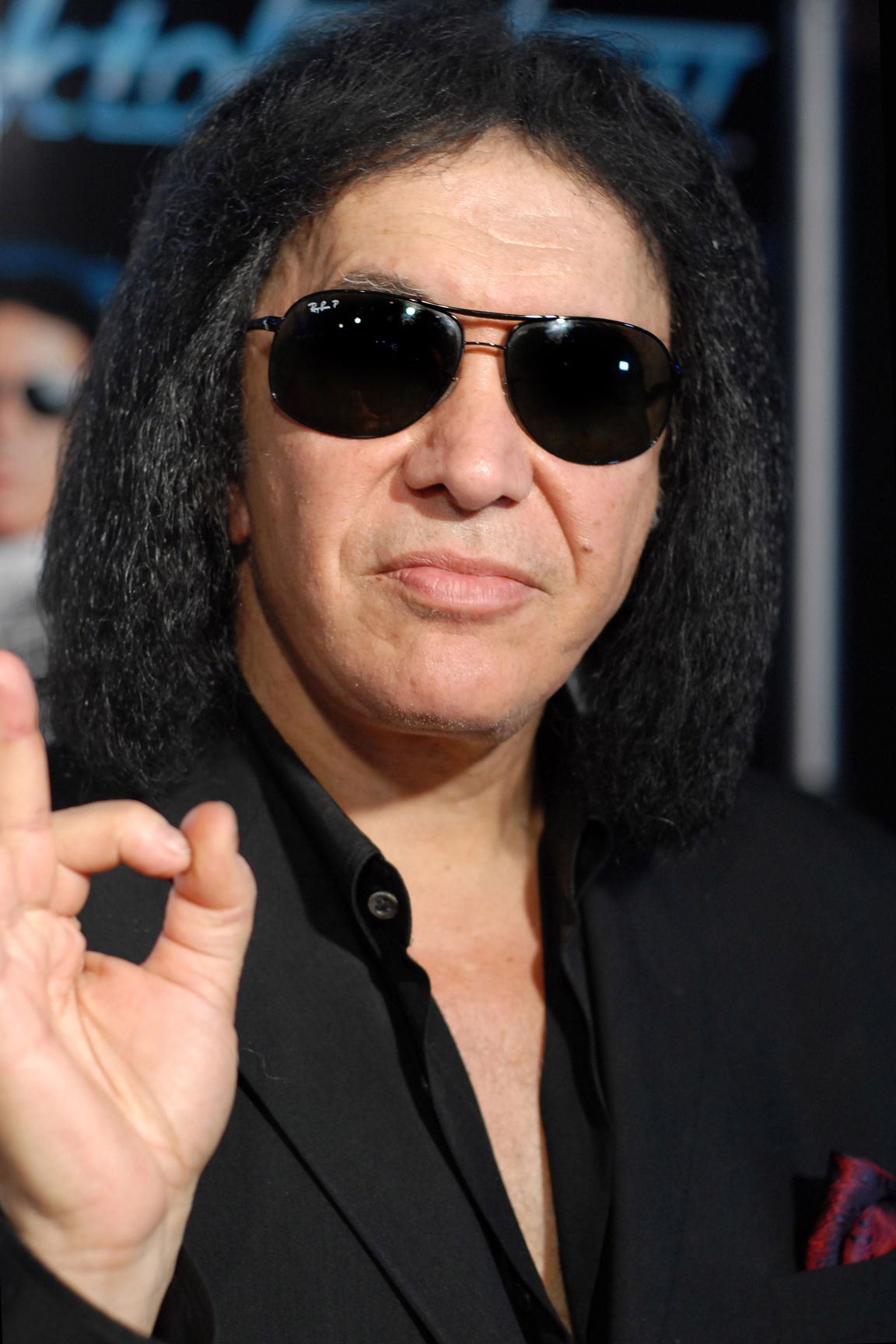
Gene Simmons

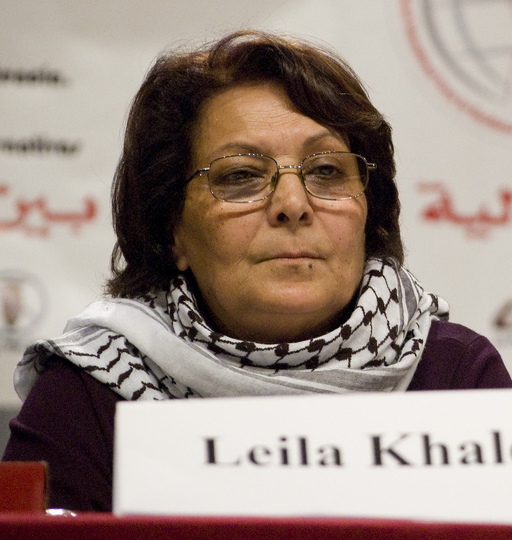
Leila Khaled

- Abed Abdi (born 1942), Arab Palestinian painter and sculptor
- Ralph Bakshi (born 1938), animator and filmmaker
- Orr Barouch (born 1991), footballer
- Naftali Bennett (born 1972), politician
- Herzl Bodinger (1943–2025), general in the Israel Defense Forces who served from 1992 to 1996 as twelfth Commander of the Israeli Air Force
- Aaron Ciechanover (born 1947), biologist; Nobel Prize, Chemistry
- Jonathan Erlich (born 1977), tennis player
- Ari Folman (born 1962), filmmaker, creator of Waltz with Bashir
- Anastasia Gorbenko (born 2003), swimmer
- Lea Gottlieb (1918–2012), founder and fashion designer of Gottex
- Avram Hershko (born 1937), biochemist, 2004 Nobel Prize, Chemistry
- Leila Khaled (born 1944), former Palestinian militant and hijacker
- Jonatan Kopelev (born 1991), swimmer
- Shiri Maimon (born 1981), Hebrew singer, represented Israel in Eurovision 2005
- Adam Maraana (born 2003), swimmer
- Shahar Perkiss (born 1962), tennis player
- Yehuda Poliker (born 1950), Hebrew songwriter and folk singer
- Odeya Rush (born 1997), Hollywood actress and model
- Shem-Tov Sabag (born 1959), Olympic marathoner
- Yulia Sachkov (born 1999), world champion kickboxer
- Shachar Sagiv (born 1994), Olympic triathlete
- Gene Simmons (born 1949), musician who was the bassist and co-lead singer of the hard rock band Kiss
- Josef Singer (1923–2009), President of Technion – Israel Institute of Technology
- Uri Sivan (born 1955), physicist, professor, and President of the Technion – Israel Institute of Technology
- Hillel Slovak (1962–1988), founding guitarist of the Red Hot Chili Peppers
- Lior Suchard (born 1981), mentalist
- Keren Tzur (born 1974), actress
- Avi Wigderson (born 1956), mathematician and computer scientist, recipient of the 2021 Abel Prize

== Major terrorist attacks ==
- Haifa Oil Refinery massacre (1947)
- Haifa bus 16 suicide bombing (2001)
- Matza restaurant suicide bombing (2002)
- Haifa bus 37 suicide bombing (2003)
- Maxim restaurant suicide bombing (2003)

== Twin towns – sister cities ==
Haifa is twinned with:

- Marseille, France (1962)
- Portsmouth, United Kingdom (1962)
- Hackney, United Kingdom (1968)
- Manila, Philippines (1971)
- San Francisco, United States (1973)
- Aalborg, Denmark (1973)
- Cape Town, South Africa (1975)
- Bremen, Germany (1978)
- Newcastle upon Tyne, United Kingdom (1979)
- Antwerp, Belgium (1986)
- Mainz, Germany (1987)
- Düsseldorf, Germany (1988)
- Rosario, Argentina (1988)
- Odesa, Ukraine (1992)
- Shanghai, China (1994)
- Limassol, Cyprus (2000)
- Fort Lauderdale, United States (2002)
- Erfurt, Germany (2005)
- Mannheim, Germany (2005)
- Shenzhen, China (2012)
- Chengdu, China (2013)
- Shantou, China (2015)

== See also ==
- Haifa Pride
- List of people from Haifa
- Wikimania 2011
- List of clock towers – Haifa has an Ottoman clock tower next to the El-Jarina Mosque and the Saraya (government house), inaugurated c. 1898-1900

== Sources ==
- Abu-Husayn, Abdul-Rahim (1985). Provincial Leaderships in Syria, 1575–1650. Beirut: American University of Beirut. ISBN 9780815660729.
- Lane-Poole, Stanley (1906). Saladin and the Fall of the Kingdom of Jerusalem. Heroes of the Nations. London: G. P. Putnam's Sons.
- Sharon, Moshe (1975). "The Political Role of the Bedouins in Palestine in the Sixteenth and Seventeenth Centuries". In Ma'oz, Moshe (ed.). Studies on Palestine During the Ottoman Period. Jerusalem: The Magnes Press. ISBN 978-965-223-589-3. OCLC 2298443.
- Yazbak, Mahmoud (1998). Haifa in the Late Ottoman Period, 1864–1914: A Muslim Town in Transition. Leiden, Boston and Köln: Brill. ISBN 90-04-11051-8.
- Ze'evi, Dror (1996). An Ottoman Century: The District of Jerusalem in the 1600s. Albany: State University of New York Press. ISBN 0-7914-2915-6.
