= Timeline of Haifa =

Coordinates: 32.816667°N 34.983333°E

The following is a timeline of the history of the city of Haifa, Israel.

== Prior to 20th century ==
- 1047 – Persian traveler Nasir Khusraw visits village.
- 1100 or 1101 – a Crusader fleet and land army conquer Haifa. The Crusaders rename it Caiphas.
- 1187 – Saladin captures Haifa.
- 1251 – Fortifications built by Louis IX of France (approximate date).
- 1291 – Mamluk Al-Ashraf Khalil captures Haifa.
- 1869 – German Colony established near town.
- 1873 – Najib Effendi al-Yasin becomes mayor.
- 1883 – Rushdi school opens.
- 1887 – Haifa becomes part of the Ottoman Beirut Vilayet.
- 1898 – Pier and Jaffa-Haifa roadway built.
- 1900 - Population: estimate 12,000.

== 20th century ==
- 1905 – Hejaz Railroad branch begins operating; train station built.
- 1908 – Al-Karmil newspaper begins publication.
- 1909 – Shrine of the Báb built on Mt. Carmel.
- 1912 – Maccabi Haifa sport club formed.
- 1913 – Hebrew Reali School and Maccabi Haifa Football Club established.
- 1918 – 23 September: Haifa occupied by British forces.
- 1921 – Haifa Chamber of Commerce and Industry established.
- 1922 – Population: 24,600.
- 1924
  - Technion – Israel Institute of Technology opens.
  - Hapoel Haifa Football Club formed.
- 1928 – Stella Maris Light built.
- 1931 – Population: 50,403.
- 1933 – Port of Haifa expanded.
- 1934 – Haifa Airport established.
- 1935
  - Mosul–Haifa oil pipeline commissioned. Refinery starts production in 1939. Pipeline deliveries stop in 1948.
  - Armon Cinema opens.
- 1937 – Orah Cinema in business (approximate date).
- 1938 – British Government Hospital established.
- 1939 – Oil refinery built.
- 1941 – Shabtai Levy becomes mayor.
- 1944 – Al-Ittihad newspaper begins publication.
- 1947 – Population: 145,140.
- 1948
  - April: Battle of Haifa (1948).
  - Haifa becomes part of the State of Israel.
- 1950 – New Haifa Symphony Orchestra established.
- 1951
  - Haifa Museum of Art established.
  - Abba Hushi becomes mayor.
  - Al-Jadid literary journal begins publication.
- 1953 – Gordon College of Education established.
- 1955 – Kiryat Eliezer Stadium opens.
- 1959 – Haifa Underground Funicular Railway begins operating.
- 1960 – Tikotin Museum of Japanese Art opens on Mt. Carmel.
- 1961
  - Haifa Theatre founded.
  - Population: 183,021.
- 1963 – University of Haifa established.
- 1969
  - Technion's Rappaport Faculty of Medicine established.
  - Moshe Flimann becomes mayor.
  - Clandestine Immigration and Naval Museum opens.
- 1971 – WIZO Haifa Academy of Design and Education established.
- 1972
  - IBM Haifa Research Laboratory established.
  - Israeli National Maritime Museum opens.
- 1973 – Sister city relationship established with San Francisco, USA.
- 1974
  - Matam hi-tech area developed.
  - Yosef Almogi becomes mayor.
- 1975
  - Haifa Cinematheque established.
  - Yeruham Zeisel becomes mayor.
- 1976 – Romema Arena opens.
- 1978 – Aryeh Gur'el becomes mayor.
- 1983
  - Haifa International Film Festival begins.
  - Israel Railway Museum opens.
  - Population: 225,775.
- 1984 – Hecht Museum established.
- 1989 – September: 1989 Mount Carmel forest fire.
- 1991 – Lev HaMifratz Mall in business.
- 1993 – Amram Mitzna becomes mayor.
- 1999 – Grand Canyon (mall) and Carmel Beach Railway Station open.

== 21st century ==
- 2001 – Hutzot HaMifratz Railway Station and Lev HaMifratz Railway Station open.
- 2002
  - Sail Tower built.
  - Haifa Bay Central Bus Station opens.
- 2003
  - Yona Yahav becomes mayor.
  - IEC Tower built.
  - Carmel Beach Central Bus Station opens.
- 2004 – Almadina newspaper begins publication.
- 2006 – 13 July: Haifa bombarded by Lebanese Hezbollah forces.
- 2008 – Bahá'í World Centre designated an UNESCO World Heritage Site.
- 2010
  - December: 2010 Mount Carmel forest fire.
  - Carmel Tunnels open.
- 2011 – Wikimania 2011 held in Haifa.
- 2012 – Israeli Personal Computer Museum opens.
- 2013 – Population: 272,181.
- 2014 – Sammy Ofer Stadium opens.
- 2016 – November 2016 Israel wildfires

== See also ==
- History of Haifa
- Timelines of other cities in Israel: Tel Aviv (+ Jaffa)
- Timeline of Jerusalem

== Bibliography ==
- "Haifa", Handbook for Travellers in Syria and Palestine, London: J. Murray, 1858, OCLC 2300777
- "Haifa, Sycaminum", Palestine and Syria, Leipsig: Karl Baedeker, 1876
- M. Franco (1907), "Haifa", Jewish Encyclopedia, vol. 6, New York
- "Haifa" . Encyclopædia Britannica. Vol. 12 (11th ed.). 1910. p. 820.
- Mahmoud Yazbak (1998). Haifa in the Late Ottoman Period, 1864–1914: A Muslim Town in Transition. Brill. ISBN 90-04-11051-8.
- May Seikaly (2000). Haifa: Transformation of an Arab Society, 1918–39. I.B.Tauris. ISBN 978-0-85771-842-6.
- Philip Mattar (2005). "Haifa". Encyclopedia of the Palestinians. Facts on File. p. 192. ISBN 978-0-8160-6986-6.
- C. Edmund Bosworth, ed. (2007). "Haifa". Historic Cities of the Islamic World. Leiden: Koninklijke Brill. p. 149+. ISBN 978-9004153882.
- Michael R.T. Dumper; Bruce E. Stanley, eds. (2008), "Haifa", Cities of the Middle East and North Africa, Santa Barbara, USA: ABC-CLIO
- Gabor Agoston and Bruce Alan Masters, ed. (2009). "Haifa". Encyclopedia of the Ottoman Empire. Facts on File. p. 246. ISBN 978-1-4381-1025-7.
- Alex Carmel (2010). Ottoman Haifa: A History of Four Centuries under Turkish Rule. Library of Middle East History (Book 2). London: I. B. Tauris. p. 2 of the Introduction. ISBN 9781848855601.
