= Timeline of Tel Aviv =

Coordinates: 32°5′0″N 34°48′0″E

The following is a timeline of the history of the city of Tel Aviv, Israel.

== 19th century ==
- 1886 – Neve-Tzedek was founded.
- 1890 – Neve Shalom was founded.
- 1896 – Yafa Nof was founded.
- 1899 – Achva was founded.

== 20th century ==
=== 1900s ===
- 1904 – Ohel Moshe was founded.
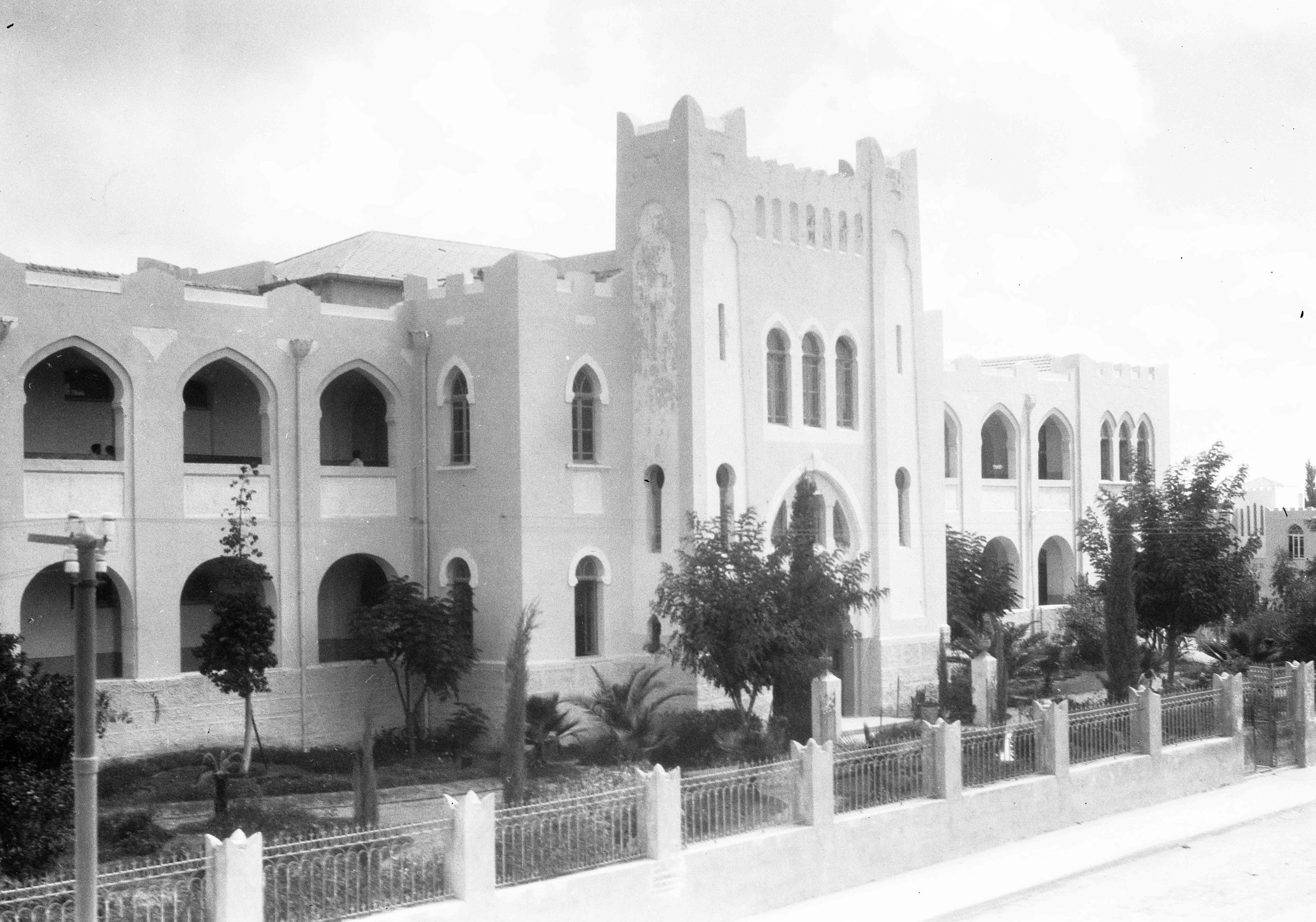
- Herzliya Hebrew Gymnasium
  1905 - Herzliya Hebrew Gymnasium, the first Hebrew Highschool was founded.
- 1906 – Kerem HaTeimanim was founded.
- 1909 – Tel Aviv founded as neighborhood in Jaffa.

=== 1910s ===
- 1917 – April: Tel Aviv and Jaffa deportation.

=== 1920s ===
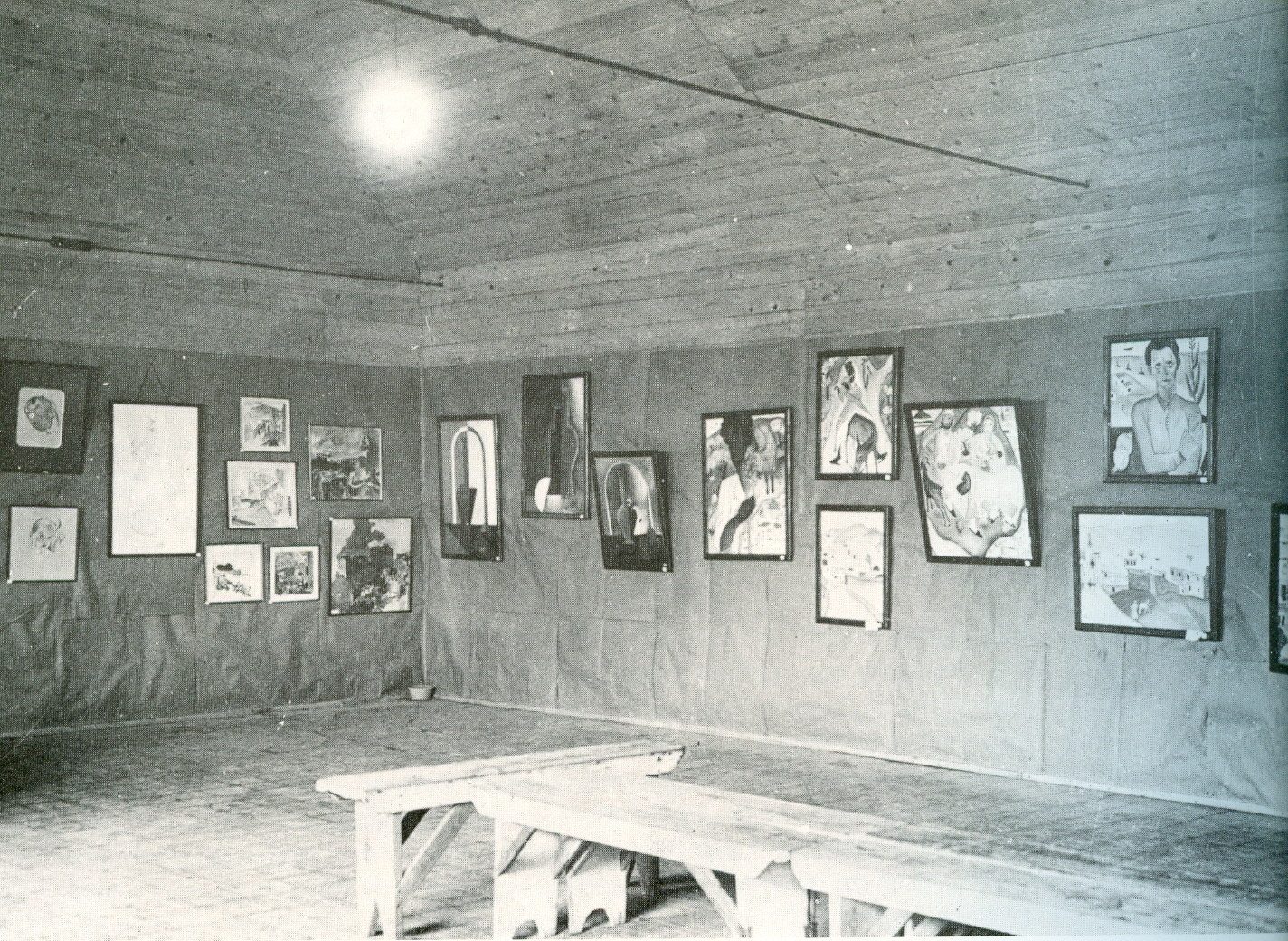
Ohel theatre exhibition, the first modern art exhibition in the land of Israel in which participated Tel Aviv's Histadrut Art Studio

- 1921 – Meir Dizengoff becomes mayor.
- 1925 – David Bloch-Blumenfeld becomes mayor.
- 1926 - The Histadrut art school, the first modern art academy in Israel, is founded by Yitzhak Frenkel.

=== 1930s ===
- 1930s – White City built.
- 1932
  - Tel Aviv Museum of Art established.
  - Maccabiah Stadium opens.
- 1936 – Israel Rokach becomes mayor.
- 1938 – Jaffa Zoo opens.
- 1939 – Yedioth Ahronoth newspaper begins publication.

=== 1940s ===
- 1941 – Tel Aviv Central Bus Station opens.
- 1948 – Population: 244,614.

=== 1950s ===
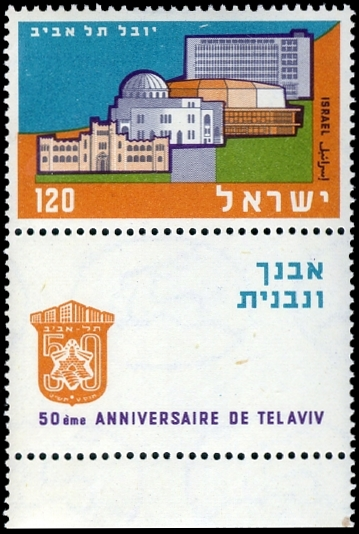
Israeli postal stamp, 1959, commemorating the 50th anniversary of the founding of the city

- 1950
  - Tel Aviv-Jaffa municipality formed.
  - Chen Cinema opens.
- 1951 – Ramat Gan Stadium opens near Tel Aviv.
- 1953
  - Tel Aviv Stock Exchange founded.
  - Chaim Levanon becomes mayor.
- 1959 - 1961 - Historic building of Herzliya Hebrew Gymnasium destroyed sparking conservation movement in Israel.

=== 1960s ===
- 1960
  - Mordechai Namir becomes mayor.
  - Israel Sports Center for the Disabled established near city.
- 1962 – Bloomfield Stadium opens.
- 1963 – Yad Eliyahu Arena opens.
- 1964 – November: 16th Chess Olympiad held.
- 1965 – Shalom Meir Tower built.
- 1968 – November: 1968 Summer Paralympics.
- 1969 – Yehoshua Rabinovitz becomes mayor.

=== 1970s ===
- 1970
  - Luna Park (amusement park) built.
  - Nasha Strana Russian-language newspaper in publication.
- 1972 – London Ministores Mall built.
- 1973 – Yarkon Park and Tel Aviv Cinematheque open.
- 1974 – Shlomo Lahat becomes mayor.

=== 1980s ===
- 1983 – Dizengoff Center (shopping mall) in business.
- 1987 – Marganit Tower built.
- 1989 – Suzanne Dellal Center for Dance and Theater established.

=== 1990s ===
- 1990 – Tel Aviv 2000 Terminal (bus station) built.
- 1993
  - Roni Milo becomes mayor.
  - Opera Tower built.
- 1994 – 19 October: Dizengoff Street bus bombing.
- 1995 – 4 November: Assassination of Yitzhak Rabin.
- 1996 – 4 March: Dizengoff Center suicide bombing.
- 1997 – Isrotel Tower built.
- 1998
  - Ron Huldai becomes mayor.
  - Center for Contemporary Art founded.
- 1999 – Azrieli Center, Tzameret Towers, and Beit Rubinstein hi-rise built.

=== 2000s ===
- 2000
  - Tel Aviv University Railway Station opens.
  - Levinstein Tower and Tel Aviv Towers built.

== 21st century ==
- 2003 – Matcal Tower and Tel Aviv Convention Center pavilion built.
- 2005 – Kirya Tower built.
- 2006
  - Bank Discount Tower built.
  - Tel Aviv LGBT Film Festival begins.
- 2007 – Neve Tzedek Tower built.
- 2009
  - Tel Aviv-Yafo Centennial.
  - First International Bank Tower and Vision Tower built.
  - Tel Aviv gay centre shooting

=== 2010s ===
- 2011
  - Elco Tower built.
  - Tel Aviv Light Rail construction begins.
- 2013 – Population: 414,600.
- 2013 – Eurovision Song Contest 2019 held.

=== 2020s ===
- 2023 – Tel Aviv Light Rail opens.
- 2025
  - 2025 Houthi attack on Tel Aviv airport: A ballistic missile launched by the Houthis strikes near Ben Gurion Airport, injuring eight people and temporarily halting air traffic.
  - The 2025–26 Toto Cup Al takes place, with Beitar Jerusalem finishing as champions.
- 2026 – Dutch airline KLM announces the suspension of its Amsterdam–Tel Aviv route.

== See also ==
- History of Tel Aviv
- Timeline of Jaffa
- Timeline of Jerusalem
- Timeline of Haifa
- Timeline of Israeli history
- List of cities in Israel

== Bibliography ==
- Judith R. Baskin, ed. (2011). "Tel Aviv". Cambridge Dictionary of Judaism and Jewish Culture. Cambridge University Press. ISBN 978-1-316-15426-7.
