= Yeruham Zeisel =

Mayor of Haifa, Israel, in the 1970s

- ירוהאם זייזל
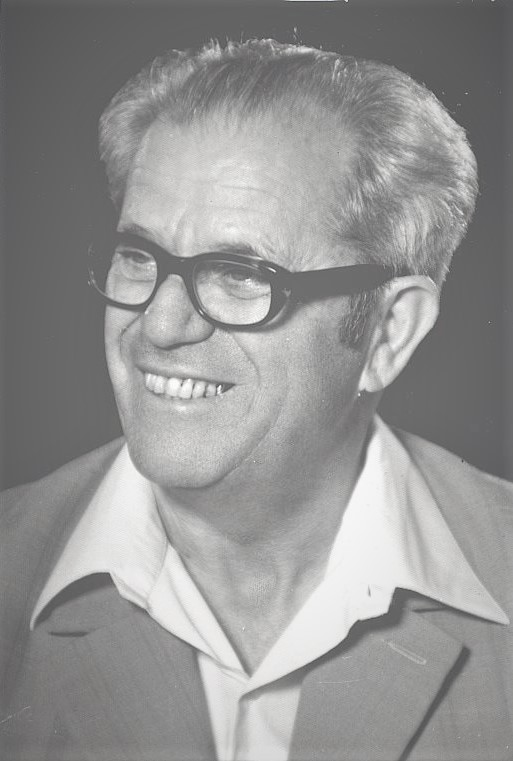

5th Mayor of Haifa
- In office 1975–1978
- Preceded by: Yosef Almogi
- Succeeded by: Aryeh Gur'el

Personal details
- Born: 1909 Tarnov, Austria-Hungary
- Died: 26 May 1987 (aged 77–78) Israel

Yeruham Zeisel (Hebrew: ירוהאם זייזל; 1909 – May 26, 1987) was an Israeli politician who served as the Mayor of Haifa from 1975 to 1978.

== Biography ==
Yeruham Zeisel was born in 1909 in Tarnov, Galicia (then Austria-Hungary, today Poland). Zeisel was raised in a Zionist home, and already in his youth was a member of Hashomer Hatzair and a counselor for a group of youths in the "Pioneer" movement. In 1932 he made Aliyah and joined kibbutz Ein HaMifratz. He also worked as a porter in the Post of Haifa, and worked in the digging of fish pools in the area of the swamps of the Ne'eman Valley.

In 1933, Zeisel moved to Haifa, and began work as an electrician for the Israel Electric Corporation. Zeisel was a member of the Haganah, and served as the metalworkers' secretary. In 1936, he moved to Kiryat Chaim.

Zeisel was elected to the Haifa city council in 1961, and eight years later, in 1969, he was elected to the position of vice-mayor. Due to the illness of then-mayor Moshe Flimann, Zeisel was appointed substitute mayor. With Flimann's subsequent death, Zeisel remained in office, and served in that capacity until the election of Yosef Almogi in 1974. Almog's term didn't last long: in 1975 he was chosen to be the chairman of the Jewish Agency and the Histadrut. It was then that Zeisel was elected as mayor of Haifa, and he served until 1978. During his time in office, construction of the promenade in Bat Galim began.

In 1979, Zeisel was chosen to serve as the head of the secondary council of Kiriyat Chaim; he held that post until the day he died.

Preceded by Yosef Almogi	Mayor of Haifa; 1975–1978	Succeeded by Arie Gur'el
