= Amnon Linn =

Israeli politician (1924–2016)

- אמנון לין
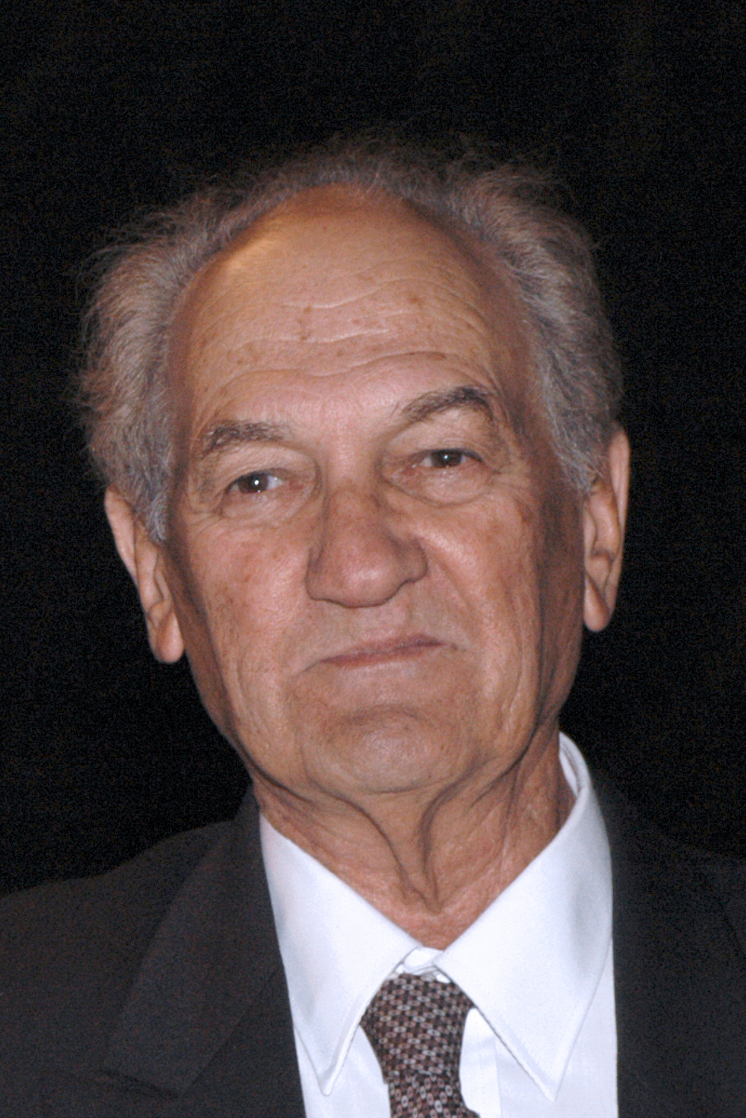

Member of the Knesset
- Years: Faction
- 1967–1968: Alignment
- 1968–1969: Labor Party
- 1969: Alignment
- 1974–1982: Likud
- 1982–1988: Alignment

Personal details
- Born: 29 March 1924 Mishmar HaEmek, Mandatory Palestine
- Died: 21 July 2016 (aged 92) Haifa
- Resting place: Carmel Beach Cemetery
- Education: Hebrew University of Jerusalem Tel Aviv School of Law and Economics

Amnon Linn (Hebrew: אמנון לין; 29 March 1924 – 21 July 2016) was an Israeli politician, jurist and member of Knesset.

== Biography ==
Amnon Linn was born in Mishmar HaEmek. His parents were Hava and David (Dodia) Linkovich (later Linn). He became a member of the Hashomer Hatzair youth movement in 1940, and in 1942 joined the Palmach. He was injured in a training accident and dismissed. He met his wife, Ruth Hushi, daughter of Abba Hushi in 1945, and married her later that same year. He has two sons - Shai and Ran, and one daughter - Orna.

After he recovered from his injury he returned to the Haganah. He studied at the officers' course at the time of the War of Independence and served in the Carmeli Brigade. In this capacity, he took part in the Battle of Haifa. He studied law at the Tel Aviv School of Law and Economics.

== Political career ==
Linn joined Mapai, the ruling party, in 1951. Fluent in Arabic, he was appointed director of the Arab Department of the party in the north of the country, a job he held until 1965 when he became national Director of the Arab Department. In the same year Mapai and Ahdut HaAvoda merged to form the Alignment.

In the 1965 elections he narrowly missed out on winning a seat in the Knesset; he was placed 48th on the Alignment's list, but the party won only 45 seats. However, following the resignation of two Alignment MKs and the death of Minister of Police Bechor-Shalom Sheetrit, Linn entered the Knesset in 1967. However, he lost his seat in the 1969 elections.

Linn returned to the Knesset after the 1973 election, this time as a member of Likud. He was re-elected in 1977 and 1981, but in 1982, along with most other members of the Movement for Haifa and the North (which he had founded in 1977), he defected back to the Alignment. He was re-elected in 1984 as an Alignment MK and chaired the Subcommittee for the Civil Guard in the West Bank, but lost his seat in 1988.

In 1978 he was a candidate in the Haifa mayoral election, finishing a distant second behind Aryeh Gur'el.

== Published works ==
- Stormy Skies - Jews and Arabs in Israel (1999)
