= Hassan Bey Shukri =

- حسن بك شكري
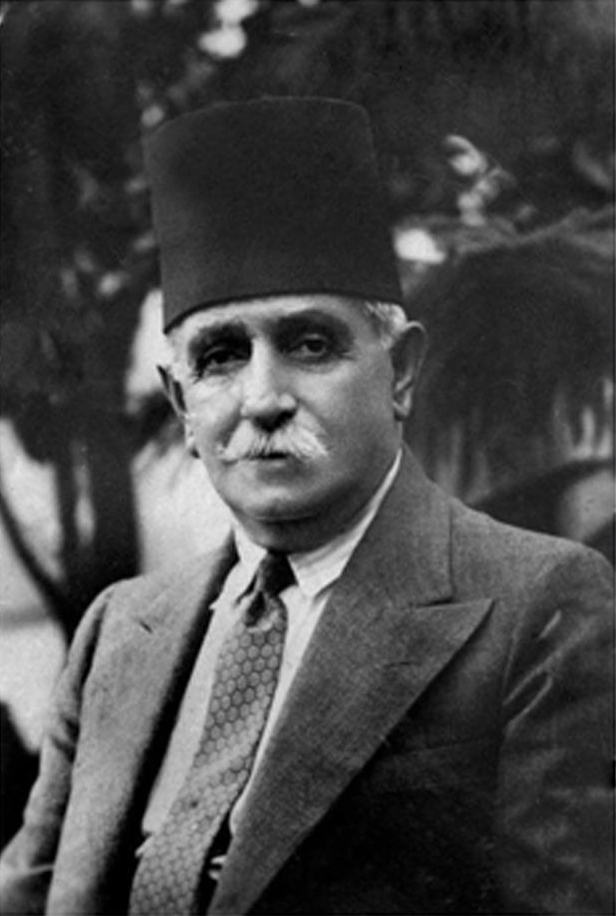
- Hassan Bey Shukri

Mayor of Haifa
- In office 1914–1920
- Preceded by: Ibrahim al-Khalil
- Succeeded by: Abd al-Rahman al-Haj
- In office 1927–1940
- Preceded by: Abd al-Rahman al-Haj
- Succeeded by: Shabtai Levy

Personal details
- Born: 1876 Jerusalem, Ottoman Empire
- Died: January 29, 1940 (aged 63–64)
- Profession: Politician
- Known for: Supporting Zionist immigration to British Mandate Palestine, advancing coexistence between Jewish and Arab communities

Hassan Bey Shukri (Arabic: حسن بك شكري; 1876–1940) was a mayor of Haifa and president of the Muslim National Associations.

== Biography ==
Hassan Shukri was born in Jerusalem and moved to Haifa as a child. The Turks appointed him mayor of the city in 1914.

In 1914, as the military governor of Jaffa, Shukri issued a directive ordering Jewish workers at a Tel Aviv flour mill to work on Shabbat despite their religious beliefs. The workers’ refusal and Shukri’s subsequent punishment of the owner of the flour mill, Eliyahu Golomb, with "falakas" (whipping) is well known as being a catalyst for Golomb’s formation of the first organised Jewish self defense organisation in Ottoman Palestine, the Haganah.

In July 1921, Shukri sent a telegram to the British government, declaring support for the Balfour Declaration and Zionist immigration to British Mandate Palestine:

We strongly protest against the attitude of the said delegation concerning the Zionist question. We do not consider the Jewish people as an enemy whose wish is to crush us. On the contrary. We consider the Jews as a brotherly people sharing our joys and troubles and helping us in the construction of our common country. We are certain that without Jewish immigration and financial assistance there will be no future development of our country as may be judged from the fact that the towns inhabited in part by Jews such as Jerusalem, Jaffa, Haifa, and Tiberias are making steady progress while Nablus, Acre, and Nazareth where no Jews reside are steadily declining.

In 1927, Shukri was reelected as mayor of Haifa with Jewish support. Shukri added Hebrew to municipal documents, which were formerly in Arabic. In 1933, he opened up city tenders to Jewish contractors.

In 1936, explosives were planted at his home, possibly in retaliation for his conciliatory attitude towards the Jews. He escaped without injury, but several months later an Arab fired four shots at Shukri as he entered Haifa City Hall. While the assassination attempt failed, Shukri was shaken and fled to Beirut. When Shukri died on January 29, 1940, many of Haifa’s Jewish leaders attended his funeral.
