= Yehudit Naot =

Israeli scientist and politician

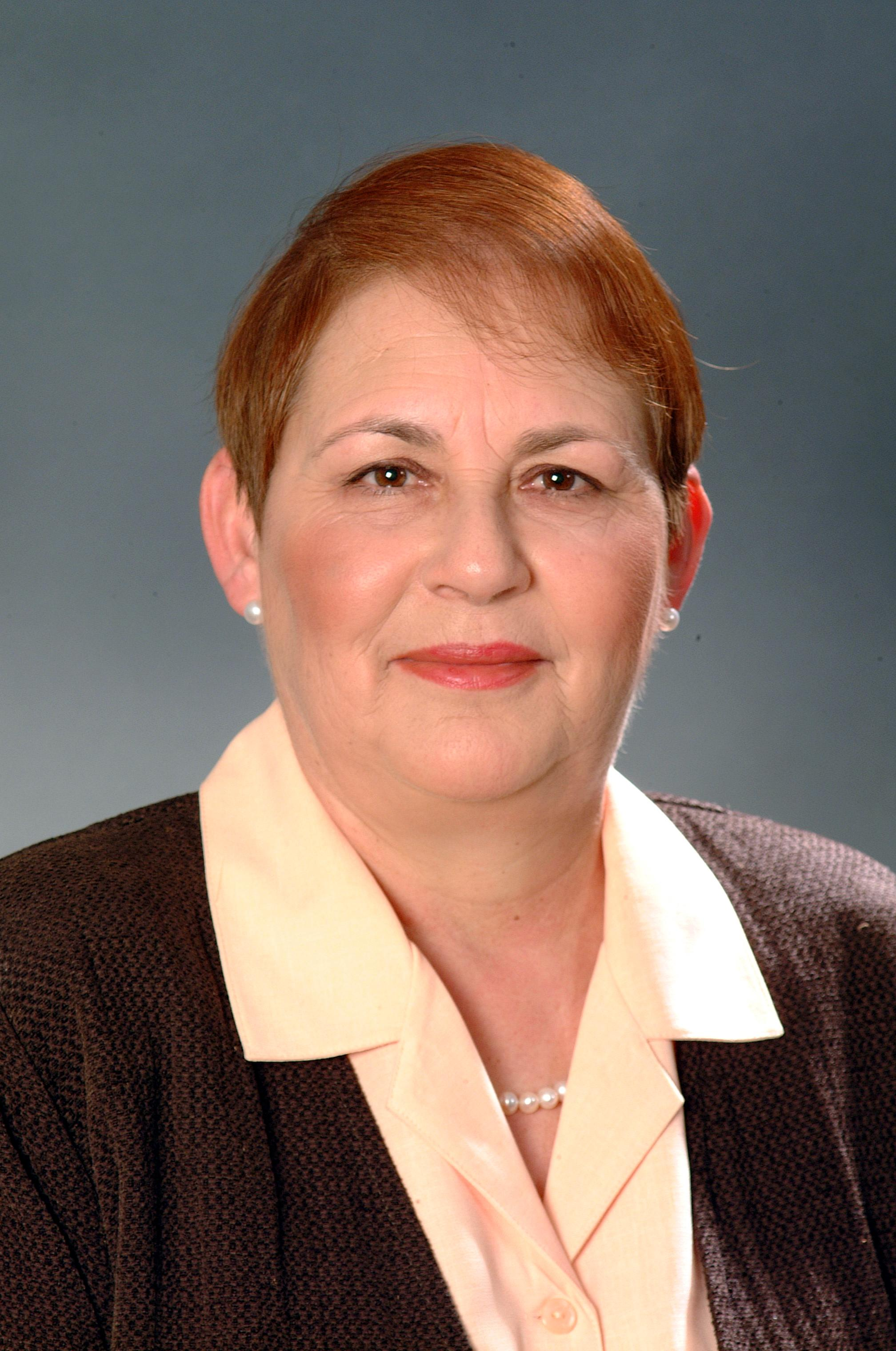
- Naot in 2003

Ministerial roles
- 2003–2004: Minister of the Environment

Faction represented in the Knesset
- 1999–2004: Shinui

Personal details
- Born: 4 April 1944 Kiryat Haim, Mandatory Palestine
- Died: 16 December 2004 (aged 60) Haifa, Israel

Professor Yehudit Naot (Hebrew: יהודית נאות; 4 April 1944 – 16 December 2004) was an Israeli scientist and politician. She served as Minister of the Environment between February 2003 and October 2004.

== Biography ==
Born in Kiryat Haim during the Mandate era, Naot gained a BSc in chemistry and a PhD in biology from the Technion. She went on to work in the medical department at the university, and became a professor.

In 1975 she was amongst the founders of Shinui. She was elected to Haifa's local council in 1978, though she left it in 1979. She returned to the council several times, serving from 1983 to 1987, from 1989 to 1993, and from 1993 to 1997. She ran in the 1983 Haifa mayoral election, placing third with 6.68% of the vote. She ran for the mayoralty again in 1989, finishing third with 13% of the vote. She subsequently served as the city's deputy mayor from 1989 and 1991. After losing in the 1993 mayoral election (finishing last in a field of five candidates with 4% of the vote), she served as deputy mayor again from 1993 until 1996.

In 1999 she was elected to the Knesset as the third-placed candidate on Shinui's list, and became a Deputy Speaker of the Knesset. After retaining her seat in the 2003 elections, she was appointed Minister of the Environment in Ariel Sharon's government. She resigned from the cabinet in October 2004 due to deteriorating health, but continued to serve as an MK until her death in December that year. She died from throat cancer, linked to her smoking.

Naot was married and had three children.
