= Aliza Shenhar =

Israeli diplomat

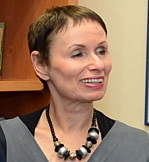
Shenhar in 2013

Aliza Shenhar (Hebrew: עליזה שנהר) is a professor, author and was President of Emek Yezreel College who served as Israel's ambassador to Russia (1994–1997) and deputy mayor of Haifa.

== Biography ==
Shenhar was born in Rosh Pina where her father worked as a laborer. The family moved to Haifa when she was four years old. She attended Hebrew University of Jerusalem and majored in popular literature. In 1991, she became the University of Haifa's first female Rector as well as the first female to hold that position in Israel. In 1991 she "headed the Shenhar Committee, which examined Jewish education in Israeli public schools."

In 2003, she was the Israeli Labor Party nominee for mayor of Haifa. However, facing a lack of support, she withdrew three days before the election and endorsed Yona Yahav.

== Publications ==
- Loved and Hated: Women in the Bible, Midrash and Modern Hebrew Literature
