= Walls of Jaffa =

Walls which surrounded Jaffa in the 19th century

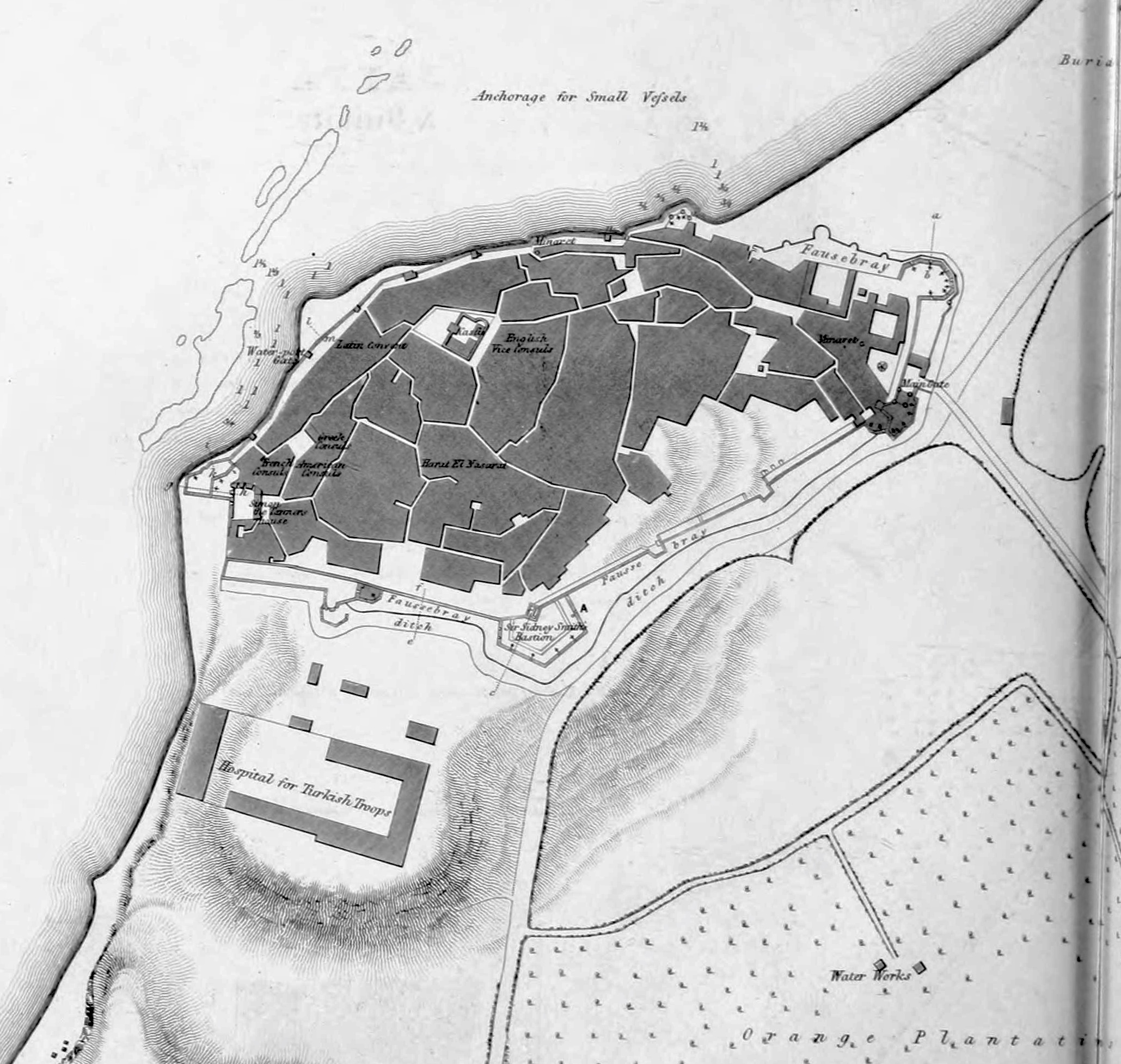
Map depicting Jaffa enclosed by its wall, dating back to 1840–41

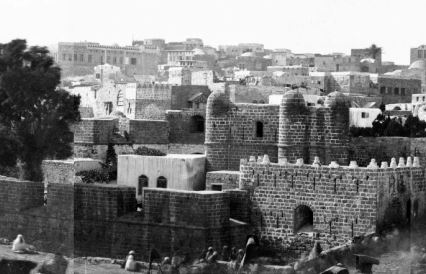
Jerusalem gate in the wall of Jaffa, with the fort behind it

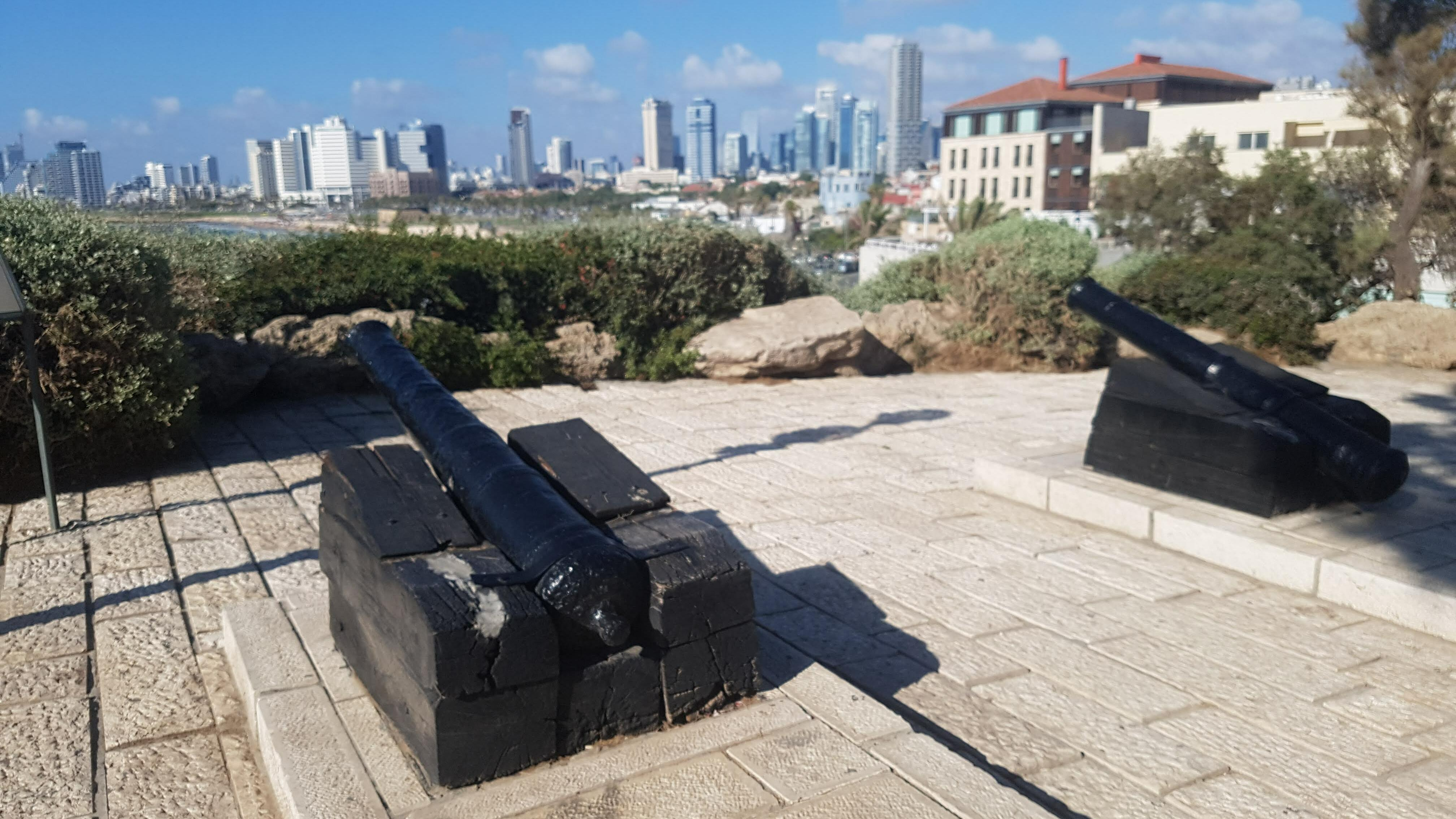
Ottoman cannons, positioned outside the walls of Jaffa to safeguard against Bedouin raids and pirate attacks from the sea

The walls of Jaffa (Hebrew: חומות יפו) are the walls that surrounded Old Jaffa during the Ottoman period in Israel from the beginning of the 19th century until its dismantling around 1879.

== History ==
Archaeological excavations in Jaffa have uncovered walls, used for fortifications dating back to the Byzantine, early Islamic, Crusader, and Mamluk periods.

In the 10th century, Al-Muqaddasi described Jaffa as a small town, protected by a strong wall with iron gates. Constantin de Volney, the French politician and orientalist, who visited Jaffa on his journey to the east, reported it had walls twelve to fourteen feet high and three to five feet wide. These walls were breached by Napoleon in 1799. Following the appointment of Muhammad Abu Nabbut as the Turkish governor of Jaffa by Sultan Sulayman Pasha, a western wall was constructed along the sea, encircling the city. Simultaneously, an eastern wall was also erected, featuring a singular gate known as the "Jerusalem Gate." This gate served as the starting point for the main road to Jerusalem. Behind it, the Sidney Smith Fort, was built in 1800 with the help of British engineers and funding, and named after the British admiral who helped in the battle against Napoleon's invasion. A ditch was dug along to the eastern wall facing the land, (now near the Clock Square and Yefet Street).

In the late 1860s, additional gates were opened in the eastern wall to ease traffic flow. Such alterations would have been unlikely while the walls served as the city's primary defense. However, stable political conditions and advancements in artillery rendered their defensive significance obsolete by that time. Subsequently, the old city wall began to be dismantled. Houses and shops were constructed alongside its path, utilizing the wall stones as building material.

== Remains of the wall ==
Today, remnants of the wall can be seen in the eastern part of Yefet Street in the section between the Clock Square and Louis Pasteur Street. There are several covered alleyways, such as Rivka and Shlomo Abulafia Streets, which once served as pedestrian shortcuts through the wall.

== Gallery ==
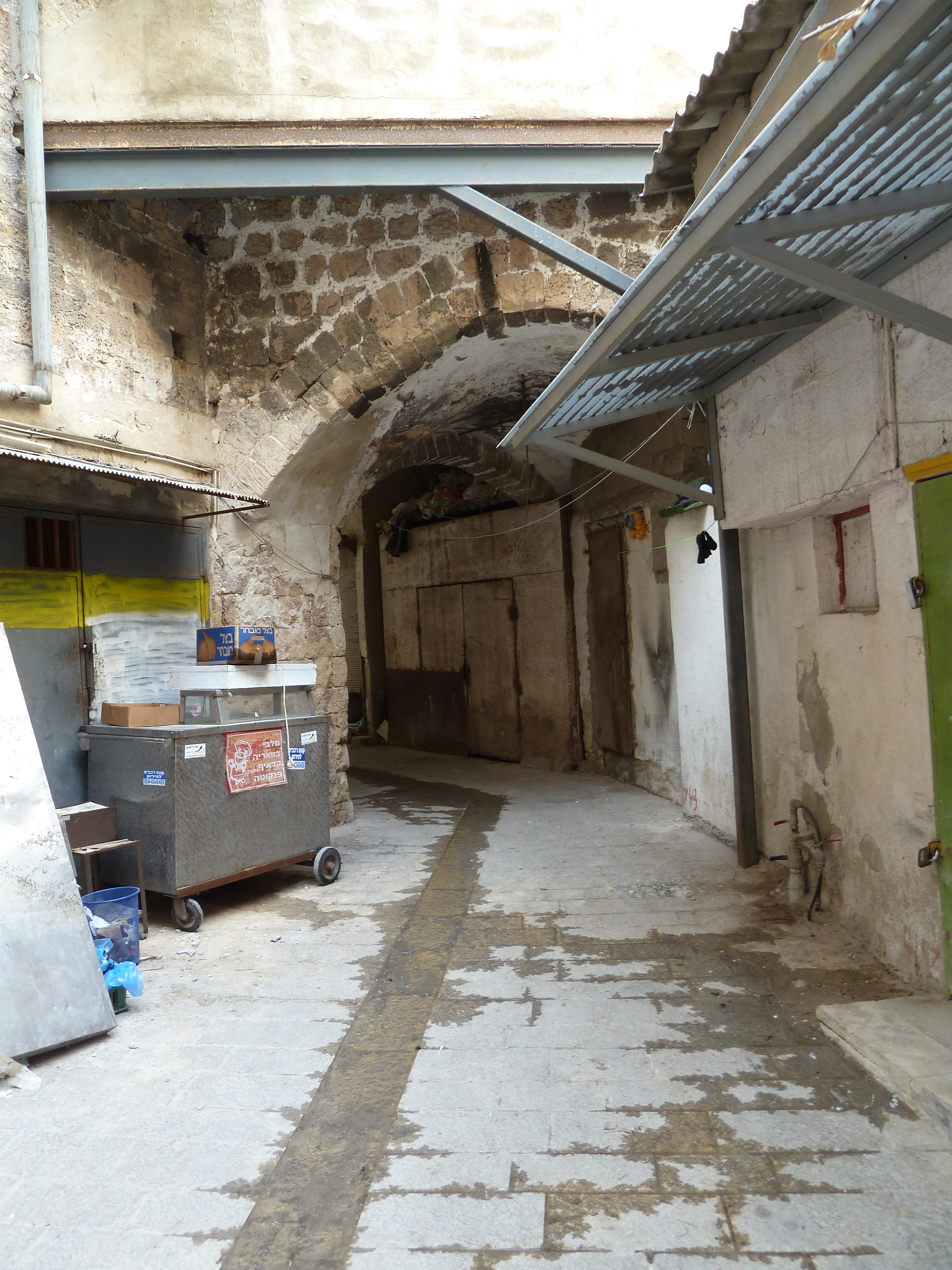
A remain of the wall of Jaffa near the Flea Market

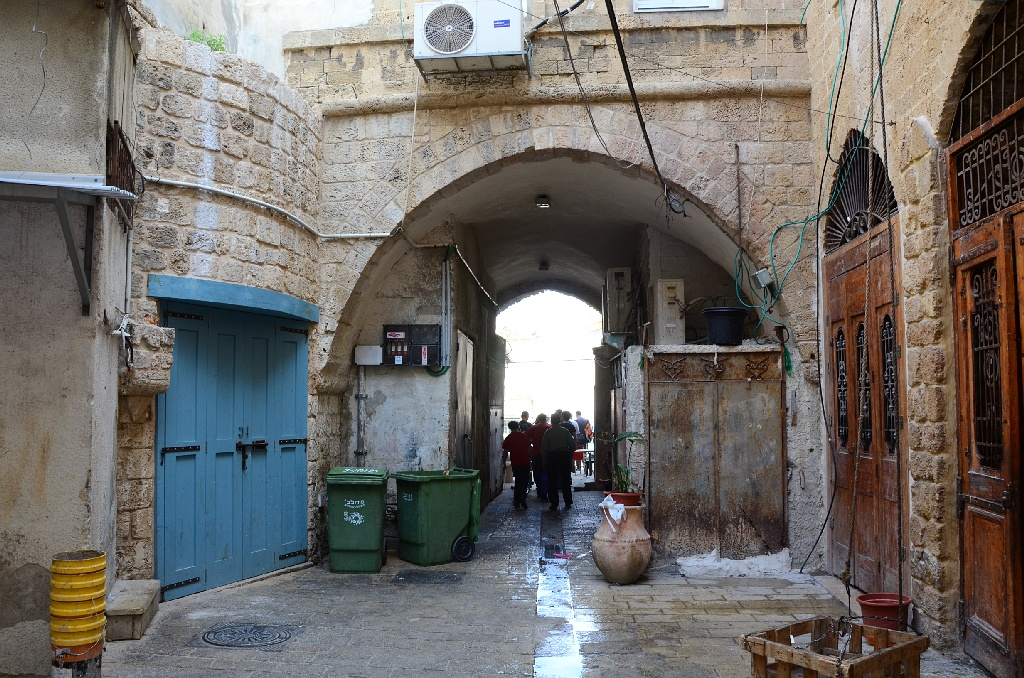
Covered alleyway, once a narrow opening in the wall used by pedestrians. Now Rivka and Shlomo Abulafia Streets

== See also ==
- Abattoir Hill
- Jaffa port
- Timeline of Jaffa
- Walls of Jerusalem
