= Giora Fisher =

Israeli politician

- גיורא פישר

Mayor of Haifa
- In office 2003–2003
- Preceded by: Amram Mitzna
- Succeeded by: Yona Yahav

Personal details
- Born: 1937
- Died: 15 October 2014 (aged 76–77)
- Party: Israeli Labor Party

Giora Fisher (Hebrew: גיורא פישר') was the Mayor of Haifa from 2003 to 2003.

He was a member of the Israeli Labor Party.

Fisher died on 15 October 2014. A funeral was held on 17 October at Tel Regev Cemetery.

Giora Fisher Square in the Kiryat Haim neighbourhood of Haifa is named after him.
