= Shabtai Levy =

Jewish mayor of Haifa

- שבתי לוי
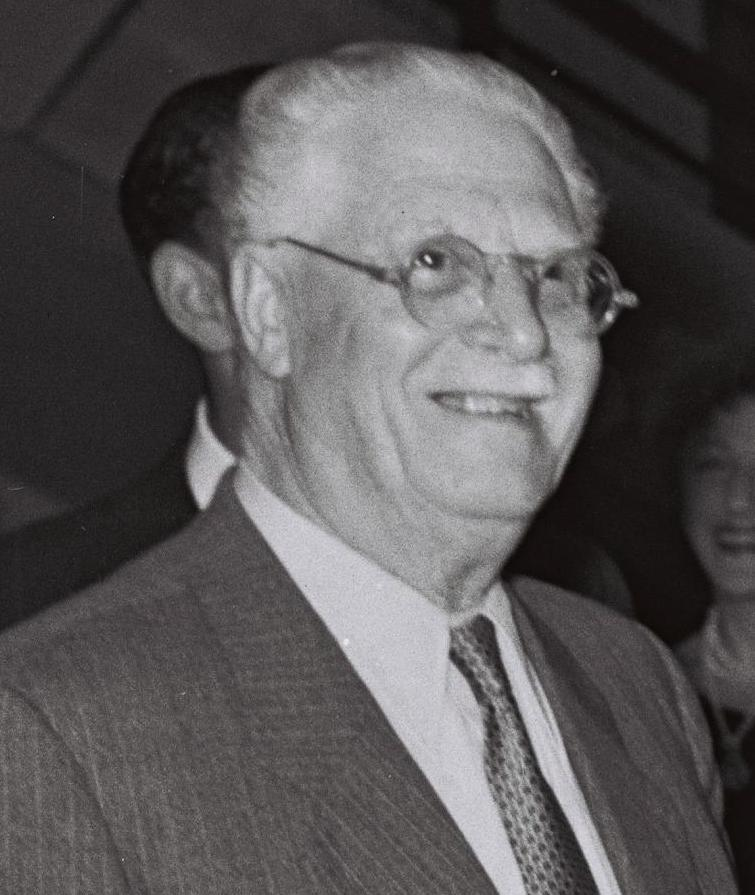

1st Mayor of Haifa
- In office 1940–1951
- Preceded by: Hassan Bey Shukri
- Succeeded by: Abba Hushi

Personal details
- Born: 10 April 1876 Istanbul, Ottoman Empire
- Died: 1 November 1956 (aged 80) Haifa, Israel
- Political party: Independent

Shabtai Levy (Hebrew: שבתי לוי; 1876–1956) was the first Jewish mayor of Haifa. He held office from 1941 to 1951.

== Biography ==
Shabtai Levy was born in Istanbul, Ottoman Empire in 1876. Trained as a lawyer, he made Aliyah in 1894. He studied in the Palestine Jewish Colonization Association (PJCA) school in Petah Tikva. He was then employed as a clerk for the Baron Edmond James de Rothschild. In 1905 he moved to Haifa and managed the law and land departments of the PJCA and Jewish Colonization Association. Levi was one of the founders of the Herzliya neighborhood in Haifa in 1907.

== Public office ==
When the British established a Haifa city council in 1920, Levy was appointed along with Raphael Hakim. In 1924, Levy was elected along with David HaCohen as an independent. Starting in 1934, he served as vice-mayor of Haifa. In 1941, when Hassan Bey Shukri died, Levy became the acting mayor of Haifa, and the city's first Jewish mayor. During the 1948 Palestinian expulsion and flight, he tried to use his influence to try to keep the Arab population from leaving the city.

== Legacy ==
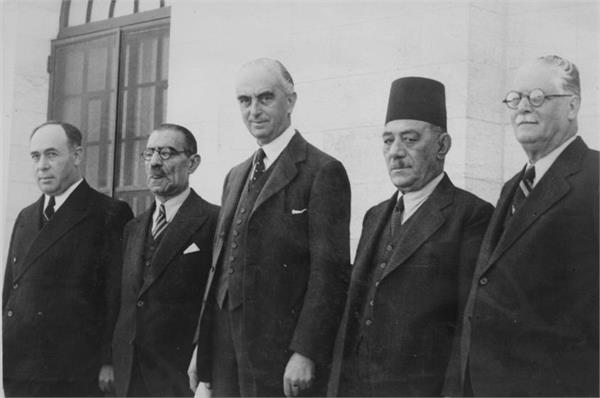
High Commissioner Harold MacMichael with Palestinian Mayors 1942: from left - Israel Rokach (Tel Aviv), Mustafa al-Khalidi (Jerusalem), MacMichael, Omar Effendi al Bitar (Jaffa), Shabtai Levy (Haifa)

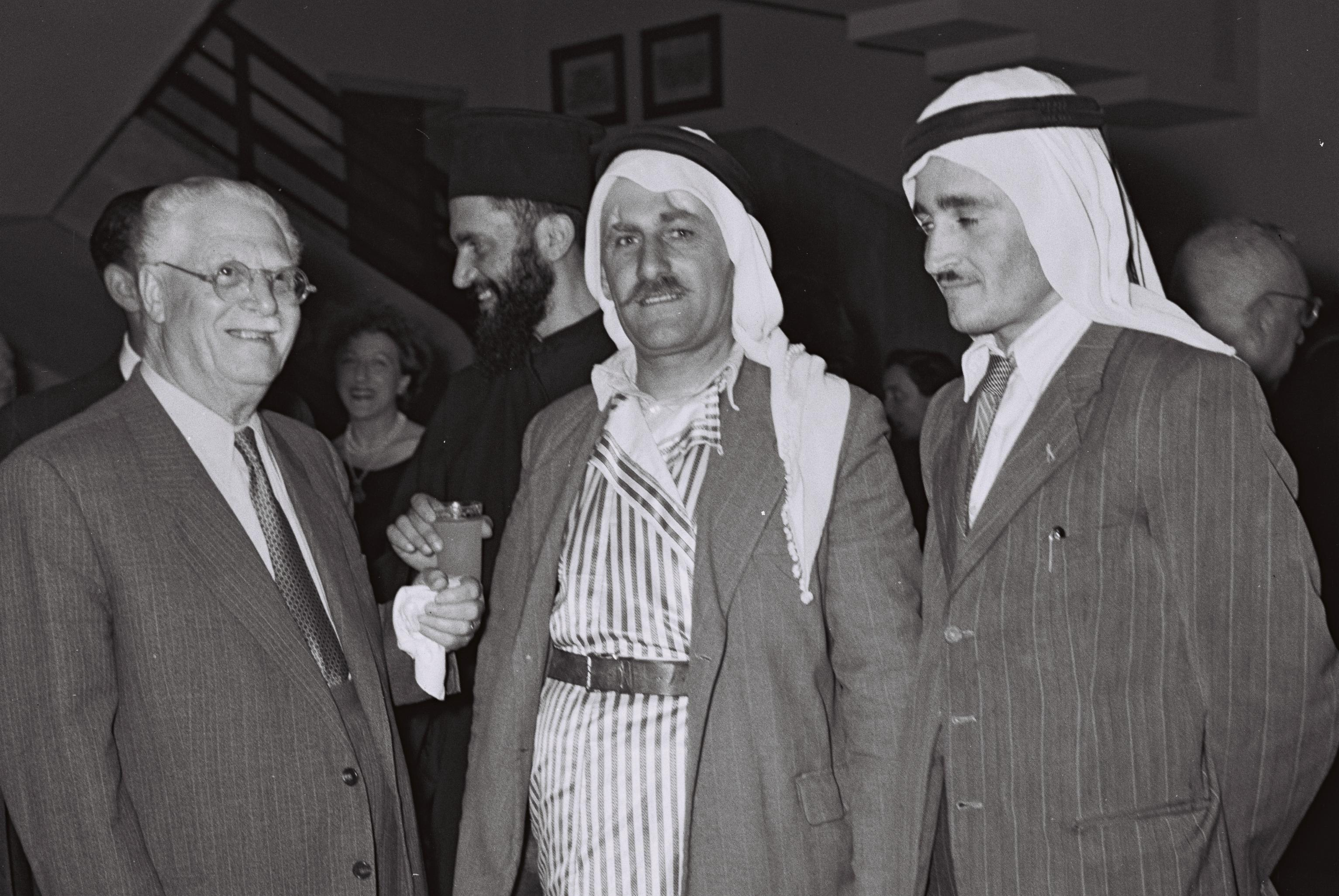
Shabtai Levy receiving Arab guests, 1950 Independence Day celebrations

In the 1940s the Shabtai Levy Home was established in Haifa, providing a wide range of services to undepriviledged children of all faiths. When it was founded, The Shabtai Levy Day Care Center served the families of soldiers in the Volunteer Jewish Brigade during World War II. Over the intervening years, services have expanded to include a recuperation center for sick babies which later became a residential home for babies and toddlers, an Emergency Center specializing in the emergency care of babies and very young children, and a Satellite Foster Families Program. There was also the addition of a mother-baby residential facility to rehabilitate mother-child pairs, to enhance mothering skills and bonding. The "Shalom Hayeled" Ambulatory Unit provides out-patient treatment for at-risk and abused children from the entire Northern District of Israel.

Preceded by Hassan Bey Shukri	Mayor of Haifa; 1941–1951	Succeeded by Abba Hushi
