= Mayoral elections in Haifa =

Elections are held in Haifa to elect the city's mayor. Currently, such elections are regularly scheduled to elect mayors to five-year terms.

Prior to 1978, mayors were selected by a vote of the city council. Since 1978, direct elections have been held for mayor.

== 1978 ==
The 1978 Haifa mayoral election was held on 7 November 1978, and saw the election Aryeh Gur'el.

1978 Haifa mayoral election results
Candidate	Party	Votes	%
Aryeh Gur'el	Labor	46,450	50.66
Amnon Linn		23,060	25.15
Zvi Zimmerman		15,771	17.20
Moshe Rofe		6,407	6.99
Total		91,688	100

== 1983 ==
The 1983 Haifa mayoral election was held on 25 October 1983, and saw the reelection Aryeh Gur'el.

Gur'el's strongest opponent was Yael Rom, a pioneering female pilot in the Israeli Air Force. While she was a member of Likud, Rom ran for mayor in affiliation with an independent party list that was running in the coinciding city council elections.

1983 Haifa mayoral election results
Candidate	Party	Votes	%
Aryeh Gur'el (incumbent)	Labor	58,521	63.36
Yael Rom		16,342	17.69
Yom Tov Elkayam		8,162	8.84
Yehudit Naot	Shinui	6,166	6.68
Nahum Menachem		3,169	3.43
Total		92,360	100

== 1989 ==
The 1989 Haifa mayoral election was held on 28 February 1989, and saw the reelection Aryeh Gur'el to a third consecutive term.

1989 Haifa mayoral election results
Candidate	Party	Votes	%
Aryeh Gur'el (incumbent)	Labor	42,217	42.31
Rami Dotan	Likud	38,292	38.38
Yehudit Naot	Shinui	12,917	12.94
Pinhas Narkis		4,154	4.16
Shlom Azulay		2,203	2.21
Total		99,783	100

== 1993 ==
The 1993 Haifa mayoral election was held on 2 November 1993, and saw the election of Amram Mitzna.

=== Labor Party primary ===
In the primary election for the Israeli Labor Party nomination, third-term incumbent mayor Aryeh Gur'el was defeated by challenger Amram Mitzna.

Mitzna won 63% of the vote to Gur'el's 37% in the primary, held on May 18, 1993. The primary campaign between the two had been tense.

After losing the primary, Gur'el announced that he would consider running in the general election as an independent candidate.

=== General election ===
Since Haifa was considered a stronghold of the Labor Party, Mitzna entered the general election as its front-runner.

1993 Haifa mayoral election results
Candidate	Party	Votes	%
Amram Mitzna	Labor	50,269	58.66
Narkis Pinchas		14,249	16.63
Avraham Golhand		10,996	12.83
Moses Statman		6,730	7.85
Yehudit Naot		3,456	4.03
Total		85,700	100

== 1998 ==
The 1998 Haifa mayoral election was held on 10 November 1998, and saw the reelection Amram Mitzna.

1998 Haifa mayoral election results
Candidate	Party	Votes	%
Amram Mitzna (incumbent)	Labor	56,912	64.07
Ed Amom		13,985	15.74
Shmuel Gelbart		9,242	10.40
Rami Levy		6,502	7.32
Shlomo Atari		1,492	1.68
Pinhas Narkis		697	0.79
Total		88,830	100

== 2003 ==
The 2003 Haifa mayoral election was held on 28 October 2003 to elect the mayor of Haifa. It saw the election of Yona Yahav.

The election marked the first time that the Israeli Labor Party lost control of Haifa's mayoralty, as it and its predecessors had run the city since the 1940s. Haifa had been considered the party's most consistent stronghold. Labor was without a candidate, after their nominee, Aliza Shenhar, having poor support, dropped-out of the race three days before the election and endorsed Yahav. Yahav, who had formerly been a Labor member of the Knesset, ran a campaign affiliated with Shinui-Greens-Neighborhoods Union, which also ran a party list in the city council. Yahav had originally pursued Labor's nomination.

Likud nominee, retired general Shmuel Arad, had been considered the front-runner of the election. Arad received a greater vote share than any previous Likud mayoral candidate had ever received in Haifa. He had been expected to perform strongly in the city after Labor had Likud placed first in the city in the preceding 2003 Israeli legislative election, the first time in its history that the party had done so.

2003 Haifa mayoral election results
Candidate	Votes	%
Yona Yahav	41,644	51.88%
Shmuel Arad	34,412	42.87%
Shimon Ohayon	1,217	1.55%
Total	77,237	100

== 2008 ==
The 2008 Haifa mayoral election was held on 11 November 2008 to elect the mayor of Haifa. It saw the reelection of Yona Yahav.

It was part of the 2008 Israeli municipal elections. Yahav defeated challenger Ya'acov Borovsky.

2008 Haifa mayoral election results
Candidate	Votes	%
Yona Yahav (incumbent)	42,192	47.1%
Ya'acov Borovsky	33,251	37.1%
Israel Ya'akov Savyon	3,623	4.0%
Rami Levy	3,259	3.6%
Walid Hamis	2,811	3.1%
Shmuel Glabhart	2,685	3.0%
Boris Lazarav	1,786	2.0%
Total	89,607	100

== 2013 ==
The 2013 Haifa mayoral election was held on 22 October 2013 to elect the mayor of Haifa. It saw the reelection of Yona Yahav to a third consecutive term.

It was part of the 2013 Israeli municipal elections.

The city saw turnout exceeding 40%.

2013 Haifa mayoral election results
Candidate	Votes	%
Yona Yahav (incumbent)	40,077	49.01%
Yaakov Borowski	24,214	29.61%
Einat Kalisch-Rotem	11,607	14.19%
Itay Glboa	4,509	5.51%
Zeev Silas	1,374	1.68%
Total	81,781	100

== 2018 ==
The 2018 Haifa mayoral election was held on 30 October 2018 to elect the mayor of Haifa. It saw the election of Einat Kalisch-Rotem, who unseated incumbent mayor Yona Yahav. Kalisch-Rotem would become the first female mayor of Haifa, making Haifa the largest city in Israel, and first major Israeli city, to ever have a female mayor.

The election was part of the 2018 Israeli municipal elections.

=== Candidates ===
- Avihu Han (Haifa Greens)
- Einat Kalisch-Rotem (Living in Haifa), city council member, urban planner, teacher and 2013 mayoral candidate
- Mendi Salzmann (Haifa Awakens)
- Israel Ya'akov Savyon (Lovers of Haifa)
- Yona Yahav (Yona Yahav and Haifa's Youth), incumbent mayor since 2013

=== Results ===
Candidate	Party name		Votes	%
Einat Kalisch-Rotem	Living in Haifa	חיים בחיפה, Haim BeHeifa	66,486	56.21%
Yona Yahav (incumbent)	Yona Yahav and Haifa's Youth	יונה יהב וצעירי חיפה, Yona Yahav VeTze'irei Heifa	43,907	37.12%
Avihu Han	Haifa Greens	הירוקים של חיפה, HaYerukim Shel Heifa	3,787	3.20%
Mendi Salzmann	Haifa Awakens	חיפה מתעוררת, Heifa Mit'oreret	2,585	2.19%
Israel Ya'akov Savyon	Lovers of Haifa	אוהבי חיפה, Ohavei Heifa	1,506	1.27%
Source: Ministry of the Interior

== 2024 ==
The 2024 Haifa mayoral election was held 27 February 2024 to elect the mayor of Haifa. Originally scheduled for 31 October 2023, the elections were delayed due to the Gaza war. Former mayor Yona Yahav won the mayoral election in February 2024 by defeating David Etzioni, winning over 62% of the vote in the second round.

Candidate	Party	First round		Second round	
Candidate	Party	Votes	%	Votes	%
Yona Yahav	Our Haifa	40,677	35.98	57,323	62.58
David Etzioni	Our Home	24,864	21.99	34,281	37.42
Ya'akov Borovski	Connected to Haifa and Kiryat Hayim	13,242	11.71		
Avihu Han	The Greens - Blue and White	10,725	9.49		
Sarit Golan-Steinberg	Haifa for us - New Deal	5,178	4.58		
Einat Kalisch-Rotem	Living in Haifa	5,094	4.51		
Kirill Karetnik	Ani Hai-Po	4,934	4.36		
Zvika Barabi	I Care about the Residents of Haifa	2,576	2.28		
Yossi Yosef Shalom	Yesh Atid and Haifa's Youth	2,061	1.82		
Ibrahim Ghatas	For Our Children	1,805	1.60		
Lazar Kaplon	Da Haifa	1,510	1.34		
Ishak Balas	Haifans Together Win Together	382	0.34		
Total		113,048	100.00	91,604	100.00
Valid votes		113,048	96.32	91,604	99.09
Invalid/blank votes		4,317	3.68	845	0.91
Total votes		117,365	100.00	92,449	100.00
Registered voters/turnout		268,342	43.74	268,342	34.45
Source: Reshumot, Municipality of Haifa
