= Mayor of Haifa =

Head of the executive branch of the government of Haifa

- Coat of arms of Haifa

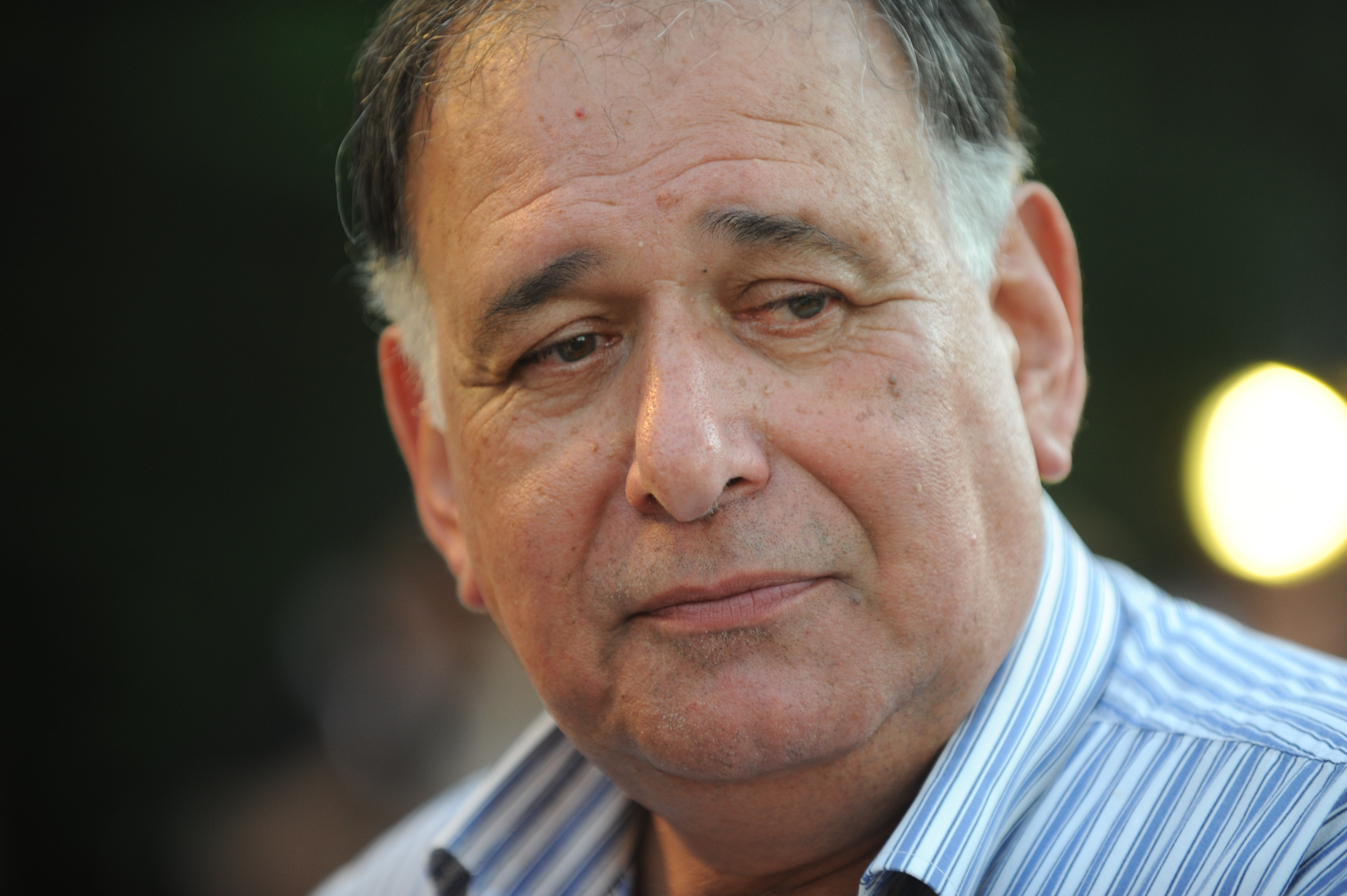
- Incumbent; Yona Yahav since 2024
- Term length: 5 years

The Mayor of Haifa is the head of the executive branch of the political system in Haifa. The mayor's office administers all city services, public property, most public agencies, and enforces city and state laws. The term of office is five years.

== List of mayors ==
=== Ottoman Empire (1775–1920) ===
	Mayor	Took office	Left office
1	Najib Effendi al-Yasin	1873	1877
2	Ahmad Effendi Jalabi	1878	1881
3	Mustafa Bey al-Salih	1881	1883
4	Mustafa Pasha al-Khalil	1885	1903
5	Jamil Sadiq	1904	1910
6	Rif'at al-Salah	1910	1911
7	Ibrahim al-Khalil	1911	1913
8	Hassan Bey Shukri	1914	1920

=== Mandatory Palestine (1920–1948) ===
	Mayor	Took office	Left office
1	Abd al-Rahman al-Haj	1920	1927
2	Hassan Bey Shukri	1927	1940
3	Shabtai Levy	1940	1948

=== Israel (from 1948) ===
	Mayor	Took office	Left office	Party	Coalition
1	Shabtai Levy	1948	1951	Independent	
2	Abba Hushi	1951	1969	Mapai	
3	Moshe Flimann	1969	1973	Independent	
4	Yosef Almogi	1974	1975	Alignment	
5	Yeruham Zeisel	1975	1978	Independent	
6	Aryeh Gur'el	1978	1993	Israeli Labor Party	
7	Amram Mitzna	1993	2003	Israeli Labor Party	
-	Giora Fisher	2003	2003		
8	Yona Yahav	29 October 2003	28 November 2018	Israeli Labor Party	
9	Einat Kalisch-Rotem	28 November 2018	31 March 2024	Israeli Labor Party	
10	Yona Yahav	31 March 2024	Incumbent	Israeli Labor Party	

== See also ==
- Mayoral elections in Haifa
- Mayor of Tel Aviv
- Mayor of Jerusalem
