= Moshe Flimann =

Israeli politician, mayor of Haifa

- משה פלימן
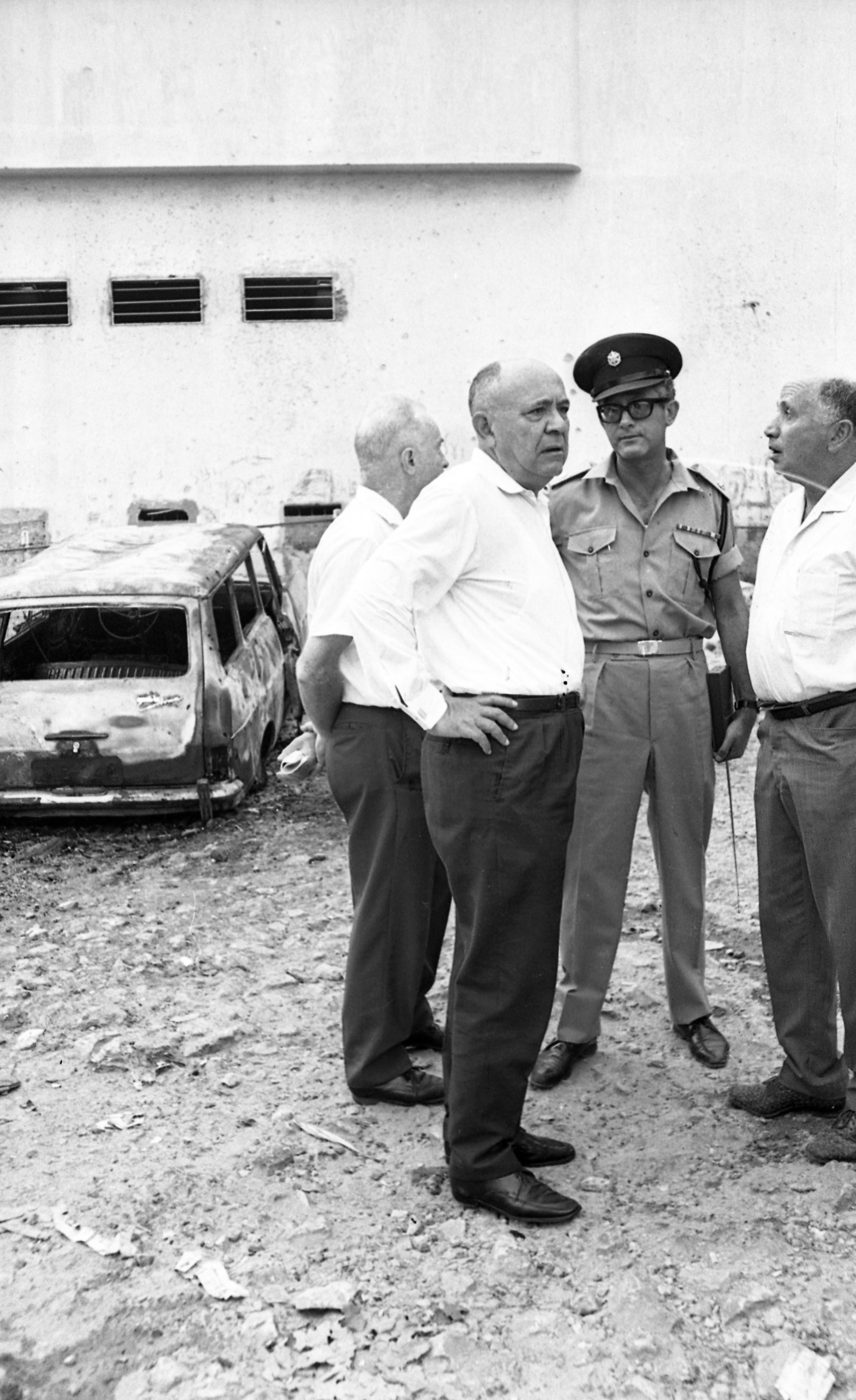

3rd Mayor of Haifa
- In office 1969–1973
- Preceded by: Abba Hushi
- Succeeded by: Yosef Almogi

Personal details
- Born: 20 July 1905 Stanyslaviv, Galicia, Austria-Hungary
- Died: 25 May 1973 (aged 67) Israel

Moshe Flimann (Hebrew: משה פלימן; 1905–1973) served as the mayor of Haifa, from 1969 to 1973.

Flimann was born in 1905 in Ivano-Frankivsk (Stanyslaviv), in Austrian Galicia (present-day Ukraine). He was a member of a Zionist youth movement, and joined the "Pioneer" movement. He was imprisoned by the Russian authorities because of his Zionist activities, but was released a short time after his arrest.

After completing high school, he went to Moscow to study electrical engineering. In 1929 he was imprisoned because of his continued participation in Zionist organizations, and was sent to Siberia to serve a three-year sentence. However, in 1930, his sentence was shortened; he was banished from the U.S.S.R. and then emigrated to Palestine.

After emigrating to Palestine, he worked in the "Stein" factory in Yafo, and subsequently as an electrician, until he found work as a teacher of physics and math in Tel Aviv. He only taught for a short time, however, as he soon began working as an electrician in a quarry in Atlit. In 1932, he was accepted to work for the Israel Electric Corporation. By 1957, he had been promoted to the manager of the national grid, and was elected to the board of the company as a representative of the workers.

Flimann lived in Kiryat Haim, and was a member of the city council there. After Kiryat Haim became part of the city of Haifa, he became a member of the Haifa municipal council. In 1959 he was elected deputy mayor. In 1959, after the death of his predecessor Abba Hushi, he became mayor and served in this office from 1969 until 1973.

During his tenure, the Israeli National Maritime Museum in Haifa was established. Also during his time in office, the Dan and Nof hotels in Mercaz Ha-Carmel were established. Likewise, the building of the Haifa nursing hospital began during his tenure, and upon its completion, which was after his death, it was named after him.

City School Number Five in Haifa is also named after Flimann.

Preceded by Abba Hushi	Mayor of Haifa; 1969–1973	Succeeded by Yosef Almogi
