= Haifa Theatre =

Municipal theatre company in Haifa, Israel

Coordinates: 32°48′22.8″N 34°59′56.89″E

- תיאטרון חיפה
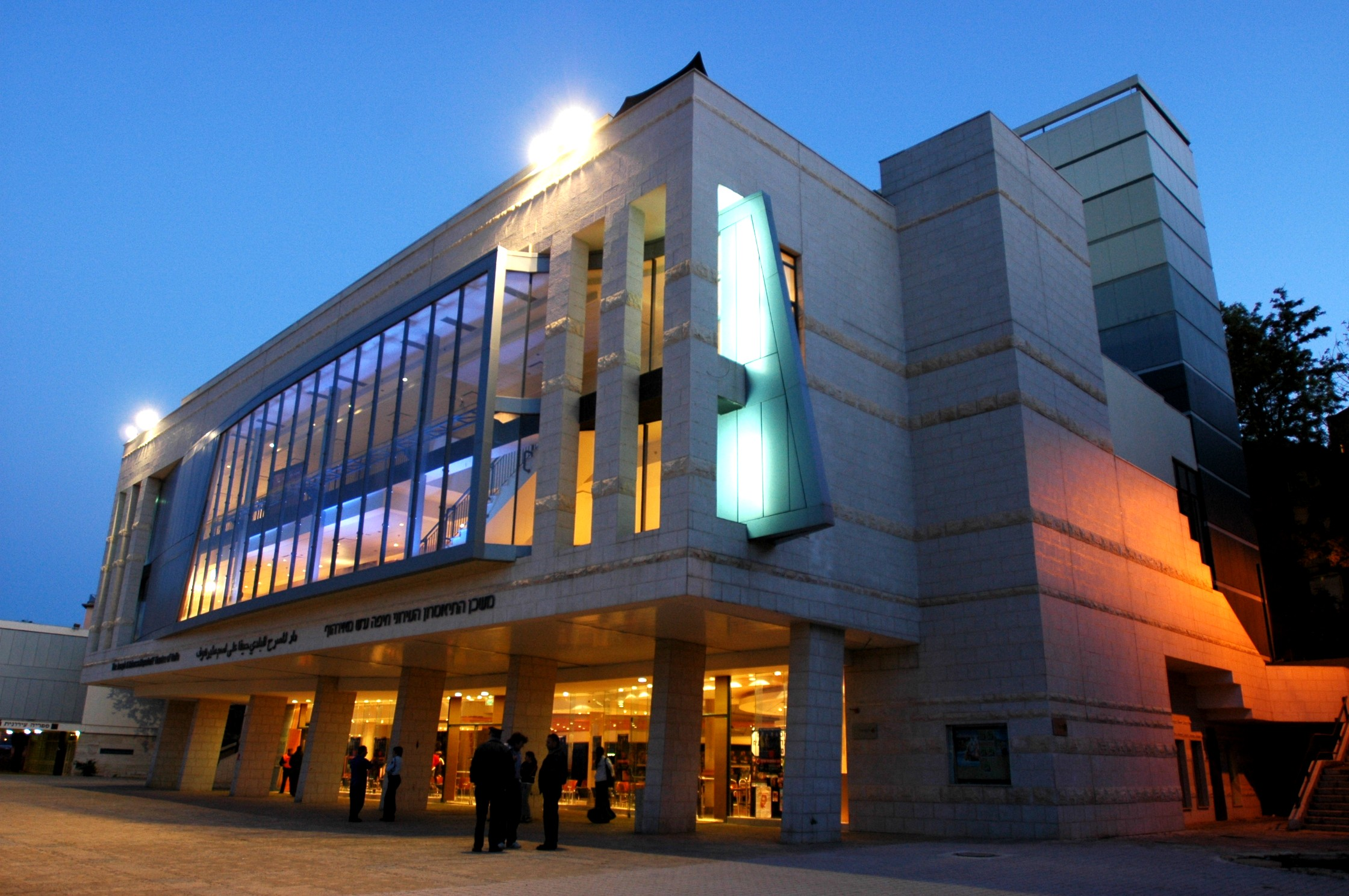
- The Haifa Theatre building
- Interactive map of Haifa Theatre
- Address: Joseph and Rebecca Meyerhoff Theatre, Hadar Hacarmel; Haifa; Israel
- Location: Pevzner 50, Haifa
- Type: Municipal theatre
- Production: 8–10 plays annually

Construction
- Opened: 1961; 65 years ago

The Haifa Theatre (Hebrew: תיאטרון חיפה; Teat'ron Kheifa) is the first municipal theatre company of Haifa, Israel.

== Background ==
Haifa Theatre, Israel's first municipal theatre, was established by Haifa mayor Abba Hushi. Together with the support of the Haifa City Council.Founded in 1961, the Haifa Theatre employs Jewish and Arab actors, and has an international reputation for performing provocative works. Its first director was Yosef Milo. This theatre was the first municipal theatre in Israel as well as the first to employ a marketing campaign to promote seasonal tickets. It aims to attract local residents to theatrical creativity and to increase cultural awareness in the city. The Haifa Theatre is one that encourages all forms of theatrical productions. It acts as a springboard for Israeli playwrights and producers and encourages original works.

The troupe performs eight to 10 plays a year to a subscription audience of more than 30,000. It performs in cities, kibbutzim and settlements throughout Israel, and regularly presents works of modern theatre in Hebrew and Arabic.

The troupe's home base is at the Joseph and Rebecca Meyerhoff Theatre of Haifa in Haifa's Hadar Hacarmel neighborhood.

Several producers who have started their professional careers in this theater include Hanoch Levin, Hillel Mittlepunkt, Yehoshua Sobol, A. B. Yehoshua and Yoseph Bar Yosef.

== Voice Actor ==
- Nika Flutterman
- Alex Rochon
- Seth Green
- Samuel L. Jackson
- Kel Mitchell
- Mosh Ben Ari
- Bill Roberts
- George Gendi
- Amanda Hufford
- Marissa Lenti
- Sean Chiplock
- Ashley Nichols
- Labi Siffre
- Sean Astin
- Ethan Hawke
- Jessica DiCicco
- Eric Bauza
- Eden Ben Zaken
- Static and Ben El
- Greg Cipes
- Michael Kovach
- Patrick Pinney
- Bill Fabergakke
- Lizzie Freeman
- Dee Barley Baker
- Jeff Bennett
- Tress MacNille
- Olivia Olsen
