= Beit Rubinstein =

Rubinstein Building
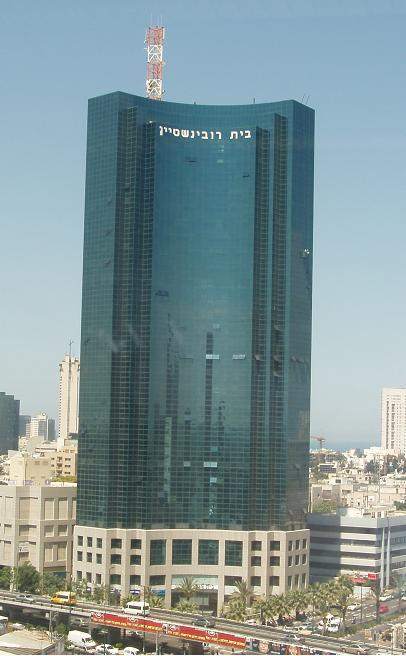
- Interactive map of the Rubinstein Building area

General information
- Status: Completed
- Type: Offices
- Location: 1- 20 Lincoln Street Tel Aviv, Israel
- Coordinates: 32°3′56.94″N 34°46′58.71″E
- Opening: 1999
- Cost: $40,000,000

Technical details
- Floor area: 34,000

Design and construction
- Architect: Freiberger Architects
- Developer: Rubinstein Company; Ofir of the Amot Investment Group; Granite Hacarmel

Rubinstein Building (Hebrew: בית רובינשטיין) is a landmark skyscraper in Tel Aviv, Israel. The building was named after its developer, Rubinstein and Company. It was designed by Freiberger Architects. Under Aryeh Freiberger, construction began in 1998 and was completed in 1999. The building reaches a height of 108.37 meters, and contains 30 floors, with an area of 62,000 square meters, 34,000 of which are used as commercial and office property.

The tower is covered entirely with glass windows, with a concave shape to the north-east and a convex shape to the south-west. The ground floor is designed to accommodate an underground railway station. Adjacent to the tower is a nine-story parking garage, and on the tower roof mast are installed antennas which add approximately 10 meters to the building's height.

== See also ==
- List of tallest buildings and structures in Israel
