= Achva, Tel Aviv =

Neighborhood in Tel-Aviv

Coordinates: 32.0603°N 34.7658°E

Achva was a Jewish neighborhood which located eastern-northern to Jaffa, established in 1899, by traditional Ashkenazi Jews. its location was in the southern area of today's Achva Street in Tel Aviv, near Suzanne Dellal Center for Dance and Theater. by the 1920s, the neighborhood has been merged with Tel Aviv Municipality.
