= Najib Effendi al-Yasin =

Haifa mayor under the Othman empire

Najib Effendi Al-Yasin (Arabic: نجيب أفندي اليزين) was the first mayor of Haifa during the Ottoman Empire's era between 1873 and 1877.

== Biography ==
Najib Effendi was born to a noble aristocratic Turkish family during the ruling age of the Ottoman Empire, at the beginning of his life he worked as a lawyer. He is the first mayor of Haifa.

Najib Effendi was an eminent Turkish politician who worked and served the empire for a long time. He dedicated his time to his work that he has been awarded with many medals of honor.

One of the most remarkable medals he received is the medal of honour by Wilhelm II of Germany during his visit to Haifa on October 25, 1898.
