= Aryeh Gur'el =

Israeli politician

- אריה גוראל
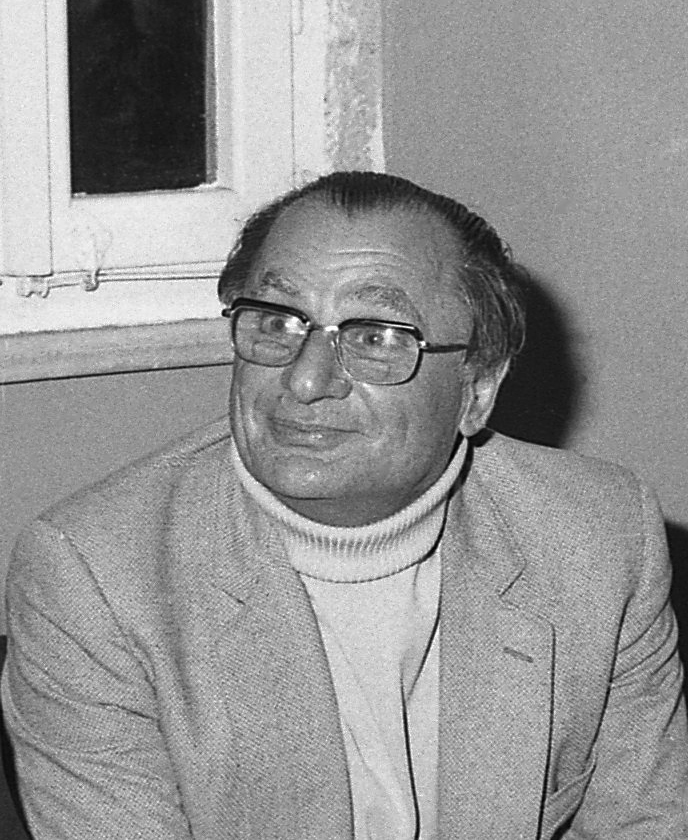

6th Mayor of Haifa
- In office 1978–1993
- Preceded by: Yeruham Zeisel
- Succeeded by: Amram Mitzna

Personal details
- Born: 20 November 1918 Warsaw, Poland
- Died: 28 October 2007 (aged 88) Haifa, Israel
- Party: Israeli Labor Party

Aryeh Gur'el (Hebrew: אריה גוראל; 20 November 1918 - 28 October 2007) was mayor of Haifa from 1978 to 1993. He was affiliated with the Israeli Labor Party.

Gur'el was born in Warsaw, Poland, to parents Moshe and Tzila, and made aliyah in 1935. After arriving in Mandate Palestine, he joined the Haganah. After the 1948 Arab-Israeli War, he studied electrical engineering and worked in the establishment of telephone networks. From 1959 to 1968, he worked as a radio technician in the Haifa area and in northern Israel. Starting in 1968, he served as the General Director of the Ministry of Labour for ten years.

In 1978, Gur'el was elected mayor of Haifa, and was instrumental in establishing the cable car, as well as the promenade in the Bat Galim neighborhood. Also during his time in office, air purification stations were established, and the pedestrian mall on Nordau Street and the Louis Promenade in Merkaz HaCarmel were also built. His reign as mayor of Haifa is remembered by the numerous promenade streets and the funicular. He won reelection in 1983 and 1989, before being defeated in the Labor Party primary election for the 1993 mayoral election.

Gur'el published a number of articles on the topic of the absorption of electromagnetic rays from above the horizon.
