= Timeline of Jaffa =

The following is a timeline of the history of Jaffa.

== Prior to 20th century ==
- 14th century BCE – Egyptians in power.
- 12th to 9th century BCE – Jaffa becomes an important port city under the Philistines, and the northernmost city of the Philistine state.
- 8th century BCE – The Assyrian Empire manages to conquer Jaffa from the Philistines.
- 330 BCE – Coins minted in Jaffa, then under Alexander the Great's Hellenistic Empire.
- 301 BCE – Jaffa becomes part of the Ptolemaic Kingdom.
- 200 BCE – Jaffa becomes part of the Seleucid Empire.
- 142 BCE Jaffa Comes under Hasmonean control
- 68 CE – Jaffa becomes part of the Roman Empire under Vespasian.
- 636 CE – Jaffa is taken from the Romans (Byzantins) by Arab forces under Caliph Omar.
- 1099 AD – Jaffa is temporarily taken from the Muslims by the Christian Crusaders.
- 1126 AD – Knights of St. John in power in Jaffa.
- 1187 – Saladin retakes Jaffa.
- 1191 – Jaffa taken by forces of Crusader King Richard I of England.
- 1196 – Saladin's brother Al-Adil I retakes Jaffa.
- 1252 – Jaffa once again taken from the Mamluks by forces of Christian King Louis IX of France.
- 1268 – The Mamluks reconquer Jaffa and again expel the Crusaders.
- 1538 – Bab el-Halil (gate) built.
- 1517 – Ottomans in power.
- 1654 – Roman Catholic St. Peter's Church built under Ottoman rule.
- 1799
  - 3–7 March: Jaffa besieged by French forces under Napoleon.
  - June: French ousted by British forces.
- 1807 – Muhammad Abu-Nabbut becomes governor.
- 1831 – Ibrahim Pasha in power.
- 1837 – The Galilee earthquake produces high intensity shaking along the Dead Sea Transform on January 1 causing 6,000–7,000 casualties.
- 1838 – Sephardic Talmud Torah school founded in Jaffa.
- 1839 – Ashkenazi Jews coming from Europe settle in Jaffa.
- 1865 – Jaffa lighthouse built.
- 1866 – Population: 5,000. Foundation of the Jaffa American Colony.
- 1868 – German Colony established.
- 1871 – Municipal council established.
- 1879 – Jaffa city walls demolished to accommodate growth of city.
- 1884 – Ashkenazic Talmud Torah school established.
- 1887 – Population: 14,000.
- 1891 – Ramla-Jaffa railway begins operating; Jaffa Railway Station opens; Hospital Sha'ar Ziyyon founded.
- 1892 – Jaffa–Jerusalem railway completed.
- 1897 – Population: 33,465.

== 20th century ==
- 1902 – Cholera epidemic; Trumpeldor Cemetery established.
- 1908 – March: Zionist-Palestinian unrest.
- 1909 – Tel Aviv founded near Jaffa.
- 1911 – Filastin newspaper begins publication.
- 1913 – Population: 50,000.
- 1916 – Hassan Bek Mosque built.
- 1917 – April: Jaffa deportation: amidst World War I, all inhabitants of Jaffa (including Tel Aviv), Jews and Muslims alike, are expelled from the city on Ottoman orders.
- 1917 – December: Battle of Jaffa (1917).
- 1918 – Muslim-Christian Association established.
- 1921 – May: Jaffa riots.
- 1932 – National Congress of Arab Youth held.
- 1936 – April: Arab-Jewish unrest.
- 1945 – Al-Najjada paramilitary youth group established.
- 1947 – In the United Nations Partition Plan for Palestine, Jaffa is proposed to be within the new Arab state, as opposed to Tel Aviv, which would be part of the Jewish State.
- 1948 – Israeli declaration of Independence; on 14 May, Zionist Irgun forces take Jaffa, which becomes part of the new State of Israel.
- 1950 – Jaffa attached to Tel Aviv: Tel Aviv-Jaffa municipality formed on 24 April. Jaffa Administration (municipal department) established.
- 1960 – Company for the Development of Ancient Jaffa established.

== See also ==
- History of Jaffa
- Timeline of the history of the region of Palestine

== Bibliography ==
Published in 19th century

- Abraham Rees, "Joppa", The Cyclopaedia, Philadelphia: S.F. Bradford, hdl:2027/njp.32101078163530. Published circa 1820s
- Josiah Conder (1830), "(Jaffa)", Palestine, The Modern Traveller, London: J.Duncan
- "Jaffa", Cook's Tourists' Handbook for Palestine and Syria, London: T. Cook & Son, 1876
- Èmile Isambert (1881). "Jaffa". Itinéraire descriptif, historique et archéologique de l'Orient. Guides Joanne (in French). Vol. 3: Syrie, Palestine. Hachette. hdl:2027/nyp.33433002689614.
- "Jaffa", Handbook for Travellers in Syria and Palestine (3rd ed.), Leipsig: K. Baedeker, 1898 (+ 1876 ed. and 1912 ed.)

Published in 20th century

- M. Franco (1907), "Jaffa", Jewish Encyclopedia, vol. 7, New York
- Macalister, Robert Alexander Stewart (1910). "Joppa" . Encyclopædia Britannica. Vol. 15 (11th ed.). p. 508.
- Benjamin Vincent (1910). "Jaffa". Haydn's Dictionary of Dates (25th ed.). London: Ward, Lock & Co.
- "Yafa". Encyclopaedia of Islam. E.J. Brill. 1927. p. 1143+. ISBN 9789004097940.
- Ruth Kark (1981). "The Traditional Middle Eastern City: The Cases of Jerusalem and Jaffa During the Nineteenth Century". Zeitschrift des Deutschen Palästina-Vereins. 97 (1): 93–108. JSTOR 27931156.
- Yousef Heikal and Imad El-Haj (1984). "Jaffa...as It Was". Journal of Palestine Studies. 13 (4): 3–21. doi:10.1525/jps.1984.13.4.00p0062u. JSTOR 2536987.
- Charles Issawi (1988), "The trade of Jaffa 1825–1914", in Hisham Nashabe (ed.), Studia Palaestina
- Ruth Kark (1990). Jaffa: a city in evolution, 1799–1917. Yad Izhak Ben-Zvi Press. ISBN 978-965-217-065-1.

Published in 21st century

- "Jaffa — Bride of the Sea" or "Yaffo — Kalat Hayam" 2000, By Israeli artist Natali Lipin (views of the city Old Jaffa). Language — Hebrew/English.
- Iris Agmon (2004). "Recording Procedures and Legal Culture in the Late Ottoman Shariʿa Court of Jaffa, 1865–1890". Islamic Law and Society. 11 (3): 333–377. doi:10.1163/1568519042544376. JSTOR 3399187.
- Mark LeVine (2005). Overthrowing Geography: Jaffa, Tel Aviv, and the Struggle for Palestine, 1880–1948. University of California Press. ISBN 978-0-520-93850-2.
- Philip Mattar (2005). "Jaffa". Encyclopedia of the Palestinians. Facts on File. p. 256. ISBN 978-0-8160-6986-6.
- Adam LeBor (2006). City of Oranges: An Intimate History of Arabs and Jews in Jaffa. W. W. Norton. ISBN 978-0-393-32984-1.
- Michael R.T. Dumper; Bruce E. Stanley, eds. (2008), "Jaffa", Cities of the Middle East and North Africa, Santa Barbara, USA: ABC-CLIO, p. 199+, ISBN 9781576079201
- Nurit Alfasi; Roy Fabian (2009). "Preserving Urban Heritage: From Old Jaffa to Modern Tel-Aviv". Israel Studies. 14 (3): 137–156. doi:10.2979/ISR.2009.14.3.137. JSTOR 30245876. S2CID 145726369.
- Aaron A. Burke; et al. (2010). "Egyptians in Jaffa: A Portrait of Egyptian Presence in Jaffa during the Late Bronze Age". Near Eastern Archaeology. 73 (1): 2–30. doi:10.1086/NEA20697244. JSTOR 20697244. S2CID 147699678.
- David Abulafia (2011). "A Tale of Four and a Half Cities, 1900–1950". The Great Sea: A Human History of the Mediterranean. Oxford University Press. p. 592+. ISBN 978-0-19-975263-8. (about Alexandria, Jaffa, Salonika, Smyrna)
- Martin Peilstöcker and Aaron A. Burke, ed. (2011). History and Archaeology of Jaffa 1. Cotsen Institute of Archaeology Press. ISBN 978-1-931745-81-9.
- Yasemin Avci (2011). "Jerusalem and Jaffa in the Late Ottoman Period". In Yuval Ben-Bassat and Eyal Ginio (ed.). Late Ottoman Palestine: The Period of Young Turk Rule. I.B.Tauris. p. 81+. ISBN 978-0-85771-994-2.
