= Yosef Almogi =

Israeli politician (1910–1991)

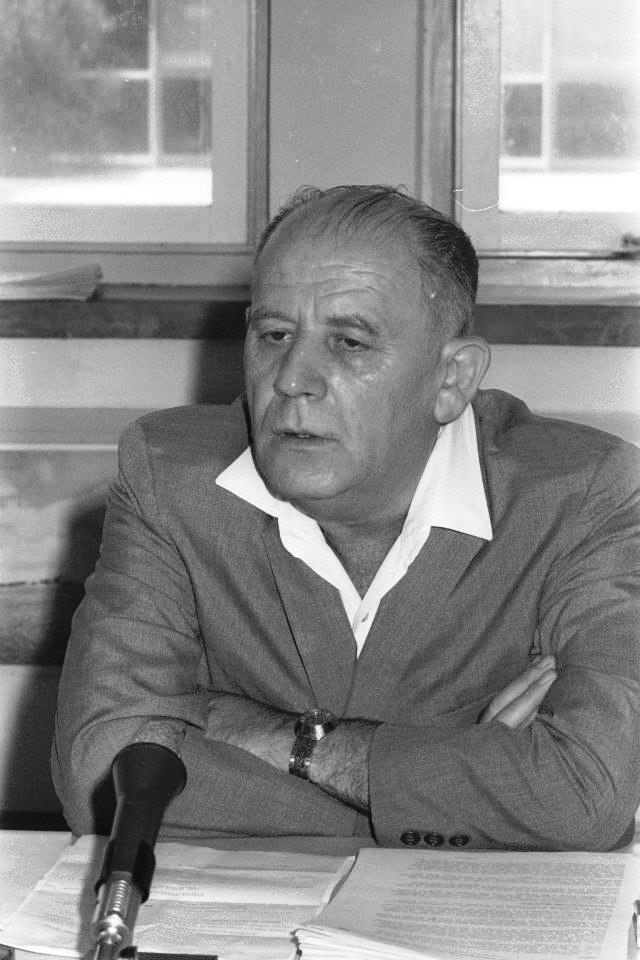

Ministerial roles
- 1962: Minister without Portfolio
- 1962–1965: Minister of Housing
- 1962–1965: Minister of Development
- 1968–1974: Minister of Labor

Faction represented in the Knesset
- 1955–1965: Mapai
- 1965–1968: Rafi
- 1968–1969: Labor Party
- 1969–1977: Alignment

Personal details
- Born: 5 May 1910 Hrubieszów, Russian Empire
- Died: 2 November 1991 (aged 81)

Yosef Aharon Almogi (Hebrew: יוסף אהרון אלמוגי; 5 May 1910 – 2 November 1991) was an Israeli politician who served as a member of the Knesset between 1955 and 1977, as well as holding several ministerial posts.

== Biography ==
Born Josef Karlenboim in Hrubieszów in the Russian Empire (today in Poland), he joined the Dror movement in 1924 and moved to Mandate Palestine in 1930. He served as a commander of the Haganah in Kfar Saba, Tel Aviv (1936) and Haifa (1937). In 1940, he enlisted in the British Army, and served with the Auxiliary Military Pioneer Corps in Egypt, Libya, and Greece during World War II. He was captured in Greece in 1941 and was a POW in German captivity until 1945.

Upon returning to Israel after the war, Almogi became active in politics and joined David Ben-Gurion's Mapai. He was active in the Haifa Workers Council, serving as Alternate Secretary from 1947 to 1951 and then Secretary from 1951 to 1959. He was the General Secretary of Mapai from 1959 to 1961.

First elected to the Knesset in the 1955 elections, Almogi was made Minister without Portfolio after the 1961 elections, before taking over the roles of Minister of Housing and Minister of Development in October 1962. When Levi Eshkol replaced Ben-Gurion as PM in 1963, Almogi kept both positions.

However, when Ben-Gurion led a breakaway from Mapai to form Rafi shortly before the 1965 elections, Almogi followed, losing his cabinet position in the process. Elected back to the Knesset on Rafi's list, Almogi became Minister of Labour in July 1968 when together with Mapam, Rafi merged into Eshkol's Alignment (a merger of Mapai and Ahdut HaAvoda). He retained his position after the 1969 elections, but was not included in Golda Meir's cabinet after the 1973 elections.

During his last term in the Knesset, Almogi also briefly served as the mayor of Haifa (1974–1975). He then served as chairman of the World Zionist Organization from 1975 to 1978 and head of the Jewish Agency Executive from 1976 to 1978.

He died in Haifa on 2 November 1991.

== Bibliography ==
- Total Commitment. Herzl Press. 1982. ISBN 0-8453-4749-7.
- The Struggle for Ben-Gurion (in Hebrew). 1988. ISBN 965-248-089-4.
- Standing Tall: Jewish Soldiers in Nazi Hands. Niv Books. 2023. ISBN 978-965-7816-87-5.
