= Abba Hushi =

Polish-born Israeli politician (1898–1969)

- אבא חושי
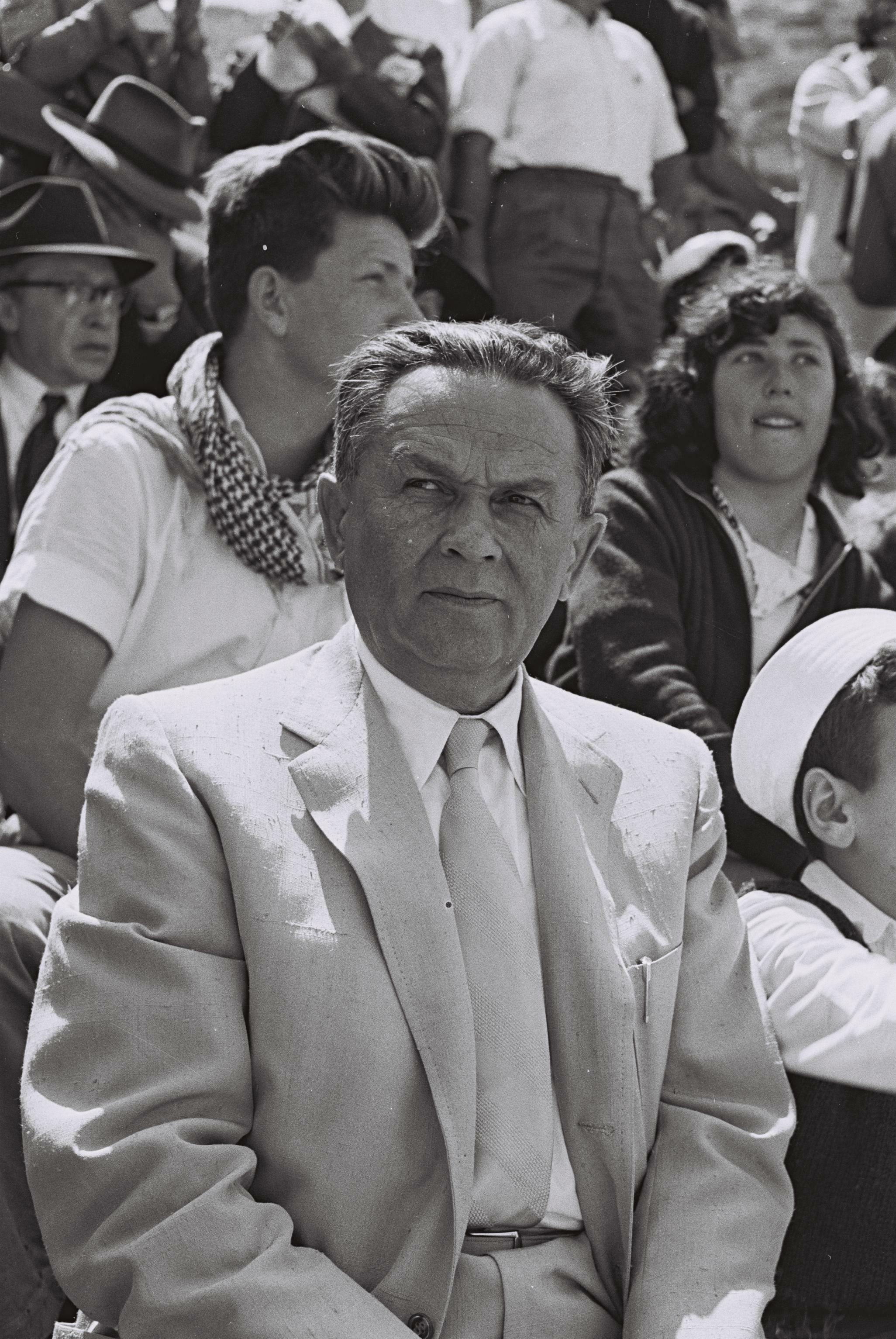

Faction represented in the Knesset
- 1949–1951: Mapai

Personal details
- Born: 1898; Turka, Austria-Hungary
- Died: 24 March 1969

Abba Hushi (Also: Aba Khoushy; Hebrew: אבא חושי; born Abba Schneller; 1898 – 24 March 1969) was an Israeli politician who served as mayor of Haifa for eighteen years between 1951 and 1969. Hushi was one of the founders and activists of Hashomer Hatzair movement in Poland. In July 1920, he settled to Mandatory Palestine with a group of 130 Jewish pioneers. There he took the Hebrew surname "Hushi" ["speedy"], a translation of his original name, Schneller. He built roads and drained swamps, and helped to found kibbutz Beit Alfa. He was one of the founding members of the Histadrut labor federation. In 1927, he settled in Haifa and joined the Ahdut HaAvoda party, which later merged with Mapai. He was secretary of the Haifa Workers Council from 1931 to 1951. Hushi was elected to Israel's first Knesset in 1949 as a member of Mapai. Before the 1951 elections, he left the government to become mayor of Haifa. As mayor, he helped to found the University of Haifa, the Haifa Theatre, the Tikotin Museum of Japanese Art, the Mane-Katz Museum and the Carmelit (Haifa's funicular railway).

Abba Hushi was the father-in-law of Knesset member Amnon Linn.

== Biography ==
=== Childhood and Aliyah ===
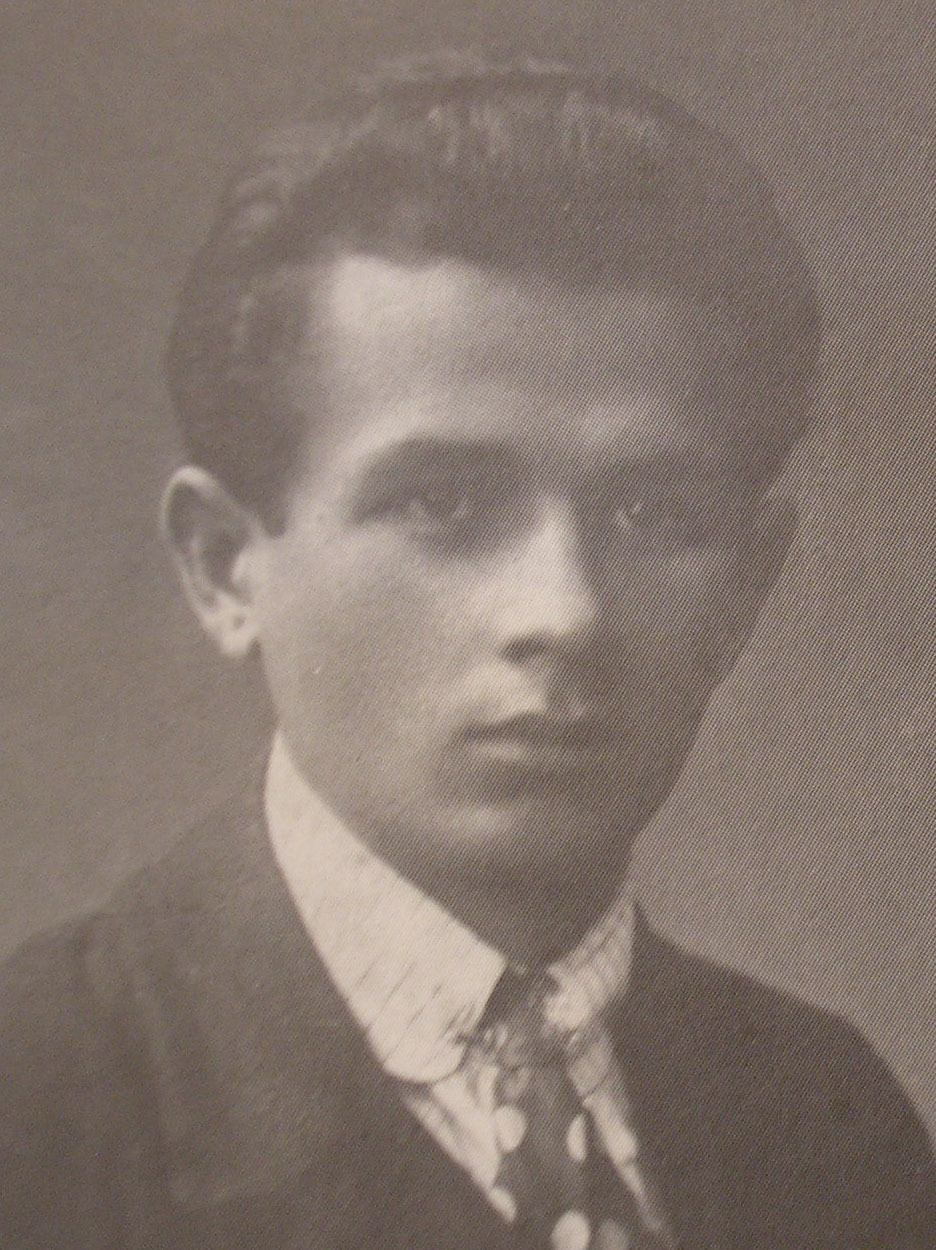
Abba Hushi at age 18

==== Family-background ====
Abba Hushi was born in 1898 in Turka, Galicia, then part of Austria-Hungary (today in Ukraine). His mother, Liba, ran a small farm, where she grew fruits and vegetables. After divorcing her first husband, Liba moved to Turka and married Zisha, a haberdasher. To avoid the draft, Zisha changed his name to Alexander, took Liba's surname, "Schneller," and hid in the attic of Liba's farmhouse.

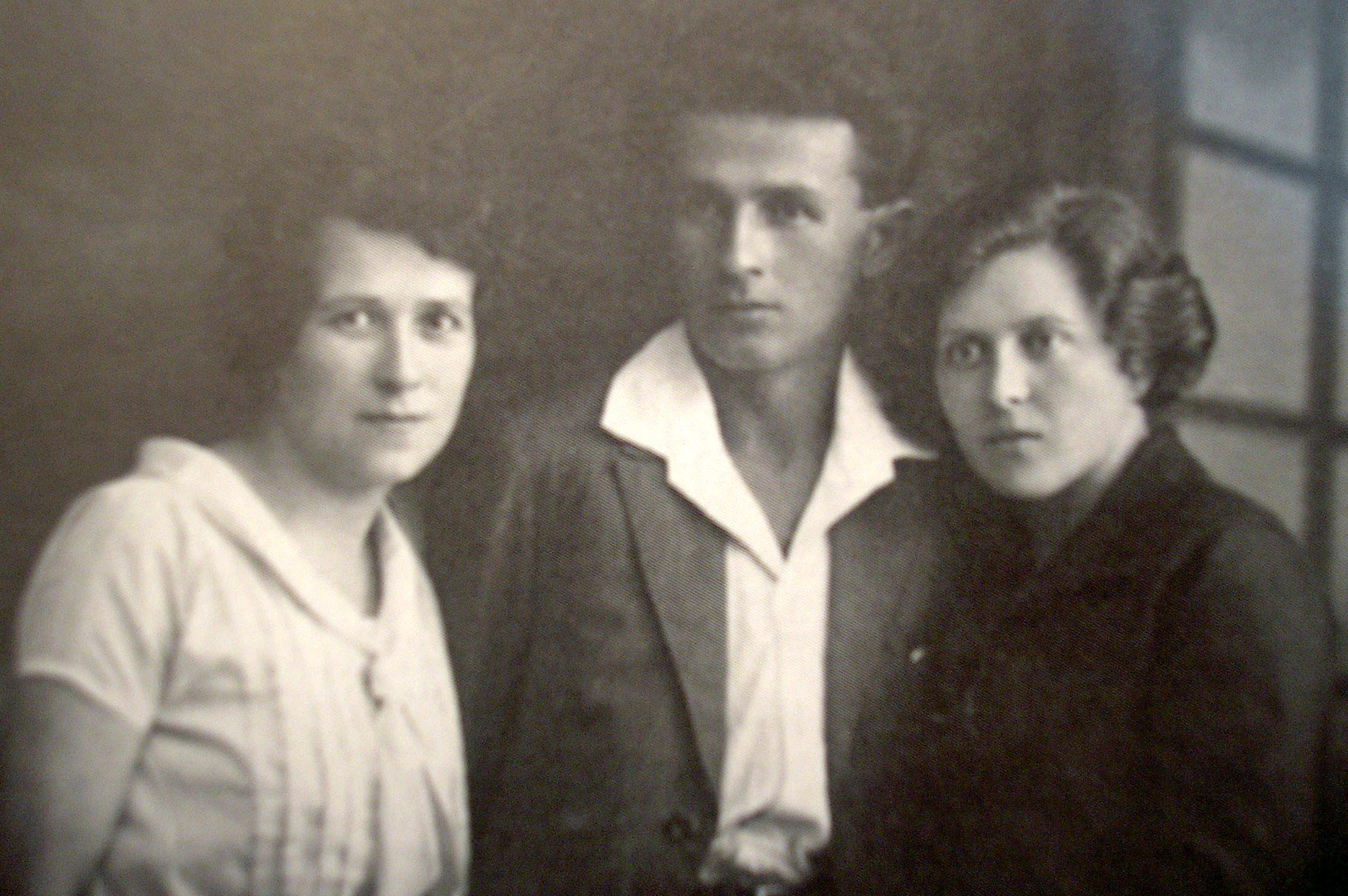
Abba and two of his sisters

The Schnellers had seven children: Ettia, Abba, Hinda, Ya'akov, Rosa, Malka and Harry from Liba's first marriage.

==== Education ====
After attending a heder, Hushi studied at the local gymnasium. He spoke Yiddish, German, Hebrew, Ukrainian and Polish, and knew some Greek and Latin. He planned to study medicine and even wrote "Property of Medical Student Abba Schneller" on his notebooks, but his plans were disrupted by the outbreak of World War I in 1914. The Schneller family fled to Bohemia.

==== Involvement in Hashomer Hatzair ====
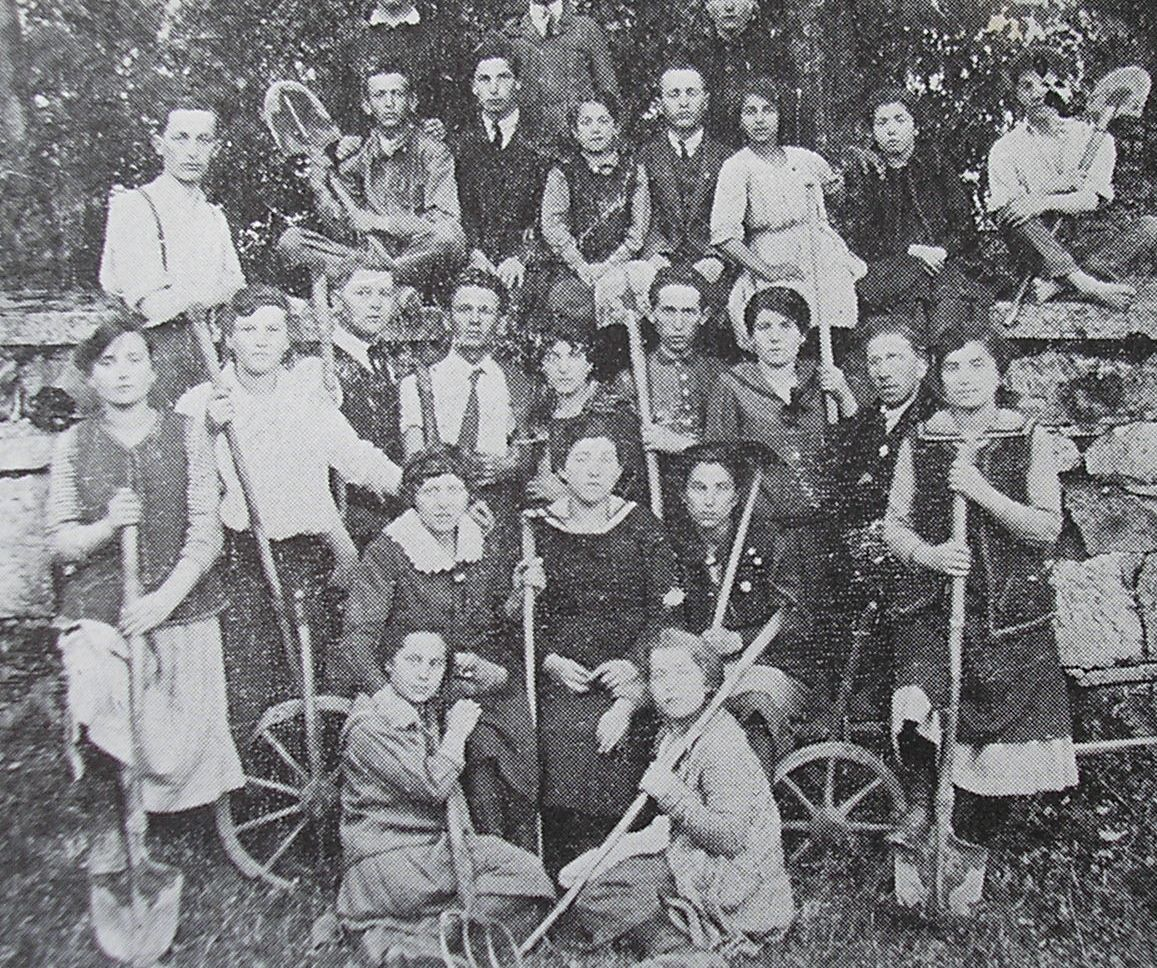
Hushi on Hachshara soon after his Aliyah

After the family's return to Turka in 1918, the city fell under Polish rule. Antisemitism was on the rise, so a group of members of Hashomer Hatzair organized into an independent Jewish protection force. They were successful in Turka and stopped pogroms and other attacks, although in other cities throughout Poland these attacks continued.

On 4 and 5 August 1918, a Hashomer Hatzair conference was held in Turka. Hushi was one of the chairs of the conference, and there he called for immigration to the land of Israel. In the spring of 1920, at another Hashomer Hatzair conference in Lviv, Abba read publicly for the first time the words to his poem "In the Galil, at Tel Hai" inspired by the courage of Joseph Trumpeldor at Tel Hai. Indeed, the decisions made at the conference mirrored the spirit at Tel Hai: it was decided that the graduating group of Hashomer Hatzair would make Aliyah, and the workers of the movement would assist in the realization of this decision.

=== Pioneer in Palestine ===
==== Road Worker ====
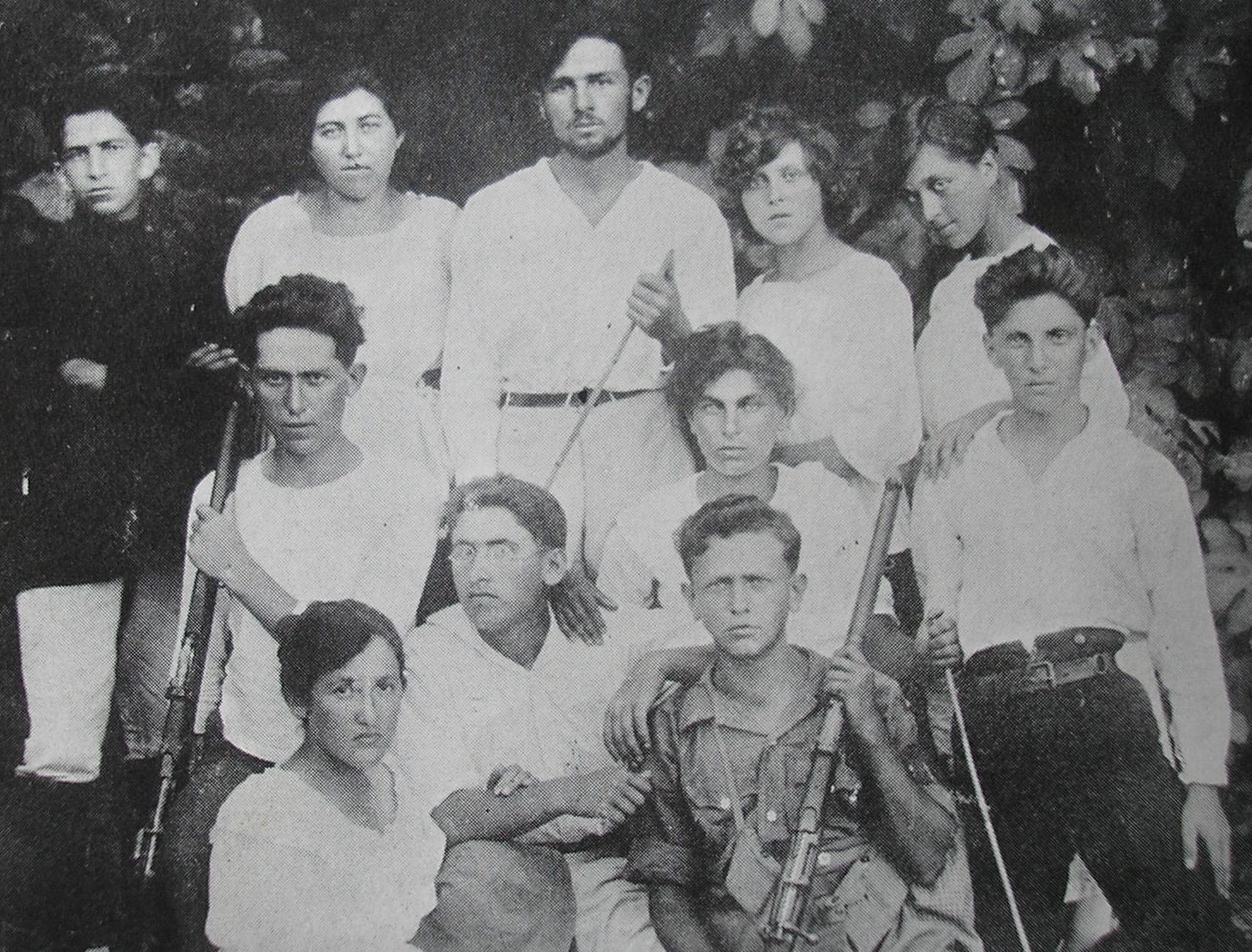
Hushi in the period when he has working near Rosh Pina

The work office of the Hapoel Hatzair movement took responsibility for finding employment for its members of who had recently arrived in Palestine. Hushi's group found work in paving roads, a project initiated by the first High Commissioner of Palestine, Herbert Samuel. Hushi worked on roads around Rosh Pinna, and in 1920 and 1921, Hushi was the head of the "Shomria Unit," the group that paved the Haifa-J'da (a.k.a. Ramat Yishai) road.

==== Haifa Port ====
Abba Hushi and the other members of his group volunteered to unload coal at the Port of Haifa. The "Workers of Israel" fund received the contract to unload the coal, but the Haifa workers refused to unload the coal. Hushi and his co-workers volunteered for the difficult work, which left them covered in soot and often led to eye infections.

==== Founding the Histadrut ====
In December 1920, the "Shomria Unit" send two representatives, one of them Abba Hushi, to the "First General Conference of the Workers of Israel." By the end of the conference, the delegates decided to establish a union for the Hebrew workers in the land of Israel; the Histadrut.

==== Drying swamps and founding Beit Alfa ====
In 1921, the members of the group transferred to Nahalal, where they paved the entrance road to the moshav and also worked in drying and draining the surrounding swamps. Abba Hushi petitioned on behalf of the entire group, for land in order to establish a settlement in the Jezreel Valley. In 1922, the request was approved and Hushi was among the founding members of kibbutz Beit Alfa.

==== Delegate in the Diaspora ====
After the establishment of the Kibbutz, Abba was sent by the Jewish National Fund to raise funds in Poland. The money would be used to buy land and establish settlements. Hushi was accompanied by Meir Ya'ari. In 1924, Ya'ari and Hushi arrived in Danzig, where they attended two conferences; the Hashomer Hatzair conference and the "Youth Covenant" movement conference (which David Ben-Gurion also attended). At the Hashomer Hatzair conference, Hushi was chosen for the board of the world Hashomer Hatzair movement.

After the conferences, Hushi and Ya'ari continued their fund-raising efforts on behalf of the JNF. They also visited local branches of, and summer camps run by Hashomer Hatzair throughout Poland in order to encourage the youths to make aliyah. Throughout the entire trip, Hushi corresponded with his girl friend Hannah, who remained in Beit Alfa. As part of his travels, Abba arrived in Turka, where, in February 1925, he convinced his family to make aliyah.

==== Moving to Haifa ====
In 1925, Hushi took a year off from the kibbutz to help his family settle in Haifa, and become acclimated with Israeli life. Hushi initiated the creation of a working-class restaurant that his family would own and operate, thereby earning a living. While in Haifa he continued his public service: on 19 April 1925, Hushi hosted a meeting of representatives from Kibbutzim that had foreign youths.

==== Additional delegation abroad ====
Following his great success on his previous trip to Poland, the Zionist committee asked Hushi to go abroad again. This time, he requested to travel with his girlfriend Hanna. The members of the kibbutz argued against his and Hanna's departures. Hushi wrote to Hanna:

My dear Hanna: Last night I returned from Jerusalem. There, I began the passport application process for the two of us. I submitted my previous passport and a picture of both of us...I have chosen to go, and what will be, will be...I have very little money and we will barely be able to buy anything. I'll go in torn pants – but that doesn't matter. To the angry people in the Kibbutz, explain, if you'd like to, that I couldn't choose otherwise. I must bear the responsibility that others have placed on me.

==== Marriage to Hannah ====
Hushi's relationship with Hannah grew closer while they were in Turka, although Hannah's father was not happy with the match. On Lag Ba'omer 1926, the Chief Rabbi of Haifa, Rabbi Kaniel, officiated at their wedding. On 29 March 1927, their daughter Ruth was born. Hannah remained in Beit Alfa while Hushi went to Haifa to help his family run the restaurant and continue his activities on behalf of the Histadrut. Hannah joined him in June. In September 1930, their son, Gadi, was born. Gadi died in an accident on 12 January 1932. Another son, Dan, was born the following year.

=== Activity for the Histadrut in Haifa ===
In 1925 Hushi moved to Haifa in order to assist his parents, but he continued being politically active. In 1926 he began to work for the Histadrut in Haifa, and would eventually become a central activist in the Ahdut HaAvoda and then Mapai parties.

==== Treatment of the workers in the Port of Haifa ====
In his first position in the Histadrut, Hushi substituted for Yaacov Razili, who failed to settle to confrontation between the longtime laborers in the port, and the new immigrants who were sent to work in the port by the Histadrut. After much hard work and tremendous effort, Hushi convinced the port workers to sign an agreement with the Histadrut.

==== Secretary of the Haifa Workers Council ====
In 1932, Hushi was chosen chairman of the Haifa Workers Council (a position that he held until 1951). He believed that it was upon the Council to create a connection with every worker in its jurisdiction (the city of Haifa). He also saw to it that in every workplace a "worker's committee" was established (in workplaces where only a few people worked "trustees" were appointed) that would maintain contact between the workers and the Histadrut. Hushi's actions caused a great increase in the number or workers who were associated with different labor organizations.

===== Building controversy =====
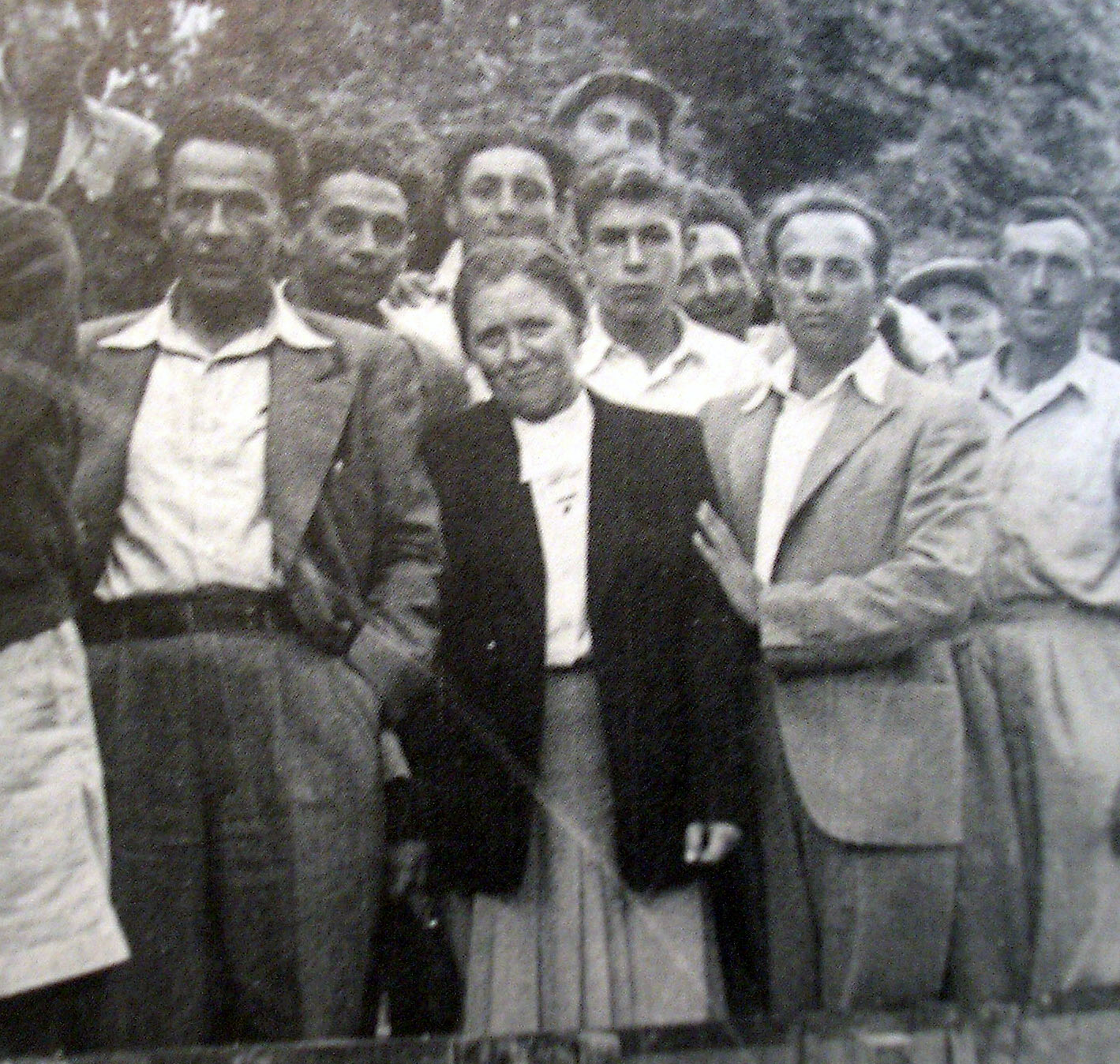
Abba & Hannah on their way to a protest.

In 1934, Jewish contractors experimented with Arab workers, who were less expensive to employ than Jewish workers. The Histadrut responded with strikes and protests. The height of the controversy was in the Borovsky House construction site, where the contractor employed exclusively Arab workers, and didn't "reserve" any jobs for Jewish workers. As a reaction, Hushi sent workers to picket the site, who disturbed the building process. The contractor complained to the police, and the picketing workers were arrested. Nevertheless, Hushi continued to send workers to protest. The protests continued for 684 days, and a total of 2259 days of jail time were served by workers who had picketed. By the end of the conflict, the contractor gave in and was forced to employ Jewish workers who were members of the Workers Council.

===== Assisting the unemployed =====
Due to the great stress that existed in Israel in the 1930s, Hushi worried about the unemployed workers in his city. As the secretary of the council, Hushi persuaded the other members to establish a staff that would look after the unemployed workers, and provide them with temporary work. The staff would find places of employment and divide the work among the unemployed workers, meaning that full-time workers had to give up on some work time to allow the unemployed people to come in and work. This style of distributing work differed from that practiced in other workers councils throughout Palestine. Among other things, the organization forced young workers and workers having other alternatives to relinquish their jobs to older, more seasoned workers, who had lost their places of employment.

===== "Hapoel" Organization =====
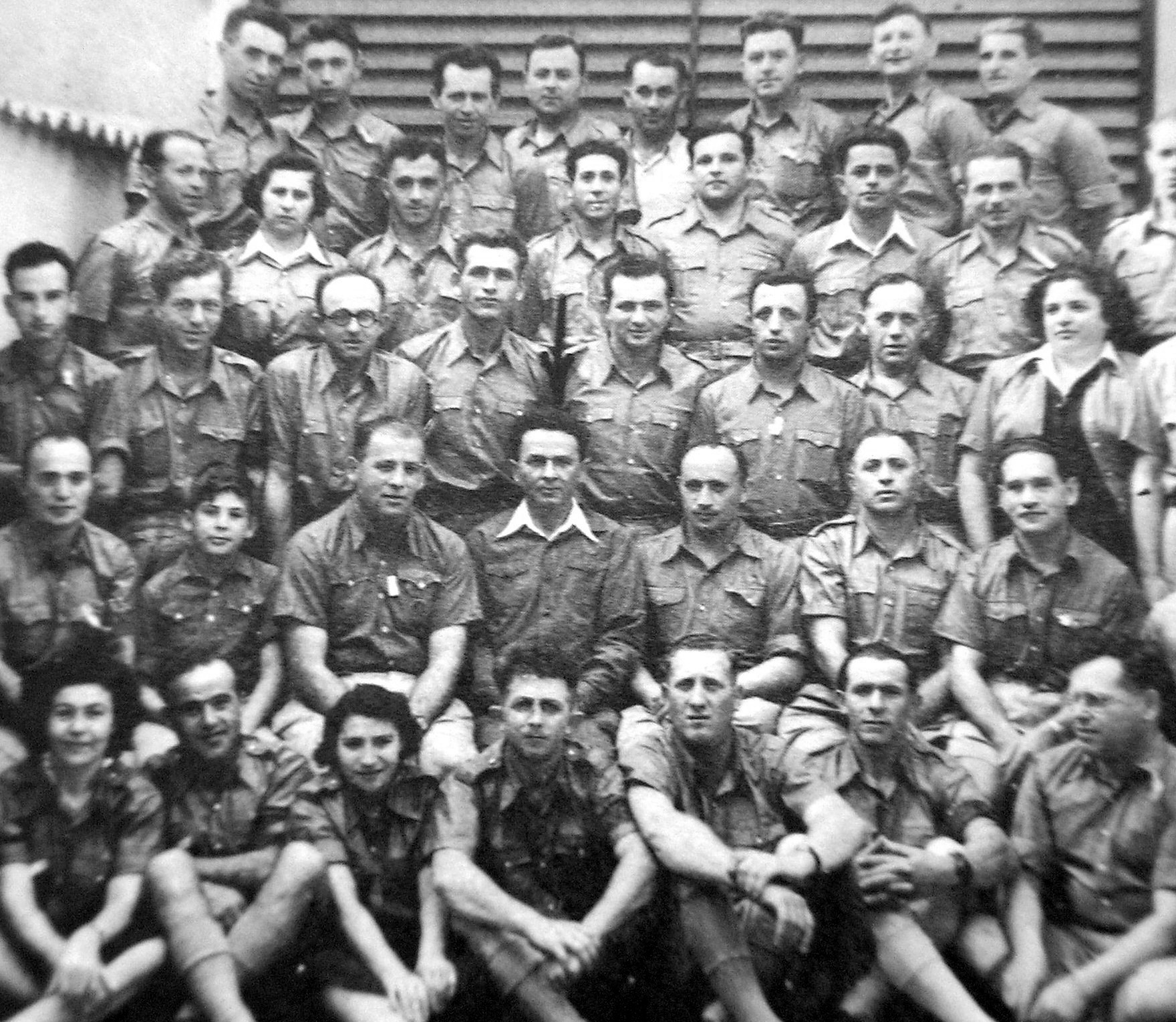
Abba Hushi with members of "The Organizer's Division."

One of the first organizations that Hushi supported in Haifa was the Hapoel sports club. He was assisted by members of the organization "The Organizer's Division," in order to protect the institution of, and obedience to, the Histadrut and the Workers Council.

===== Bringing Thessaloniki port workers to Haifa =====
With the founding of the port of Haifa, Baruch Uziel, who had made Aliyah from Thessaloniki, Greece, convinced the Workers Council to bring on Aliyah Thessalonikian port workers, in order to guarantee a majority of Jewish port workers. As a result of Uziel's request, Hushi traveled to Thessaloniki, where he successfully convinced the Jewish port workers to make Aliya with their families.

Following his success in Thessaloniki, Hushi traveled to Poland and managed to convince Jewish porters there also to make Aliya. The Aliya of the Thessaloniki port workers caused there to be a majority of Jewish workers in the port. This allowed operation of the port and the un-interrupted export of Jewish goods during the 1936–1939 Arab revolt in Palestine. On May Day 1936, since there was a fear that the port workers would strike, Hushi ordered them to work, despite the fact that it was Workers' Day, and the port-workers strike was avoided. On 8 August 1936, the Arab workers ceased to come to the port to work, and the port was operated solely by Jewish workers for a number of months.

===== Boycott of German ships, Haifa 1938 =====
On 29 December 1938, while loading citrus fruits onto the German ship Bamburg in the Port of Haifa, the second officer of the ship said to the port worker in charge of loading the fruits that "the Jews have no place in the world, not even at the North Pole, [...] the only option was to send all of the Jews to 'the second world.'"

The Jewish workers who heard the officer's words informed other workers, and word reached the administration of the Haifa Workers Council, who decided to stop loading the ship. The administration of the Council also instructed the Arab workers not to work, and the port stopped servicing German ships. Hushi informed Dov Hoz, the chairman of the State Committee of the Jewish Agency, of the decision. David Hacohen informed Hushi of his disapproval of the decision, since it had not been approved by the official organizations of the Yishuv, despite the fact that the Workers Council of the Histadrut had approved the new policy.

On the following day, 30 December, the German consul in Haifa turned to influential Olim from Germany to have them convince Hushi to call off the new policy. The consul announced that the Second Officer would apologize and would be punished for his offensive remarks, but Hushi did not relent, and the Bamburg returned to Germany empty. In order not to hurt the interests of the Jewish Yishuv, Hushi contacted "Citrus Center" in Jaffa with a request to find other ships with which to send their produce to Europe. He wrote to them: "We do not want to cause you [financial] loss, and therefore we are giving you options and time to organize the matter. We are not able to overcome our emotions, and the emotions of our workers, to continue to load German ships."

== Published works ==
- In the House of the Workers of Israel (1943)
