= Medtech =

Medtech or MedTech may refer to:

- Medical technology
- Medtech (medical education), a medical education facility founded in 2004 in Indianapolis, U.S.
- Medtech (robotic surgery), a medical robotics company founded in 2002 in Montpellier, France
- MedTech Europe, a Brussels-based trade association of the European medical technology industry
- Dornier Medtech, a former division of Dornier Flugzeugwerke
- Medtech Labs, a company founded in 1955 that was a founding joint venture partner in Prestige Brands
