= Corindus Vascular Robotics =

- Traded as: AMEX: CVRS; Russell Microcap Index component

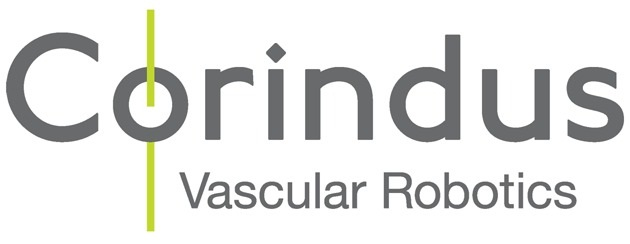
Corindus Vascular Robotics.

Corindus, Inc. was founded in Israel in 2002 by Rafael Beyar, an interventional cardiologist, and his student at the Technion, Tal Wenderow. The company's original goal was to use remote control and robotics to move coronary guidewires and balloon/stent catheters.

Corindus Vascular Robotics, Inc. (NYSE: CVRS) was later moved to the United States to be headquartered in Waltham, Massachusetts. The company's FDA-cleared CorPath® System became the first medical device that allows interventionalists to manipulate guidewires and balloon/stents from an interventional cockpit.

The company went public in August 2014 and traded on the New York Stock Exchange under the ticker symbol CVRS.

Under the leadership of CEO Mark Toland and CFO David Long, the company continued to grow and received additional clearances from the FDA. Investments in the development of next generation products and expanded regulatory clearances lead to the negotiation of a potential strategic transaction. In August 2019, Siemens Healthineers publicly announced its intention to acquire Corindus for $1.1 billion. The final transaction closed in October 2019, representing one of the largest MedTech deals in 2019.
