= List of colleges and universities in metropolitan Atlanta =

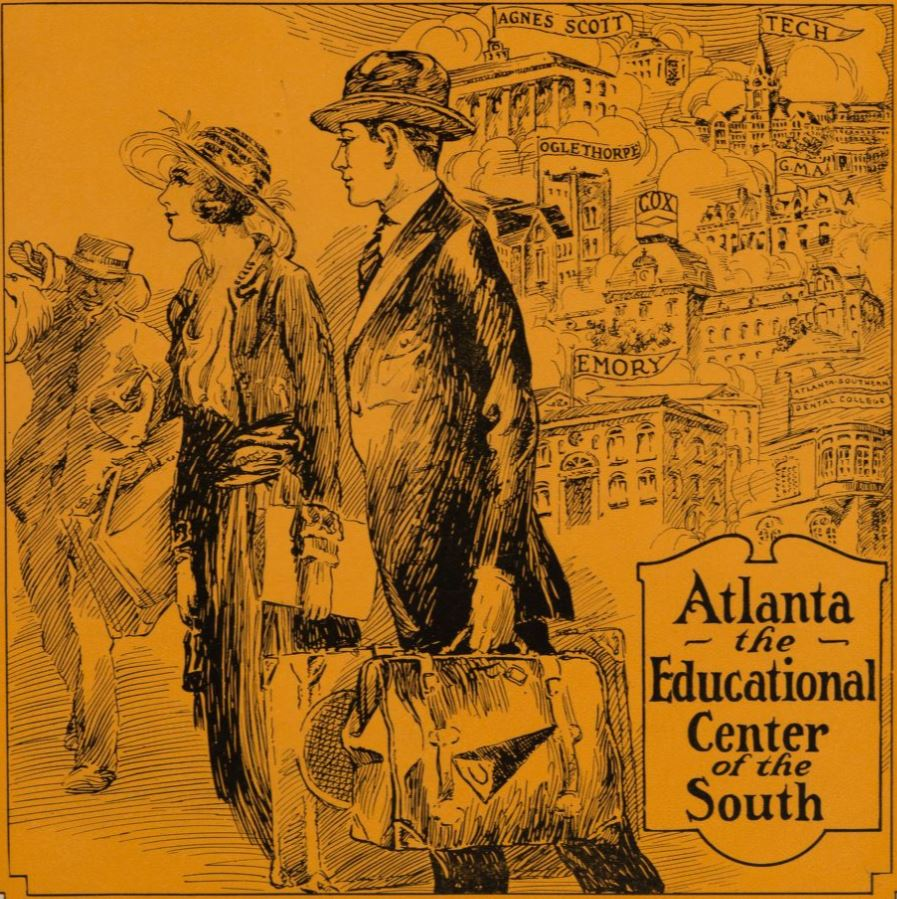
Cartoon from 1922 showing several colleges and universities in the metropolitan area

Atlanta, Georgia is home to the largest concentration of colleges and universities in the Southern United States. Two of the most important public universities in Georgia, Georgia Tech and Georgia State, have their campuses downtown. A campus of the University of Georgia's Terry College of Business, that focuses on EMBAs, can also be found in the city.

Emory University is the highest ranked university in the metropolitan area.

The most prestigious HBCUs, (Clark Atlanta University, Spelman College, and Morehouse College) are also found in Atlanta. The educational landscape in Atlanta is rounded out by the smaller liberal arts colleges of Agnes Scott College and Oglethorpe University.

Founded in 1938, the Atlanta Regional Council for Higher Education (ARCHE) is a nonprofit organization of 18 public and private colleges and universities. Students are able to register for courses across member-institutions and have access to six affiliated libraries.

This is a list of all of the colleges and universities in the city of Atlanta and Metro Atlanta.

== City of Atlanta ==
=== Universities and graduate institutions ===
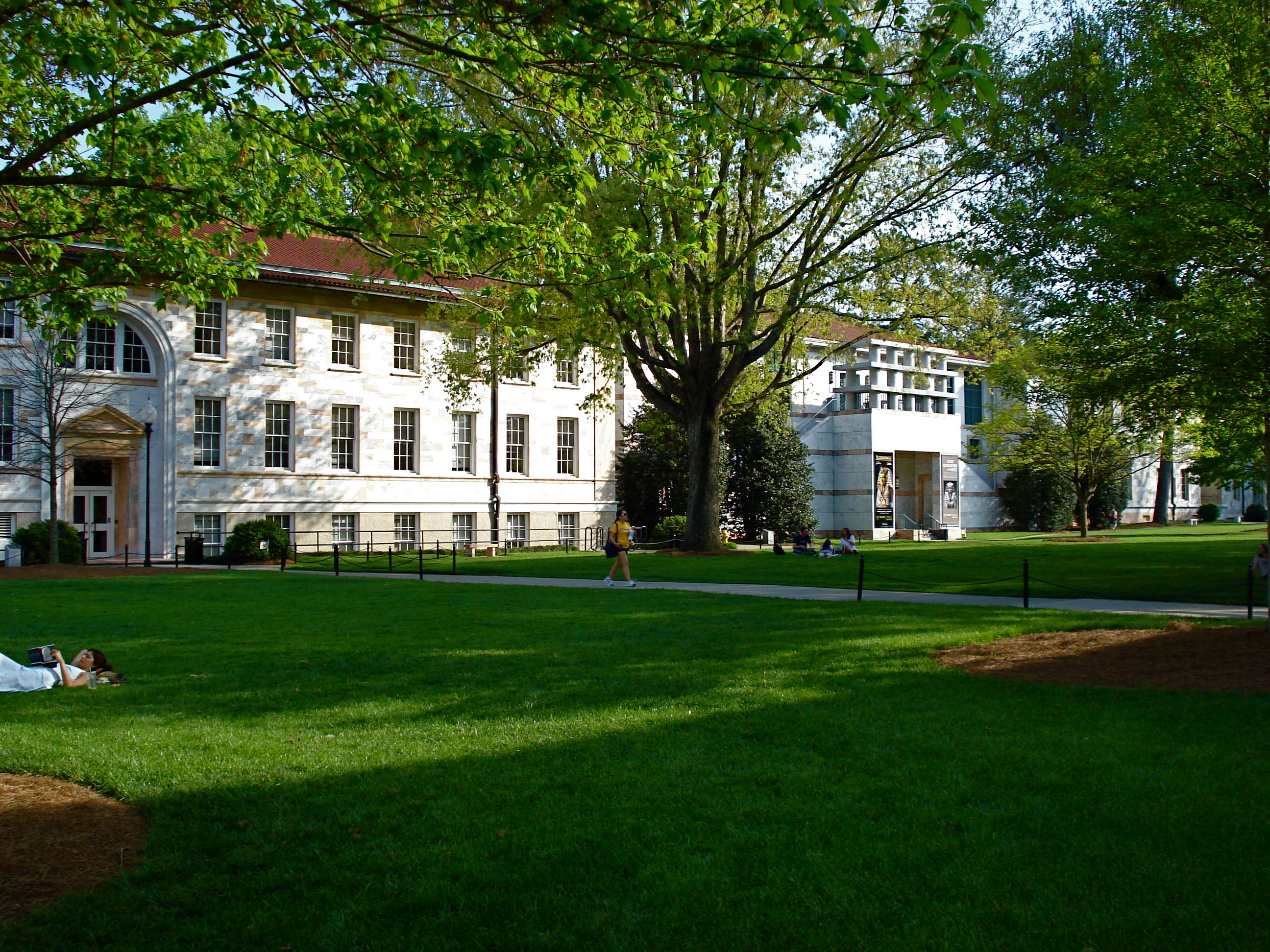
Emory University

- American InterContinental University
- Beulah Heights University
- Clark Atlanta University
- DeVry University
- Emory University
  - Annexed by the City of Atlanta effective January 1, 2018
- Georgia Institute of Technology
- Georgia State University
- Interdenominational Theological Center
- John Marshall Law School
- Mercer University (Cecil B. Day Graduate and Professional Campus)
- Morehouse School of Medicine
- University of Georgia (Terry College of Business Atlanta Center)

=== Colleges ===
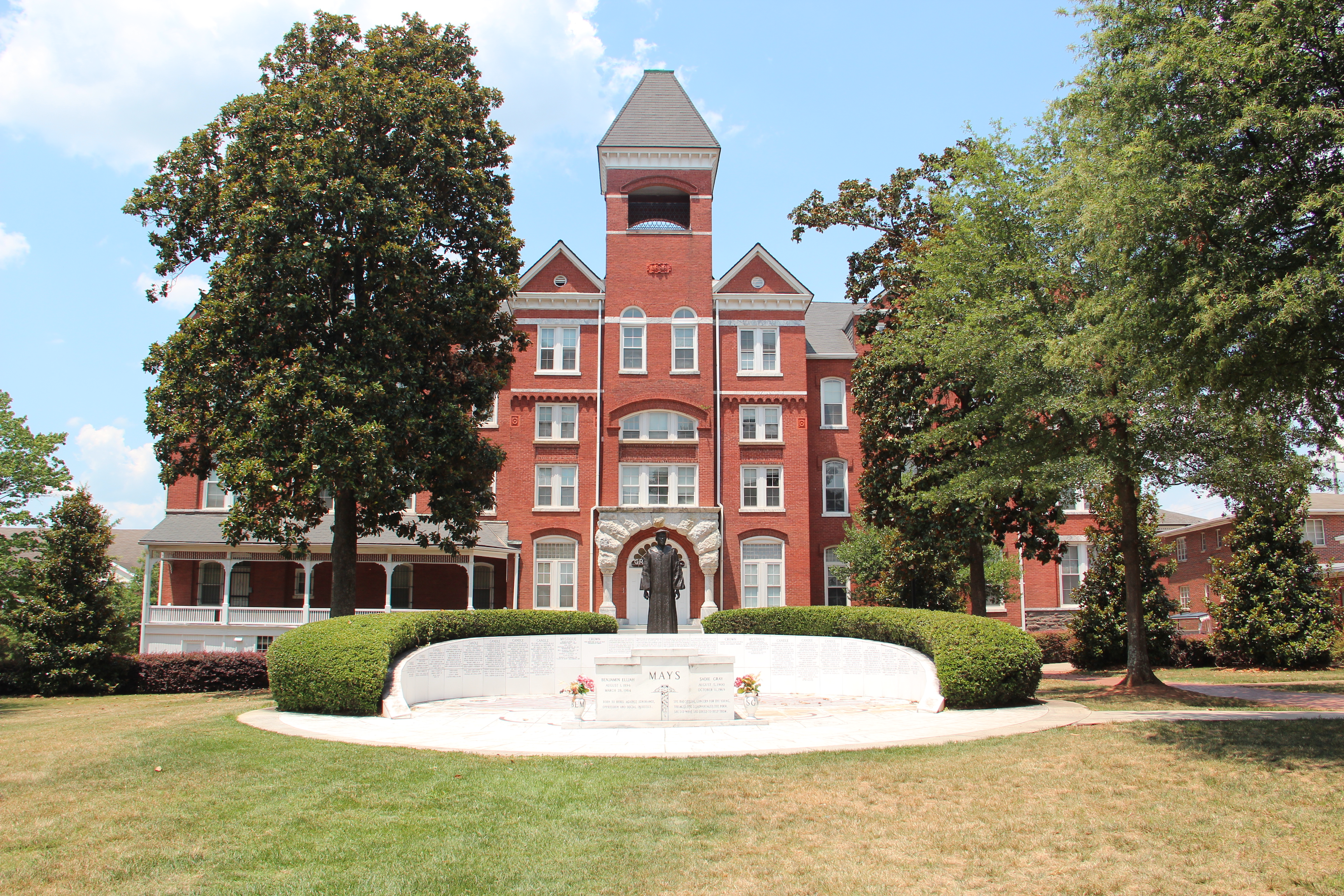
Morehouse College

- Atlanta Metropolitan State College
- Carver College
- Chamberlain College of Nursing
- Herzing College
- Morehouse College
- Morris Brown College
- Evangeline Booth College (The Salvation Army)
- Savannah College of Art and Design (Atlanta campus)
- Spelman College

=== Community and technical colleges ===
- Atlanta Technical College
- Grady Health System Professional Schools

== Neighboring cities and towns ==
=== Universities and graduate institutions ===
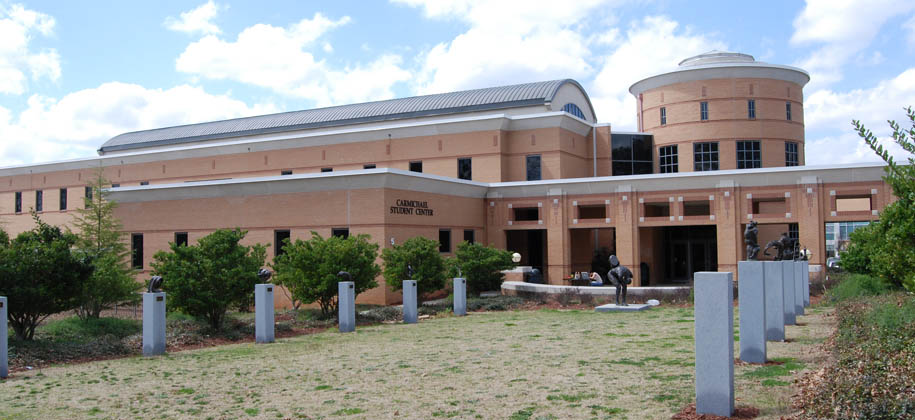
Kennesaw State University

- Brenau University (Fairburn)
- Brenau University (Gainesville)
- Brenau University (Norcross)
- Clayton State University (Morrow)
- Columbia Theological Seminary (Decatur)
- Kennesaw State University (Kennesaw)
- Life University (Marietta)
- Luther Rice College & Seminary (Lithonia)
- Oglethorpe University (Brookhaven)
- Philadelphia College of Osteopathic Medicine (Georgia campus) (Suwanee)
- University of Georgia (Gwinnett Campus) (Lawrenceville); (Main Campus) (Athens)
- University of North Georgia (multiple campuses north of Atlanta)
- University of West Georgia (Carrollton)

=== Colleges ===
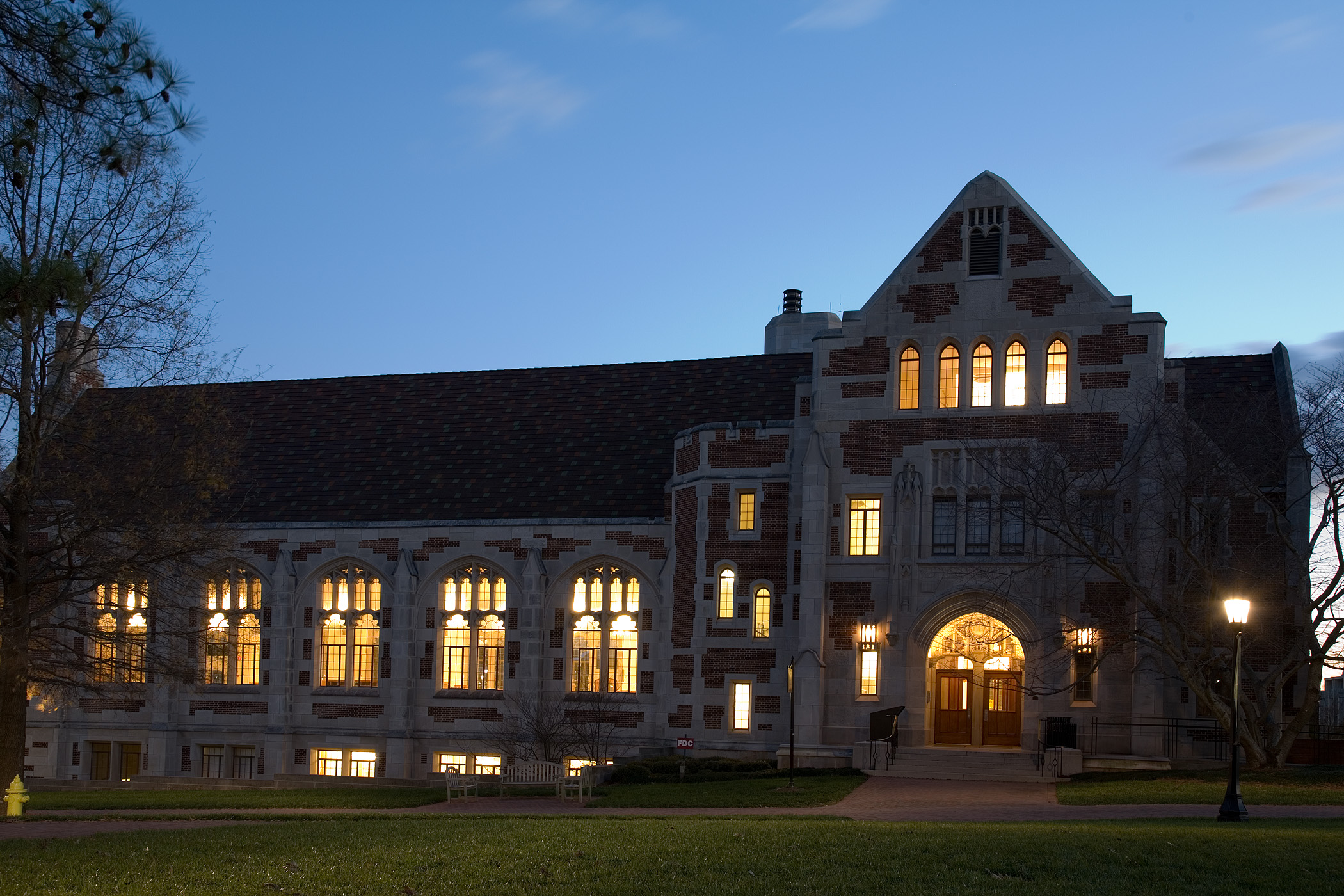
Agnes Scott College

- Agnes Scott College (Decatur)
- Ashworth College (Norcross)
- Georgia Gwinnett College (Lawrenceville)
- Oxford College (Oxford)
- Point University (West Point)

=== Community and technical colleges ===
- Chattahoochee Technical College (Marietta)
- Perimeter College at Georgia State University (Decatur)
- Georgia Piedmont Technical College (Clarkston)
- Gwinnett College (Lilburn)
- Gwinnett College - Sandy Springs (Sandy Springs)
- Gwinnett Technical College (Lawrenceville)

== See also ==
- List of colleges and universities in Georgia (U.S. state)
