= Health First Europe =

Non-profit organization

- Type: European association
- Industry: Health
- Founded: 2004
- Headquarters: Brussels, Belgium
- Revenue: 210,000 euro (2020)
- Website: http://www.healthfirsteurope.org

Health First Europe (HFE) is a non-profit, non-commercial alliance of patients, healthcare workers, academics and healthcare experts, and the medical technology industry. It aims to ensure equitable access to modern, innovative, and reliable medical technology for all European citizens. The organization works together with all health stakeholders at the European level. HFE is based in Brussels and has 20 member organizations and 10 individual members.

HFE is a registered AISBL with Belgian authorities.

== Core messages ==
Health First Europe promotes four core beliefs:

- There are weaknesses in European healthcare systems; a rethink is required to meet current and future health challenges.
- Patients and clinicians should have equitable access to modern, innovative, reliable medical technology.
- The development of new and flexible modes of healthcare delivery will benefit both patients and healthcare providers.
- "Health equals wealth." Health is a productive economic factor in terms of employment, innovation, and economic growth.

== Members ==
=== Organisations ===
- EFCCA - European Federation of Crohn's and Ulcerative Colitis Associations
- EIWH – European Institute of Women's’ Health
- EPF – European Patients Forum
- IAPO – International Association of Patients Organisations
- IDF-Europe - International Diabetes Federation – Europe
- EBIS - European Brain Injury Society
- EFORT - European Federation of National Associations of Orthopaedics and Traumatology
- EHTEL - European Health Telematics Society
- EMA – European Medical Association
- ESC - European Society of Cardiology
- EUROFEDOP - European Federation of Public Service Employees Unions
- ISFR - International Society for Fracture Repair
- UEHP - European Union of Private Hospitals
- MTG - The Medical Technology Group
- Aktion Meditech
- Eucomed – European Medical Technology Industry Association
- European Academy of Science and Arts
- European Institute of Medicine
- Institute for Health Economics
- ISO - International Organization for Standardization

=== Associate Member Organisations ===
- EFN – European Federation of Nurses Associations

=== Individual Members ===
- Prof. Dr. Günter Neubauer – Professor of Economics and Social Policy, University of the Bundeswehr, Germany
- Prof. Dr. David Williams – Professor of Tissue Engineering and Head of the Department of Clinical Engineering, University of Liverpool, United Kingdom
- Prof. Dr. Martin Fried - Head of the Clinical Centre for Minimally Invasive Surgery and Bariatric Surgery ISCARE Hospital and Professor of Surgery at the Charles University in Prague; founding member of the International Federation for the Surgery of Obesity (IFSO); and member of the Executive Board of the Czech Obesity Society
- Prof. Elias Mossialos - Professor of Health Policy and co-director of the Health and Social Care Department, London School of Economics and Political Science, United Kingdom
- Joseph Putzeys – European Commission, DG Enterprise, Advisor hours classes
- Michael Holman - Journalist and Parkinson’s Disease sufferer
- Carlo Ramponi - Head Responsible for Quality in the Lombardia Region and Managing Director of Joint Commission International
- Dr. Thomas Meyer - University of Hamburg, Germany; expert on Chlamydia
- Judy Birch - Chair of an independent support group for endometriosis and pelvic pain patients; founding member of the Endometriosis All Party Parliamentary Group in the UK and of the European Endometriosis Alliance
- Sebastian Rohde - Advisor
