= Shira Kuperman-Segal =

Israeli medical activist and patient-rights advocate

Shira Kuperman-Segal (Hebrew: שירה קופרמן-סגל; née Linivker; August 31, 1972) is an Israeli NGO founder, medical activist and patient-rights advocate. In 2015 she co-founded Halasartan (Hebrew: Stop Cancer), an Israeli organization that provides support for young-adult cancer patients.

== Career ==
Kuperman-Segal graduated from the Open University of Israel with a degree in Social Sciences, while serving in the IDF. She later served as the spokesperson of the Israeli Ministry of Defense As such, she was involved with the political implications of the erection of the Israeli West Bank barrier and was involved in Israeli Knesset discussions of the Comptroller Committee. She was a correspondent for Israel's News 10.

She is the former CEO of the Israeli NGO Tal Center, which offers integrative medicine to Israeli patients of all ages. In a meeting with President Reuven Rivlin, Kuperman's said that research should extend "to diagnose problems, focus resources and provide complementary services in the fields of welfare, employment and housing" for cancer patients.

In 2022 she served on Israel's Ministry of Health's board for the Award for Promoters of Rights in the Healthcare System. She was involved in the legislation of Israeli laws concerning patient rights, primarily in the field of loans and leave days. Kuperman held several positions in the Ministry of Defense: in the IDF Widows and Orphans Division, as well as in the Rehabilitation Division.

== Activism ==
Halasartan: In 2015 Kuperman met Zohar Yakobson, whose daughter, Tal, died of cancer at age 26. Kuperman was appalled by the conditions which Tal underwent, including misdiagnosis, bureaucratic difficulties and a deep feeling of loneliness. Together, the two decided to found an organization that would aid young-adult cancer patients. The coined name Halasartan derived from the Hebrew slang: חלאס or "stop" and the Hebrew word for "cancer" (סרטן).

Kuperman began working with cancer patients, learning first hand of their day-to-day struggles and their unique needs. According to the European Society for Medical Oncology, the organization serves young patients with cancer among the ages 18–45 years, through its large-scale operations. The NGO assists mostly patients with breast cancer, genitourinary, hematological malignancies, melanoma, lymphoma, colorectal cancer, and leukemia, among others. The community offered by the program enables patients to alleviate their "sense of seclusion" and "reduce anxiety." Soon after its establishment, the organization's digital community reached over 30,000 participants. External surveys show that patients consider the network not only as a reliable source for medical information, but also for 'patient mentoring' of newly diagnosed members by cancer survivors.

National Oncologic Nursing Curriculum: Kuperman identified eight unique needs of young cancer patients: sexuality and sexual performance, fertility, romantic relationships, young parenthood, physical rehabilitation, education and employment, recognition and rights, and loneliness and depression. She led a research team to explore these eight needs, which in turn became a report. The report was aimed at changing "the popular perception that cancer patients are the sole responsibility of medical professionals, providing a greater role for the community."

Following the report and the decision of the Ministry of Health, the overall nursing education program in the field of oncology was updated and revised. A new curriculum unit was written primarily focused on Kuperman's report. The new position became a part of a national program of clinics focused on young-adult oncological patients. The report, in turn, helped the Israeli healthcare system "improve its services." Following the report, the Israeli Ministry of Health founded a committee to investigate the shortcomings described in Kuperman's report. The committee recognized the need for the establishment of a new medical role within the healthcare system: a nurse specialized on the needs of young-adult cancer patients. A certification program was created by the Ministry of Health for such specialized nurses. Kuperman advocated for the report to be read "in depth," and for its information to be disseminated throughout the medical world. The report was also aimed at encouraging research into the biology of cancer, specifically in young patients. Kuperman also warned about the side effects of the anti-cancer treatment in young people which must be examined with its long term effects.

She advocated for special training for medical staff dedicated to young cancer patients. She warned about the post-trauma of cancer patient survivors who recovered from the physical aspects of the disease and yet are emotionally scarred.

Accelerator for Initiatives in the Field of Cancer Study: Noting the unique needs of cancer patients, Kuperman founded the Accelerator for Initiatives in the Field of Cancer Study. The Accelerator brings together doctors, nurses, high-tech entrepreneurs and various professionals in developing new initiatives and inventions in the field of oncology.

Joint council of doctors and patients: Kuperman advocated for the creation of a "customized supportive system" providing access to the full spectrum of psychosocial assistance to patients. She created a joint council of doctors and patients at the hospital. The council is held periodically to discuss and design the healthcare program with the patients themselves suggesting improvements.

Israeli Legislation: Kuperman cooperated with Israel's Ministry of Transportation on bettering the status of cancer patients and recognizing their unique needs. She solicited the support of former Israeli President Reuven Rivlin to support young cancer survivors. As part of her legislative efforts, Kuperman advocated a change in the manner in which the Israeli Government assists recovering cancer patients. She called to amend the Israeli "Sal Shikum" (a governmental support program) so that it would target young cancer patients, involve professional workshops, and further assist in the return of patients to the workforce, with cooperation from the National Insurance Institute of Israel.

Israel Mortgage Reform: Kuperman advocated for recognition of what she called the "enormous challenges" of young-adult cancer patients. In Israel, 60% of young cancer survivors are not hired back to work. In addition, due to life insurance policies, young cancer survivors are not eligible for mortgage. Kuperman launched a national campaign to raise awareness and to change legislation. According to Kuperman, "those who recover are discriminated against by the state twice - they are no longer entitled to a disability allowance from the National Insurance Institution, nor are they eligible for a mortgage." Kuperman demanded for the status-quo to be amended, stating that "those who won this battle [of cancer] are entitled to return to the arena of the living." She joined hands with Israeli Knesset member Karine Elharrar to amend the legislation that existed at the time. As a result, a new legislation was passed in the Israeli Knesset, forbidding refusal of mortgage to the disabled.

Activism for cancer survivors: In 2021 Kuperman wrote for the Israeli Globes Magazine regarding the state of affairs of cancer patients. She lamented the current situation of patients being "illogical and harmful," and wrote that Israel "must act to change it". She called young cancer patients the "transparent population", moreso due to COVID-19. She called for equal rights for cancer survivors in the workforce. Kuperman criticized the current treatment of young cancer patients, who are treated along elderly patients, as "absurd", due to the fundamental difference between the groups, beginning from their social status, their mental and emotional needs, and their hormonal and biological systems. Kuperman urged change and recognition for cancer patients in the young-adult category. She called for "decision makers and the healthcare system to adapt to the new world and recognize them and their unique needs as a separate category."

Creator of clinics: Kuperman established dedicated clinics in hospitals with large oncological centers for young adults. She worked with the Rambam Hospital in Haifa, to establish a clinic dedicated to young-adult cancer patients.

Following the monitoring of the program at Rambam and Sheba hospitals, Kuperman also founded the young-adult oncology clinic at the Tel Aviv Sourasky Medical Center. Other clinics she helped established include the Sheba Medical Center in Tel HaShomer and the Rabin Medical Center in Petah Tikva. The clinics serve as a fertile ground for international research in the field of oncology.

Recognition and awards: In 2019 Kuperman launched a creative campaign raising awareness for the manner in which cancer "halts" the life of young-adults. The campaign included television and live performances "halting" for a few seconds in order to show solidarity with young cancer patients. Within the realm of advertising campaigns and guerilla marketing, the creativity of the campaign was recognized internationally. In 2020 the Halasartan Association was awarded the international Zusman-Joint Prize for excellence in the development of social services. The NGO was recognized for creating solutions for an international index of health systems known as "Unmet Needs for Health Care." According to the prize committee, the association "seeks to change the popular perception that cancer patients are the sole responsibility of medical professionals, providing a greater role for the community. This, in turn, helps the health care system improve its services." Kuperman won the prize for "Responding to Loneliness and Mental Health Issues arising from Social Distance and Isolation."
