= Cable cars in Haifa =

Cable cars in Haifa may refer to two cable car systems in Haifa, Israel

- Rakavlit – a public-transportation aerial tramway in the southeastern part of the city, which ascends from Mifratz public transit hub to the University of Haifa and the Technion.
- Bat Galim cable car – a tourist-oriented cable car system that runs up Mount Carmel from the Bat Galim promenade in the western part of the city
