= Bat Galim =

Neighbourhood of Haifa, Israel

Bat Galim בת גלים
- Neighborhood
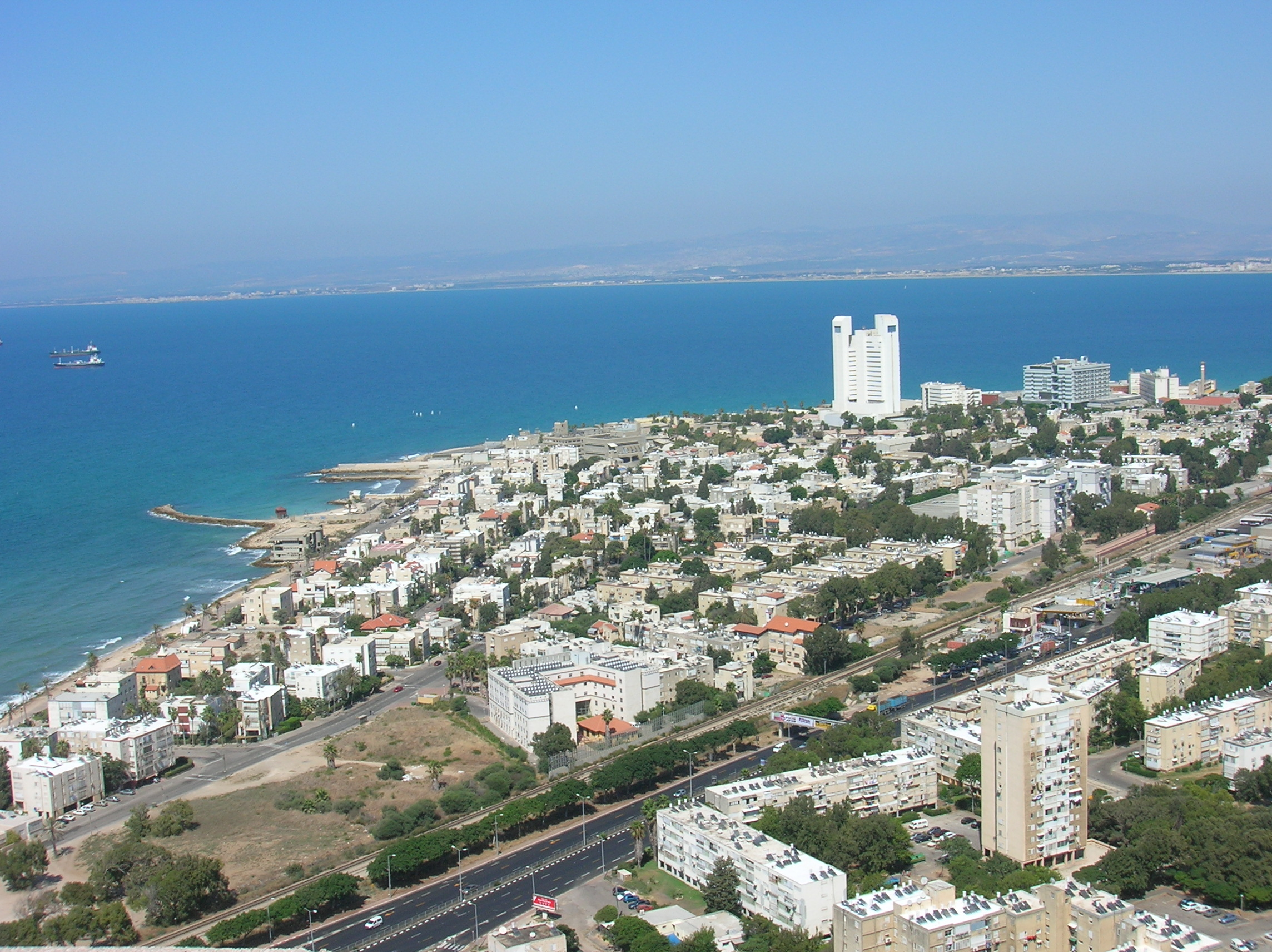
- View of Bat Galim
- Interactive map of Bat Galim
- Coordinates: 32°50′2.08″N 34°58′54.17″E
- Country: Israel
- District: H̱efa
- City: Haifa

Bat Galim (Hebrew: בת גלים, lit. Daughter of the Waves) is a neighborhood in Haifa, Israel, located at the foot of Mount Carmel on the Mediterranean coast. Bat Galim is known for its promenade and sandy beaches. The neighborhood spans from Rambam hospital in the North to the Haifa Cable Cars in the South, and from the Mediterranean Sea's shore line in the West to Bat Galim's train station on the East.

== History ==
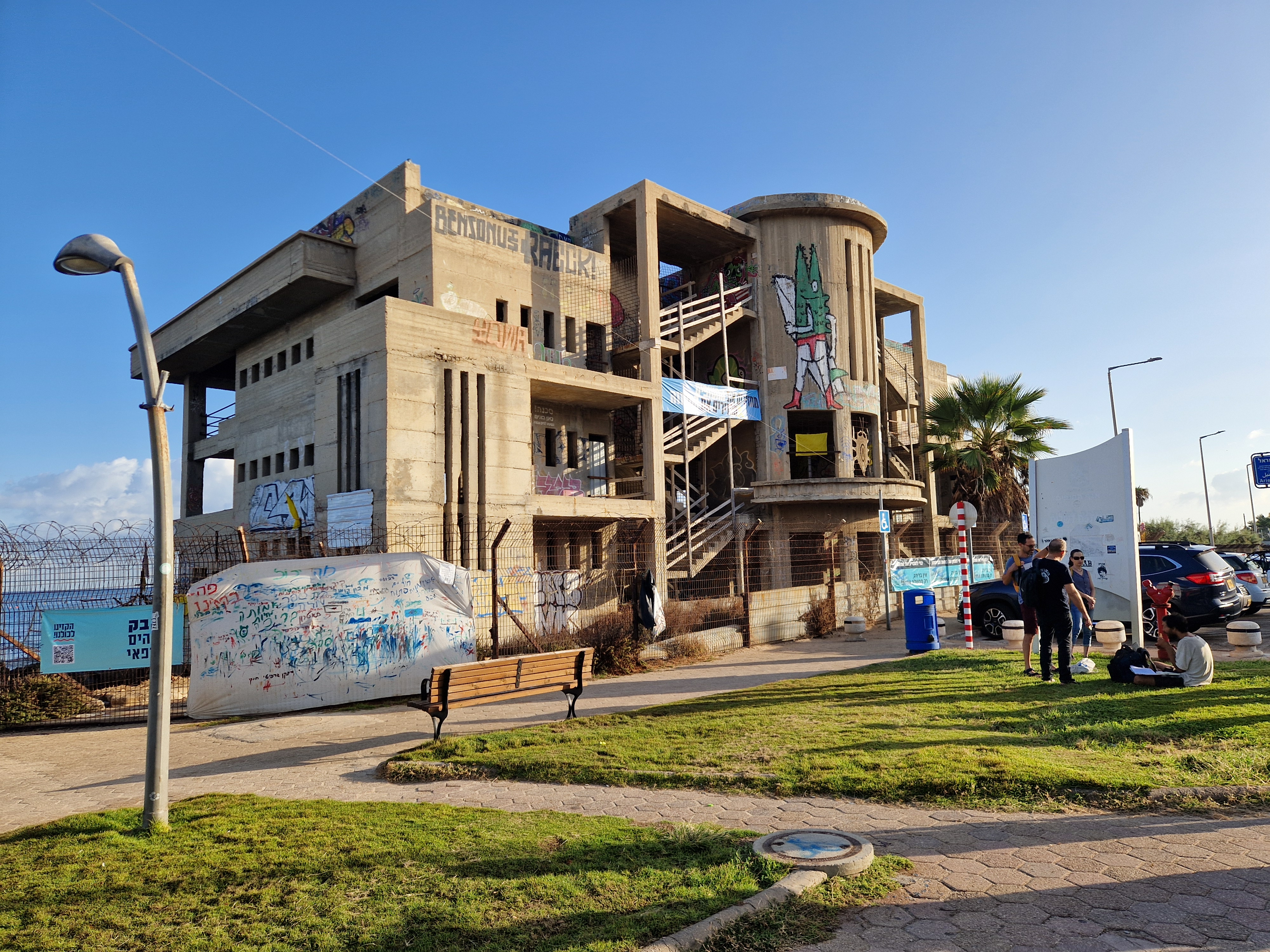
The Bat Galim `Casino` building in September 2024, covered in graffiti.

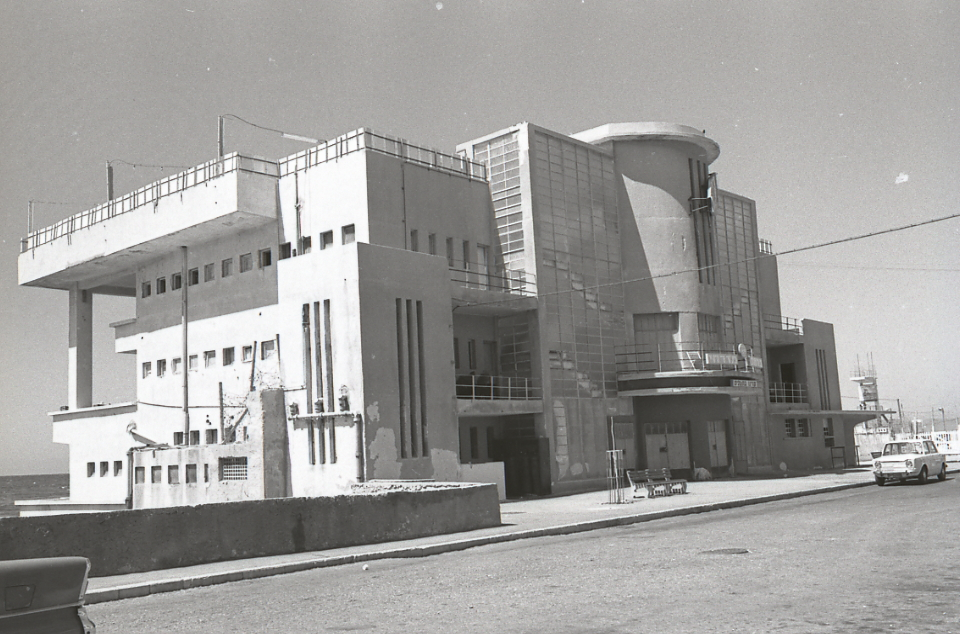
The Bat Galim `casino`, 1966

Bat Galim was the first point of Jewish settlement in modern Haifa. The neighborhood was established in the 1920s as a garden suburb of private homes designed by the Bauhaus architect Richard Kauffmann. During the British Mandate, Bat Galim was Haifa's entertainment center. The "Casino," a landmark building on the Bat Galim promenade, housed a cafe patronized by British officers, although it was never used for gambling. It was also the center of water sports in the country, and a swimming pool was built there. Activity at the Bat Galim "Casino" declined over the years until, in the early 1990s, it was demolished, and construction began on a building resembling the original structure. However, due to the developer’s bankruptcy, the project was halted, leaving the casino building unfinished. In 2011, Gil Dankner purchased the site and, together with the Haifa Municipality, attempted to develop a hotel in its place. In 2024, plans for adding floors and constructing a hotel in place of the Casino were revealed to the public. This led to public opposition, particularly among Haifa residents and Bat Galim locals, due to the impact on the Casino Pool.

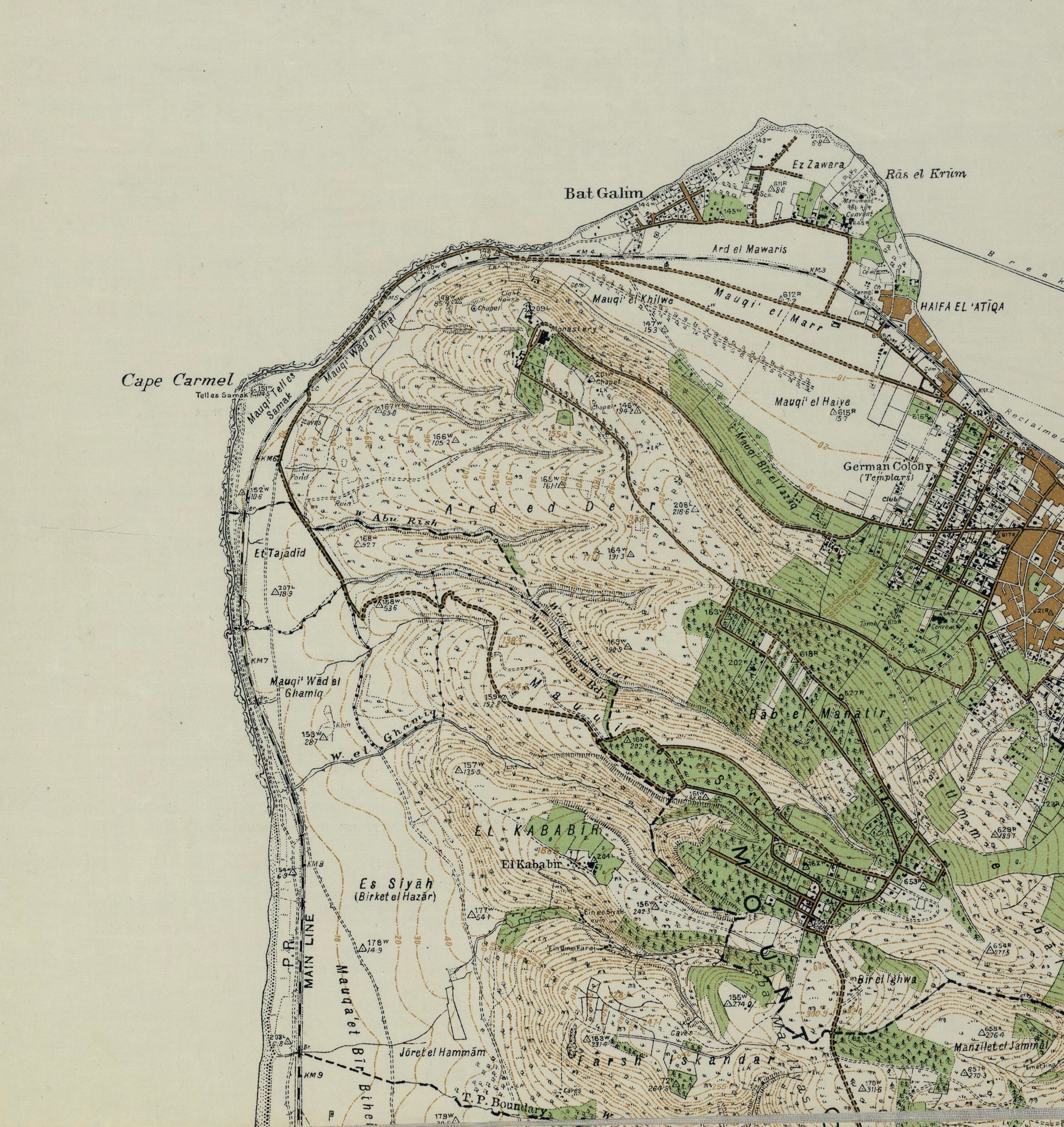
Bat Galim 1932 1:20,000

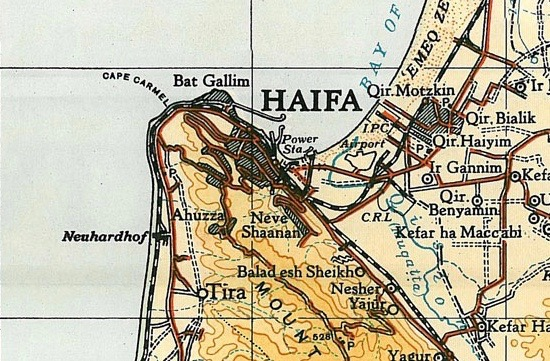
Bat Galim 1945 1:250,000

== Landmarks ==
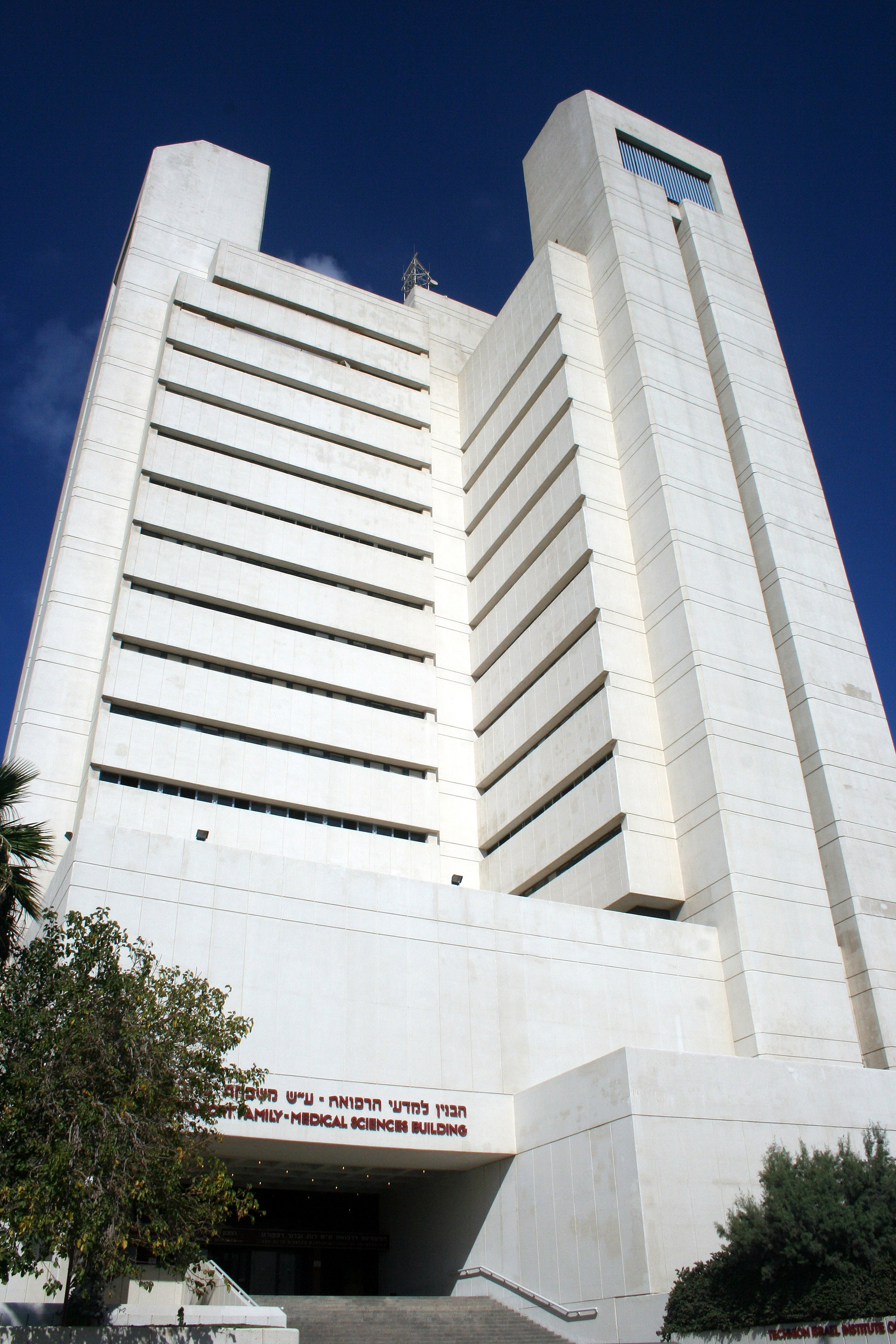
Rappaport Faculty of Medicine

Rambam Medical Center, the Technion's Faculty of Medicine and the Rappaport Family Institute for Research in the Medical Sciences are situated in the north of Bat Galim, near the shore. Bat Galim and nearby neighborhoods are served by the Haifa Bat Galim railway station. Bat Galim is the lower station of the Haifa Cable Car, which runs up and down the Carmel from Stella Maris.

== Demographics ==
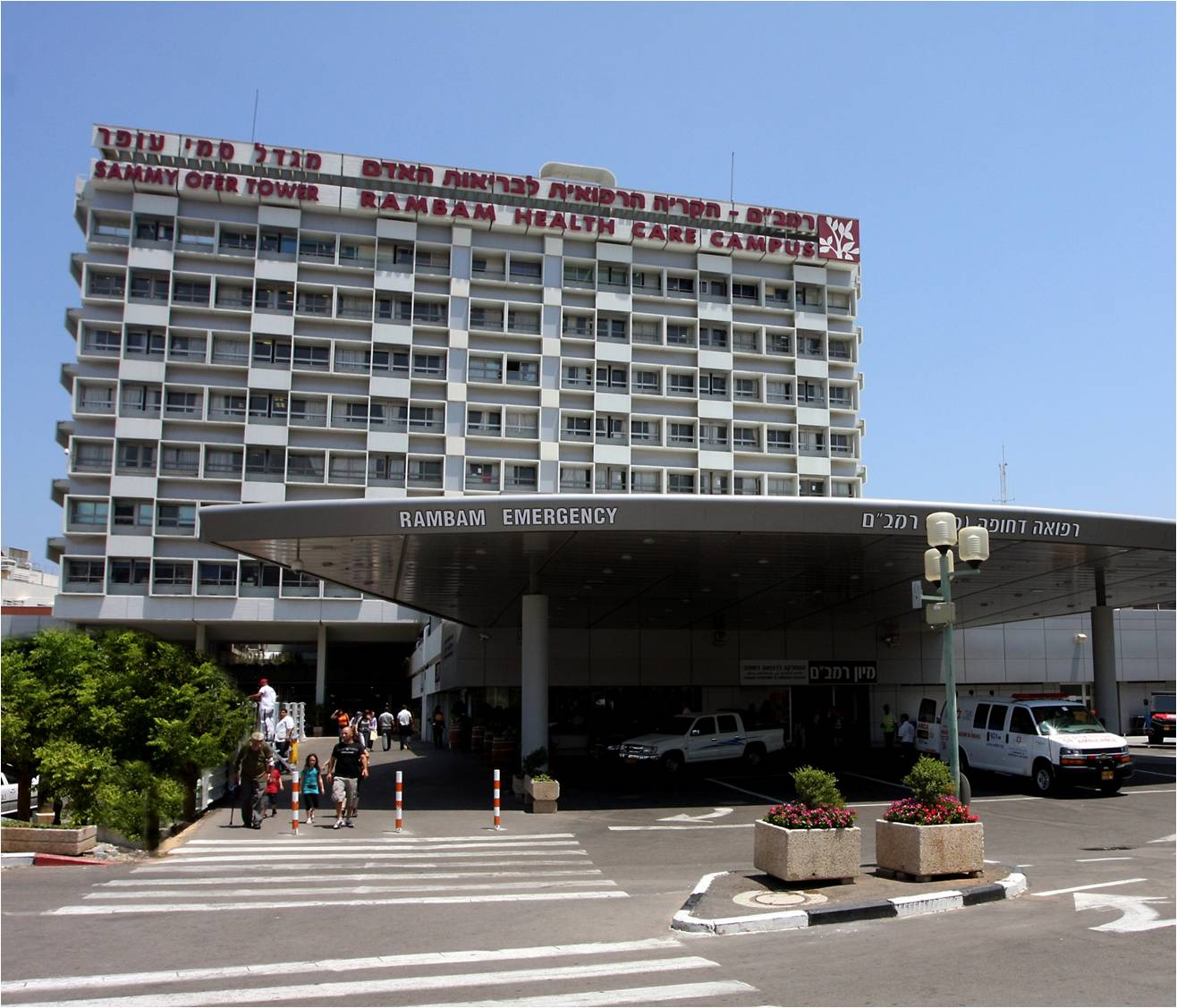
Rambam Hospital

Bat Galim is a neighborhood consisting of families from various nationalities and socio-economic backgrounds, including Jewish families who resided there prior to World War II, elderly residents, immigrants from the former Soviet Union, and Christian and Muslim minorities. In recent years, medical students, both native and international, have moved to the area to study and intern at Rambam Hospital. The neighborhood has a community of artists and artisans who hold an annual event in September, opening their homes to display and sell crafts such as pottery, glass art, jewelry, photographs, and paintings of the neighborhood. The event attracts visitors from across the country and includes live music, children's activities, lectures, architectural tours, and an address by the Mayor of Haifa.

== Beach and surfing ==
Bat Galim is a popular location for surfers, including wave, wind and kite surfing, year round, with many international competitions taking place there. Among the surfers, there are many swimmers, with three supervised beaches along the shore including the popular "Lagoona" beach specifically for swimmers and the "Backdoor" beach for wave surfers. More recently, many new SUP, stand up paddle board enthusiasts have joined in the neighborhood's water sports.
