= Halasartan =

Israeli NGO providing support for oncology patients

- חלאסרטן
- Formation: 2016; 10 years ago
- Type: Non-Governmental Organization
- Headquarters: Israel
- Services: Support for young oncology patients
- Methods: Digital community, mentoring, in-person clinics
- Awards: Israeli Innovation Prize (2016), Zusman-Joint Prize (2020)

Halasartan (Hebrew: חלאסרטן) or Stop Cancer is an Israeli non-governmental organization that primarily works on a voluntary basis to provide relief and support for young oncology patients. According to the European Society for Medical Oncology, the organization serves young patients with cancer among the ages 18–45 years, through its large-scale operations. The NGO targets mostly patients with breast cancer, genitourinary, haematological malignancies, melanoma, lymphoma, colorectal cancer, and leukaemia, among others. The community offered by the program enables patients to alleviate their 'sense of seclusion' and reduce anxiety.' The organization's goals are two-sided: first, to characterize the user profile of young patients with cancer, their goals and unmet needs; secondly, "to influence the attitudes of official state institutions." External surveys show that patients consider the network not only as a reliable source for medical information, but also for patient mentoring of newly diagnosed members by cancer survivors.

== History ==
In 2016, Zohar Yakobson, founder of the Israeli Tal Center for Integrative Oncology, joined hands with Shira Kuperman-Segal, to establish an appropriate "solution or response for young people with cancer." According to Yakobson, there was "a framework for children and a framework for adults – but what about someone who is at the height of their life, studying, [...] and suddenly thrust into a hospital with no framework for people of that age."

The new venture was named Halasartan (also transcribed as HalaSartan), derived from the Hebrew: חלאס or "stop" and the Hebrew: סרטן or "cancer." The target patients were mostly served via social media, due to their age and their easy access to digital media and online materials.

Soon after its establishment its digital community reached over 25,000 participants. The NGO, supported by Merck Sharp & Dohme (MSD), assisted young cancer patients in dating and social interactions. The community focused on "starting conversations that can be difficult or uncomfortable, trying to remove the element of embarrassment" associated with cancer.

Later, Halasartan also began approaching community members who have survived cancer, asking them to become mentors for recently diagnosed young cancer patients. As a result of internal surveys conducted by members of the Halasartan community, the need arose to create a meeting between new patients and members of the community who are cancer survivors, which led to the creation of the in-person, face-to-face programs.

== Onsite programs ==
After the success of their digital community, and after studying the various unmet needs and unique challenges of young cancer patients, Halasartan established dedicated clinics in hospitals with large oncological centers for young adults. This included the Rambam Hospital in Haifa, with a dedicated staff, including cancer survivors offering mentoring and support to new patients. The role of these Halasartan community cancer-survivors was to assist new patients with using the digital tools provided by the program. The tools were customized to provide most benefit for patients' individual needs.

In addition to mentoring, the in-person clinics also aimed at identifying barriers to counseling across the hospital units and services. Multidisciplinary in nature, the clinics offered patients assistance with emotional distress surrounding the illness, addressing issues like fertility preservation, hormonal effects and early menopause, sexual functioning, and rehabilitation, as well as psychosocial needs like coping with young parenthood, new relationships, loneliness, and returning to work. Unlike other oncological departments serving cancer patients of all ages, the young adults' clinic programs began focusing on "preserving fertility, offering guidance and making these issues a priority." Fertility had been found to be a subject of high importance for young, especially female, cancer patients.

Following the success of the Halasartan clinic at the Rambam Hospital in Haifa, the Sheba Medical Center in Ramat Gan contacted Halasartan, proposing that a similar clinic be established at the Ramat Gan hospital. At this new clinic site within Sheba, the focus was on ensuring an holistic approach to patient well-being, with highly individualized programs. Such a "customized supportive system" meant providing access to the full spectrum of psychosocial assistance to patients. The social, physical, and emotional aspects of recovery and reintegration are supported. This full spectrum support means services to assist with patients' occupational, physical or cognitive rehabilitation. Emotional health might need support around interpersonal relationships, sexuality, and body image. For young adults who have undergone cancer treatments, counseling and treatments for fertility status, which may include induced premature menopause or andropause are often needed. The intent of the Sheba clinic is to offer integrated access to these, and any other, needed services. At Sheba, Halasartan initiated a young patients' council. The joint council of doctors and patients is held periodically to discuss and contribute to the design of the program's activities, with the patients themselves suggesting improvements.

Following the monitoring of the program at Rambam and Sheba hospitals, the results of the program's activities were presented to implement the program at the national level in all major hospitals throughout Israel.

== Struggle for equality for cancer survivors ==
The organization strives to acknowledge the special needs of young cancer patients as well as of cancer survivors. In Israel, 60% of young cancer survivors are not hired back to work. In addition, due to life insurance policies, young cancer survivors are not eligible for any house-funding or mortgage. Halasartan launched a national campaign to raise awareness and to change legislation, which resulted in the support of Israeli President Reuven Rivlin, who voiced his position in support of the goal.

Halasartan also labored at the national level to assist cancer patients with governmental bureaucratic procedures. Following a national campaign, a new legislation passed within the tax authority, National Insurance and the Ministry of Transportation. All cancer patients were given a unique status in all governmental offices, resulting in unique services offering expedited service and digital assistance.

== Oncological young adult clinics ==
The association operates in the largest four medical centers in Israel, and is part of the oncology network in the departments. It is distinguished by its activity in identifying actual needs at the individual and collective level, and for matching projects that provide a satisfactory response to the needs of young adults and their supporting environment.

- Rambam Health Care Campus in Haifa
- Sheba Medical Center in Tel HaShomer
- Sourasky Medical Center in Tel Aviv
- Rabin Medical Center in Petah Tikva

== Awards and achievements ==
In 2016 Halasartan was awarded the Israeli Innovation Prize by the Israeli Shivuk Association.

In 2020, in recognition of its activities, the Halasartan Association was awarded the international Zusman-Joint Prize for excellence in the development of social services. The NGO was recognized for creating solutions for an international index of health systems known as "Unmet Needs for Health Care." According to the prize committee, the association "seeks to change the popular perception that cancer patients are the sole responsibility of medical professionals, providing a greater role for the community. This, in turn, helps the health care system improve its services."

== Criticism ==
Heavily relying on communication with its patients through social media, Halasartan has been criticized for its extensive use of the medium. It was stated that its means of communication may act as a double-edged sword in the setting of uncontrolled medical information.

According to The Lancet, Halasartan "exploits" the evolving digital world. Social media may offer anonymity to its members, however it cannot replace the importance of personal medical consultation.
