= List of medical schools in Israel =

The list of medical schools in Israeli that have been granted full accreditation total six. To achieve full accreditation, medical school must complete a two-stage process, beginning with academic authorization and degree-granting authority by the Israel Council for Higher Education (COHE), followed by approval of their clinical training programs and the legal recognition of their medical degrees to practice medicine in Israel by the Israel Ministry of Health's Medical Professions Licensure Division.

== History ==
On May 17, 1949, almost one year to the day after David Ben Gurion proclaimed the Declaration of the Establishment of the State of Israel, the Hebrew University-Hadassah Medical School in Jerusalem became the first accredited medical school to open to improve access to quality health care. Over the next 75 years of its existence for similar reasons, five additional COHE-accredited Israel medical schools have opened: 1) the Gray Faculty of Medical and Health Sciences of Tel Aviv University (1964), 2) the Ruth and Bruce Rappaport Faculty of Medicine of the Technion - Israel Institute of Technology (1969), 3) the Joyce and Irving Goldman School of Medicine of the Ben-Gurion University in the Negev (1974), 4) the Azrieli Faculty of Medicine of Bar-Ilan University in Safed (2011), and 5) Dr Miriam and Sheldon Adelson School of Medicine of Ariel University (2019).

Today, Israel is experiencing a growing shortage of family physicians and specialists. Major contributing factors include the growing number of Russian physicians who made aliyah and now are reaching retirement age; physicians leaving the country or changing professions; and population growth. As a result several new medical schools are in the pipeline.

== Hebrew University Medical School: Jerusalem District (1949) ==
The Hadassah School of Medicine of the Hebrew University of Jerusalem, was first envisioned during the founding of the Hebrew University in Jerusalem in 1925, including its partnership with Hadassah, the Women's Zionist Organization of America. In 1939, Hadassah opened a hospital on Mt Scopus, led by Director Chaim Yassky, intending to open as a medical school. In April 1948, a convoy of 78 health care workers, scientists and patients, including Dr Yassky were massacred by Arab forces on Mt Scopus, and the campus cut off from Israeli West Jerusalem. Following the 1948 Arab-Israeli War, the Medical school was opened in temporary facilities in Central Jerusalem.

== Tel Aviv University Medical School: Tel Aviv District (1964) ==
The Gray Faculty of Medical and Health Sciences is a medical school affilated with Tel Aviv University (formerly the Sackler Faculty of Medicine). The Faculty of Medicine at Tel Aviv University was established in 1964 to address the shortage of physicians and clinical research facilities in central Israel. Professor Andre de Vries, an Israel Prize-winning hemotologist and physician-scientist, and head of internal medicine at Bellinson Hospital (Rabin Medical Center), served as its founding Dean.

== Technion - Israel Institute of Technology School of Medicine: Haifa District (1969) ==
The Ruth and Bruce Rappaport Faculty of Medicine, located in Haifa, is part of the Technion – Israel Institute of Technology. In the early 1960s, senior physicians at Haifa's Rambam Hospital, led by surgical pioneer Professor David Erlik, identifed a need for an academic medical school specializing in medical education and research in Northern Israel. In 1969, the medical school was established, with Professor Erlik as its founding Dean.

== Ben-Gurion University of the Negev School of Medicine: Southern District (1974) ==
In 1974, the Joyce and Irving Goldman Medical School of Ben-Gurion University of the Negev opened in Beersheba, in collaboration with Clalit Health Services and Seroka Medical Center, and with a community-oriented mandate to improve the health of the citizens of the Negev. In 2024, the Ben-Gurion University Faculty of Health Sciences celebrated 50 years of health care impact in Southern Israel.

== Bar-Ilan University School of Medicine: Northern District (2011) ==
In 2011, Bar-Ilan University Azrieli Faculty of Medicine opened Israel's fifth medical school in Safed, Northern Israel. Its purpose was to improve the quality and distribution of health care services in the upper Galilee Region.

== Ariel University School of Medicine: West Bank-Samaria (2019) ==
The Dr Miriam and Sheldon Adelsohn School of Medicine of Ariel University was accredited by Israel's COHE in April, 2018. Among the Israeli dignitaries attending the medical school's opening in August, Israeli President Reuven Rivlin and Education Minister Naftali Bennett both acknowledged the various obstacles that were surmounted in opening an institution of higher learning in a disputed territory. On October 29, 2018, the first class of 70 medical students participated in the official opening ceremony attended by the Adelsons. Among the speakers, US Ambassador to Israel, David Friedman said, "The lives of everyone in this region, whether Jewish, Christian or Muslim, they have now been improved and will continue to be improved in so many profound ways".

== Israeli medical schools in development ==
As of early 2026, three Universities have received COHE approval to open a medical school. The Reichman University Medical School in Hertziliya was approved in November 2024. The Herta and Paul Amir School of Medicine of the University of Haifa and the Gutwirth Medical School of the Weizmann Institute of Science in Rehovot were approved in February, 2025. The schools are in various stages of development, and have not completed the entire accreditation process in order to admit medical students.
