= Medtech (medical education) =

- Motto: Be extraordinary!
- Type: For-profit college
- Established: 2004
- Location: multiple locations

MedTech College was a for-profit medical career education facility founded in Indianapolis, Indiana, in 2004. In 2015 the company was acquired by LTT Enterprises and became part of Gwinnett College.

== Academics ==
MedTech College offered diploma and Associate degree programs in the fields of Medical, Medical Office, School of Nursing, and English as a Second Language. Associate degree programs can be completed in 15–18 months, and diploma programs in nine.

On August 23, 2016, Medtech ceased operations at their Lexington, Kentucky, campus and corporate officials announced that instruction would cease on the Indianapolis, Fort Wayne and Greenwood, Indiana, Medtech campuses on September 16, 2016. Medtech College LPN degrees at Indianapolis and Greenwood were the only accredited degrees at the time at closing. RN degrees were not.

== Campus locations ==
At different points in time, Medtech operated campuses in Falls Church, Virginia; Fort Wayne, Indiana; Greenwood, Indiana; Indianapolis, Indiana; Lexington, Kentucky; Silver Spring, Maryland; Morrow, Georgia; Tucker, Georgia; Atlanta, Georgia; and Washington, D.C. The Marietta-Atlanta campus is now part of Gwinnett College.
