= Rambam Maimonides Medical Journal =

- Discipline: Medicine
- Language: English
- Edited by: Shraga Blazer

Publication details
- History: 2010-present
- Publisher: Rambam Health Care Campus (Israel)
- Frequency: Quarterly
- Open access: Yes
- License: Creative Commons Attribution 3.0 License
- Impact factor: 1.5 (2022)

Standard abbreviations
- ISO 4: Rambam Maimonides Med. J.

Indexing
- ISSN: 2076-9172
- OCLC no.: 652437167

Links
- Journal homepage

Rambam Maimonides Medical Journal is a quarterly international, peer-reviewed, open access medical journal sponsored by Rambam Health Care Campus covering medical research, in the spirit of Maimonides. The journal was established in July 2010 and is led by the editor-in-chief, Shraga Blazer since then.

Rambam Maimonides Medical Journal
- Discipline: Medicine
- Language: English
- Edited by: Shraga Blazer

Publication details
- History: 2010-present
- Publisher: Rambam Health Care Campus (Israel)
- Frequency: Quarterly
- Open access: Yes
- License: Creative Commons Attribution 3.0 License
- Impact factor: 1.5 (2022)

Standard abbreviations
- ISO 4: Rambam Maimonides Med. J.

Indexing
- ISSN: 2076-9172
- OCLC no.: 652437167

Links
- Journal homepage

Rambam Maimonides Medical Journal charges no submission, publication, or subscription fees, and it is supported by donors. The journal also has a no-advertisement policy.

The journal is abstracted and indexed in PubMed Central, EBSCO Information Services, the Emerging Sources Citation Index, Scopus, Journal Citation Reports (JCR), the Directory of Open Access Journals, Cabell's Scholarly Analytics, Google Scholar, and Crossref.

The journal's first JCR impact factor (IF) of 1.2 was recorded in 2022. Its IF for 2025 has increased to 2.0. The journal holds a Q2 position in the "MEDICINE, GENERAL & INTERNAL" category, having moved up in rank from 150 out of 332 journals in 2024 to 113 out of 336 for 2025. Its Scopus CiteScore for 2025 is 2.8. The journal has published multiple articles of interest that have been cross-posted on university websites, medical societies, businesses, and more. The Rambam Maimonides Medical Journal is known in particular for publishing articles relating to Jewish ethics, Jewish law (Halakha) and medicine, controversial topics of strong potential benefit to the academic and medical communities, and the history of medicine—particularly with regard to Judaism and Jewish contributions to medicine.

== Media coverage ==
Individual articles published in the journal have received media coverage on clinical, medical ethics, and professional culture topics. Reported subjects have included medical cannabis for chronic low-back pain, deprescribing and polypharmacy among older adults, and a 2025 study of reported antisemitic and politically charged conduct at commencement ceremonies at leading United States medical schools.
