= Rafael Beyar =

Israeli cardiologist

Rafael (Rafi) Beyar
- רפי ביאר
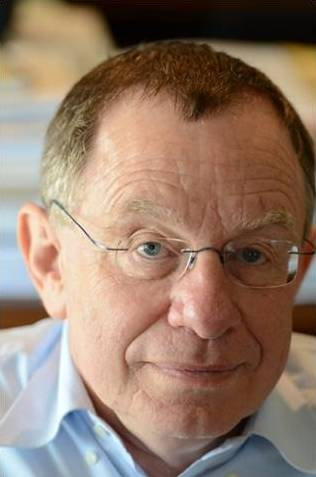
- Born: 20 January 1952 (age 74); Petah Tikva, Israel
- Education: Tel Aviv University (MD), Technion-Israel Institute of Technology (DSc), Johns Hopkins University (MPH)
- Occupations: Medical Doctor, Entrepreneur, Professor
- Known for: Director of Rambam Health Care Campus, Authority on Interventional Cardiology
- Title: Director of Rambam Health Care Campus
- Term: 1996–present

Rafael (Rafi) Beyar (Hebrew: רפי ביאר; born 20 January 1952) is an Israeli medical doctor, entrepreneur, and professor who is the eighth director of Rambam Health Care Campus since 1996. Beyar, an authority on interventional cardiology, also continues to practice in his specialty of clinical invasive cardiology. Beyar is the editor of several books related to cardiology and electrophysiology, including Frontiers in Interventional Cardiology, Proceedings from International Meetings, Analysis of Cardiac Development: from Embryo to Old Age; and co-founder of Corindus Vascular Robotics.

== Biography ==
Beyar was born in 1952 in Israel. Beyar grew up in Tel Aviv. He graduated from the School of Medicine of Tel Aviv University in 1977 (MD), the Faculty of Biomedical Engineering at the Technion-Israel Institute of Technology in 1983 (DSc), and the Bloomberg School of Public Health, Johns Hopkins University in 2008 (MPH).

== Medical career ==
In 1983, Beyar founded the Heart System Research Center at the Technion, where he served as Coordinator and Director. He completed his residency in medicine at Rambam (1983-1985) and a fellowship in cardiology at Johns Hopkins University (1985-1987). In 1996, he was appointed Professor of Biomedical Engineering and Medicine at the Technion.

He is also Director of the Division of Invasive Cardiology at Rambam since 1996, and served as visiting professor at Johns Hopkins University for several years.

=== Dean, Faculty of Medicine ===
In 1998, Beyar was elected Dean of the Rappaport Faculty of Medicine at the Technion and served for the full six-year term. Under his leadership, Professor Avram Hershko and Professor Aaron Ciechanover were awarded the Nobel Prize in Chemistry in October 2004.

=== Director General, Rambam Health Care Campus (2006-2019) ===
From 2006 to 2019, Beyar served as the Director of Rambam Health Care Campus in Haifa, Israel, the major academic hospital serving northern Israel. Beyar has helped leadership in defining Rambam's mission to create the future of medicine for humankind, with the vision of setting the highest of standards for patient care via the intertwining of medicine, technology, research, education, and humanity.

In the summer of 2006, Beyar successfully led the hospital through the second Lebanon war, when Rambam treated civilian patients as well as wounded soldiers from the frontiers while under continuous missile attack. Under his leadership, and inspired by Rambam's vision and mission, the hospital is now undergoing an enhanced medical development initiative which includes restructuring of the medical and surgical departments, and promotion of medical research including establishment of the Clinical Research Institute at Rambam and creating research programs for young clinician scientists.

Beyar is also spearheading a major development plan to bring together medicine, science, and technology for the improvement of healthcare. Rambam is now in the final construction stages for the world's largest fortified underground emergency hospital which, together with the new emergency department, will assure northern Israel's preparedness for emergency conditions. In 2014 the Ruth Rappaport Children's Hospital opened, in 2015 the Fishman Oncology Center was inaugurated, and a new cardiovascular hospital is scheduled for completion in 2016. Following government approval, construction is scheduled to begin shortly on a new Biomedical Discovery Tower which will host new innovations in medicine.

== Research and awards ==
Beyar has received several prizes over the course of his career, including the Taub Prize for excellence in Research in 1999, and the Michelle Mirowski Award for Accomplishments in Cardiovascular Medicine, from the Israeli Heart Association in 2002. In 2005 he was nominated for the Johns Hopkins Society of Scholars for his worldwide contribution to cardiovascular science and for establishing the Technion-Johns Hopkins Collaboration Program on Biomedical Sciences and Engineering.

Beyar's research and clinical interests range from mathematical simulation to imaging and analysis of the cardiovascular system, and to the development of stents and new technologies in cardiology. He developed the first robotic catheterization system in the world which was subsequently approved by the United States Food and Drug Administration (FDA) and is now used in clinical practice. He has authored over 220 scientific publications and 15 books, is the founding editor of Acute Cardiac Care Journal, endorsed by the European Society of Cardiology, and is organizer and founder of leading professional cardiovascular meetings combining basic cardiovascular research, clinical cardiology and cardiovascular innovations.

== Books ==
1. Sideman S, Beyar R, Eds. Simulation and Imaging of the Cardiac System. State of the Heart: Proceedings of the First Henry Goldberg Workshop, Haifa, Israel, March 4–7, 1984. Martinus Nijhoff Publ, The Hague, 1985.
2. Sideman S, Beyar R, Eds. Activation Metabolism and Perfusion of the Heart: Proceedings of the Third Henry Goldberg Workshop, Piscataway, NJ, April, 1986. Martinus Nijhoff Publ. The Hague, 1987.
3. Sideman S, Beyar R, Eds. Simulation and Control of the Cardiac System: Proceedings of the Second Henry Goldberg Workshop, Haifa, Israel, April, 1985. CRC Press, Boca Raton FL, Vols. I, II, III, 1987.
4. Sideman S, Beyar R, Eds. Analysis and Simulation of the Cardiac System—Ischemia: Proceedings of the 4th Henry Goldberg Workshop, Tiberias, Israel, May, 1987. CRC Press, Boca Raton, FL, 1989.
5. Sideman S, Beyar R, Eds. Imaging, Analysis and Simulation of the Cardiac System: Proceedings of the 5th Henry Goldberg Workshop, Cambridge, UK, May, 1988. Freund Publishers, London, 1990.
6. Sideman S, Beyar R, Eds. Imaging, Measurement and Analysis of the Heart: Proceedings of the 6th Henry Goldberg Workshop, Eilat, Israel, Dec. 3–7, 1989. Hemisphere Publishing Co, NY, 1991.
7. Sideman S, Beyar R, Kléber A, Eds. Cardiac Electrophysiology, Circulation and Transport: Proceedings of the 7th Henry Goldberg Workshop, Berne, Switzerland, May 13–17, 1990. Kluwer Academic Publ, MA, 1991.
8. Sideman S, Beyar R, Eds. Interactive Phenomena in the Cardiac System: Proceedings of the 8th Henry Goldberg Workshop, Bethesda, MD, Dec. 6–10, 1992. Plenum Press, NY, 1993.
9. Sideman S, Beyar R, Eds. Molecular and Subcellular Cardiology: Effects of Structure and Function: Proceedings of the 9th Henry Goldberg Workshop, Haifa, Israel, Dec. 4–8, 1994. Plenum Press, NY, 1995.
10. Beyar R, Keren G, Leon M, Serruys P, Eds. Frontiers in Interventional Cardiology. Martin Dunitz Publ., London, 1997.
11. Sideman S, Beyar R, Eds. Analytical and Quantitative Cardiology: From Genetics to Function; Proceedings of the 10th Henry Goldberg Workshop, Haifa, Israel, Dec. 2–5, 1996. Plenum Press, NY, 1997.
12. Sideman S, Beyar R, Eds. Cardiac Engineering: From Genes & Cells to Structure & Function. Ann N Y Acad Sci, vol. 1015, 2004.
13. Sideman S, Beyar R, Landesberg A, Eds. The Communicative Cardiac Cell. Ann N Y Acad Sci, vol 1047, 2005. ISBN 978-1-57331-547-0.
14. Sideman S, Beyar R, Landesberg A, Eds. Control and Regulation of Transport Phenomena in the Cardiac System. Ann N Y Acad Sci, vol. 1123, 2008.
15. Beyar R, Landesberg A, Eds. Analysis of Cardiac Development: From Embryo to Old Age. Ann N Y Acad Sci, vol. 1188, 2010.
