= Rambam Health Care Campus =

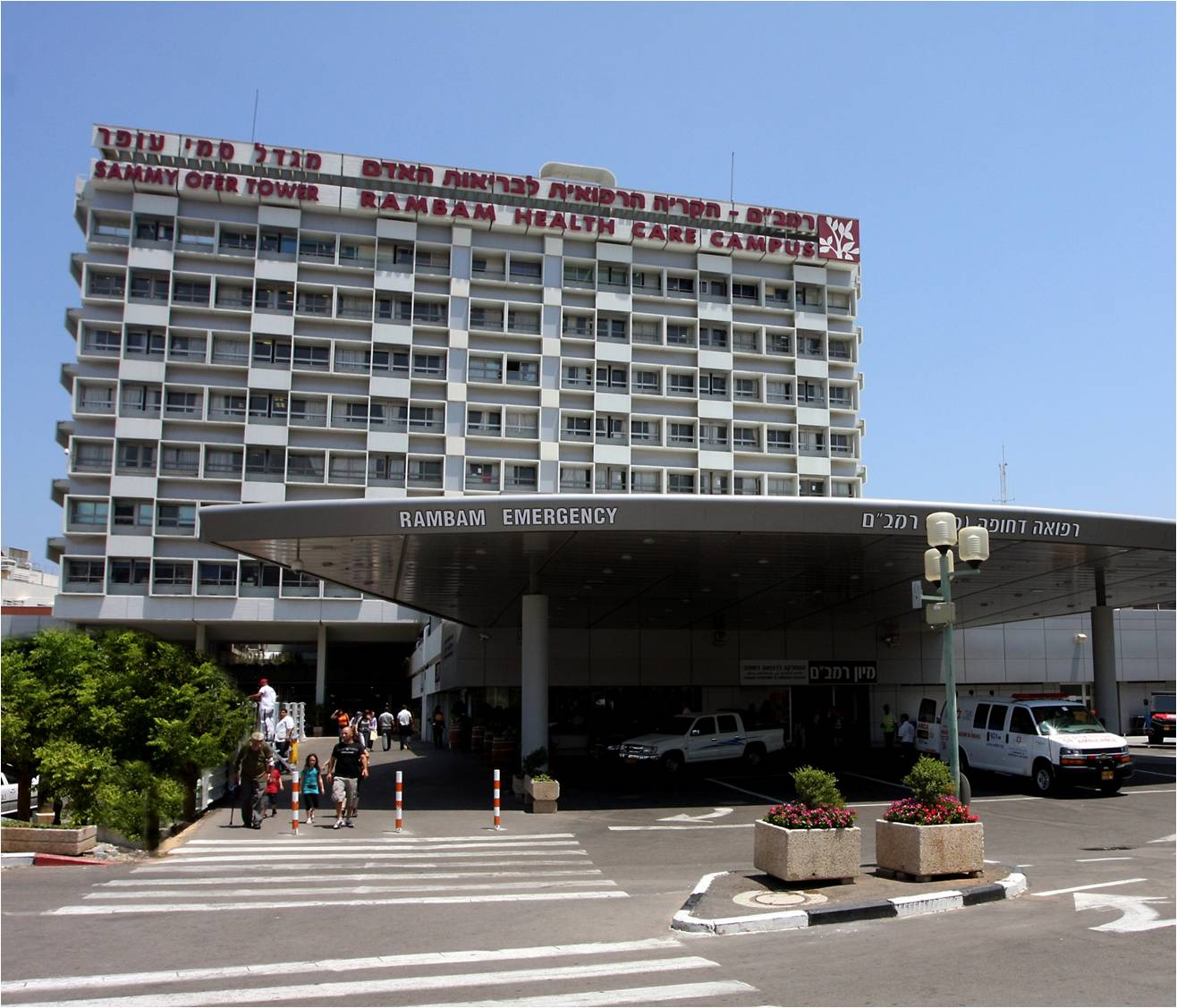
- Emergency center of the Rambam Health Care Campus

Geography
- Location: Haifa, Israel
- Coordinates: 32°50′00″N 34°59′09″E

Organisation
- Type: district general, teaching
- Affiliated university: Technion – Israel Institute of Technology

Services
- Emergency department: Yes
- Beds: 1040

Helipads
- Helipad: Yes

History
- Founded: 1938

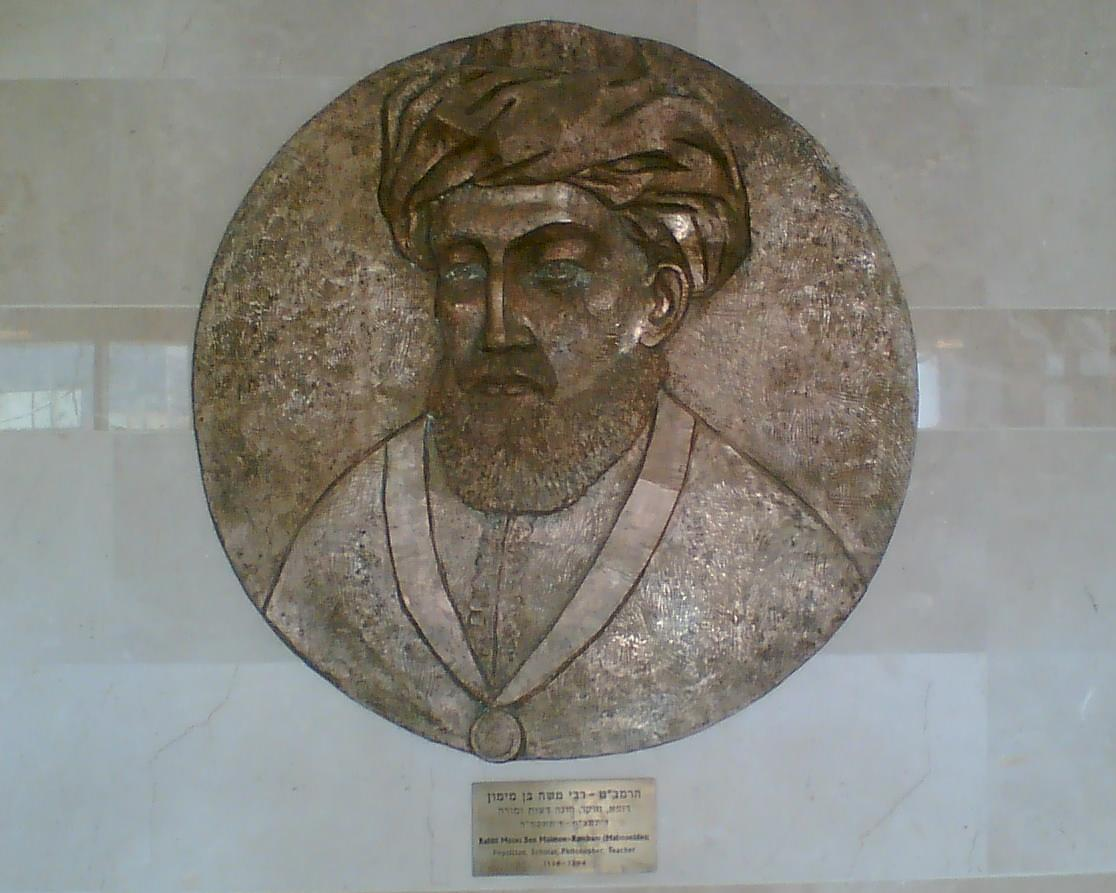
Plaque of Maimonides, Rambam Hospital

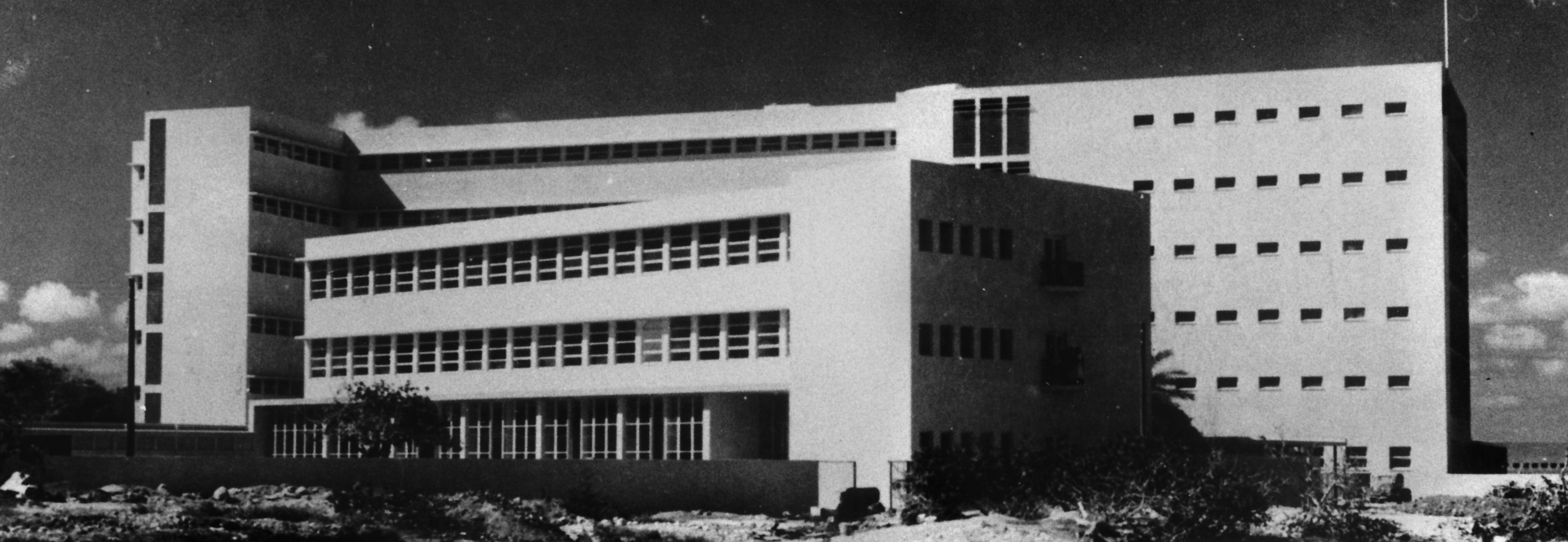
Palestinian Government Hospital of Haifa, 1938

Rambam Health Care Campus (Hebrew: רמב"ם – הקריה הרפואית לבריאות האדם) commonly called Rambam Hospital, is a teaching hospital in the Bat Galim neighborhood of Haifa, Israel. Rambam Health Care Campus is a part of Tertiary Referral Center for Northern Israel. There was a makeshift hospital founded in 1918, and the permanent hospital was founded in 1938.

It is the largest medical center in northern Israel and fifth largest in Israel, and is named for the 12th century physician-philosopher Maimonides, known as Rambam.

Rambam Health Care Campus is also an academic teaching hospital affiliated with the Rappaport Faculty of Medicine of the Technion – Israel Institute of Technology, Israel's oldest university.

== Facilities ==
Rambam Hospital serves as a referral medical center and level I trauma center, employing a multidisciplinary approach to diagnosis and treatment. Some 80,000 people are hospitalized there every year, and another 600,000 are treated in its outpatient clinics and medical institutes. The Technion's medical school is located adjacent to the hospital. The medical center has 36 departments with 1000 beds, 45 medical units, 9 institutes, 6 laboratories and 30 administrative and maintenance departments. Comprehensive services for all of northern Israel include trauma treatment, oncology, and neurosurgery.

The Sammy Ofer Fortified Underground Emergency Hospital officially opened in its peacetime configuration in 2014, following a successful drill to test emergency preparedness. Work on this fortified emergency underground hospital began in 2010; it was designed to withstand conventional, chemical, and biological attacks. Planning for this project began in 2007. The project includes a three-floor parking lot that can be transformed within 72 hours into a 2,000-bed hospital. Made possible through a donation by the late Sammy Ofer, the hospital can generate its own power and store enough oxygen, drinking water and medical supplies for up to three days.

The Ruth Rappaport Children's Hospital has the largest pediatric emergency department in the north of Israel. This nine-story hospital, named for Ruth Rappaport, wife of banker and financier Bruce Rappaport, replaces the current Meyer Children's Hospital, providing additional pediatric facilities. In addition to new patient wards, there is a museum, classrooms and a movie theater.

The Joseph Fishman Oncology Center opened on June 20, 2016. The facility has nine floors and 10,000 square meters of space for providing a variety of cancer treatments for patients.

As an academic hospital, Rambam engages in teaching and research collaboration with the Technion's Rappaport Faculty of Medicine.

== History ==
A makeshift hospital was established by the British Government in 1918. This hospital moved to several locations in Haifa. The British Government Hospital of Haifa, future Rambam Hospital, was established as a permanent hospital in 1938 during the British Mandate. It was inaugurated by the High Commissioner of Palestine Sir Harold MacMichael as a 225-bed facility. The Bauhaus architect Erich Mendelsohn was commissioned to design the building on a half-moon shaped headland at the foot of Mount Carmel, northwest of Haifa Port. After the establishment of the State of Israel in 1948, the hospital was renamed Rambam in 1952, the acronym for Rabbi Mosheh Ben Maimon (Maimonides).

The new hospital had departments in internal medicine, surgery, obstetrics/gynecology, psychiatry, and clinics for venereal diseases and active tuberculosis. The December 23, 1938 edition of the Palestine Post wrote: "High Commissioner opens new government hospital in Haifa: Describes it as 'the finest medical institution in the Middle East.'" Its first director was John Herbert Thompson.

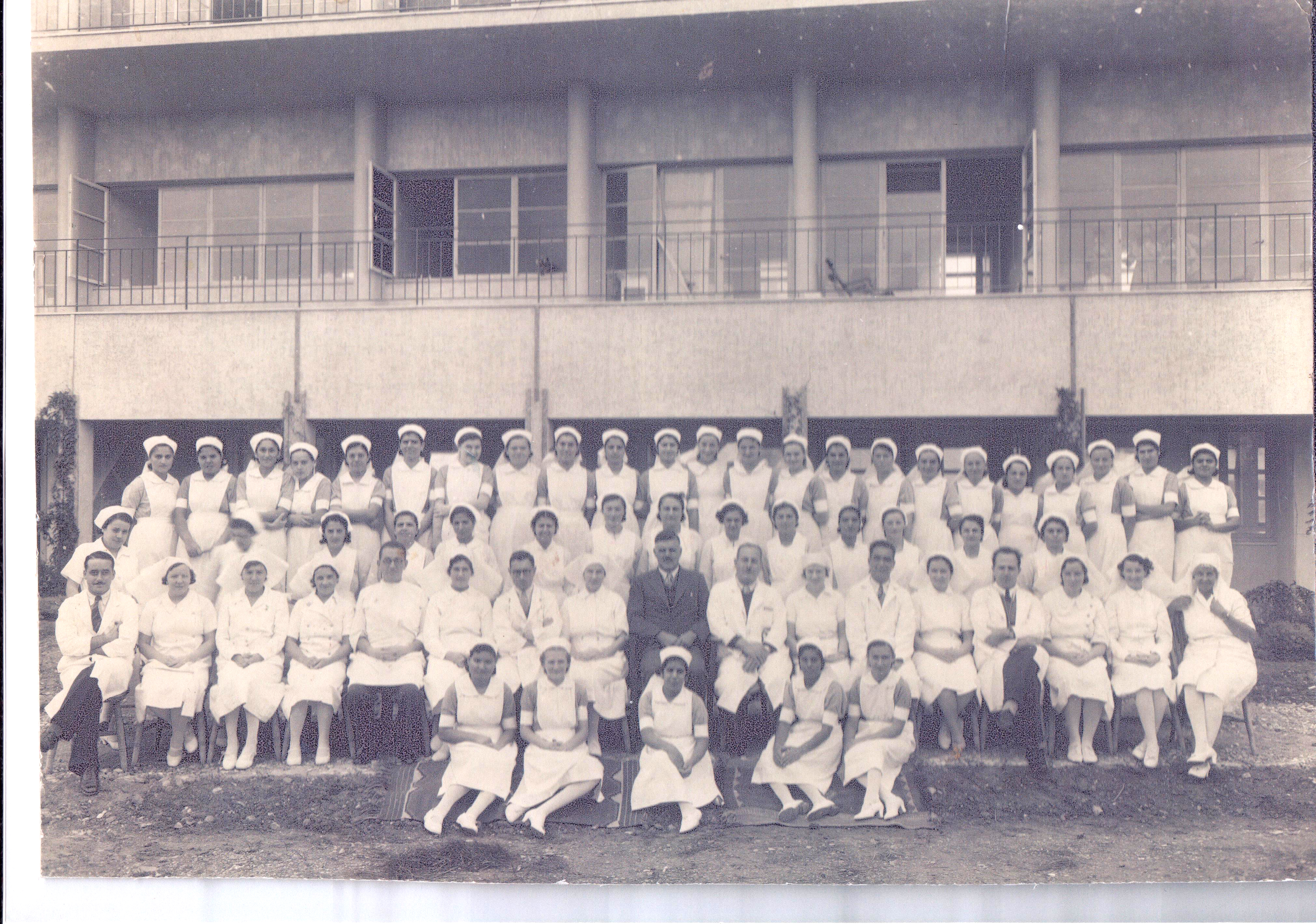
One of the first groups of graduates from the nursing school. Director of Palestine medical services, G. Heron, in dark suit.

In 1968, the Meyer Children's Hospital was established. It was the only children's hospital dedicated exclusively to pediatric medicine (children ages 0–16) in northern Israel, located on Rambam Health Care Campus. To accommodate the increasing number of pediatric patients, as of June 2014, the pediatric departments are now transferring to the new Ruth Rappaport Children's Hospital.

In 2012, the hospital banned the sale of tobacco products in shops, kiosks and vending machines on its campus.

In 2013, Rambam physicians performed the first ablation of the brain in a patient with essential tremor (ET) employing MRI-guided ultrasound instead of surgery.

In May, 2016, Rambam Health Care Campus was part of a group (IBM, Medtronic, Pitango, and Rambam) that won a grant from the Israeli government to open a digital medicine incubator. The new incubator, MindUp, is the first to be based in Haifa, and recently accepted its first start-up company.

Also in 2016, Rambam Health Care Campus became the first installation site in the world for a hybrid nuclear imaging scanner.

=== Directors ===
Following is a list of the directors for Rambam Health Care Campus:

- 1938–1948: John Herbert Thompson (as the Government Hospital under the British Mandate)
- 1948–1963: Rafael Gjebin
- 1963–1975: Moshe Lazar
- 1975–1979: Reuben Eldar
- 1979–1981: Leon Epstein (acting director)
- 1981–1986: Joseph Brandes
- 1987–2005: Moshe Revach
- 2006–2018: Rafael Beyar
- 2018–Present: Michael Halberthal

== Services ==
Leading departments at Rambam Health Care Campus include oncology and hemato-oncology, cardiac surgery, orthopedics, and neurosurgery. Rambam is the only provider of chemotherapy, radiotherapy, and brachiotherapy in Northern Israel. Other services unique to hospitals in Northern Israel include robotic surgery.

Rambam's Department of International Medicine was established in 1995. The large number of patients received from the former Soviet Union has led to the hospital providing a separate Russian-language website for this department. Rambam's medical tourism center is one of the largest in Israel.

Rambam Maimonides Medical Journal is an international quarterly publication coordinated by Rambam Health Care Campus.

== Ongoing development ==
Since 2007 Rambam Health Care Campus has been undergoing a major development effort in order to better meet the needs of the population it serves. This includes upgrading patient services, creation of new facilities, and construction of a fortified hospital for the safety of patients during times of extreme emergency. As of 2017, this project is still under way. Three buildings have been completed, with two remaining.

The Sammy Ofer Fortified Underground Emergency Hospital
Named for and primarily funded by the late Sammy Ofer, this 2,000-bed facility is the largest of its kind in the world. During peacetime it serves as a 1,500-vehicle underground parking lot. Within 72 hours it converts into a fully functioning hospital with fortification against conventional and non-conventional warfare. Following a logistics drill in March of 2014 this facility opened in its peacetime configuration.

The Ruth Rappaport Children's Hospital

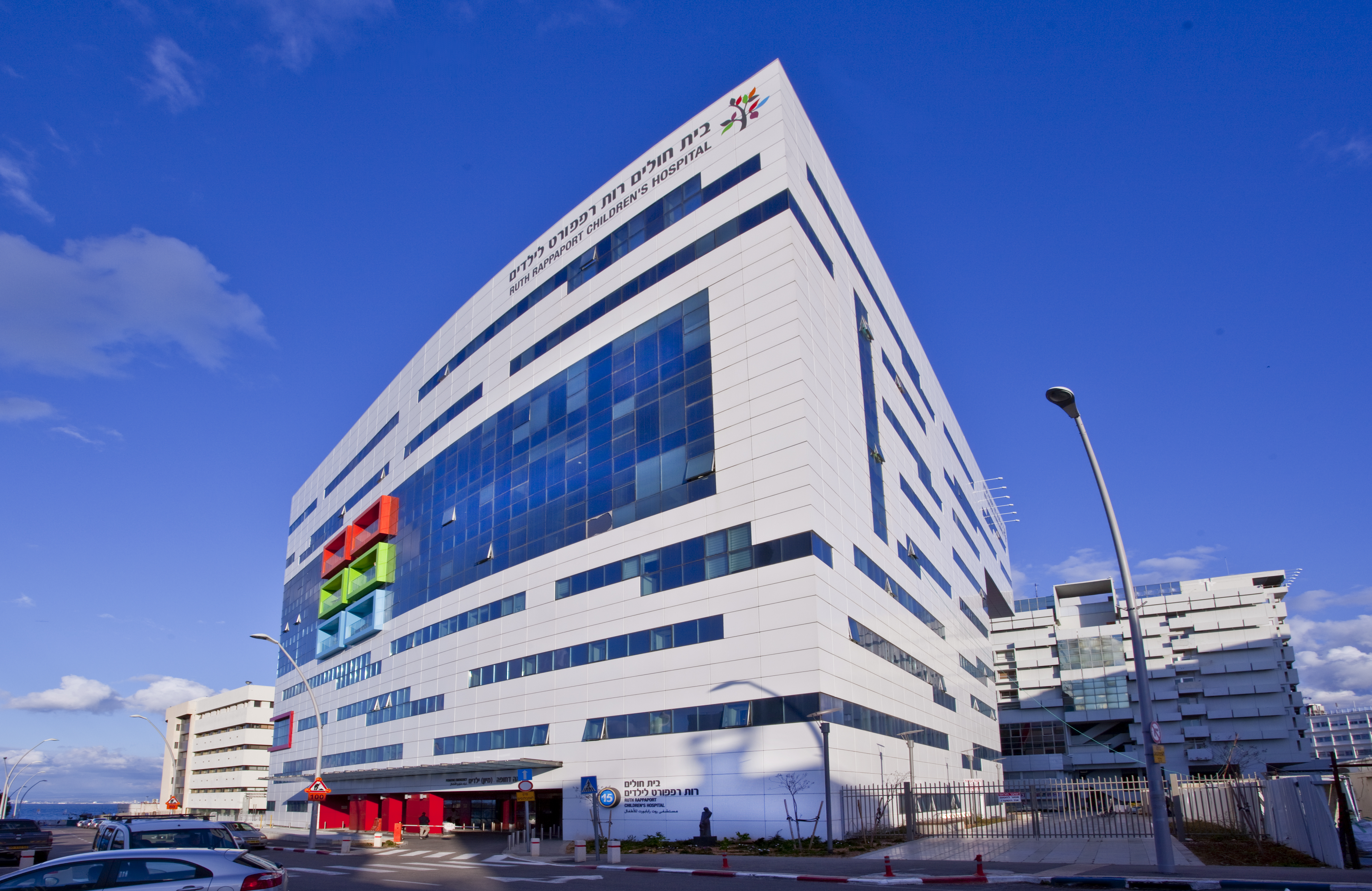
Exterior of the Ruth Rappaport Children's Hospital at Rambam Health Care Campus, showing entrance (bottom center) to Pediatric Emergency

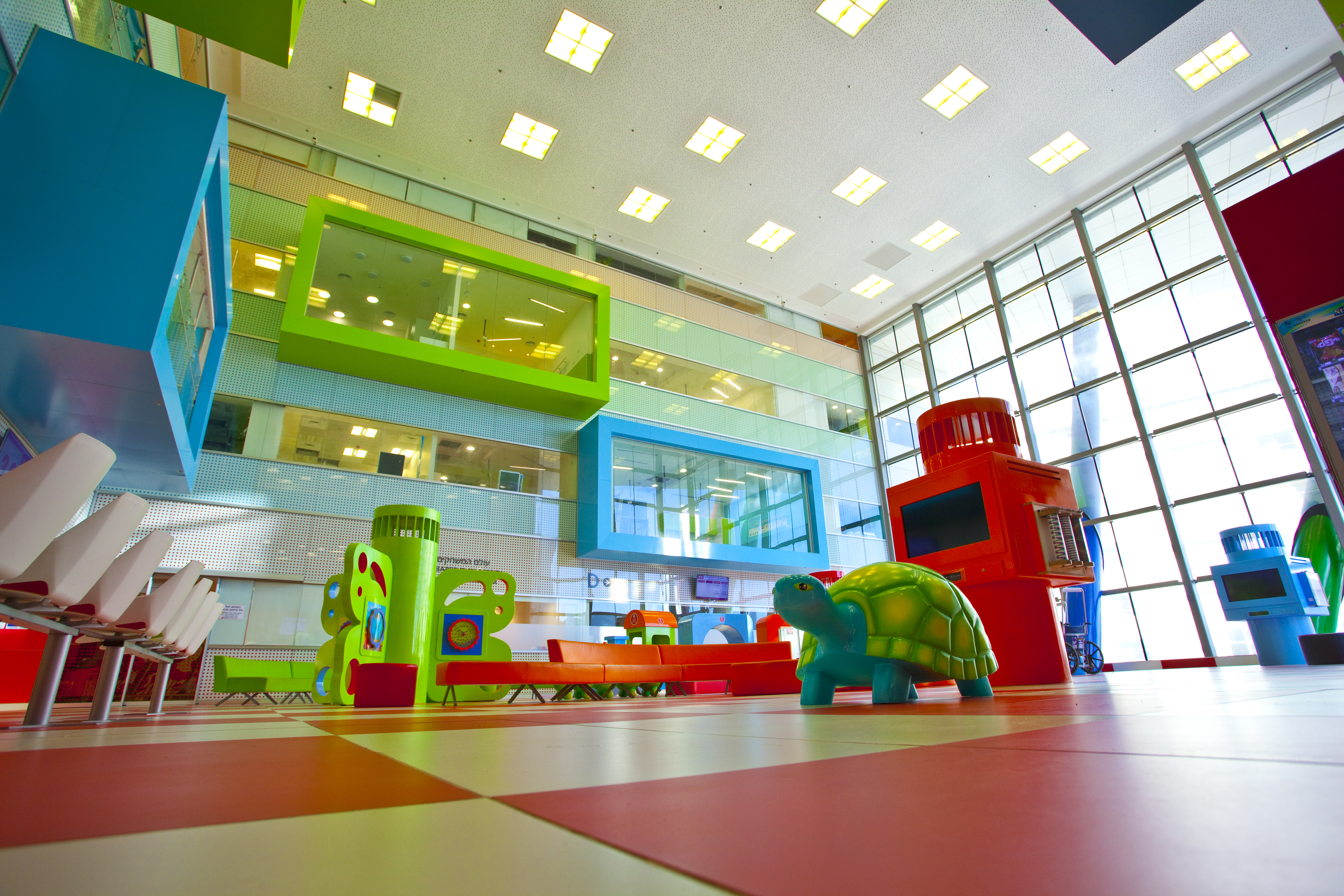
Interior play atrium, 5th floor of the Ruth Rappaport Children's Hospital at Rambam Health Care Campus

Named for and partially funded by Ruth Rappaport (wife of Bruce Rappaport), the new children's hospital officially opened in June of 2014. The new pediatric emergency department is the largest and most advanced in Israel.

Joseph Fishman Oncology Center

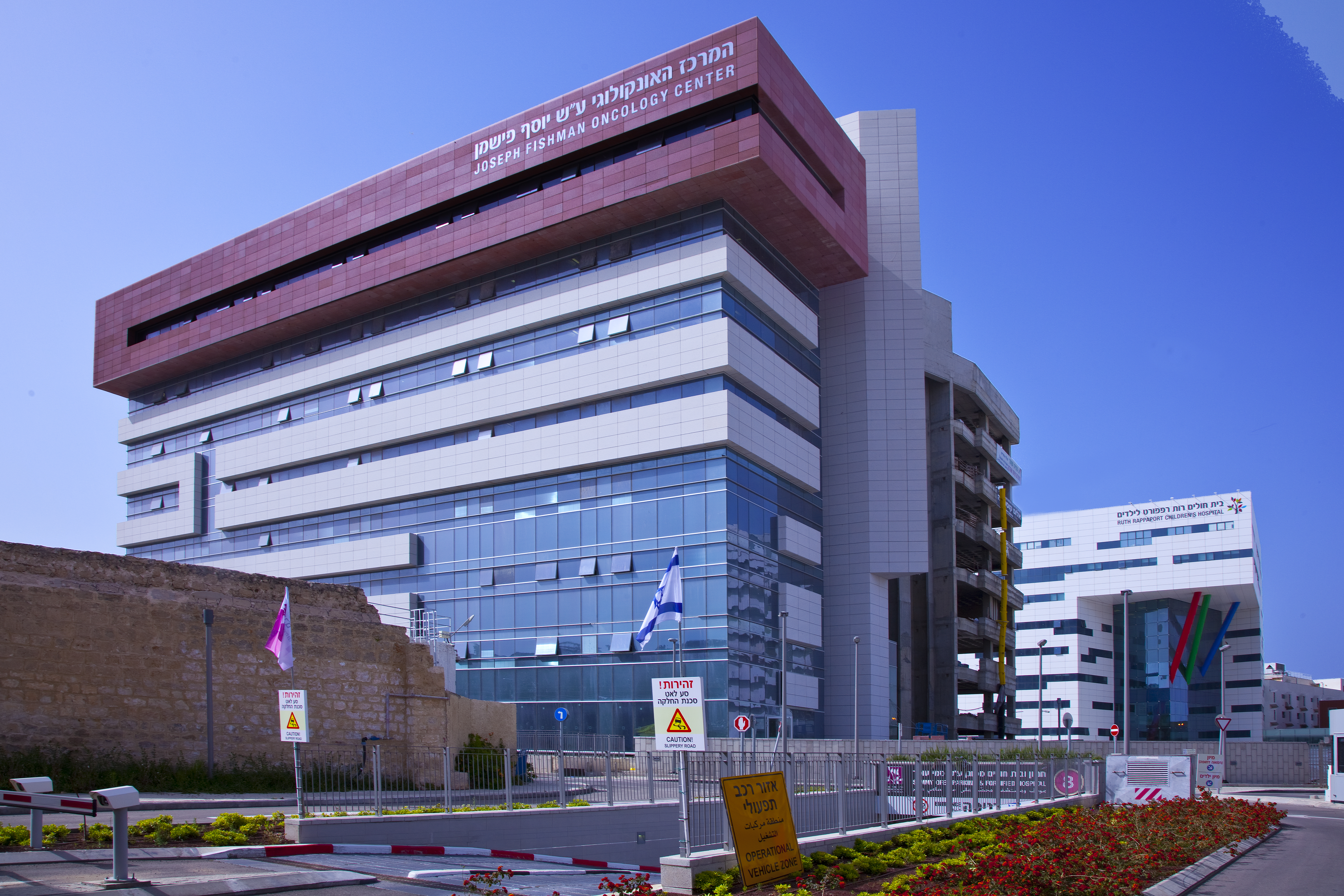
Joseph Fishman Oncology Center at Rambam Health Care Campus

Named for and partially funded by the late Joseph Fishman, this facility is providing upgraded services for cancer patients, including expanded alternative and complementary medicine for treating cancer and its side-effects.

Eyal Ofer Heart Hospital
This facility will offer an integrated model for cardiovascular care. It will also house research laboratories and offer cardiovascular risk-reduction programs. The groundbreaking ceremony was held on May 9, 2017.

Helmsley Health Discovery Tower
This 20-story facility will house clinical, educational, and research facilities of Rambam Health Care Campus, University of Haifa, and the Technion-Israel Institute of Technology. The grant from the Helmsley Charitable Trust to facilitate its construction is the Trust's largest donation in Israel to date.
