= Eucomed =

Eucomed was the organisation that represented the interests of the medical device industry in Europe. It represents directly and indirectly 4,500 designers, manufacturers and suppliers of medical technology used in the diagnosis, prevention, treatment and management of disease and disability. Eucomed represents a total of 11,000 legal entities in Europe. It is now part of MedTech Europe.

== Structure ==
Among its members, there are 24 national medical technology associations and 62 medical technology companies, comprising approximately 70% of the European market. Eucomed has over 65 expert groups. These groups deal with regulatory, economic, public affairs, international and legal affairs topics. Eucomed represents several sectors within medical technology such as ophthalmology, cardiovascular medicine, orthopaedics, advanced wound care and Community Care.

== Activities ==
Eucomed's main mission is to advocate for the medical device industry at the European level. It engages with policymakers with European institutions and EU member states, patient groups, and medical associations. It also represents the interests of the European medical device industry in relations with foreign markets. Eucomed regularly organises meetings and workshops for members and stakeholders. It is currently lobbying for the interests of the European medical device industry in the revision of the European medical device directive.

Eucomed conducts substantial research on the European medical device market. Along with the LSE and Bocconi University, Eucomed supports EHTI, an institute dedicated to that end.

== MedTech Europe ==
Eucomed is now part of MedTech Europe.

== MedTech Forum ==
The MedTech Europe alliance members organise the largest health and medical technology industry conference in Europe, the MedTech Forum. The conference is attended by policymakers, scientific communities, patient representatives, healthcare professionals, academics and representatives of the global medical technology industry.
