= The Ruth and Bruce Rappaport Faculty of Medicine =

Medical facility in Haifa

Coordinates: 32°50′3.2″N 34°59′1.5″E

Ruth and Bruce Rappaport Faculty of Medicine
- הפקולטה לרפואה ע ש רות וברוך רפפורט
- Established: 1969
- Dean: Professor Shimon Marom
- Location: Bat Galim, Haifa, Israel
- Website: http://md.technion.ac.il

The Ruth and Bruce Rappaport Faculty of Medicine is the medical school of Technion – Israel Institute of Technology. It is located in Bat Galim, Haifa, Israel.

The faculty was established in the late 1960s by a group of physicians who found the need for an academic school specialized in medical education and research.

The medical school merged with the Technion – Israel Institute of Technology in 1973.

== History ==
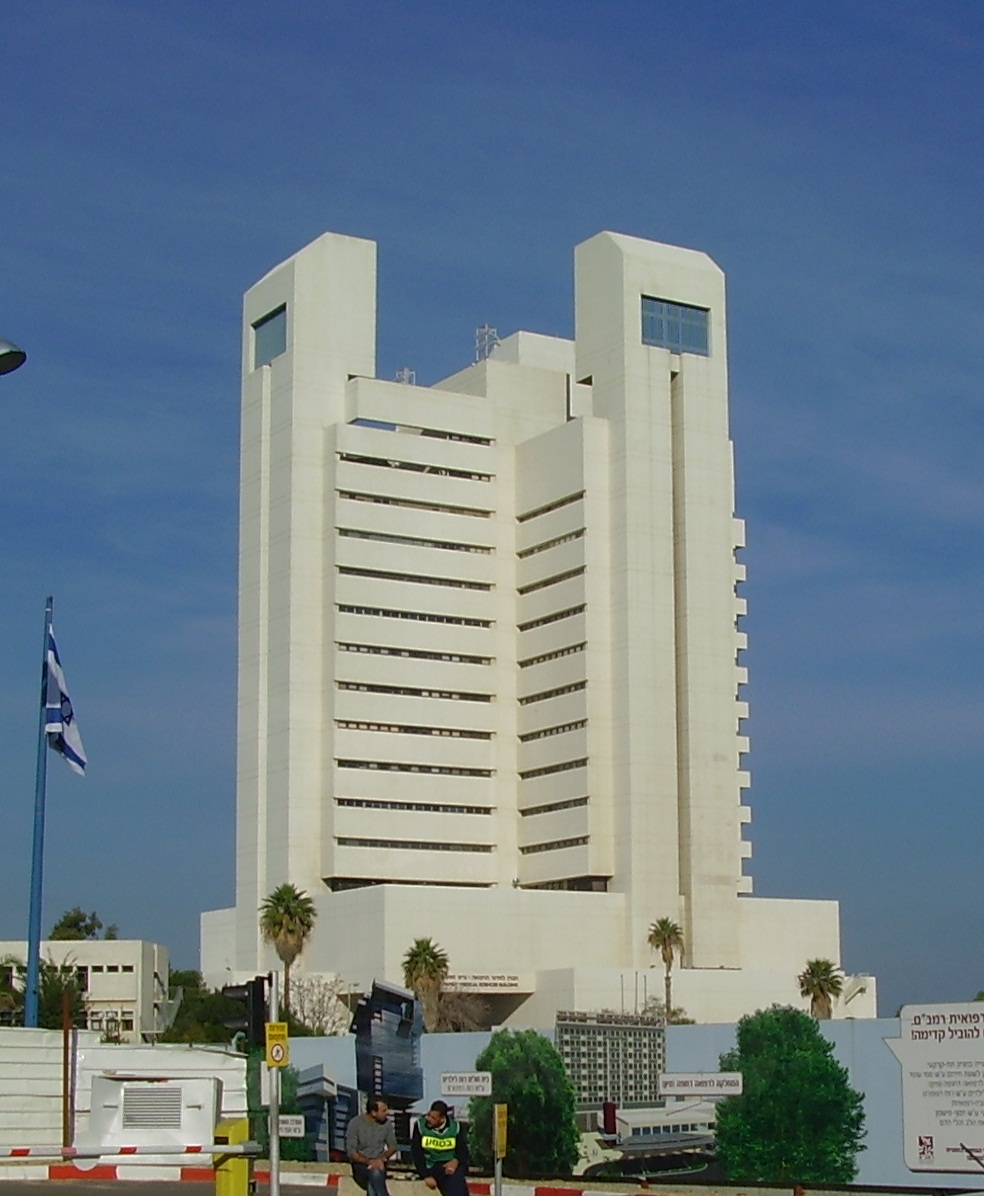
Medical sciences building of the Rappaport Faculty of Medicine in the center of Haifa

In the late 1960s a need for a medical school and research center in Northern Israel was increasing. The medical school was established in 1969 to fill in the need. On January 3, 1971, the Technion Senate approved the merger of the Medical School with the Technion. On October 1, 1973, the school became a full faculty of the school. The academic backing and funding of the Technion progressed the expansive of the school into a full 6-year medical school.

== Notable achievements ==
The faculty is the home of two Nobel Laureates: Prof. Avram Hershko and Prof. Aaron Ciechanover.

== See also ==
- Technion – Israel Institute of Technology
