= Bat Galim cable car =

System in Haifa, Israel

Coordinates: 32.8314°N 34.9703°E

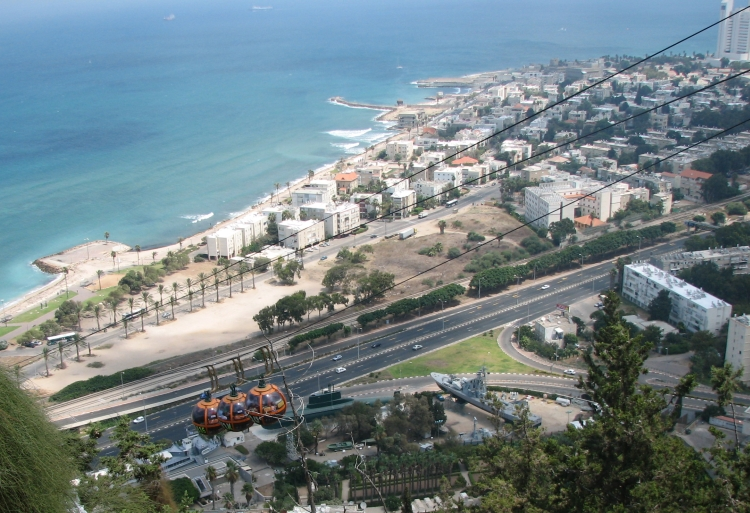
Cable cars running between Bat Galim and Mount Carmel

The Bat Galim cable car (Hebrew: רַכֶּבֶל חֵיפָה; rakevel Ḥēyfā) is tourist cable car running up and down the mountain from the top of the Carmel, across from the Stella Maris Carmelite Monastery, to Bat Galim, with views of Haifa Bay and its surroundings. The cable car began operating in 1986. The route is 355 meters long.

It is one of two cable car systems in Haifa, Israel, the other one being the Rakavlit – a public-transportation aerial tramway in the southeastern part of the city, which ascends from the Haifa Bay public transit hub to the hilly areas housing the University of Haifa and the Technion.

== See also ==
- Carmelit
- Egged
- Metronit
- Transportation in Israel
