= Gwinnett College =

For-profit college in Georgia

Coordinates: 33.90126°N 84.12205°W

Gwinnett College is a for-profit college with its main campus in Lilburn, Georgia.

== History ==
Gwinnett College was founded in Lilburn, Georgia in July 1976, by its past president Ruby B. Jackson, as an answer to the tremendous growth being experienced in the North Atlanta, Georgia area and by Gwinnett County in particular.

== Academics ==
The school offers associate degrees and certificates.

== Accreditation ==
Gwinnett College is accredited by the Accrediting Council for Independent Colleges and Schools, and is approved by the US Department of Education. Gwinnett College is also authorized to operate by the Georgia Nonpublic Postsecondary Education Commission.

== Sandy Springs campus ==
Formerly known as the Rising Spirit Institute of Natural Health, Gwinnett College - Sandy Springs (GCSS) is located in Sandy Springs, Georgia, a suburb of the Atlanta, Georgia metropolitan area. It offers diplomas and certificates in massage therapy, medical assisting and medical office administration.

As of January 2013, enrollment at GCSS is 126, with tuition listed at $11,995 per year.

=== History ===
Gwinnett College – Sandy Springs was founded as the New Life Institute in 1994 by Bruce and Marti Costello, and later renamed to the Rising Spirit Institute in 2000. It was founded as a school for massage therapy, with the specialty program being Neuromuscular Therapy. It was acquired by Gwinnett College in 2006. In October 2008, the name was changed to Gwinnett College – Sandy Springs, and two new programs of Medical Assisting and Medical Office Administration were added.

=== Accreditation ===
GCSS is accredited by the Accrediting Commission of Career Schools and Colleges, and is approved by the US Department of Education. GCSS is also approved to operate by the Georgia Nonpublic Postsecondary Education Commission.
