= MedTech Europe =

MedTech Europe is the European trade association representing the medical technology industries, from diagnosis to cure. It represents Diagnostics and Medical Devices manufacturers operating in Europe. It is born as an alliance of two European medical technology associations, EDMA and Eucomed, representing the European IVD and medical device industries, respectively. It was established with the aim to represent the common policy goals of both organisations more effectively, promoting the interests of its members and of the medical technology industry in general. There are more than 33,000 medical technology companies in Europe. The highest number of them are based in Germany, followed by Italy, the UK, France and Switzerland.

== Structure ==
After four years of collaboration, on 30 November 2016, EDMA and Eucomed voted to dissolve their respective European associations. MedTech Europe then became a single entity, representing the European medical technology sector, from diagnosis to cure.

== Activities ==
MedTech Europe generally focuses on five policy areas of common interest to its forming associations. The areas are the environment, health care associated infections (HCAI), industry data, health technology assessment (HTA), and its internal five-year-industry strategy aiming to “increase value-based innovations” that allow "healthcare systems to become more sustainable". It is currently lobbying for the interests of the European medical device and in-vitro diagnostics industry in the revision of the European medical device and in-vitro diagnostics directives.

== MedTech Forum ==
The MedTech Europe alliance members organise the largest health and medical technology industry conference in Europe, the MedTech Forum. The conference is attended by policymakers, scientific communities, patient representatives, healthcare professionals, academics and representatives of the global medical technology industry.
