= Denmark–Israel relations =

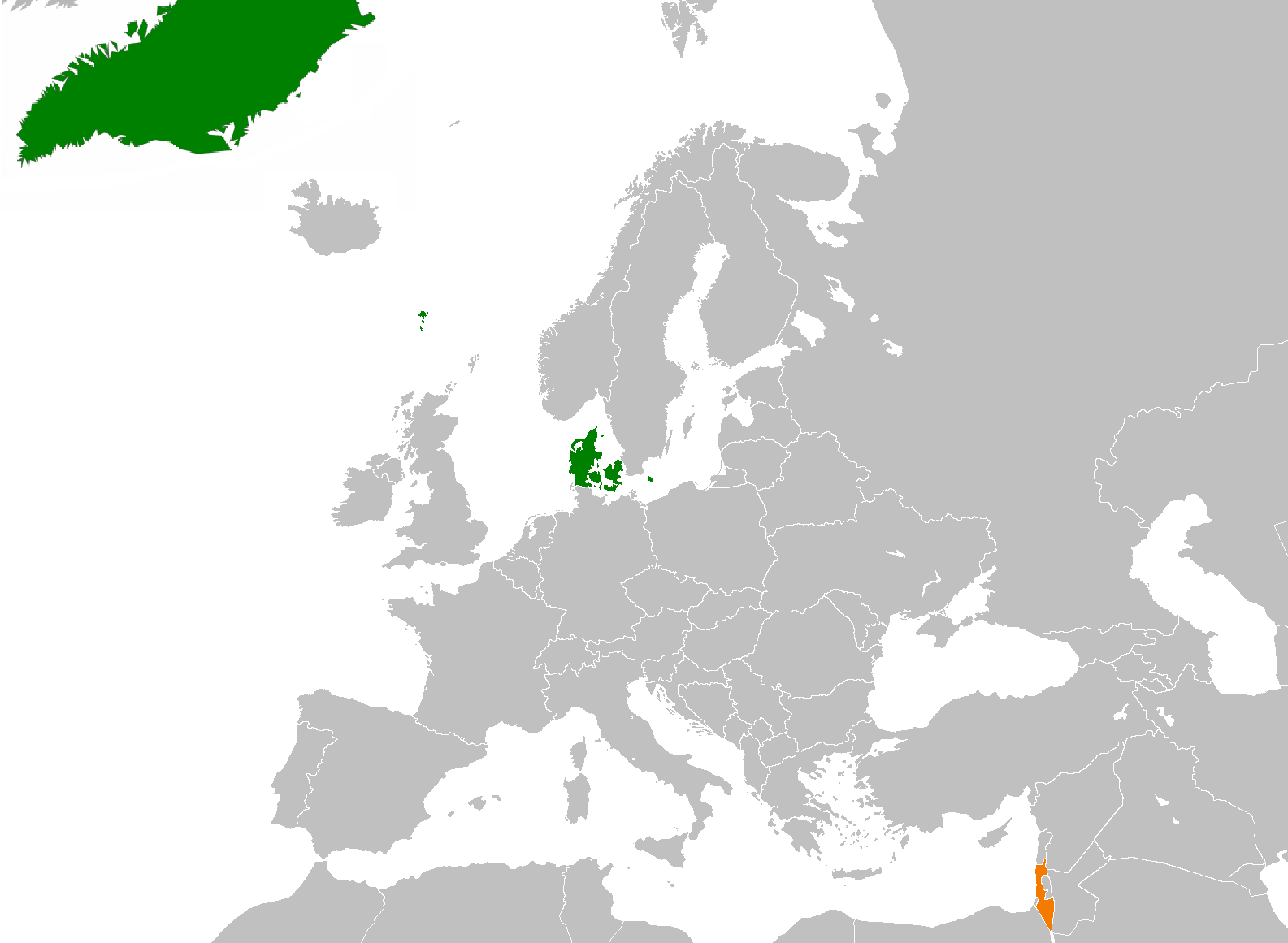
- Denmark: Israel

Denmark–Israel relations refers to the bilateral relationship between Denmark and Israel.

== History ==
=== Pre-Israel ===
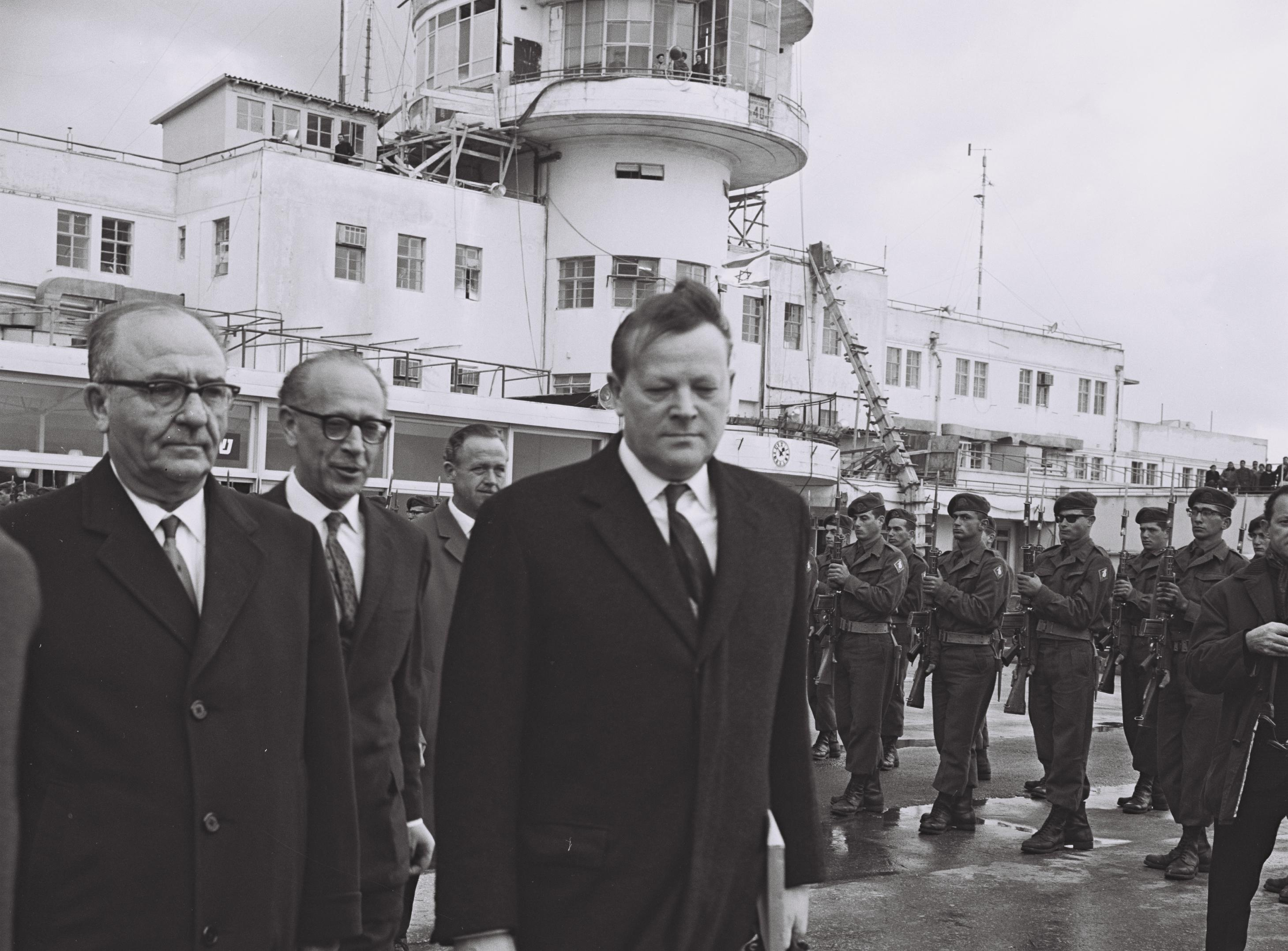
Jens Otto Krag & Levi Eshkol

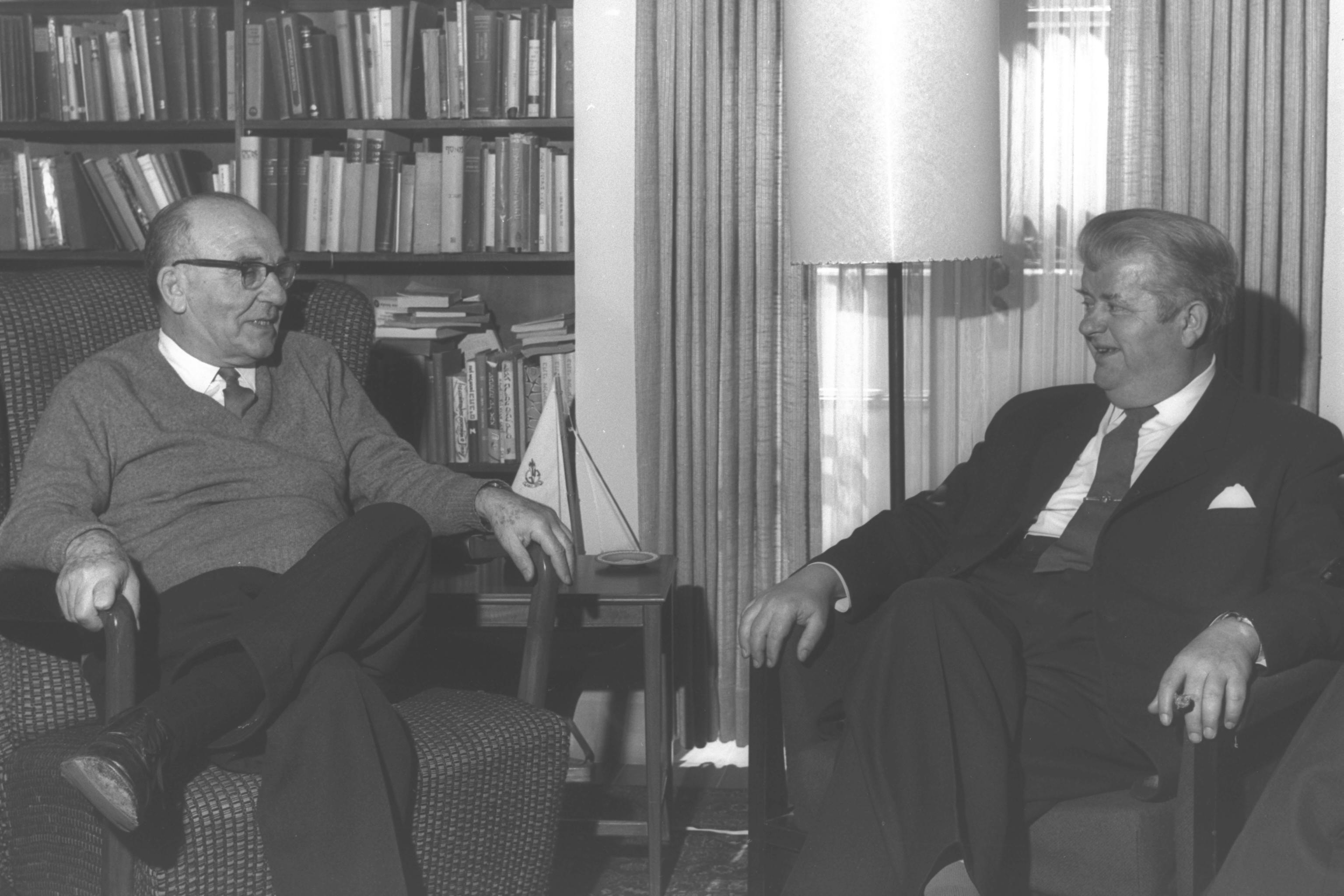
Per Hækkerup & Levi Eshkol

During World War I, in 1918, the World Zionist Organization set up a central office in Copenhagen in order to present the claims of the Zionist Jews at the Paris peace conference.

From 9 April 1940, to August 1943, the Danish Jewish community was safe from persecution. The Danish underground smuggled 7,000 Jews to Sweden. For this, Israel granted the Righteous Among Nations honorific to the Danish resistance movement. Every 5 years, the rescue operation is commemorated and celebrated in both countries. In addition, in Jerusalem (1962) and Haifa (2013), there are special sculpture monuments dedicated to the rescue of Danish Jews, set in plazas bearing the name "Denya (Denmark) Square". In Jerusalem, there is a school named in Denmark's honor. King Christian X hospital in Eitanim is named after Denmark's king during World War II. In Copenhagen, the main monument the Stone at Israels Plads (1968). The Ryvangen Memorial Park in Hellerup (1950) has references to Danish underground members who risked their lives to rescue Jews. Two memorial monuments more exist next to the wharves from where the Jews were sent to Sweden in Gilleleje and Køge.

=== Formation of Israel ===
Denmark voted for the partition of Palestine in 1947 and supports Israel in the United Nations. Denmark has an embassy in Israel, and Israel has had an embassy in Copenhagen since 1949. Denmark recognized and established diplomatic relations with Israel on 2 February 1949.

During the first decades of the existence of the State of Israel, many Danes admired the young country, striving to flourish amid hostile neighbors, basing itself on socialist values. Thousands of Danes came to volunteer starting the 1960s in Israeli kibbuzim. It is estimated that over 2,000 Danes came to volunteer in Israel, and that 20 out of 179 parliament members in 2010 were actual kibbutz volunteers in their past.

== Contemporary developments ==
In 2003, On the 60th anniversary of the end of World War II, the former prime minister, Anders Fogh Rasmussen, told a crowd of people that the actions of Nazi collaborators are a stain on Denmark's otherwise good reputation. Because of the rescue of all Danish Jews during World War II, the Yad Vashem declared the collective Danish resistance as Righteous Among the Nations. In May 2005, Denmark apologized for sending Jews to Nazi concentration camps.

During the 2014 Israel–Gaza conflict, there were protests in Copenhagen, Aarhus and Odense. In Copenhagen, the police estimated between 500 and 600 people demonstrated in front of the Israeli Embassy in Copenhagen. 400 people protested in Aarhus, and 500 in Odense.

In October 2024, two Swedish citizens carried out a grenade attack near the Israeli embassy in Copenhagen that caused property damage but no injuries. In February 2026, a Danish court convicted both men of terrorism and attempted murder for the attack; the younger defendant, then 18, was sentenced to 12 years in prison and the older, then 21, to 14 years, with prosecutors stating that the explosives were intended to “seriously frighten the Israeli and Danish populations.” One of the men also faced charges in Sweden for a separate attack on the Israeli embassy in Stockholm the previous day.

The political lives of the two states have been somewhat intertwined: The former Israeli minister of social and diaspora affairs Michael Melchior was born in Denmark and is the son of former chief rabbi in Copenhagen, Bent Melchior, the nephew of former Danish minister of traffic and minister of tourism and communication Arne Melchior, and the grandson of the acting rabbi for the Jewish refugees from Denmark in Sweden 1943–45, Marcus Melchior; the executive director of the Peres Center for Peace 2001–2011, Ron Pundak, who played an important role in starting the Oslo peace process and was part of the core group behind the Geneva Initiative, is the son of the influential Danish journalist Herbert Pundik; and prominent Israeli politician Yohanan Plesner, former chairman of the Plesner Committee, is the son of Danish architect Ulrik Plesner.

== Historical visits ==
In January 1962, Viggo Kampmann, Danish Prime minister, was the first senior figure from Denmark to ever visit Israel. He inaugurated, during his visit, the "Denya Square" in Jerusalem in a ceremony attended also by the former prime minister of Israel, David Ben-Gurion and Jerusalem's mayor, Mordechai Ish-Shalom. In 1965, prime minister Jens Otto Krag, visited Israel, and in 1972, foreign affair minister, Knud Børge Andersen paid his visit. In 1983, Danish Prime minister, Poul Schlüter, visited Israel, being the first figure to visit Israel, pertaining to the Conservative People's Party, while all previous belonged to the Social democrats Party.

In 2002 Israel's foreign affair minister, Shimon Peres, visited Denmark to meet with his counterpart and the prime minister, in honor of Denmark's presidency of the European Union for that year. During the visit, a beer glass was thrown at him as he was walking through the Tivoli Gardens.

In 2013, Frederik, Crown Prince of Denmark visited Israel, being the first Danish, and Scandinavian, royal to ever visit Israel. He met with President Peres, who expressed the gratitude of Israel to the Danish people for their actions to rescue Jews during the Holocaust.

In 2016, Lars Løkke Rasmussen paid a private tour to Israel, where he met Israeli Prime minister, Benjamin Netanyahu

In 2018, the Israeli president, Reuven Rivlin, visited Denmark to mark the 75th anniversary of the rescue of the Danish Jews. During the most covered visit, he spoke at the Gilleleje church and at the Jewish synagogue of Copenhagen.

== Israeli ambassadors to Denmark ==
- Esther Herlitz (1966–1971)- the first Israeli female ambassador in history
- Carmi Gillon (2001–2003)
- Barukh Binah (2013–2017)
- Benny Dagan (2017–present)

== Resident diplomatic missions ==
- Denmark has an embassy in Tel Aviv.
- Israel has an embassy in Copenhagen.

== See also ==
- Foreign relations of Denmark
- Foreign relations of Israel
- Denmark-Palestine relations
- History of the Jews in Denmark
- Danish resistance movement
