= Vishnevo =

Vishnevo may refer to:

- Vishnevo, Bulgaria, a village in Banite Municipality of Smolyan Province, Bulgaria
- Vishnevo, Russia, a rural locality (a selo) in Belovsky District of Kursk Oblast, Russia
- Vishnyeva (Vishnevo), a village in Minsk Oblast, Belarus

== See also ==
- Vyshneve, a town in Kyiv Oblast, Ukraine
