= Shoshana Gershonowitz =

Israel Defense Forces officer

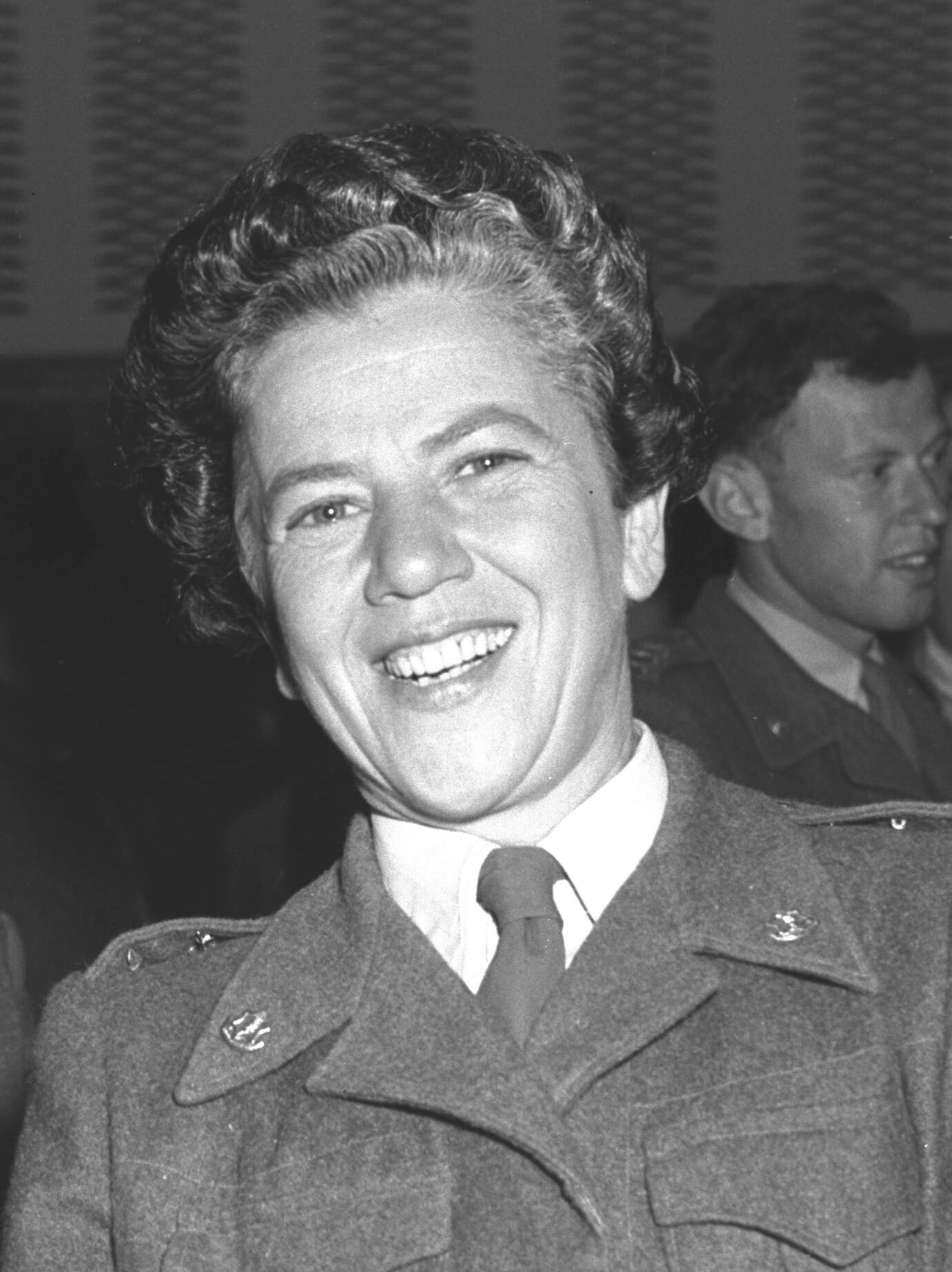
Shoshana Gershonowitz

Shoshana Gershonowitz (Hebrew: שושנה גרשונוביץ; 1906–1986) was an Israel Defense Forces officer who served as commander of the Women's Corps from 1952 to 1959.

== Early life and career ==
Shoshana Gershonowitz was born in Russia. She emigrated to Palestine in 1925 and settled in Jerusalem. She was active at the Haganah. During World War II she was among the first 66 women to join the Auxiliary Territorial Service, and one of four to become an officer and retired as a captain.

In 1947 she established the women's unit of the Haganah in Jerusalem. She served as deputy to Mina Ben-Zvi, IDF Women's Corps first commander. In 1952 she served as the Nahal's women commander. Between 1952 and 1959, she was promoted to colonel and served as Women's Corps commander-in-chief, under the direct command of IDF head of manpower, in charge of all IDF women. Upon leaving the army, she served as attaché for liaison with women's organizations in Washington, D.C.

She appeared on the May 18, 1958, episode of the quiz show What's My Line? under the name Shoshana Gershom and succeeded in stumping the panel, which was unable to guess her occupation.
