= List of ambassadors of Israel to Denmark =

Israel's diplomatic representatives to Denmark have included ministers and ambassadors. This list begins in 1950 with non-resident minister Avraham Nissan, who was based in Stockholm.

== List ==
- Minister Avraham Nissan (Non-Resident, Stockholm) 1950–1956
- Minister Yehuda Gaulan 1954–1954
- Minister Harry Beilin 1954–1957
- Zvi Avnon 1958–1961 (Minister 1957–1958)
- Esther Herlits 1966–1971
- Itzhak Ben-Ari 1975–1978
- Raanan Sivan 1978–1981
- Yosef Hadass 1981–1983
- Shamay Cahana 1983–1987
- Nathan Meron 1991–1995
- Avraham Setton 1995–1999
- Yitzhak Eldan 1999–2001
- Carmi Gillon 2001–2003
- David Walzer 2004–2008
- Arthur Avnon 2008–2013
- Barukh Binah 2013–2017
- Benny Dagan 2017–2021
- David Akov since 2021
