= Esther Herlitz =

Israeli diplomat and politician

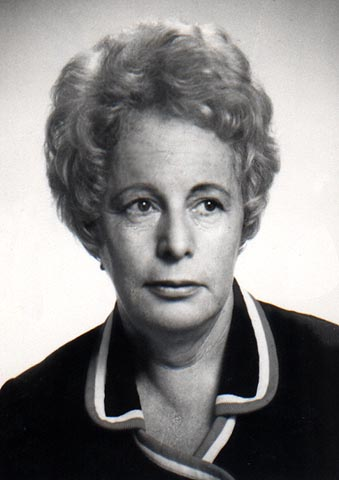
- Herlitz during her time in the Knesset

Faction represented in the Knesset
- 1974–1977: Alignment
- 1979–1981: Alignment

Personal details
- Born: 9 October 1921 Berlin, Germany
- Died: 24 March 2016 (aged 94)

Esther Herlitz (Hebrew: אסתר הרליץ; 9 October 1921 – 24 March 2016) was an Israeli diplomat and politician who served as a member of the Knesset for the Alignment between 1973 and 1977 and again from 1979 until 1981. She was also Israel's first female ambassador, having been appointed as the country's ambassador to Denmark in 1966.

== Early life and education ==
Born in Berlin, Germany in 1921, Herlitz emigrated with her family to Mandatory Palestine in 1933. Her father, historian George Herlitz, founded the Central Zionist Archives in Jerusalem. She attended high school in Jerusalem, first at the Gymnasia Rehavia, and later at the Hebrew University Secondary School. She also studied at a teachers seminary and the Foreign Service school.

== Military career ==
Herlitz joined the Haganah as a recruiter at the Sarafand Training Camp. She then was promoted to a rank of an officer in the British Army, and later served in the Israel Defense Forces.

In 1947, Herlitz became one of the 25 candidates who got accepted into the new school for diplomats established by the Jewish Agency. However, she postponed those studies due to the 1947–1949 Palestine war. During the conflict, she served with the Etzioni Jerusalem brigade, defending the capital from Egyptian attack. When the war came to an end in summer of 1948, Herlitz's mentor, Moshe Sharett, ordered her release so that she can work for him as Minister for Foreign Affairs. Despite negotiations, between Sharett, David Shaltiel and Mina Ben-Zvi, Herlitz was not officially discharged from the Israeli Defense Forces, but was allowed to serve as a minister regardless. During her time as a minister, she was involved in negotiating the Reparations Agreement between Israel and West Germany for which deed she was appointed head of the American desk, a country which she visited only in September 1949 as a United Nations delegate. During her time as a delegate, she officially met Eleanor Roosevelt, the First Lady of the President of the United States and formed a bond with her.

== Political career ==
Herlitz became First Secretary at the Israeli embassy in Washington, D.C. in 1950, serving as such under Abba Eban, Teddy Kollek and Chaim Herzog. Following a move to New York in 1954, she served at State's council between 1955 and 1958 and during those years was a visiting consul to Boston. From 1958 to 1962, Herlitz, with Sharett's approval, established and then headed the International Department of Mapai at the same time serving as director of public relations for the Ministry of Foreign Affairs.

Herlitz was also a member of Tel Aviv City Council, and chaired its culture committee between 1960 and 1964. During her time as chairwoman, Herlitz helped establish Beit Ariela as well as development of literacy classes for immigrant and lower-income women. She returned to a position of a Foreign Minister in 1962, and after serving under Golda Meir, was appointed head of the Guest Department, responsibility of which include caring for visitors from abroad. Two years later, Herlitz became head of the Information Department working to establish positive image of Israel. She was the first woman to be elected as head of the ministry's staff committee, but resigned a year later to pursue political future by joining Mapai party to run for Knesset in 1965. However, her party suffered defeat during the 1965 Israeli legislative elections, and she returned to her ministry duties becoming the first woman after Golda Meir to be appointed as ambassador to Denmark at which post she served until 1971.

In 1972 she founded the Centre for Volunteer Services, and the following year was elected to the Knesset on the Alignment list. Following Yom Kippur War, Herlitz became the first woman to serve on the male-dominated Committee for Foreign Affairs and Defense. While serving on the committee, she discussed such issues as Agranat Commission, and Operation Entebbe, which was launched to rescue 248 Israeli hostages which were held at Entebbe International Airport in Uganda. In 1974, as a member of the Israeli Labor Party, Herlitz was elected to Eighth Knesset and three years later was elected to the Ninth. She also served on Internal Affairs Committee and on the Constitution, Law and Justice Committee, prior to losing her seat in the 1977 elections. She returned to the Knesset on 14 August 1979 as a replacement for the deceased Yehoshua Rabinovitz but then lost her seat again in the 1981 elections.

Between 1977 and 1981 Herlitz served as secretary of the Tel Aviv branch of Na'amat, and was also on the organisation's central committee.

== Awards ==
Throughout her career, Herlitz was awarded numerous awards and honorary degrees including, Shield for Voluntarism (1996), an honorary D.H.L. degree from Hebrew Union College (1999), and the Woman of Distinction Award of Hadassah (2003). In 1996 she also became the Distinguished Citizen of Tel Aviv. In 2015 she was awarded the Israel Prize for her "unique contribution to society and the state".

== See also ==
- Denmark–Israel relations
