= Yehoshua Rabinovitz =

Israeli politician (1911–1979)

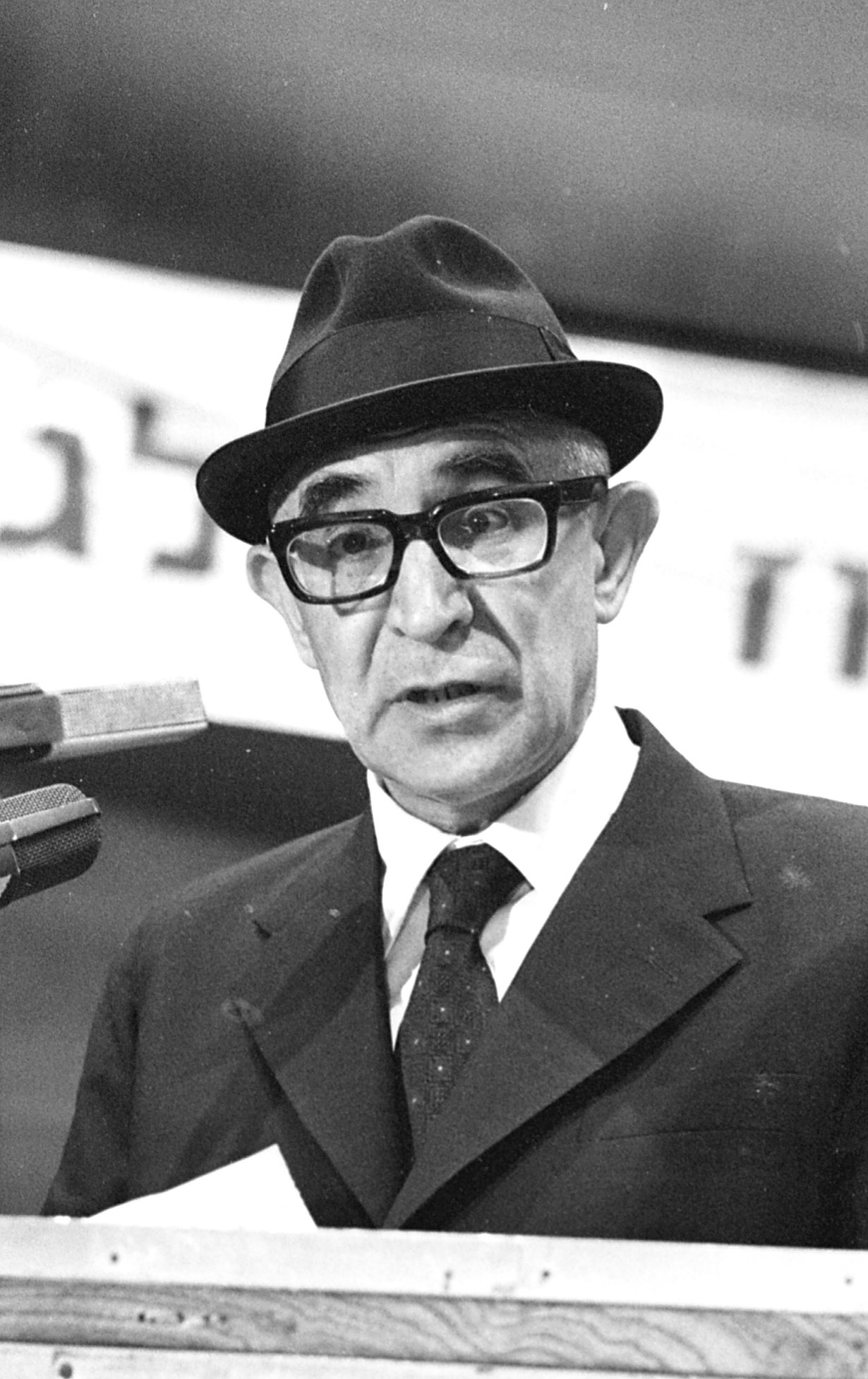
- Rabinovitz in 1973

Ministerial roles
- 1974: Minister of Housing
- 1974–1977: Minister of Finance

Faction represented in the Knesset
- 1977–1979: Alignment

Other roles
- 1969–1974: Mayor of Tel Aviv

Personal details
- Born: 12 November 1911 Vishneva, Russian Empire
- Died: 14 August 1979 (aged 67)

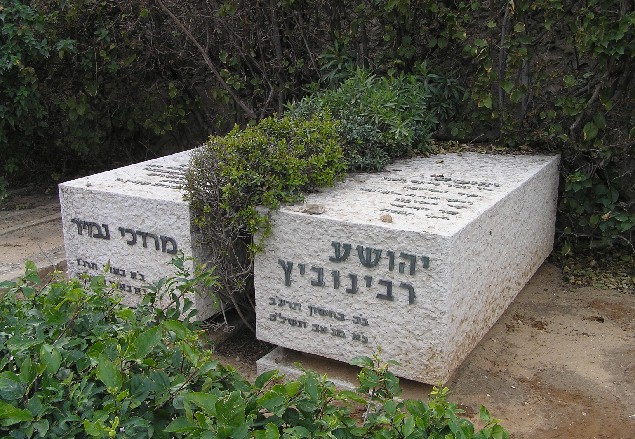
Tomb of Rabinovitz and fellow mayor of Tel Aviv Mordechai Namir in Trumpeldor cemetery

Yehoshua Rabinovitz (Hebrew: יהושע רבינוביץ; 12 November 1911 – 14 August 1979) was an Israeli politician who served as a government minister and mayor of Tel Aviv.

== Biography ==
Born in Vishneva in the Russian Empire (today in Belarus), Rabinovitz attended high school in Vilnius, and went on to train as a teacher in the same city. He worked as a teacher and headmaster, and was a member of the HeHalutz movement. He emigrated to Mandatory Palestine in 1934 and studied in the economics and law school of Tel Aviv University. Prior to independence he worked for Hamashbir Lazarchan, and was involved in the Haganah.

In 1955 he was elected onto Tel Aviv city council, serving until 1959. That year he became Deputy Mayor in charge of Finances, a position he held until becoming mayor in 1969. He served as mayor until 1974. Rabinovitz was succeeded as mayor by Shlomo Lahat.

Although not a member of the Knesset, he was appointed Minister of Housing in March 1974 by Golda Meir. After Meir resigned, he became Minister of Finance in Yitzhak Rabin's government, serving until 1977. In the 1977 elections he was elected to the Knesset on the Alignment list, but lost his cabinet post as Likud formed a right-wing government.

While attending the funeral of David Horowitz in August 1979, Rabinovitz suffered a heart attack and died from it soon after. His seat was taken by Esther Herlitz.

== Commemoration ==
Yarkon Park in Tel Aviv, officially named "Ganei Yehoshua," is named for him.
