= Denmark–Palestine relations =

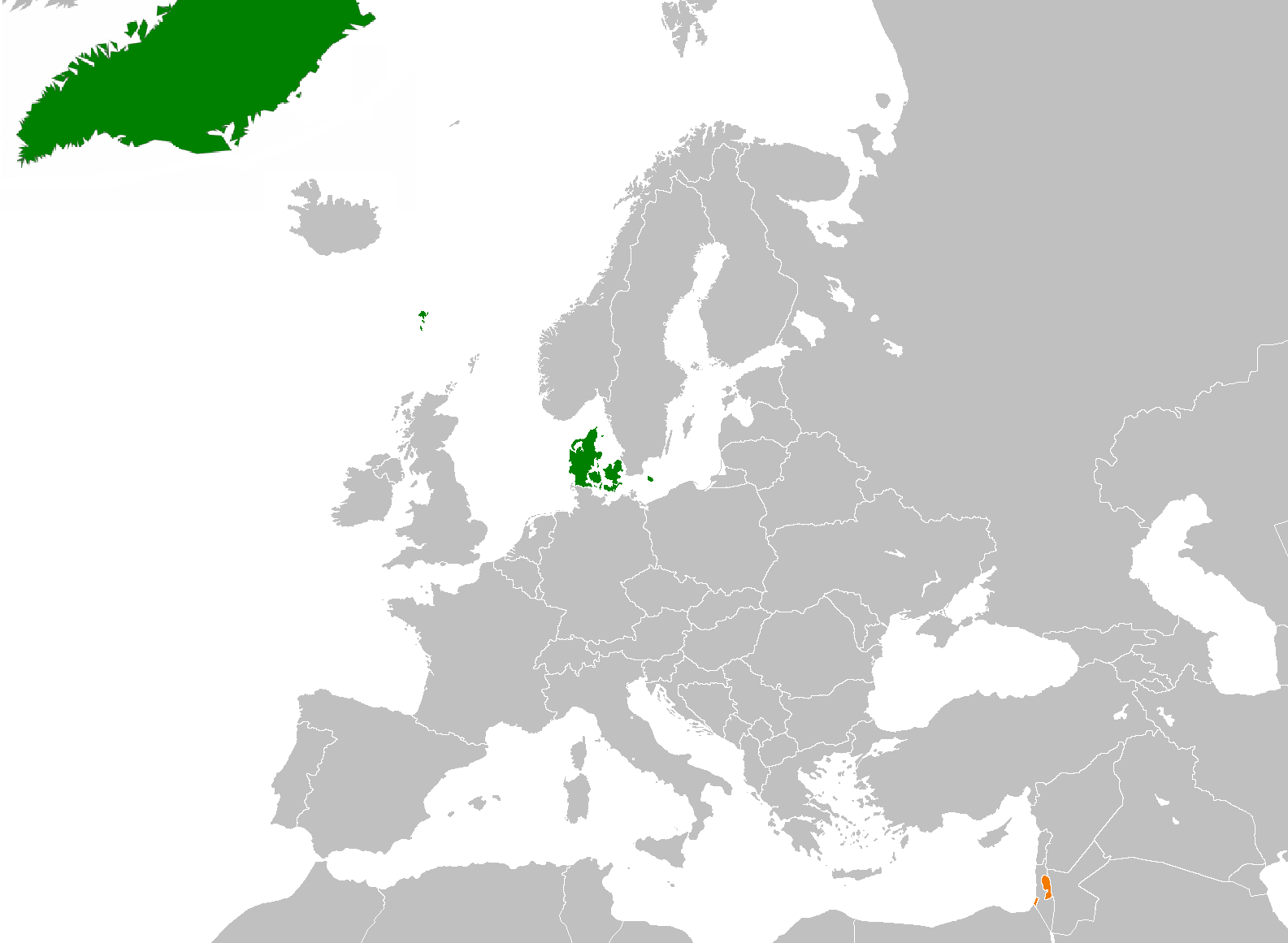

- Denmark: Palestine

Diplomatic mission
- Danish Representation in Ramallah: Mission of the State of Palestine in Denmark

Denmark–Palestine relations refers to the contacts between Denmark and the Palestinian Authority. Denmark has a representative office in Ramallah, and the State of Palestine has a diplomatic mission with the rank of ambassador in Copenhagen. Denmark remains the only country in Scandinavia that has not recognized the existence and sovereignty of the State of Palestine.

== Recognition of the State of Palestine ==
On 29 November 1947, Denmark voted in favour for the United Nations Partition Plan for Palestine, supporting the division of Palestine into two states. In December 2010, the Palestinian National Authority asked Denmark to recognize the state with its 1967 borders. In January 2011, Denmark with Norway said that they would soon recognize the State of Palestine, and on 9 March, Mahmoud Abbas visited Denmark for the first time, to discuss bilateral relations between Denmark and Palestine. During the visit, Danish Foreign Minister Lene Espersen stated that Denmark was not considering recognizing the State of Palestine. On 29 May, the Social Democrats revealed that if they win the next parliamentary election, they will recognize the State of Palestine.

On 15 September 2011, the Social Democrats won the 2011 Danish elections, and expressed support for the Palestinian membership in the UN, but waited for a joint decision in the European Union. On 22 September 2012, hundreds of Danes demonstrated in front of the Folketing. The Palestinian ambassador to Denmark said: "This recognition will enhance Danish-Arab relations and will reflect support of the Danish people for the Palestinian bid to UN". [sic] In October 2012, Denmark abstained from voting in the resolution for Palestine in the UNESCO.

== Danish development assistance ==
Denmark provides assistance to the occupied Palestinian Territories in the following three ways.

- Denmark continues to participate in the peace process, promoting the Roadmap for Peace among other initiatives. The PLO's Negotiations Affairs Department is on such peace building initiative which Denmark supports.
- Denmark supports the creation of a sovereign, democratic, and peaceful Palestinian state. Denmark currently supports organizations which are bringing about the preconditions for these ideals, such as fighting corruption, increasing human rights, and ensuring free and fair elections.
- Denmark seeks to improve the living conditions in Palestine through supporting private sector development. Denmark is currently supporting smaller local councils in the Jenin area through amalgamation and capacity building. An increase in economic integration between the West Bank and Israel is also a goal of the Danish.
- In May 2017, the Palestinian Authority via its organisation Women's Affairs Technical Committee (WATC) named a women's center in the town of Burqa after Mughrabi (a wellknown militant) and celebrated her as a role model. The center was built with the aid of the government of Norway and UN Women. The Danish Ministry of Foreign Affairs started its own investigations of WATC and found it had withheld central information about the naming of the centre and terminated the working relationship with WATC. As a result of the findings, the Danish ministry also ceased its funding of 23 other NGOs in Palestine as of 1 January 2018.

== Palestinians in Denmark ==
In the 1980s, during the Lebanese Civil War, 19,000 Palestinian refugees fled to Denmark. 1000 of them were from Lubya.

== See also ==
- Foreign relations of Denmark
- Foreign relations of Palestine
- Palestine-EU relations
- AL-EU relations
- Denmark–Israel relations
- Ahmad Abu Laban
