= Yehuda Gaulan =

Israeli Ambassador to Greece from 1970 until 1974

Yehuda Gaulan (Hebrew: יהודה גולן; born 1909, date of death unknown) was the Israeli Ambassador to Greece from 1970 until 1974; minister to Denmark in 1954, Consul General in Montreal from 1954 until 1957 and Ambassador to Finland from 1960 to 1964.

Gaulan also served as Israel’s Chief of Protocol.
