= Mordechai Namir =

Israeli politician (1897–1975)

- מרדכי נמיר
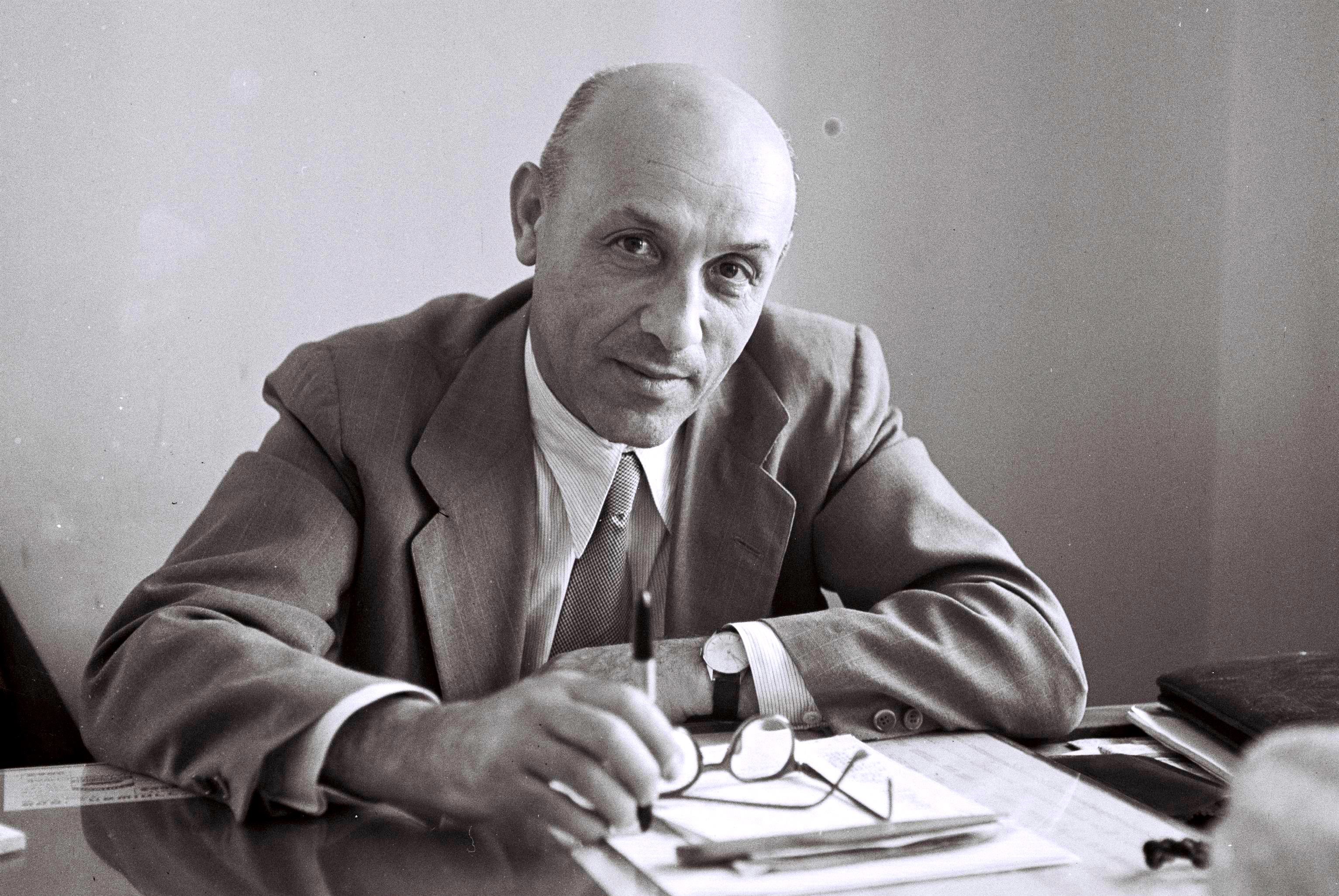

Ministerial roles
- 1956–1959: Minister of Labour

Faction represented in the Knesset
- 1951–1965: Mapai
- 1965–1968: Alignment
- 1968–1969: Labor Party
- 1969: Alignment

Personal details
- Born: 23 February 1897 Nemyriv, Russian Empire
- Died: 22 February 1975 (aged 77)

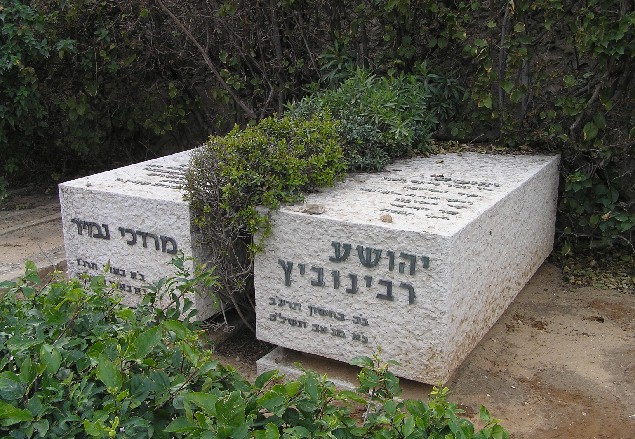
Tomb of Namir and fellow mayor of Tel Aviv Yehoshua Rabinovitz in the Trumpeldor cemetery.

Mordechai Namir (Hebrew: מרדכי נמיר; born Mordechai Nemirovsky; 23 February 1897 – 22 February 1975) was an Israeli politician, who served as the mayor of Tel Aviv (1959–1969), a Knesset member and government minister, as well as being one of the heads of the Labour Zionist movement.

== Biography ==
Mordechai Namir was born in Nemyriv in the Russian Empire (today in Ukraine) and studied at a heder before graduating from the Odessa University, where he studied law and economics. In 1924 he was arrested by the Soviet authorities for his work for Zionism, and upon his release made aliyah. In Mandatory Palestine, he worked for the Davar newspaper.

He was married to former Knesset Member and Minister Ora Namir.

== Political career ==
Namir became the secretary of the Ahdut HaAvoda party in 1926, a position he held until 1930. From 1929 to 1935 he also served as the director of the statistics department in the Histadrut. From 1935 he was a member of Tel Aviv's city council and from 1936, secretary of the workers' union in the city. Additionally, he was a member of the Haganah command in the city and later in all of Mandatory Palestine.

Between 1949 and 1950 he was also on a diplomatic mission to Eastern Europe and Moscow, about which he wrote a book in 1971 (A Mission in Moscow: A Honeymoon and Years of Wrath).

From 1950 to 1956, Namir served as the general secretary of the Histadrut. He was elected to the Knesset on behalf of Mapai in 1951 and remained an MK until 1969, when the 6th Knesset was disbanded. During this time he was also the CEO of the government-owned construction company Amidar (1959-59) and Minister of Labour from 1956 until 1959.

Namir served as mayor of Tel Aviv between 1960 and 1969, when he was succeeded as mayor by Yehoshua Rabinovitz.

== Commemoration ==
Part of a major expressway in Tel Aviv, (Highway 2, is called Derekh Namir) and the city has a square bearing his name.
