= Church of Saint Mary, Vishnyeva =

Catholic church in Minsk Region, Belarus

Church of Saint Mary
- Касцёл Адведзінаў Найсвяцейшай Панны Марыі
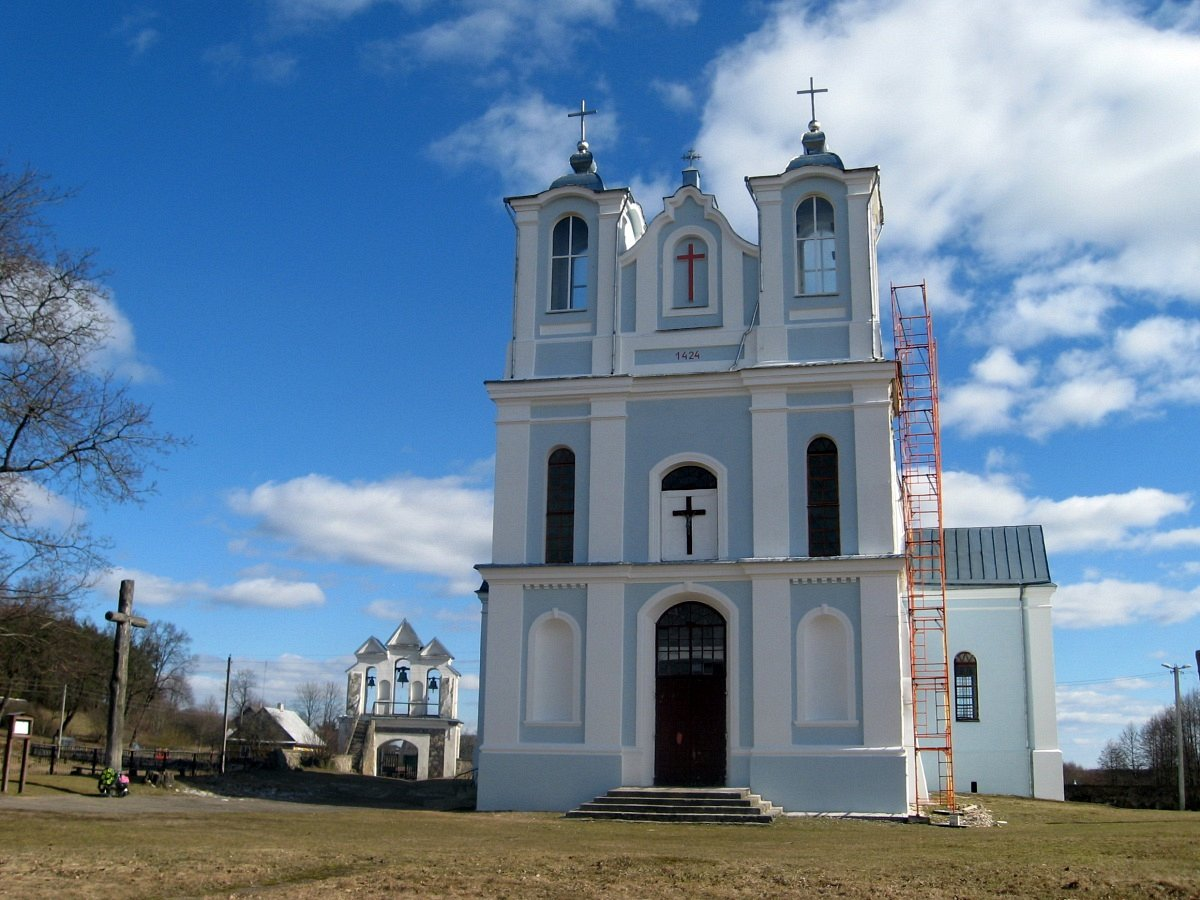
- Church of Saint Mary
- 54.1422°N 26.2099°E
- Location: Vishnyeva
- Country: Belarus
- Denomination: Catholic Church (Latin Church)

History
- Founder: Jerzy Chreptowicz

Architecture
- Style: Baroque
- Years built: 1637—1641

Administration
- Diocese: Archdiocese of Minsk–Mohilev

The Church of Saint Mary in Vishnyeva is a Catholic parish church in Minsk Region, Belarus. It was constructed in 1637–1641 on the banks of Holszanka river. The church is listed as a Belarus Cultural Heritage object.

== History ==
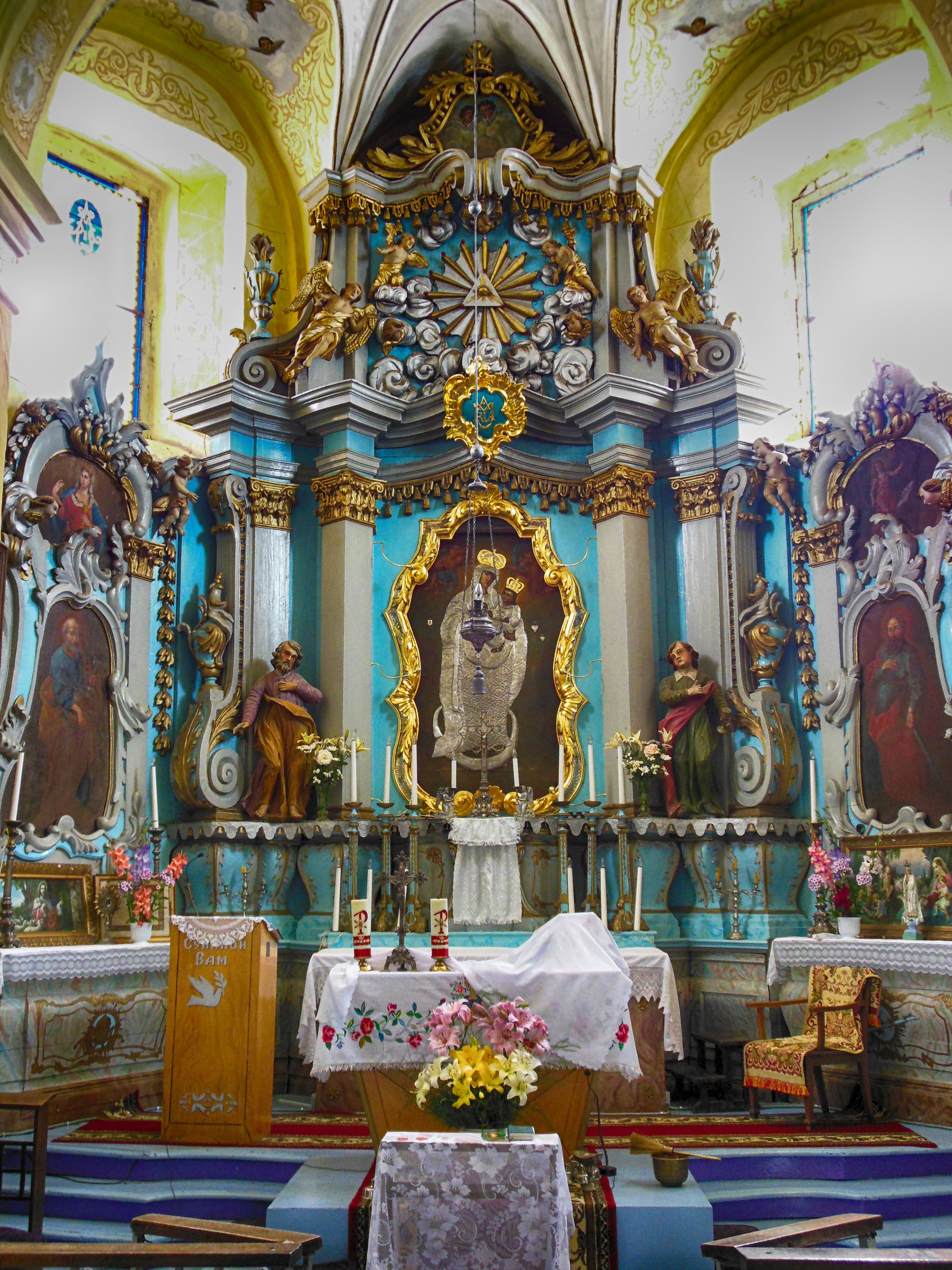
The main altar in 2012

The first Catholic parish in Vishnyeva was established in the 15th century by Vytautas the Great, in 1424 a wooden church was built by Petras Gedgaudas. The stone church was constructed in 1637–1641 on donations of Nowogródek Voivoda Jerzy Chreptowicz and consecrated in honor of the Visitation. After his death, Jerzy Chreptowicz was buried in the church's crypt.

In 1771 the church was restored after fire on donations of the philanthropist Adam Chreptowicz. In that period two sacristies were added to the altar part.

In 1906 the church was reconstructed again, a narthex and two square-shaped towers were added to the main building. The interiors were painted by the Polish artist Ferdynand Ruszczyc

Unlike the majority of the churches of the former Russian Empire, the Church of Saint Mary in Vishnyeva was not closed during the Soviet times.

== Gallery ==
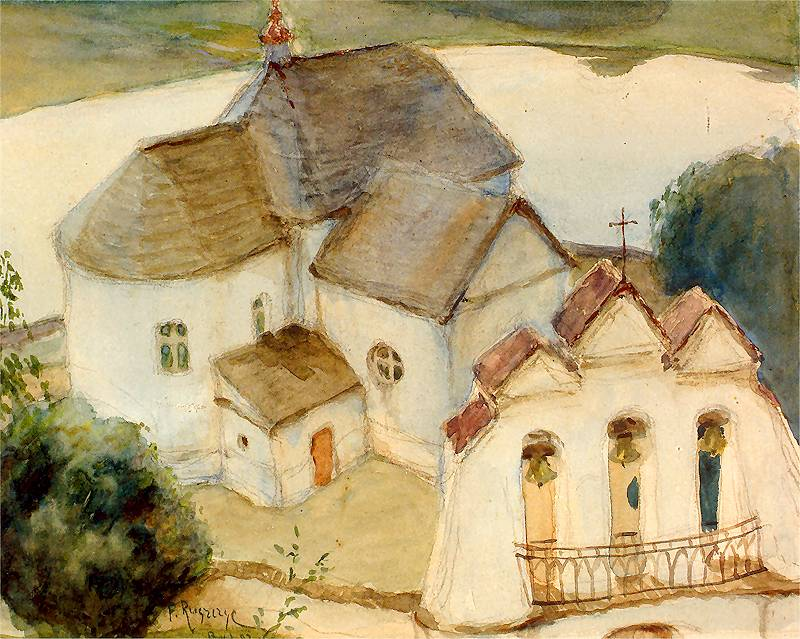
Watercolor by Ferdynand Ruszczyc, 1902

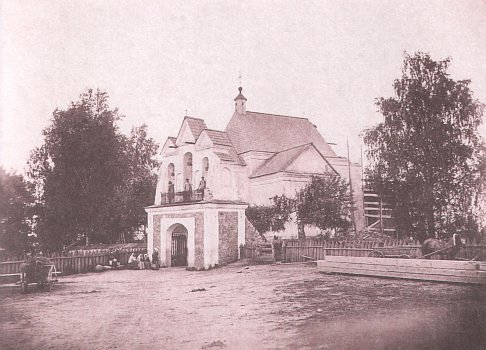
Photo circa 1900

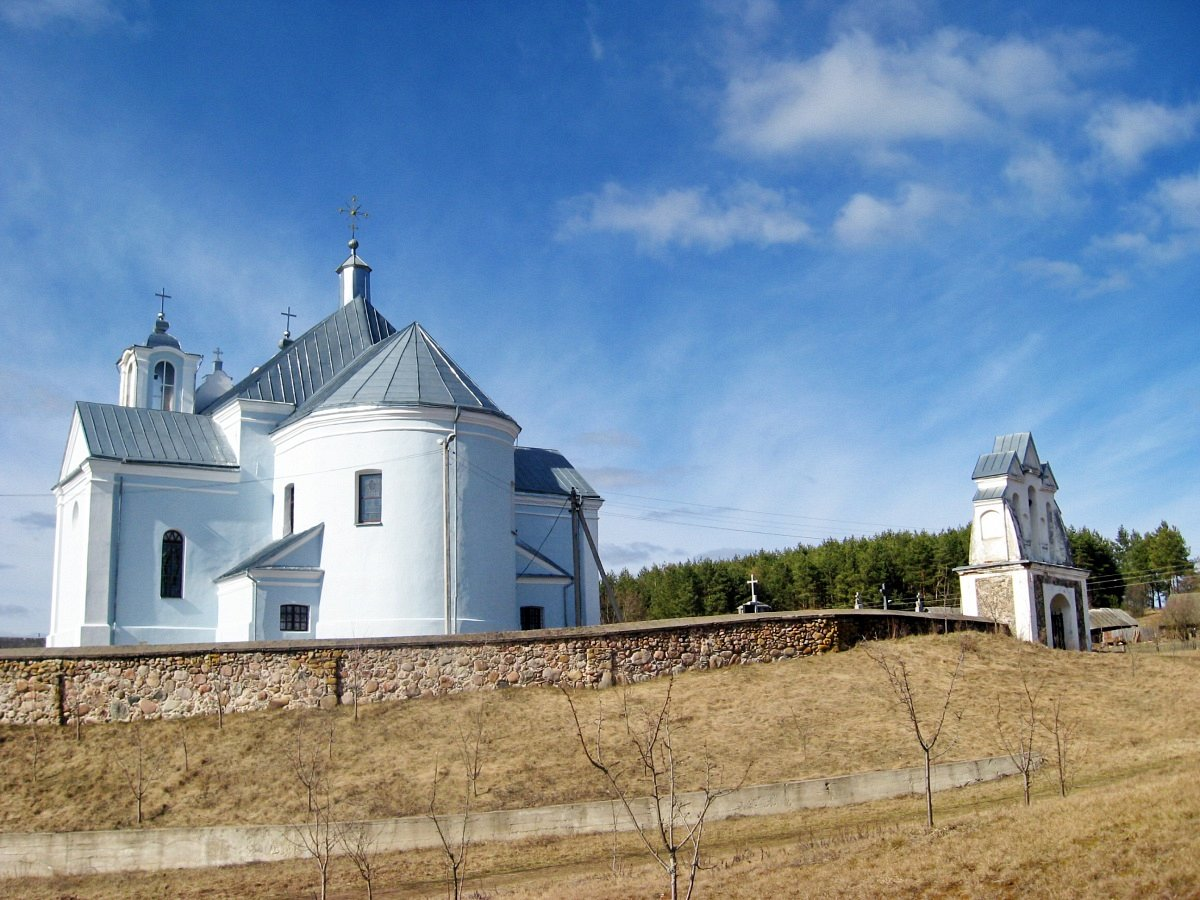
The church in 2015

== Sources ==
- Kulagin, A. M. (1993). Архітэктура Беларусі. Энцыклапедычны даведнік» [Belarusian Architecture: Encyclopedia]. Minsk: «Беларуская Энцыклапедыя імя Петруся Броўкі». p. 132. ISBN 5-85700-078-5.
- Gabrus, T. V. (2001). Мураваныя харалы: сакральная архітэктура беларускага барока [Painted Chorals: Religious Architecture of Belarusian Baroque]. Minsk: «Ураджай». p. 287. ISBN 985-04-0499-X.
