= Benny Dagan =

Israeli diplomat

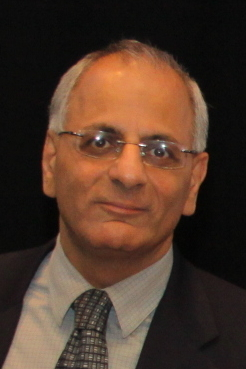
Benny Dagan (2012)

Benny Dagan (Hebrew: בני דגן; born January 2, 1957) is the former Israeli Ambassador to Denmark. He also served as Ambassador of Israel to Sweden (2008-2012) prior to which he was the deputy head of the Center for Policy Research at the Israel Ministry of Foreign Affairs, and head of the Middle East Affairs Bureau of the Center (2003–2008).

== Biography ==
Dagan was born in Israel in 1957. He graduated from the Gymnasia Rehavia high school in Jerusalem in 1975, joined the Israel Defense Forces and was released from service in 1979 with the rank of lieutenant. In 1984 Dagan received a Bachelor's degree in Middle East history and political science from the Hebrew University of Jerusalem.

== Career ==
Dagan joined Israel's foreign service in 1985. He held various positions in research, political affairs and media and public relations. His postings abroad included political officer at the Embassy of Israel in Cairo (1986–1988); consul for the Mid-West region at the Consulate-General of Israel in Chicago (1988–1990); and, minister-counselor for Middle East affairs at the Embassy of Israel in Washington, D.C. (1998–2003).

At the Foreign Ministry’s headquarters in Jerusalem, Dagan held various positions in the Policy Research Center. Prior to his assignment in Washington, D.C. he was director of the Syrian and Lebanese Affairs Department. He also served in the Western European Division and in the Press Department.

== Personal life ==
Mr Dagan is currently married and has triplets: two boys and a girl.
