= Barukh Binah =

Israeli diplomat

- ברוך בינה
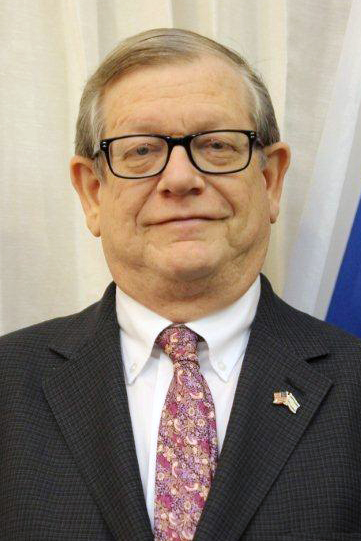
- Born: 1950 (age 75–76); Tel Aviv, Israel

Barukh Binah (Hebrew: ברוך בינה; born 1950 in Tel Aviv) is the former Israeli Ambassador to Denmark. Previously he was the Deputy Head of Mission at the Embassy of Israel in Washington, D.C., with the rank of ambassador. He has been a member of Israel's Foreign Service since 1979.

== Early and personal life ==
Barukh Binah's family history is linked closely with modern Israeli history. His great-grandfather, author Simcha Ben-Zion (Gutmann) was among the founders of Tel Aviv in 1909. His grandfather, Barukh Binah MBE (a survivor of the infamous Kishinev pogrom of 1903), served as the District Officer of Haifa and Samaria in the British mandatory government of Palestine and founded the newspaper Hadashot Mehaaretz (News from the Land), which later became the leading Israeli daily Haaretz. Binah grew up in the Negev city of Beersheba (Be'er Sheva). In 1969 he joined the Israel Defense Forces, where he served until 1974 as an analyst and a research officer. Barukh Binah holds degrees with honors in History, Middle Eastern Studies, Political Science and Strategic Studies from the Hebrew University of Jerusalem, Haifa University and Israel's National Defense College (where he wrote his dissertation, “Israel and the American Jewish Community: a Brotherhood in Distress”). Binah served as The Secretary of the Israel Oriental Society and contributed to literary periodicals. He keeps his literary activity to date: in 2017 he published his book "It Only Seems to be Healing" (Hebrew poetry). He also published a translation of Rupert Brook's "The Soldier"

== Diplomatic career ==
Barukh Binah joined the Israeli Ministry of Foreign Affairs in 1979. In 1985, he was appointed Israel's Spokesman and Press Officer in New York.

From 1991 to 1992, Binah served as the Director of the Press Division and Spokesman of the Ministry of Foreign Affairs. In 1992, he was assigned to the Embassy of Israel in Washington, D.C., as Counselor for Congressional Affairs, later becoming the Embassy's Minister-Counselor for Public Affairs. From 1999 to 2001, Binah served as Director of Congressional Affairs and Consulates in the United States. He also held a variety of research and policy planning positions, including Comptroller of Research Quality. From 2001 to 2005, he served as the Head of the International Affairs Bureau in the Center for Political Research of the Foreign Ministry.

In 2005, Binah was appointed as Israel's Consul General to the Midwest, based in Chicago, a post he held until 2008. In this capacity, he published many Op-Ed pieces. On April 2, 2008, at the conclusion of his service, Binah was honored by the Illinois General Assembly for his service. In 2008, Binah was appointed the Deputy Director General for North America in charge of relations with the United States and Canada at the Ministry of Foreign Affairs in Jerusalem. He served in this capacity until January 2012.

In November 2011, Binah was called to serve in Washington once again, as the Deputy Head of Mission at the Embassy of Israel, with the personal rank of ambassador. In this capacity, he has addressed many organizations including the General Assembly of the Jewish Federations of North America, The Israel Project and AIPAC. In March 2012, Binah became the first Israeli official to speak at the J Street Conference where he told attendees "We need you to stand with us … It is as simple as that and someone ought to say it. Internal activism is a central part of democratic society, but pressures on the elected government of Israel can present us with a problem, davka (especially) when we need you the most".

In October 2012, the Ministry of Foreign Affairs announced that Binah would be named Israel's Ambassador to Denmark in the summer 2013. He presented his credentials in September 2013. In 2018 he retired from public service.
