= Vishnyeva =

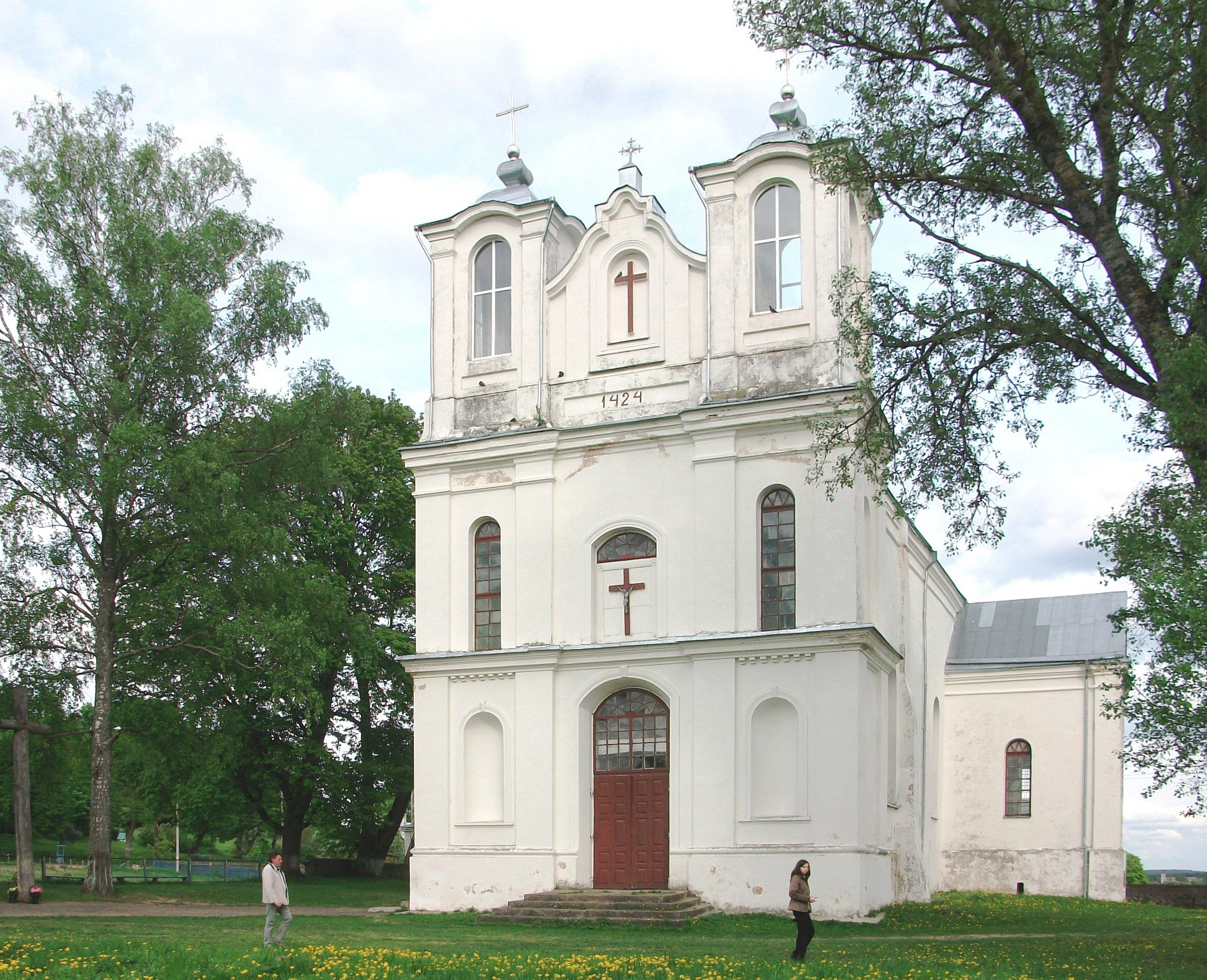
- Catholic Church of Saint Mary

- Location within Belarus
- Coordinates: 54°8′N 26°14′E
- Country: Belarus
- Region: Minsk
- District: Valozhyn
- Time zone: UTC+3 (MSK)

Vishnyeva (Belarusian: Ві́шнева, romanized: Víšnieva; Russian: Ви́шнево, romanized: Víshnevo; Polish: Wiszniewo; Lithuanian: Vyšniavas; Yiddish: ווישנעווע, romanized: Vishneve) is an agrotown in the Valozhyn District of Minsk Region, Belarus, near the border with Lithuania.

== History ==
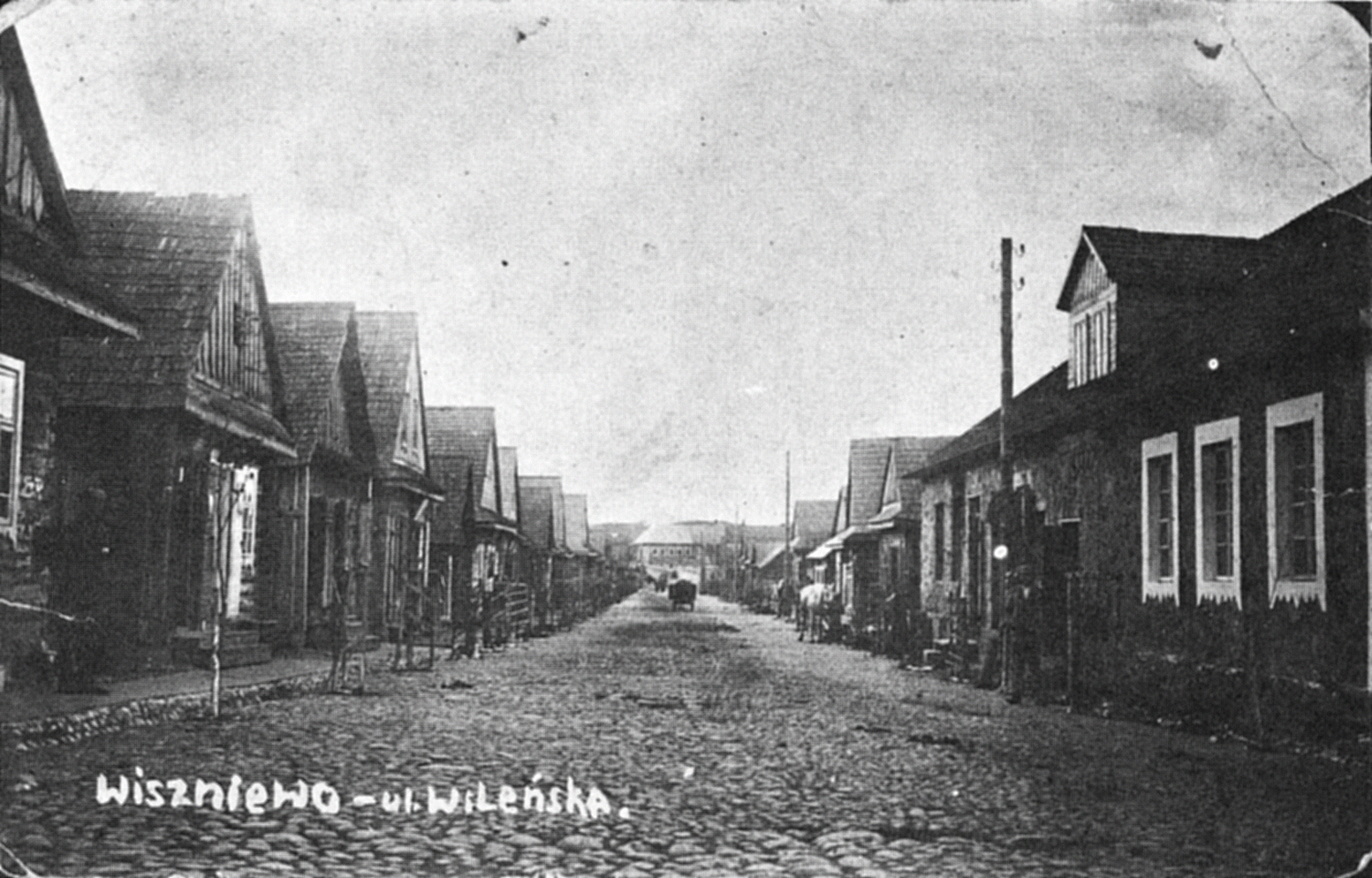
Wiszniew in interwar Poland

The town was probably established in the 14th century. It was a private town, owned by the Giedygołdowicz, Steczko and Chreptowicz noble families. The first Catholic church of Saint Mary was built in 1424 by castellan of Wilno Siemon Giedygołdowicz, and then rebuilt in Baroque style in 1637 by voivode of Nowogródek Jerzy Chreptowicz. Joachim Chreptowicz founded a sub-departmental high school subordinate to the Wilno University. Around 1790, an iron blast furnace was built.

After the Partitions of Poland, the town was annexed by Imperial Russia. In 1859, it had 72 households, totalling 900 people, of which 500 were Jews. In 1897, it had a population of 2,650, including the rural neighbourhood, of which 1,463 were Jews. The population of Vishnyeva in 1907 was 2,650, of which 1,863 were Jews. After World War I, it was part of reborn independent Poland, within which it was the seat of a gmina in the Wołożyn County in the Nowogródek Voivodeship. In the 1921 census, 46.2% people declared Polish nationality, 44.7% declared Jewish nationality, and 8.9% declared Belarusian nationality.

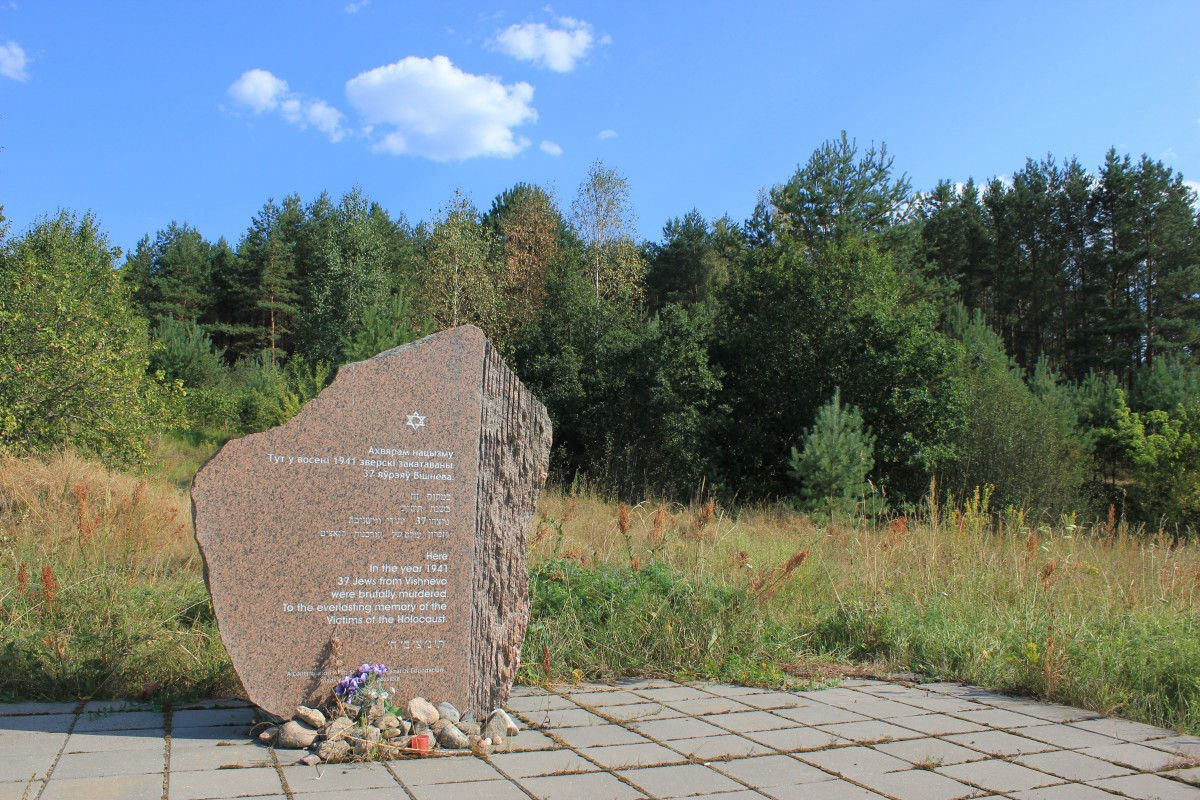
Holocaust memorial at the site of Vishnyeva Jewish cemetery

Following the joint German-Soviet invasion of Poland, which started World War II in September 1939, the town was occupied by the Soviet Union until 1941, and then by Nazi Germany until 1944. The Germans established the Vishnyeva Ghetto, which included 1,100 men, women, children and infants, and all were burnt alive by the Nazis and their local collaborators in the Vishnyeva Synagogue on 22 September 1942. Among those killed on that day was the grandfather of Shimon Peres, who later became President of Israel. Some Jews were taken to the ghetto in the nearby town of Wołożyn (Valozhyn) and killed there. Remains of a Jewish cemetery can be located in the town. A few survivors have emigrated to Israel and to other countries. In 1944, the town was reoccupied by the Soviet Union, which eventually annexed it from Poland the following year.

== People ==
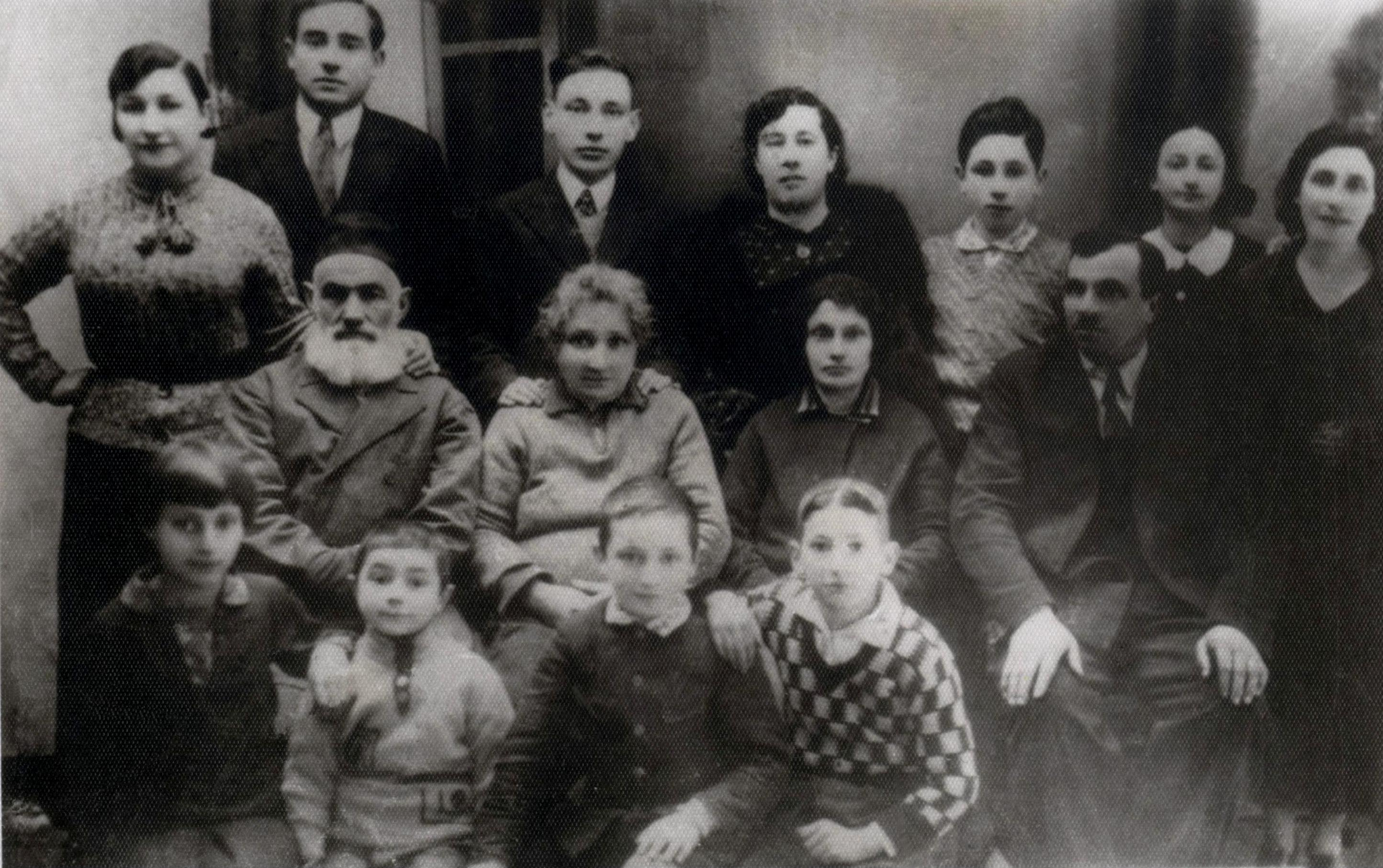
Shimon Peres (standing, third from right) with his family, ca. 1930

The small town was the place of death of Symon Budny. Four centuries later, it was the birthplace of Shimon Peres, the former President of Israel, who emigrated to Mandatory Palestine with his family in 1934, Vishnyeva was also the birthplace of Yehoshua Rabinovitz, who served as the Finance Minister of the State of Israel and the Mayor of Tel-Aviv; of Nahum Goldman, who was the founder and president of the World Jewish Congress, and of the Dudman family, of which Yadin Dudai is an internationally renowned leader in neuroscience.

== Landmarks ==
- Church of Saint Mary, built in 1637—1641, is an example of Baroque style and listed as Belarus Cultural Heritage object.

== Notable residents ==
- Nahum Goldmann (1895–1982), founder and president of the World Jewish Congress, and president of the World Zionist Organization
- Shimon Peres (born Szymon Perski; 1923–2016), prime minister of Israel and president of Israel
- Yehoshua Rabinovitz (1911–1979), Israeli mayor of Tel Aviv.
