= Yitzhak Eldan =

Israeli diplomat

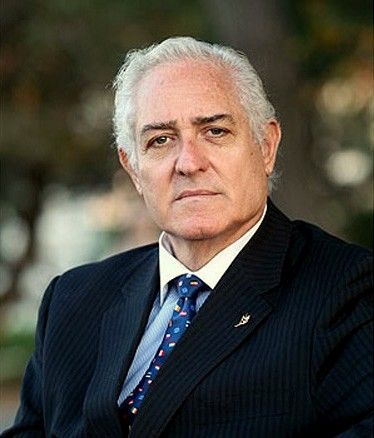

Israeli Ambassador to Denmark
- In office 1999–2001

Israeli Ambassador to UNESCO
- In office 2001–2003

Israeli Ambassador to The Council of Europe
- In office 2001–2003

Personal details
- Born: October 30, 1943 Casablanca, Morocco
- Profession: Diplomat and Professor

Yitzhak Eldan was born on October 30, 1943. He is an Israeli diplomat as well as a former Israeli Ambassador. He has served, among other postings, as the Israeli Ambassador to Denmark, to the Council of Europe and UNESCO, as well as Head of State Protocol for Israel and Director of the Israeli Diplomatic school. In 2011, he founded The Ambassadors’ Club of Israel, non-government organization with the goal to connect Ambassadors to Israel, and continues to serve as its President. In addition, since 2013 he has been directing The Israeli School for Young Ambassadors. Lecturer on Diplomacy, Hebrew University, Jerusalem.

== Biography ==
Yitzhak (Danino) Eldan was born in Casablanca, Morocco. After finishing Alliance Elementary School at the age of 12, he joined the Bnei Akiva Youth Movement. At the end of 1955, he left his family and immigrated to Israel in February 1956 with the Youth Aliyah Movement. Until 1961, he was educated in the Regional Sde Elyahu School while living on Kibbutz Tirat Zvi in the Beit She'an Valley. In 1961, he joined his family, who had also immigrated to Israel and settled in Moshav Barak near Afula. He completed his secondary education in 1963 at Afula High School.

From 1963 to 1965, Yitzhak Eldan served in the Israel Defense Forces and, after completing army service, he studied at The Hebrew University of Jerusalem. In 1968 he graduated with a Bachelor of Arts degree in political science, majoring in international relations and the history of the Middle East. In 1972, he completed two years of study at the master's degree level, majoring in African studies. In 2002 he received his Master of Arts degree in international relations from École des hautes études en sciences sociales, EHESS.

Yitzhak Eldan joined the Ministry of Foreign Affairs in 1970. He served in various bilateral and multilateral posts in North American and European embassies and consulates. His first mission in 1974 was to Houston, Texas, as deputy consul to the Southwestern United States. In 1975, he was posted to Paris, France, as press officer and Israeli spokesman for the Israeli Embassy in France. In 1983, he was posted in Montreal as consul to Quebec and the Maritime Provinces of Canada. In 1985 after three years in the ice belt he was posted as deputy consul general in Los Angeles in charge of Southern California and the US Southwestern States.

In 1990, he was reposted to Paris as deputy ambassador with the grade of minister plenipotentiary. During this time, for a period of six months, he also served as the acting Israeli ambassador to France. In addition, he served as Israel's representative to UNESCO and the Council of Europe. During those years, very important international events took place that greatly impacted the work of the Israeli embassy in France. Among the events were The Gulf War, The Oslo Accords, and The Abou Daoud Terrorist Affair.

In 1999 Yitzkak Eldan was nominated for the first time as ambassador to Denmark. This post also included responsibility for Greenland and the Faroe Islands. During this posting Ambassador Eldan's most important duty was to defend Israel's position during the Second Intifada in face of the growing criticism from Denmark.

In 2001 he moved to Paris where he was nominated as ambassador to UNESCO and the Council of Europe in Strasbourg. At UNESCO his main task was to stop Arab and pro Arab resolutions against Israel from being renewed automatically. At the same time he advanced a positive Israeli agenda between Israel and UNESCO in the fields of education, culture and science. At the Council of Europe, he acted to support the work of the Knesset on political and civilian issues.

Between his missions abroad Yitzhak Eldan served at Israel's Ministry of Foreign Affairs in Jerusalem. Among his most important posts were the director of training and human resources planning in 1994. His responsibilities included the training of Israeli diplomats, especially those in the Cadet Course. The purpose of this training was to empower the diplomats in dealing with the peace process. He was also in charge of ensuring the postings of Israeli diplomats to the new Israeli embassies in the Arab world and the former Soviet Union.

In 2003 Yitzhak Eldan was chosen by Foreign Minister Silvan Shalom to become Israel's Chief of State Protocol. This position included the responsibility to assist the Government interministerial committee for Emblems and Ceremonials, to organize official international ceremonies and visits for international dignitaries and diplomats, to be responsible for foreign diplomats residing in Israel, and to oversee the nominations of honorary consuls to the State of Israel. Yitzhak Eldan served in this post until 2010. He is the longest-serving diplomat in this post.

During his diplomatic career Yitzhak Eldan was involved in special diplomatic missions. Among them were the negotiations on Normalization of Relations with Egypt and the participation in the Follow up Committee after Operation Grapes of Wrath in Lebanon.

On October 30, 2010, and after more than 40 years of diplomatic service, he retired from the Ministry of Foreign Affairs as Ambassador for Life. In January 2011 he founded the Ambassadors’ Club of Israel and serves since then as its president. In 2013 Ambassador Eldan became the director of The Israeli School for young ambassadors, which is part of the Israeli Centre for Young Leaders. He is also an international strategic consultant.

== Awards ==
- 1994 Award of Excellence from the Israeli Ministry of Foreign Affairs for his diplomatic performances.
- 1994 Award of Excellence from the State of Israel Civil Service for his contribution as a civil servant.
- 2023 Award of Excellence from P.A.M, the Parliamentarian Assembly of the Mediterranean for the “Olive Tree Road of Israel”.

== Decorations ==
- 1989 Palmes Academiques from the Government of France for his contribution to the cultural relationship between France and Israel
- 2009 The Roaring Lion Award from the Israeli Association of Public Relations and Spokesmanship for the Olive Tree Road of Israel
- 2009 The Ordine Della Stella Delia Solidarieta Italiana for his contribution to relations between Italy and Israel
- 2010 The Jerusalem Medal for his contribution to the international Jerusalem image

== Publications ==
- The Ethical Code of the Ministry of Foreign Affairs, Basic Values and Norms of Behavior, 1997.
- To Be a Diplomat in Israel, a Guide for New Foreign Diplomats, 2008.
- The Map of the Olive Tree Route in Israel, 2008
- The Non Stop Diplomat:Memoir published by 'Ophir Bikurim', Israel, 2024.
