= Mina Ben-Zvi =

Commander in the Israeli Defense Force(1909-2000)

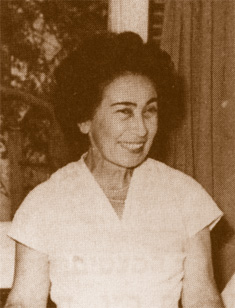
- Mina Ben-Zvi (1948)
- Native name: מינה בן-צבי
- Born: Mina Rogozik; 1909; Velyki Mezhyrichi, Rivne Oblast, Ukraine
- Died: 2000 (aged 90–91)
- Branch: Israel Defense Forces
- Service years: 1933–1958
- Rank: Tat aluf (Brigadier General)
- Commands: Women's Corps of the Israel Defense Forces
- Conflicts: 1947–1949 Palestine war
- Other work: Diplomat, women's rights activist

Mina Ben-Zvi (Hebrew: מינה בן-צבי; 1909-2000) was the first commanding officer of the Israeli Defense Forces’ Women's Corps.

== Biography ==
Mina Ben-Zvi was born as Mina Rogozik in 1909 in Ukraine (Velyki Mezhyrichi, Rivne Oblast). In 1921 she moved with her family to Mandatory Palestine. After completing her education, in 1933, at the age of 24, she joined the Haifa branch of the Haganah.

During the World War II, she was among the first 66 women in Mandate Palestine to join the Auxiliary Territorial Service of the British Army. She subsequently became a commander of a British unit in Egypt with a rank of captain. When the 1948 war started she was appointed as the first commander in chief of the women's corps of Israel Defense Forces. In 1953, she joined her husband Eliyahu Ben-Zvi on a diplomatic mission to Finland from 1953 to 1955. Later she was appointed as Israel's representative to the UN Commission on the Status of Women (1956–1958).

In 1960 Golda Meir established Mount Carmel International Training Center in collaboration with Ben-Zvi, and Inga Thorsson, a Swedish diplomat, who later became Sweden's Ambassador to Israel. Ben-Zvi became the founding director of Mount Carmel International Training Center, and served as its director for a period of 25 years.

According to Heller, she worked "for advancing women's rights worldwide." She died in 2000.
