= Deaths in April 2024 =

The following is a list of notable deaths in April 2024.

Entries for each day are listed alphabetically by surname. A typical entry lists information in the following sequence:

- Name, age, country of citizenship at birth, subsequent country of citizenship (if applicable), reason for notability, cause of death (if known), and reference.

== April 2024 ==
=== 1 ===
- Paliath Ravi Achan, 96, Indian cricketer (Travancore-Cochin, Kerala).
- Shantilata Barik, 65, Indian singer, cancer.
- Beatrice Bartlett, 95, American historian.
- Bob Bercich, 87, American football player (Dallas Cowboys).
- Lou Conter, 102, American naval commander, last survivor of the sinking of the USS Arizona, heart failure.
- Anne Innis Dagg, 91, Canadian zoologist and author.
- Vontae Davis, 35, American football player (Miami Dolphins, Indianapolis Colts, Buffalo Bills).
- Reza Davood Nejad, 43, Iranian actor (The Accused Escaped, Reza, Without Her) and television presenter, complications from sepsis and liver surgery.
- Pedro Deleon Guerrero, 80, Northern Mariana Islands politician, member (1984–1994) and speaker (1990–1994) of the house of representatives, cancer.
- Phil Delire, 67–68, Belgian music producer.
- Thomas Farr, 69, American attorney, heart disease.
- Sylvia Fein, 104, American painter and author.
- Sergio Fernández Fernández, 85, Chilean politician, minister of the interior (1978–1982, 1987–1988), comptroller general (1977–1978) and twice senator, cancer.
- Joe Flaherty, 82, American actor (SCTV, Freaks and Geeks, Happy Gilmore), writer, and comedian.
- Gisela Gaytán, 37, Mexican politician, shot.
- José Trinidad González Rodríguez, 80, Mexican Roman Catholic prelate, auxiliary bishop of Guadalajara (1997–2015).
- Han Decai, 90, Chinese lieutenant general.
- Gennady Khripel, 74, Russian politician, senator (1996–2007).
- Cal Larson, 93, American politician, member of the Minnesota House of Representatives (1967–1975) and Senate (1987–2007).
- Sami Michael, 97, Iraqi-born Israeli writer (All Men are Equal – But Some are More, A Handful of Fog, A Trumpet in the Wadi) and human rights activist.
- Janez Orešnik, 88, Slovene linguist.
- Ed Piskor, 41, American comic book artist (Hip Hop Family Tree, Wizzywig, X-Men), suicide.
- Gene Raesz, 83, American football player (Edmonton Eskimos).
- Alejandro Semenewicz, 74, Argentine footballer (Morón, Independiente, national team), heart attack.
- Rosemarie Simmen, 85, Swiss pharmacist and politician, member of the Council of States (1987–1999).
- Zdzisław Skrzeczkowski, 93, Polish basketball player (Legia Warsaw, ŁKS Łódź, national team).
- Vera Svoboda, 87, Croatian singer.
- Anne Vétillard, 60–61, French role-playing game creator.
- Michael Ward, 57, American musician (The Wallflowers, School of Fish), complications from diabetes.
- Pete Wilk, 58, American baseball coach (Vermont Lake Monsters), brain cancer.
- George Wingert, 92, American politician, member of the Kansas House of Representatives (1971–1978).
- Mohammad Reza Zahedi, 63, Iranian military officer, commander of NEHSA (2005–2006) and NEZSA (2006–2008), airstrike.
- Eduardo Zuleta, 88, Ecuadorian tennis player.

=== 2 ===
- Jerry Abbott, 81, American songwriter and record producer (Pantera).
- Julius Adler, 93, American biochemist.
- John Barth, 93, American writer (The Sot-Weed Factor, Giles Goat-Boy, Lost in the Funhouse).
- Kevin Batiste, 57, American baseball player (Toronto Blue Jays).
- Eugenio Bozzello Verole, 95, Italian politician, senator (1979–1992).
- Erich Brenter, 83, Austrian skibobber.
- Veljko Bulajić, 96, Montenegrin film director (Train Without a Timetable, Kozara, Great Transport).
- Ali Chiroma, 91, Nigerian trade unionist, president of the Nigeria Labour Congress (1984–1988).
- Doros Christodoulidis, 78, Cypriot cardiologist and politician, MP (1991–2006), MEP (2004).
- R. E. Clements, 94, British Old Testament scholar.
- Maryse Condé, 90, French novelist (Segu, Windward Heights, The Gospel According to the New World), critic and playwright.
- Edward B. Curtis, 91, American mathematician.
- Christopher Durang, 75, American playwright (Sister Mary Ignatius Explains It All for You, Vanya and Sonia and Masha and Spike), complications from aphasia.
- David Egilman, 71, American physician and editor (International Journal of Occupational and Environmental Health).
- Thérèse Gouin-Décarie, 100, Canadian academic and psychologist.
- Göran Hagberg, 76, Swedish footballer (Östers IF, AIK, national team).
- Christopher Hewetson, 86, English Anglican priest, archdeacon of Chester (1994–2002).
- Jim Hopson, 73, Canadian football player (Saskatchewan Roughriders) and executive, president and CEO of the Saskatchewan Roughriders (2005–2015), colon cancer.
- Alena Hromádková, 80, Czech social scientist, politician and academic.
- Türker İnanoğlu, 87, Turkish film director and television producer (Yabancı Damat).
- Dodik Jégou, 89, French ceramist, painter, and poet.
- Michael C. Jensen, 84, American economist.
- Ji Liangnian, 89, Chinese chemist.
- Tatyana Konyukhova, 92, Russian actress (Over Tissa, Balzaminov's Marriage, Moscow Does Not Believe in Tears).
- Li Xilin, 93, Chinese general, commander of the Guangzhou Military Region (1992–1996).
- Gerhard Lohfink, 89, German Catholic priest and theologian.
- Larry Lucchino, 78, American attorney and baseball executive (Boston Red Sox, Baltimore Orioles, San Diego Padres), four-time World Series champion, heart failure.
- Judd Matheny, 53, American politician, member of the Tennessee House of Representatives (2002–2018).
- Yagutil Mishiev, 97, Russian-Israeli historian.
- John Moyes, 77, English cricketer (Cumberland, Suffolk).
- Thomas Nisbett, 98, Bermudian Anglican priest.
- Juan Vicente Pérez, 114, Venezuelan supercentenarian, world's oldest living man (since 2022).
- C. J. Prentiss, 82, American politician, member of the Ohio House of Representatives (1991–1998) and Senate (1999–2006).
- Sade Robinson, 19, American homicide and dismemberment victim. (death announced on this date)
- Andrew Rudd, 74, American investor and financial academic.
- Peter Schey, 76, American lawyer, complications from cancer.
- John Sinclair, 82, American poet, heart failure.
- Notker Wolf, 83, German Benedictine priest-monk, abbot primate of the Benedictine Confederation (2000–2016), heart attack.
- Jaap Wolterbeek, 80, Dutch photographer and cinematographer.
- Zhang Lixiong, 110, Chinese major general and politician, deputy (1975–1978).

=== 3 ===
- Joe Aitken, 79, Scottish bothy ballad singer, cancer.
- Omirbek Baigeldi, 84, Kazakh politician, äkim of Jambyl Region (1992–1995), member (1995–2011) and chairman (1996–1999) of the Senate.
- Paolo Caccia, 86, Italian psychologist and politician, deputy (1979–1994).
- Stefano Cherchi, 23, Italian jockey, complications from a head injury.
- Luke Fleurs, 24, South African footballer (Ubuntu Cape Town, SuperSport United), shot.
- Ian Keith Harris, 88, Australian composer.
- Albert Heath, 88, American jazz drummer (Heath Brothers), leukemia.
- Richard Heyn, 81, Sri Lankan cricketer (Burgher Recreation Club) and hockey player (national team).
- Joan Hollobon, 104, Welsh-born Canadian writer and journalist (The Globe and Mail).
- Vitus Huonder, 81, Swiss Roman Catholic prelate, bishop of Chur (2007–2019).
- Ida Jimmy, 78, Namibian independence activist and politician.
- Kalevi Kiviniemi, 65, Finnish concert organist, heart attack.
- Mike Kolen, 76, American football player (Miami Dolphins), Super Bowl winner (VII, VIII).
- Muñequita Milly, 23, Peruvian folk singer, complications from surgery.
- Hisashi Miura, 93, Japanese lawyer and politician, MP (1972–1976, 1979–1986, 1990–1993).
- Sándor Müller, 75, Hungarian footballer (Vasas, Hércules, national team).
- Gaetano Pesce, 84, Italian architect and designer.
- Kaset Rojananil, 90, Thai military officer, commander-in-chief of the air force (1989–1992) and supreme commander of the armed forces (1992), co-leader of the 1991 coup d'état.
- Raihan Akhter Banu Roni, 72, Bangladeshi MP (2001–2006).
- Adrian Schiller, 60, English actor (Victoria, The Last Kingdom, The Danish Girl).
- Philippe Sellier, 92, French literary critic.
- Gadilbek Shalakhmetov, 80, Kazakh journalist and politician, MP (2004–2007).
- Patti Starr, 82, Canadian public servant (Patti Starr affair).
- Michael Tanner, 88, British philosopher and opera critic.
- Vera Tschechowa, 83, German actress (Widower with Five Daughters, Euridice BA 2037, And That on Monday Morning), director, and screenwriter.

=== 4 ===
- Sunday Akpata, 87, Nigerian Olympic long jumper (1964).
- Bruce Armstrong, 67, Australian sculptor (Owl).
- Kaia Arua, 33, Papua New Guinean cricketer (national team).
- Lynne Reid Banks, 94, British author (The Indian in the Cupboard, The L-Shaped Room), cancer.
- Larry Beightol, 81, American football coach (Louisiana Tech Bulldogs), complications from heart failure, dementia and diabetes.
- Iona Campagnolo, 91, Canadian politician, lieutenant governor of British Columbia (2001–2007) and MP (1974–1979).
- Dan Cohen, 87, American author, businessperson and politician, member (1965–1969) and president (1967–1969) of the Minneapolis City Council.
- Victor Corpus, 79, Filipino military and intelligence officer.
- Vivek Dhakar, 47, Indian politician, Rajasthan MLA (2018), suicide.
- Steve Duggan, 76, Irish Gaelic footballer (Ballyhaise, Cavan).
- Erika Enzenhofer, 97, Austrian Olympic gymnast (1948).
- Zsuzsa Ferge, 92, Hungarian sociologist.
- Thomas Gumbleton, 94, American Roman Catholic prelate, auxiliary bishop of Detroit (1968–2006).
- Les Hughson Jr., 85, Australian rules footballer (Fitzroy).
- Bruce Kessler, 88, American director (The Gay Deceivers, The Monkees, McCloud) and racing driver.
- Bob Lanigan, 81, Australian rugby league player (Newtown Jets).
- Keith LeBlanc, 69, American drummer (Little Axe, Tackhead) and music producer ("No Sell Out").
- R. F. Lucchetti, 94, Brazilian screenwriter (The Strange World of Coffin Joe, The Strange Hostel of Naked Pleasures, Hallucinations of a Deranged Mind), respiratory failure.
- Adela Montes, 95, Argentine entertainment journalist.
- K. H. Nandasena, 69, Sri Lankan politician, MP (since 2020).
- Russell Newcombe, 66, British substance use researcher, lung cancer.
- Danny O'Donnell, 85, Scottish footballer (Brentford, Brechin City, Dumbarton). (death announced on this date)
- Dorothy O'Neil, 93, American badminton player.
- Adrián Peña, 48, Uruguayan politician, deputy (2015–2020), twice senator and minister of environment (2020–2023), traffic collision.
- Hella Pick, 94, Austrian-born British journalist (The Guardian, New Statesman).
- Abu Maria al-Qahtani, 47, Iraqi Islamic militant, emir of Al-Nusra Front (2012–2017), assassination.
- Michael Dewayne Smith, 41, American convicted murderer, lethal injection.
- Miron Sycz, 64, Polish teacher and politician, MP (2007–2015).
- Abubakar Tabuni, 28, Indonesian separatist militant, leader of the West Papua National Liberation Army, shot.
- Chris Williams, 61, Welsh historian, heart attack.
- Pat Zachry, 71, American baseball player (Cincinnati Reds, New York Mets, Los Angeles Dodgers), World Series champion (1976).
- Vytautė Žilinskaitė, 93, Lithuanian writer.

=== 5 ===
- Márcia Denser, 74, Brazilian writer and journalist (Nova).
- Mahammed Dionne, 64, Senegalese politician, prime minister (2014–2019).
- John Louis, 82, English motorcycle speedway rider (national team).
- Gerda Martín, 96, Chilean Olympic javelin thrower (1952).
- Vatslav Mikhalsky, 85, Russian writer.
- Cecil Murray, 94, American pastor and theologian.
- Phil Nimmons, 100, Canadian jazz clarinetist.
- Toni Ann Palermo, 91, American baseball player (Chicago Colleens, Springfield Sallies).
- Péter Schumann, 69, Hungarian footballer (Újpesti Dózsa, Váci Izzó, Tatabányai Bányász).
- C. J. Snare, 64, American musician (FireHouse) and songwriter ("Love of a Lifetime", "When I Look into Your Eyes"), colon cancer.
- Peter Sodann, 87, German actor (Tatort, Gundermann), theater director and politician.
- Ahmad Fathi Sorour, 91, Egyptian politician, speaker of the House of Representatives (1990–2011) and minister of education (1986–1990).
- Suryatna Subrata, 84–85, Indonesian military officer and politician.
- Jaan Tooming, 78, Estonian actor (November) and film director.
- Herold Truffer, 87, Swiss Olympic ice hockey player (1964).

=== 6 ===
- Anestis Afentoulidis, 82, Greek footballer (PAOK, Kastoria).
- Akebono Tarō, 54, American-born Japanese sumo wrestler, professional wrestler (AJPW, NJPW), and kickboxer (K-1), heart failure.
- Joel Breman, 87, American epidemiologist, kidney cancer.
- Joseph E. Brennan, 89, American politician, governor (1979–1987) and attorney general (1975–1979) of Maine, member of the U.S. House of Representatives (1987–1991).
- Donald Bruneski, 87, Canadian Olympic alpine skier (1960).
- Pranavjyoti Deka, 84, Indian writer and geologist.
- Dutty Dior, 27, Norwegian rapper.
- Ernesto Gómez Cruz, 90, Mexican actor (La venida del Rey Olmos, La Víspera, The Crime of Padre Amaro).
- Doug Hoyle, Baron Hoyle, 98, British politician, MP (1974–1979, 1981–1997) and member of the House of Lords (1997–2023).
- Serhii Konoval, 31, Ukrainian activist and soldier, Hero of Ukraine.
- Halilu Kundila, 59, Nigerian politician, member of the Kano State House of Assembly.
- Dinh Q. Lê, 56, Vietnamese-American multimedia artist.
- José Alberto Martín-Toledano, 61, Spanish politician, mayor of Malagón (1991–2003) and deputy (2011–2019).
- Francisco Pérez, 90, Uruguayan Olympic cyclist (1964).
- Lothar Prehn, 77, German footballer (VfB Speldorf, Bayer 05 Uerdingen).
- N. Pugazhenthi, 71, Indian politician, Tamil Nadu MLA (since 2021).
- Dickie Rooks, 83, English football player (Middlesbrough, Bristol City, Sunderland) and manager.
- Italo Rota, 70, Italian architect (Museo del Novecento).
- Sir Ian Stoutzker, 95, British banker and philanthropist.
- Esko-Juhani Tennilä, 76, Finnish politician, MP (1975–2011).
- Chadwick A. Tolman, 85, American chemist.
- Kåre Venn, 88, Norwegian forest pathologist.
- Gerhard Welz, 79, German footballer (1. FC Köln, Tennis Borussia Berlin).
- John Buck Wilkin, 77, American singer-songwriter ("GTO").
- Ziraldo, 91, Brazilian author (O Menino Maluquinho), painter, and journalist.

=== 7 ===
- Aderounmu Adejumoke, 40, Nigerian actress (Dazzling Mirage, Industreet, Jenifa's Diary).
- Jaroslav Bašta, 75, Czech politician and diplomat, deputy (1996–2000, since 2021), ambassador to Russia (2000–2005), Charter 77 signatory.
- Michael Boder, 65, German conductor (Vienna State Opera, Liceu, Royal Danish Theatre).
- Marcel André Boisard, 84, Swiss intellectual and diplomat.
- Edgar Burcksen, 76, Dutch film editor (The Young Indiana Jones Chronicles, The Hollywood Sign, School of Life), heart attack.
- Chryssie Lytton Cobbold, Baroness Cobbold, 83, British aristocrat and organiser of the Knebworth Festival, pancreatic cancer.
- Barbara Czarniawska, 75, Polish scholar.
- Walid Daqqa, 62, Palestinian novelist and activist, complications from cancer.
- Michael Dingake, 96, Motswana politician, MP (1994–1999).
- Keith Drury, 78, American theologian.
- Nancie Fadeley, 93, American politician, member of the Oregon House of Representatives (1971–1981).
- John Allen Fraser, 92, Canadian politician, speaker of the House of Commons (1986–1994).
- Gérard Gaudron, 74, French politician, deputy (2007–2012) and mayor of Aulnay-sous-Bois (2003–2008).
- John Giles, 97, British Olympic athlete (1948, 1952).
- Jerry Grote, 81, American baseball player (New York Mets, Los Angeles Dodgers, Kansas City Royals), World Series champion (1969), respiratory failure.
- Pat Hennen, 70, American motorcycle racer, Finnish Grand Prix, 500cc winner (1976).
- Clarence "Frogman" Henry, 87, American singer ("Ain't Got No Home", "(I Don't Know Why) But I Do", "You Always Hurt the One You Love"), complications from surgery.
- Harry Lee Hudspeth, 88, American jurist, judge (1979–2016) and chief judge (1992–1999) of the U.S. District Court of Western Texas.
- Joe Kinnear, 77, Irish football player (Tottenham Hotspur, national team) and manager (Wimbledon), complications from vascular dementia.
- Aleksandr Kovalyov, 81, Russian politician, governor of Voronezh Oblast (1992–1996), mayor of Voronezh (2000–2003).
- Antonette Mendes, 79, Indian singer, actress (Amchem Noxib, Nirmon, Mohabbat Zindagi Hai), and playwright.
- Kathleen Okubo, 71, Filipino journalist.
- Rickey Parkey, 67, American boxer, IBF world cruiserweight champion (1986–1987).
- William F. Pepper, 86, American lawyer and conspiracy theorist, pneumonia.
- Rex, 76–77, American artist and illustrator. (death announced on this date)
- Bernard Richards, 92, British computer scientist.
- Ralph Rodríguez, 82, Puerto Rican Olympic sport shooter.
- Silento Rodriguez, 90, Mexican-American professional wrestler.
- Edward Ryder, 75, American politician, member of the Ohio House of Representatives (1971–1972), cancer.
- Lori and George Schappell, 62, American conjoined twins.
- Toby Simkin, 59, English theatrical producer.
- Joe Viera, 91, German jazz saxophonist and educator, founder of the Internationale Jazzwoche Burghausen.
- Bruce W. Wessels, 77, American materials scientist.
- Wong Liang Hun, 70, Singaporean Olympic fencer (1992), cancer.
- Karen Yarbrough, 73, American politician, member of the Illinois House of Representatives (2001–2012), Cook County clerk (since 2018).
- Zhong Binglin, 72, Chinese academic administrator and politician, president of Beijing Normal University (2001–2012).

=== 8 ===
- José Antonio Ardanza, 82, Spanish politician, lehendakari (1985–1999).
- Burton Armus, 89, American actor (Kojak), writer and television producer (NYPD Blue, Star Trek: The Next Generation)
- Keith Barnes, 89, Welsh-born Australian Hall of Fame rugby league player (Balmain Tigers, New South Wales, national team), coach and commentator.
- Yorick Blumenfeld, 91, Dutch-born British writer.
- André Boniface, 89, French Hall of Fame rugby union player (Dax, Mont-de-Marsan, national team).
- Jon Card, 63, German-born Canadian drummer (SNFU, D.O.A., Subhumans).
- Domingo Casco, 75, Argentine Olympic boxer.
- Hugo de los Reyes Chávez, 91, Venezuelan politician, governor of Barinas (2000–2008).
- Noble David Cook, 82-83, American historian and author.
- Bob Ellison, 91, American television consultant (Becker, Wings, The Mary Tyler Moore Show), screenwriter and producer.
- Bright Esieme, 31, Nigerian footballer (Enyimba).
- Sir Paul Fox, 98, British television producer (BBC Television), complications of a stroke.
- Jaak Gabriëls, 80, Belgian politician, mayor of Bree (1977–2012) and MP (1995–1999).
- Bill Gunter, 89, American politician, Florida state treasurer (1976–1989), member of the U.S. House of Representatives (1973–1975) and Florida Senate (1966–1972).
- George Heussenstamm, 97, American composer.
- Peter Higgs, 94, British theoretical physicist, discoverer of the Higgs boson, Nobel Prize laureate (2013).
- Ann Trevenen Jenkin, 93, British writer.
- Carter Lindberg, 86–87, American historian.
- Ron Lord, 94, Australian footballer (Sydney Prague, national team).
- Johnny Macknowski, 101, Russian-born American basketball player (Syracuse Nationals).
- Sir Stephen Oliver, 85, British judge.
- Ralph Puckett, 97, American Army officer, Medal of Honor recipient.
- Victor Riley, 49, American football player (Kansas City Chiefs, New Orleans Saints, Houston Texans).
- Christiane Scrivener, 98, French politician, MEP (1979–1989).
- Ilie Șerbănescu, 81, Romanian economist.
- Melitha Sidabutar, 23, Indonesian singer, heart failure.
- Frances Steinwedell, 89, American equestrian.
- Lubert Stryer, 86, American academic.
- Sue Stultz, 71, Canadian politician, New Brunswick MLA (2010–2014).
- Alexey Tsatevich, 34, Russian professional road bicycle racer.

=== 9 ===
- Vladimir Aksyonov, 89, Russian cosmonaut (Soyuz 22, Soyuz T-2).
- Jack Alabaster, 93, New Zealand cricketer (Otago, national team).
- Jaime de Armiñán, 97, Spanish screenwriter and film director (My Dearest Senorita, The Nest, The Love of Captain Brando).
- Patti Astor, 74, American actress (Underground U.S.A., Wild Style) and gallerist (Fun Gallery).
- Carla Balenda, 98, American actress (Sealed Cargo, The Mickey Rooney Show, Lassie).
- Moisés Barack, 80, Peruvian football manager (Unión Huaral, Deportivo Garcilaso, national team).
- John Boyd, 90, British police officer, HM Chief Inspector of Constabulary for Scotland (1993–1996).
- William J. Byron, 96, American Jesuit priest, president of the University of Scranton (1975–1982) and Catholic University of America (1982–1992).
- Martin Chambers, 59, Scottish Roman Catholic priest, bishop-elect of Dunkeld (since 2024).
- Alfonso Chardy, 72, Mexican-born American journalist (The Miami Herald), heart attack.
- Marcia Colish, 86, American historian.
- John Dekker, 94, Dutch-born American Christian missionary.
- Eckart Dux, 97, German actor (The Merry Wives of Windsor, Mailman Mueller, Don't Forget Love).
- Paola Gassman, 78, Italian actress (Let's Have a Riot).
- Alasdair Macintosh Geddes, 89, British medical doctor.
- Saratu Gidado, 56, Nigerian actress.
- William Herbert Hunt, 95, American oil billionaire.
- Sheila Isham, 96, American printmaker, painter and book artist, pneumonia.
- Carolyn Laffan, 56, Australian arts curator.
- Bob Lanese, 82, American trumpeter (James Last Orchestra).
- John C. Martin, 80, American attorney and jurist, judge of the North Carolina Court of Appeals (1985–1988, 1993–2014).
- Gianni Meccia, 92, Italian composer, singer and actor (Ragazzi del Juke-Box, Nel blu, dipinto di blu, Howlers in the Dock).
- Dave Mehmet, 63, English football player (Millwall, Gillingham) and manager, stroke.
- Muluken Melesse, 70, Ethiopian singer and drummer.
- Karl Momen, 90, Swedish architect and painter.
- Tony Morgan, 92, British sailor, Olympic silver medallist (1964)
- Sturgis Nikides, 66, American guitarist (Low Society, Cool It Reba), cancer.
- Harry Paynter, 96, Australian rules footballer (Collingwood).
- Paolo Pininfarina, 65, Italian car designer, CEO of Pininfarina (since 2008).
- Dieter Rexroth, 83, German musicologist and dramaturge (Deutsches Symphonie-Orchester Berlin, Young Euro Classic).
- Edna Solodar, 94, Israeli politician, MK (1982–1992).
- Pascal Suleiman, Lebanese politician, shot. (body discovered on this date)
- Nathan Templeton, 44, Australian television journalist (Sunrise).
- Terto, 77, Brazilian footballer (Santa Cruz, São Paulo, Ferroviário), heart attack.
- R. M. Veerappan, 97, Indian film producer and screenwriter (Deiva Thai, Naan Aanaiyittal, Kannan En Kadhalan) and politician, Tamil Nadu MLA (1986–1996).
- Bernard Weisberger, 101, American historian.
- Max Werner, 70, Dutch singer and drummer (Kayak).

=== 10 ===
- Gordon Balser, 70, Canadian politician, Nova Scotia MLA (1998–2003).
- Brian Barnes, 90, British Olympic swimmer (1952).
- Marian Costea, 71, Romanian Olympic ice hockey player (1976, 1980).
- Thelma Dorantes, 74, Mexican actress.
- David Goodstein, 85, American physicist.
- Robert R. Holt, 106, American psychologist and peace activist.
- Mohammed Ibrahim Idris, 54, Nigerian politician, member of the house of representatives (2011–2015).
- Mikael Janicki, 39, Swedish murder victim.
- Kim Jelbart, 86, Australian Olympic rower (1960).
- Fumio Kurokawa, 91, Japanese animator (Science Ninja Team Gatchaman).
- Gordon Lund, 83, American baseball player (Cleveland Indians, Seattle Pilots).
- Mister Cee, 57, American DJ (WNBM), complications from diabetes.
- Frank Olson, 91, American business executive, complications from COVID-19.
- Junior Pope, 39, Nigerian actor (Professor Johnbull), drowning.
- Gankhüügiin Pürevbat, 59, Mongolian painter and art collector.
- Bo Ratliff, 80, American singer.
- Trina Robbins, 85, American comic book artist and writer (It Ain't Me, Babe, Wimmen's Comix, Wonder Woman), stroke.
- Richard Rosser, Baron Rosser, 79, British trade unionist and politician, member of the House of Lords (since 2004).
- Eric Sievers, 66, American football player (San Diego Chargers, New England Patriots, Los Angeles Rams), bladder cancer.
- O. J. Simpson, 76, American Hall of Fame football player (Buffalo Bills) and actor (The Naked Gun, The Towering Inferno), Heisman Trophy winner (1968), prostate cancer.
- Kim Taplin, 80, British poet and writer. (death announced on this date)
- Ted Toleman, 86, British motor racing executive, founder of Toleman, heart attack.
- Mawuena Trebarh, 52, Ghanaian investor, CEO of Ghana Investment Promotion Centre (2013–2017).
- Tusa Misi Tupuola, Samoan politician, MP (2011–2016). (death announced on this date)
- Bate Urgessa, 41, Ethiopian politician, shot.
- Dan Wallin, 97, American sound engineer (Woodstock, A Star Is Born, Star Trek).

=== 11 ===
- Bernard Baudoux, 95, French fencer, Olympic silver medalist (1956).
- Meg Bennett, 75, American screenwriter (The Bold and the Beautiful, Sunset Beach) and actress (General Hospital), cancer.
- Bert Chaney, 96, American politician, member of the Kansas House of Representatives (1967–1972) and Senate (1973–1984).
- Rudi Dekkers, 67, Dutch businessman and criminal.
- Knud Enggaard, 94, Danish politician, MP (1964–1977, 1979–1981, 1984–1988).
- Fat Cat, 20, Chinese internet personality, suicide by jumping.
- Robin Field, 88, British composer.
- Anton Flešár, 79, Slovak footballer (Dukla Prague, Lokomotíva Košice, Czechoslovakia national team).
- Peter Fulde, 88, German physicist and quantum chemist.
- Tony Jones, 53, American professional wrestler (APW, XPW, WWE).
- Anna-Greta Leijon, 84, Swedish politician, minister of gender equality (1973–1976), employment (1982–1987) and twice of justice.
- Enrique Llácer Soler, 89, Spanish percussionist and composer.
- Harry Marcoplos, 98, American Olympic field hockey player (1948, 1956).
- Sergio Melnick, 72, Chilean politician and economist, minister of planning (1987–1989) and councilman of Las Condes (since 2021).
- Yasuo Muramatsu, 91, Japanese voice actor (One Piece, Case Closed, Mobile Suit Gundam).
- Jack Nix, 95, American football player (San Francisco 49ers, Saskatchewan Roughriders).
- Segundo Olmedo, 75, Panamanian Olympic wrestler.
- Ogbonnaya Onu, 72, Nigerian politician, minister of science (2015–2022) and governor of Abia State (1992–1993).
- Park Bo-ram, 30, South Korean singer.
- Penny Simkin, 85, American physical therapist and childbirth educator, co-founder of DONA International.
- Jeannette Sinclair, 96, English soprano.
- Paddy Summerfield, 77, British photographer.
- Shigeharu Ueki, 69, Japanese football player (Fujita Industries, national team) and manager (Montedio Yamagata).
- Lorena Velázquez, 86, Mexican actress (Santo vs. las Mujeres Vampiro, Fray Don Juan, Mujer, Casos de la Vida Real).
- War Chant, 27, American Thoroughbred racehorse, Breeders' Cup Mile winner (2000).
- Lawrence Whalley, 78, British psychiatrist.
- Ted Wilson, 84, American politician, mayor of Salt Lake City (1976–1985), complications from heart failure and Parkinson's disease.
- Martin J. Wygod, 84, American businessman and racehorse breeder.
- Milan Žurman, 63, Slovene football player (Maribor, Rudar Velenje) and manager (Kapfenberger SV).

=== 12 ===
- Benjamin Achimeir, 14, Israeli shepherd, blunt force trauma.
- Lavern Ahlstrom, 87, Canadian politician.
- Roberto Cavalli, 83, Italian fashion designer and inventor.
- Richard M. Christensen, 91, American engineer and academic.
- Colin W. Clark, 92, Canadian mathematician and behavioral ecologist.
- Eleanor Coppola, 87, American filmmaker (Hearts of Darkness: A Filmmaker's Apocalypse, Paris Can Wait, Love Is Love Is Love).
- Isabelle Coutant-Peyre, 70, French lawyer, cancer.
- Kamala Das, 78, Indian politician, Odisha MLA (1990–2004).
- Adolf Dinglreiter, 88, German politician, member of the Landtag of Bavaria (1986–2003).
- Don Donoher, 92, American Hall of Fame college basketball coach and athletics administrator (Dayton Flyers).
- Ruben Douglas, 44, American basketball player (New Mexico Lobos, Panionios, Valencia).
- Olga Fikotová, 91, Czech-American discus thrower, Olympic champion (1956), breast cancer.
- Peter Förtig, 90, German composer and music theorist.
- Růžena Košťálová, 100, Czechoslovak Olympic sprint canoeist (1948).
- Edward Lipiński, 93, Polish-Belgian Orientalist and biblical scholar.
- Robert MacNeil, 93, Canadian-American Hall of Fame journalist (PBS NewsHour) and host (America at a Crossroads).
- Joseph Reynders, 94, Belgian Olympic swimmer (1948, 1952).
- Carrie Robbins, 81, American costume designer (Grease, Yentl), complications from COVID-19.
- Betinho Rosado, 75, Brazilian politician, deputy (1995–2015).
- Patt Shea, 93, American television writer (Archie Bunker's Place, Gloria, All in the Family).
- John Steane, 92, British headmaster and archaeologist.
- Jeffrey Veregge, 50, American Klallam artist, heart attack.

=== 13 ===
- Joseph A. Bracken, 94, American philosopher and Catholic theologian.
- Larry Brown, 84, American baseball player (Cleveland Indians, Oakland Athletics, Baltimore Orioles).
- Joanna Dworakowska, 45, Polish chess player.
- Richard Horowitz, 75, American film composer (Three Seasons, The Sheltering Sky, Any Given Sunday).
- W. R. Johnson, 90, American classicist.
- Giovanni Battista Judica-Cordiglia, 84–85, Italian amateur radio operator.
- Charles F. Mertens, 91, American politician, member of the North Dakota House of Representatives (1971–1990).
- Paulino Monsalve, 65, Spanish field hockey player, Olympic silver medallist (1980).
- Ian Morison, 80, British astronomer and astrophysicist.
- Austin Murphy, 96, American politician, member of the U.S. House of Representatives (1977–1995) and Pennsylvania State Senate (1971–1977), two-time member of the Pennsylvania House of Representatives.
- Klaus Wolfgang Niemöller, 94, German musicologist.
- Rochelle Oliver, 86, American actress (Who's Afraid of Virginia Woolf?, Scent of a Woman, Law & Order) and acting coach.
- Lorenzo Palomo, 86, Spanish composer.
- Ian Parmenter, 78, Australian television host and chef (Consuming Passions).
- Angela Redgrave, 106, British dance teacher.
- Morten Rieker, 83, Norwegian Olympic sailor (1976).
- Faith Ringgold, 93, American artist and author (Tar Beach).
- Stephanie Sparks, 50, American golfer and television personality.
- Ron Thompson, 83, American actor (Baretta, Cargo, American Pop).
- Ângelo Victoriano, 56, Angolan four-time Olympic Hall of Fame basketball player.
- Barry Waddell, 87, Australian cyclist.
- John Warnaby, 63, British actor (Les Misérables, The Raven, Ali G Indahouse) and priest.

=== 14 ===
- Crandell Addington, 85, American Hall of Fame poker player.
- George L. Atkins, 82, American politician, Kentucky state auditor (1975–1979), mayor of Hopkinsville, Kentucky (1972–1975).
- Philip Attipoe, 62, Ghanaian Olympic sprinter (1984).
- Marcello Costa, 84, Italian-born Australian medical researcher.
- Dennis Covington, 75, American author (Salvation on Sand Mountain), complications from Lewy body dementia.
- Carl Crane, 84, American politician, member of the Louisiana House of Representatives (1982–2007).
- Nancy Neveloff Dubler, 82, American bioethicist and attorney, heart and lung disease.
- Diana Edwards-Jones, 91, Welsh television director.
- Ben Eldridge, 85, American five-string banjo player (The Seldom Scene).
- Giannis Fertis, 85, Greek actor (Electra, Slaves in Their Bonds).
- Vincent Friell, 64, Scottish actor (Trainspotting, Restless Natives, The Angels' Share).
- Trixie Gardner, Baroness Gardner of Parkes, 96, Australian-born British politician, member of the House of Lords (since 1981).
- Kenneth W. Harrow, 80, American scholar.
- Steffen Heitmann, 79, German politician, minister of justice of Saxony (1990–2000) and member of the Landtag (1994–2009), complications from Parkinson's disease.
- Boris Kayser, 85, American theoretical physicist.
- Calvin Keys, 82, American jazz guitarist, stroke.
- A. M. Krishnamurthy, 66, Indian politician, Puducherry MLA (2001–2006).
- Beverly LaHaye, 94, American Christian activist and author, founder of Concerned Women for America.
- Willie Limond, 45, Scottish boxer and footballer (Albion Rovers), complications from a seizure.
- Jacques Lussier, 64, Canadian actor (Intimate Power, Louis 19, King of the Airwaves, Grey Owl).
- Ma Weizhi, 94, Chinese lieutenant general, chief of staff for the Jinan Military Region (1988–1990).
- Larry Masterson, 73, Irish television producer.
- Sam Nolan, 93, Irish trade unionist and political activist.
- Lloyd Omdahl, 93, American politician, North Dakota lieutenant governor (1987–1992).
- Frank O'Neill, 70, Irish footballer (Cobh Ramblers, Cork Celtic).
- Käthe Sasso, 98, Austrian child resistance activist.
- Steve Sloan, 79, American football player (Alabama Crimson Tide, Atlanta Falcons) and coach (Texas Tech Red Raiders).
- Werner Spitz, 97, German-American forensic pathologist.
- Luciano Sušanj, 75, Croatian Olympic runner (1976) and politician, MP (1990–1992, 2000–2003).
- Paul Tirone, 73, American politician, member of the Massachusetts House of Representatives (2001–2003).
- Doru-Viorel Ursu, 71, Romanian politician, minister of the interior (1990–1991).
- A.E. Walsby, 82-83, British microbiologist.
- Blackie Wangerin, 89, American racing driver.
- Mohan R. Wani, 59, Indian biologist.
- Margaret Williams, 73, British film and television director.
- Yan Wenming, 91, Chinese archaeologist.

=== 15 ===
- Martin Aliker, 95, Ugandan political advisor and academic administrator, chancellor of Gulu University (2004–2014).
- Adriano Aprà, 83, Italian film critic and director.
- Pavel Balakshin, 87, Russian politician, governor of Arkhangelsk Oblast (1991–1996), senator (1993–1996), and mayor of Arkhangelsk (1996–2000).
- Noël del Bello, 81, French racing driver.
- Joseph Boum, 34, Cameroonian footballer (Mersin İdmanyurdu, Antalyaspor, Zira FK). (death announced on this date)
- Cleuber Brandão Carneiro, 84, Brazilian politician, deputy (1999–2007).
- Kim Christensen, 71, American journalist (Los Angeles Times, The Orange County Register), Pulitzer Prize winner (1996, 2010), cancer.
- Mehmet Coral, 77, Turkish novelist.
- Constantin Corduneanu, 54, Romanian Olympic wrestler (1992, 1996).
- Abdoulaye Diawara, 43, Ivorian footballer (KSK Beveren, PFC).
- Lowell Dittmer, 82, American political scientist and author.
- J. A. Garcia Jr., 87, American politician, member of the Texas House of Representatives (1968–1972).
- Mouncif El Haddaoui, 59, Moroccan footballer (AS Salé, national team).
- Casimiro Hernández Calvo, 82, Spanish politician, senator (1986–2000).
- Whitey Herzog, 92, American Hall of Fame baseball player (Washington Senators), executive (New York Mets), and manager (St. Louis Cardinals), World Series champion (1969, 1982).
- Robert Hessen, 87, American historian (Steel Titan, In Defense of the Corporation).
- Ken Holtzman, 78, American baseball player (Chicago Cubs, Oakland Athletics, New York Yankees), World Series champion (1972, 1973, 1974), heart disease.
- Bernd Hölzenbein, 78, German footballer (Eintracht Frankfurt, Memphis Americans, West Germany national team), world champion (1974), complications from dementia.
- R. Indira Kumari, 73, Indian politician, Tamil Nadu MLA (1991–1996).
- Anatoly Kvochur, 71, Russian test pilot.
- Josip Manolić, 104, Croatian politician, prime minister (1990–1991) and speaker of the Chamber of Counties (1993–1994).
- Mario Menéndez Rodríguez, 87, Mexican journalist (Por Esto!).
- Gerard Murphy, 73, Irish politician, TD (2002–2007).
- Suzanne Norwood, 98, English jurist.
- Tom Okurut, 64, Ugandan environmental activist.
- Pavlo Petrychenko, 31, Ukrainian soldier and public activist, killed in action.
- Naomi Polani, 96, Israeli actress (Someone to Run With).
- Ángela Ragno, 92, Argentine actress (Night of the Pencils, Kisses on the Forehead, Empty Nest).
- Noel Ratcliffe, 79, Australian golfer.
- Reita, 42, Japanese bassist (The Gazette).
- David Roselle, 84, American mathematician and academic administrator, president of the University of Kentucky (1987–1989) and University of Delaware (1990–2007).
- Pedro Rubiano Sáenz, 91, Colombian Roman Catholic cardinal, bishop of Cúcuta (1971–1983), archbishop of Cali (1985–1994) and Bogotá (1994–2010).
- Cristoforo Russo, 45, Italian painter.
- Jerry Savelle, 77, American televangelist and author.
- Peter Smith, 80, English cricketer (Oxfordshire).
- Atle Ørbeck Sørheim, 90, Norwegian veterinarian and civil servant.
- Jadwiga Staniszkis, 81, Polish sociologist, political scientist and essayist, complications from Alzheimer's disease.
- Martin Stephens, 84, British judge.
- Matti Sutinen, 94, Finnish Olympic pole vaulter (1956, 1960).
- Hisako Terasaki, 95, American etcher.
- Derek Underwood, 78, English cricketer (Kent, national team), complications from dementia.
- Ernesto Wong, 50, Cuban-Italian baseball player and coach, crush injuries.

=== 16 ===
- Robert Merrihew Adams, 86, American philosopher.
- Vladimir Andreyev, 57, Russian race walker, Olympic bronze medallist (2000).
- A. T. Ariyaratne, 92, Sri Lankan activist, founder and president of the Sarvodaya Shramadana Movement.
- Tribert Rujugiro Ayabatwa, 83, Rwandan businessman, founder of Pan African Tobacco Group.
- James A. Burg, 82, American politician, member of the South Dakota House of Representatives (1975–1985), Senate (1985–1987), and Public Utilities Commission (1987–2005).
- Clorofila, 56, Mexican nortec musician (Nortec Collective).
- Newton da Costa, 94, Brazilian mathematician.
- Peter Davidson, 60, Australian footballer (West Coast Eagles, Brisbane Bears), cancer.
- Dwarakish, 81, Indian film director (Nee Bareda Kadambari) and actor (Bedi Bandavalu, Haddina Kannu), heart attack.
- Carl Erskine, 97, American baseball player (Brooklyn/Los Angeles Dodgers), World Series champion (1955), pneumonia.
- Rodney Gould, 81, British motorcycle road racer.
- Bob Graham, 87, American politician, governor of Florida (1979–1987), member of the U.S. Senate (1987–2005).
- Jean-Marie Haessle, 84, French-American painter.
- K. G. Jayan, 89, Indian Carnatic musician.
- Barbara O. Jones, 82, American actress (Daughters of the Dust, Freedom Road, Demon Seed).
- Bob Kloppenburg, 96, American basketball coach (Alliant International University, Donar).
- Anita Mackey, 110, American social worker.
- Dalip Singh Majithia, 103, Indian air force pilot.
- Alan Minshaw, 88, British racing driver.
- Dave Moyes, 68, Scottish footballer (Berwick Rangers, Meadowbank Thistle, Dunfermline Athletic).
- Márta Peterdy-Wolf, 101, Hungarian tennis player.
- Ellen Ash Peters, 94, American jurist, justice (1978–2000) and chief justice (1984–1996) of the Connecticut Supreme Court.
- Abdul Djalil Pirous, 92, Indonesian fine arts artist and lecturer.
- Boško Prodanović, 80, Serbian football player (Sarajevo, Yugoslavia national team) and manager (Napredak Kruševac).
- Shankar Rao, 40, Indian Maoist leader (Naxalite insurgency), shot.
- Rainer K. Sachs, 91, German-American mathematical physicist.
- Josep Maria Terricabras i Nogueras, 77, Spanish philosopher and politician, MEP (2014–2019).
- Palitha Thewarapperuma, 63, Sri Lankan politician, MP (2010–2020), electrocution.
- Keith Wainwright, 79, British hairdresser.

=== 17 ===
- Joseph Emmanuel Ackah, 89, Ghanaian politician, MP (1993–2005).
- Sue Chew, 66, American politician, member of the Idaho House of Representatives (since 2006), pancreatic cancer.
- Madhukar C. Dhas, 74, Indian-American singer-songwriter (Atomic Forest).
- Jack Disney, 93, American Olympic track cyclist (1956, 1964, 1968).
- Nilo Dzib, 67, Mexican Olympic sailor and windsurfer.
- Wally English, 89, American football coach.
- Victor Fuentealba, 101, American labor union leader, president of the American Federation of Musicians (1978–1987).
- Sir Colin Giltrap, 84, New Zealand Hall of Fame businessman and philanthropist.
- Per Henriksen, 72, Norwegian footballer (Viking, national team).
- Arvo Hilli, 93, Finnish Olympic hurdler (1952).
- Roy Davage Hudson, 93, American academic, president of Hampton Institute (1970–1976).
- Rafiu Adebayo Ibrahim, 57, Nigerian politician, senator (2015–2019) and member of the House of Representatives (2011–2015).
- René Jean, 92, French rugby league player (SO Avignon, US Entraigues XIII, national team).
- Sir Chips Keswick, 84, British merchant banker, chairman of Arsenal F.C. (2013–2020).
- Joseph Kurup, 79, Malaysian politician, MP (2008–2018), minister in the Prime Minister's Department (2013–2018) and four-time Sabah State MLA.
- Vince Lee, 85, American explorer and writer.
- Pamela Malhotra, 72, American animal sanctuary owner.
- Alf McCarthy, 73, Irish broadcaster (RTÉ) and actor (Strength and Honour).
- Fred Neulander, 82, American rabbi and convicted criminal.
- Lindsay Reeler, 63, Zambian-born Australian cricketer (New South Wales Breakers).
- Neil Rogers, 70, Australian Olympic swimmer (1972, 1976).
- Gerd Roggensack, 82, German football player (Borussia Dortmund, 1. FC Kaiserslautern) and manager (Arminia Bielefeld).
- Chiharu Saiguchi, 85, Japanese attorney and judge, stroke.
- Harry Schachter, 91, Canadian biochemist and glycobiologist.
- AJ Simon, 25, American football player (Bloomsburg Huskies, Albany Great Danes).
- Raman Subba Row, 92, English cricketer (Surrey, Northamptonshire, national team).

=== 18 ===
- Robert Basmann, 98, American econometrician.
- Dickey Betts, 80, American Hall of Fame musician (The Allman Brothers Band) and songwriter ("Jessica", "Ramblin' Man"), cancer and chronic obstructive pulmonary disease.
- Mohan Bhakri, Indian director (Apradhi Kaun?).
- Laurence Broderick, 88, British sculptor.
- Archie Cooley, 85, American college football coach (Mississippi Valley State Delta Devils, Arkansas–Pine Bluff Golden Lions, Paul Quinn Tigers).
- Aurelio Dalla Vecchia, 65, Italian Olympic sailor (1984).
- Parviz Davoodi, 72, Iranian politician, first vice president (2005–2009) and member of the Expediency Discernment Council (since 2007).
- Helen Doan, 112, Canadian supercentenarian.
- Nagalingam Ethirveerasingam, 89, Sri Lankan Olympic high jumper (1952, 1956).
- Jack Green, 73, Scottish musician (T. Rex) and songwriter, cancer.
- Yury Grekov, 80, Russian army officer.
- Wally Harris, 88, Canadian ice hockey referee.
- Glen Holden Sr., 96, American polo player and diplomat, ambassador to Jamaica (1989).
- Hong Sehwa, 76, South Korean journalist and political delegate, cancer.
- Sir Peter Hordern, 95, British politician, MP (1964–1997).
- Gérard Jacquesson, 82, French Olympic rower.
- Glen Jobson, 94, Australian Olympic field hockey player.
- Christopher Joll, 75, British military historian and author.
- Pekka J. Korvenheimo, 83, Finnish diplomat, five-time ambassador.
- Ruth Landers, 85, German-born American television producer (The Huggabug Club).
- Lee B. Laskin, 87, American attorney, politician and judge, complications from COVID-19.
- James Laurenson, 84, New Zealand actor (Pink Floyd – The Wall, Boney, The Crown).
- Mandisa, 47, American gospel singer ("Only the World", "Overcomer", "Stronger"), Grammy winner (2014).
- Yoshio Masui, 93, Japanese-Canadian cell biologist.
- Spencer Milligan, 86, American actor (Land of the Lost).
- Rui Nepomuceno, 87, Portuguese lawyer and politician, Madeira MLA.
- Francis Omondi Ogolla, 62, Kenyan air force general, chief of Defence Forces (since 2023), helicopter crash.
- Robert Oxnam, 81, American scholar (Asia Society), complications from Alzheimer's disease.
- Larry Page, 86, English pop singer, record producer ("Wild Thing"), and music manager (The Kinks, The Troggs).
- Julia Rausing, 63, British philanthropist, cancer.
- Keiko Yamamoto, 83, Japanese voice actress (Chibi Maruko-chan, Osomatsu-kun, Sazae-san), sepsis.

=== 19 ===
- Russell Bentley, 63–64, American communist fighter (Vostok Battalion). (death announced on this date)
- Adnan al-Bursh, 50, Palestinian orthopedic surgeon. (death announced on this date)
- Noé Castañón León, 76, Mexican jurist and lawyer, justice of the Supreme Court of Justice of the Nation (1985–1995).
- Daniel Dennett, 82, American philosopher and author (Brainstorms, Darwin's Dangerous Idea, From Bacteria to Bach and Back), co-founder of The Clergy Project, interstitial lung disease.
- Daphne Douglas, 99, Jamaican librarian. (death announced on this date)
- Charles Edge, American computer scientist and author.
- Muhammed Faris, 72, Syrian aviator and cosmonaut (Soyuz TM-2, Soyuz TM-3), complications from a heart attack.
- Claes Fellbom, 81, Swedish film director (The Shot, Aida), screenwriter and composer (Jeppe: The Cruel Comedy).
- Leighton James, 71, Welsh footballer (Burnley, Swansea City, national team).
- Siegfried Kirschen, 80, German football referee.
- Thawee Kraikupt, 84, Thai politician, member of the House of Representatives (1979–2000).
- Princess Lawes, 79, Jamaican politician, senator (1976–1980) and MP (1980–1989).
- Lonhro, 25, Australian Thoroughbred racehorse and sire, Australian Champion Racehorse of the Year (2004).
- Sharon Lubinski, 71, American law enforcement official.
- Ma Zhanmin, 91, Chinese lieutenant general and politician, chief of staff of the People's Liberation Army Air Force (1982–1987).
- David McCarty, 54, American baseball player (Minnesota Twins, San Francisco Giants, Boston Red Sox), World Series champion (2004), cardiac arrest.
- Alex McMillan, 91, American politician, member of the U.S. House of Representatives (1985–1995).
- Naomy, 46, Romanian singer, stroke.
- Shib Narayan Das, 77, Bangladeshi designer, first craftsman of the first national flag.
- Charles Parsons, 91, American philosopher.
- Motsoko Pheko, 93, South African lawyer, author and historian.
- Marcos Rivas, 76, Mexican footballer (Leones Negros Guadalajara, national team), complications from hernia repair.
- Ben Schrader, 59, New Zealand historian.
- Bill Tobin, 83, American football player (Houston Oilers) and executive (Chicago Bears).
- James Weiers, 70, American politician, member (1995–2013) and speaker (2001–2003, 2005–2009) of the Arizona House of Representatives.
- Tony Whyte, 84, Irish Gaelic football player (Clann na nGael, Roscommon GAA) and manager (Roscommon GAA).
- Sam Winningham, 97, American college football player (Colorado Buffaloes) and coach (Valley State).
- Zheng Jiagai, 61–62, Chinese paramilitary officer, chief of staff of the People's Armed Police Force (2017–2020).

=== 20 ===
- Jean-Marie Aerts, 72, Belgian guitarist (TC Matic).
- Charles Bateman, 93, American actor (Santa Barbara, Days of Our Lives, The Poseidon Adventure).
- G. T. Blankenship, 96, American lawyer and politician, Oklahoma attorney general (1967–1971), member of the Oklahoma House of Representatives (1961–1966).
- David Brading, 87, British historian.
- Temoteo Brito, 82, Brazilian politician, three-time mayor of Teixeira de Freitas, member of the Legislative Assembly of Bahia (1991–1992, 2011–2015).
- Antonio Cantafora, 80, Italian actor (Supersonic Man, Carambola!, Intervista), heart attack.
- Kaj Chydenius, 84, Finnish musician and composer.
- Michael Cuscuna, 75, American jazz record producer and music journalist (DownBeat), co-founder of Mosaic Records, Grammy winner (1993, 1998, 2002), complications from esophageal cancer.
- Sir Andrew Davis, 80, English conductor (BBC Symphony Orchestra, Lyric Opera of Chicago, Melbourne Symphony Orchestra), leukaemia.
- Greg Dean, 95, Australian footballer (St Kilda).
- Rudolf Földvári, 102, Hungarian politician and revolutionary, MP (1953–1957).
- Roman Gabriel, 83, American Hall of Fame football player (Los Angeles Rams, Philadelphia Eagles) and actor (The Undefeated).
- Pablo García Manzano, 91, Spanish judge and lawyer, magistrate of the Supreme Court (1978–1996) and Constitutional Court (1996–2004).
- Robert Kane, 85, American philosopher.
- Gediminas Kirkilas, 72, Lithuanian politician, prime minister (2006–2008), minister of national defence (2004–2006) and MP (1992–2020).
- Doreen Massey, Baroness Massey of Darwen, 85, British politician, member of the House of Lords (since 1999), cancer.
- Antoine Mboumbou Miyakou, 87, Gabonese politician.
- Cyra McFadden, 86, American author (The Serial).
- Mohammed Hanif Omar, 85, Malaysian police officer, inspector-general of police (1974–1994).
- Jan Ørke, 92, Norwegian footballer (Viking, national team).
- Yuri Ponosov, 83, Tajik politician, mayor of Dushanbe (1994–1996).
- Lourdes Portillo, 80, Mexican filmmaker (The Mothers of Plaza de Mayo, The Devil Never Sleeps, After the Earthquake).
- David Pryor, 89, American politician, governor of Arkansas (1975–1979), member of the U.S. House of Representatives (1966–1973) and Senate (1979–1997).
- Howie Schwab, 63, American television personality (Stump the Schwab), producer (ESPN), and writer (Fox Sports), heart attack.
- Pauli Siitonen, 86, Finnish Olympic cross-country skier (1968).
- Kunwar Sarvesh Kumar Singh, 71, Indian politician, MP (2014–2019) and Uttar Pradesh MLA (1991–2007, 2012–2014), heart attack.
- György Tatár, 71, Hungarian footballer (Diósgyőri VTK, national team).
- Tony Tuff, 69, Jamaican reggae singer (The African Brothers).
- Octavian Vintilă, 85, Romanian Olympic fencer (1964, 1972).

=== 21 ===
- Agassiz Almeida, 88, Brazilian politician.
- Terry A. Anderson, 76, American journalist (Associated Press), Hezbollah hostage (1985–1991), complications from heart surgery.
- Ángel Aranda, 89, Spanish actor (Planet of the Vampires, The Colossus of Rhodes, La bella di Lodi).
- Don Beck, 88, Australian politician, New South Wales MLA (1984–1999).
- Forrest Clingerman, 52, American academic and author.
- Étienne Delessert, 83, Swiss illustrator, cancer.
- Ana Estrada, 47, Peruvian psychologist and euthanasia activist, assisted suicide.
- Ray Garton, 61, American novelist, lung cancer.
- Luis Gil, 48, Spanish footballer (Logroñés, Real Murcia, Elche).
- Dame Joan Harbison, 86, Northern Irish public servant and activist.
- Alex Hassilev, 91, American musician (The Limeliters) and actor (The Russians Are Coming the Russians Are Coming), cancer.
- Ingrid Fuzjko Hemming, 92, Swedish classical pianist.
- Robin M. Hogarth, 81, British-American psychologist.
- James K. Hugessen, 90, Canadian jurist, justice of the Federal Court of Canada (1983–2008).
- Keith Kendall, 95, Australian cricketer (Victoria).
- Roedad Khan, 100, Pakistani civil servant and politician, secretary of industries and production (1958–1969), interior secretary (1978–1988), and minister of accountability (1990–1993).
- Marcel Kinsbourne, 92, Austrian-born American pediatric neurologist.
- KODA, 45, Ghanaian gospel singer.
- Haim Levin, 87, Israeli footballer (Maccabi Haifa, Maccabi Tel Aviv, national team).
- MC Duke, 58, British rapper.
- Ernst-Joachim Mestmäcker, 97, German lawyer.
- Renate Pickardt, 87, German endocrinologist.
- Chan Romero, 82, American singer-songwriter ("Hippy Hippy Shake") and guitarist.
- Jerome Rothenberg, 92, American poet (Technicians of the Sacred).
- Jerry Tennant, 86, American bobsledder.
- Pete Woolley, 94, Canadian football player (Hamilton Tiger-Cats).

=== 22 ===
- Hana Brejchová, 77, Czech actress (Loves of a Blonde, Amadeus, Cirkus Humberto). (death announced on this date)
- Yury Drobyshev, 68, Russian mathematician and academic administrator, rector of Kaluga State University (2004–2010).
- Durai, 84, Indian film director (Pasi, Oru Veedu Oru Ulagam).
- Tony Felloni, 81, Irish drug dealer, heart attack.
- Fedor Flašík, 66, Slovak political marketer, lymphoma.
- Charlie Hurley, 87, Irish football player (Sunderland, national team) and manager (Reading).
- Sudhir Kakar, 85, Indian psychoanalyst and writer.
- Philippe Laudenbach, 88, French actor (Muriel, My American Uncle, Confidentially Yours).
- Heamani Lavaka, 55, Tongan rugby union player (Eastern Suburbs, national team).
- Jeanine Moussier, 94, French Olympic sprinter (1948).
- Klaus Otto Nagorsnik, 68, German historian and quiz show contestant (Gefragt – Gejagt).
- Jay Robert Nash, 86, American author (The Motion Picture Guide), lung cancer.
- Katherine Porter, 82, American visual artist.
- Waliul Haq Rumi, 59, Bangladeshi actor, colon cancer.
- Govind Ram Sharma, 95, Indian politician, Jammu and Kashmir MLA (1987–2022).
- Al Shaver, 96, Canadian Hall of Fame sportscaster (Minnesota North Stars, Minnesota Golden Gophers).
- Jason Sutton, 56, British drag queen.
- Brian Tobin, 93, Australian Hall of Fame tennis player and executive, president of the International Tennis Federation (1991–1999).
- Michael Verhoeven, 85, German film director (Die Weiße Rose, o.k., The Nasty Girl), screenwriter and producer.
- Arthur Whittington, 68, American football player (Oakland Raiders, Buffalo Bills).
- Cecil Williams, 94, American pastor (Glide Memorial Church) and LGBT activist.
- Xiang Chongyang, 96, Chinese agriculturalist.
- Abdul Majeed al-Zindani, 82, Yemeni Islamic cleric, founder of the Iman University.

=== 23 ===
- Zulu Adigwe, Nigerian actor (Basi and Company, Issakaba, Living in Bondage: Breaking Free).
- Syed Rafat Alam, 73, Indian judge, chief justice of the Madhya Pradesh High Court (2009–2011).
- An Qiyuan, 90, Chinese politician.
- George Baker, 88, Welsh footballer (Plymouth Argyle, national team).
- Philip Barter, 84, American painter.
- Margaret Bell, 79, British Olympic gymnast.
- Nora Vagi Brash, 79, Papua New Guinean playwright.
- Terry Carter, 95, American actor (Foxy Brown, McCloud, Battlestar Galactica).
- Ed Chadwick, 90, Canadian ice hockey player (Toronto Maple Leafs, Boston Bruins).
- Ray Chan, 56, British art director (Avengers: Infinity War, Children of Men) and production designer (Dungeons & Dragons: Honor Among Thieves), stroke.
- Florian Chmielewski, 97, American musician and politician, member (1971–1997) and president (1987) of the Minnesota Senate.
- Robert H. Dennard, 91, American electrical engineer and inventor.
- Delaine Eastin, 76, American politician, California state superintendent of public instruction (1995–2003), member of the California State Assembly (1986–1994).
- Frank Field, Baron Field of Birkenhead, 81, British politician, MP (1979–2019) and member of the House of Lords (since 2020), prostate cancer.
- Sylvia Gyde, 88, British public health doctor and medical researcher.
- Dan Harnedy, 82, Irish hurler (Castlemagner, Carlow Town Hurling Club) and Gaelic footballer (UCC).
- Jürgen Herzog, 82, German mathematician, heart attack.
- Melissa Inouye, 44, American historian, colon cancer.
- Andrzej Jarosik, 79, Polish footballer (Zagłębie Sosnowiec, RC Strasbourg Alsace, national team).
- Sue Johnson, 76, British clinical psychologist, couples therapist and author, cancer.
- Geoffrey Kapusa, 52, Malawian television and radio broadcaster.
- Elena Karpushenko, 62, Russian rhythmic gymnastics coach.
- Yukio Kasaya, 80, Japanese ski jumper, Olympic champion (1972).
- Samuel Kummer, 56, German organist (Frauenkirche, Dresden) and academic.
- Fergie MacDonald, 86, Scottish accordionist.
- Greg Mahlberg, 71, American baseball player (Texas Rangers).
- Murunwa Makwarela, 51, South African politician, mayor of Tshwane (2023).
- David Marquand, 89, British politician and academic administrator, MP (1966–1977) and principal of Mansfield College, Oxford (1996–2002).
- Mayte Méndez, 62, Spanish basketball coach, vascular issues.
- James W. Moorman, 86, American lawyer, assistant attorney general for the environment and natural resources (1977–1981).
- José Luis Muñoz Soria, 75, Mexican politician, member of the Congress of Mexico City (2009–2012) and deputy (2012–2015).
- Florin Oprea, 76, Romanian footballer (Universitatea Craiova).
- Mai Raud-Pähn, 103, Estonian-Swedish art historian, editor and journalist.
- Ro Jai-bong, 88, South Korean politician, prime minister (1990–1991), blood cancer.
- Francisco Rodríguez, 78, Venezuelan boxer, Olympic champion (1968).
- Allan Rushmer, 80, British Olympic long-distance runner (1968).
- Rene Saguisag, 84, Filipino politician, senator (1987–1992).
- Mary V. Seeman, 89, Canadian psychiatrist.
- Charlie Siler, 94, American politician, member of the Kentucky House of Representatives (1985–1991, 1995–2011).
- Olga Slivková, 87, Slovak journalist and translator.
- Tom Tischinski, 79, American baseball player (Minnesota Twins).
- Helen Vendler, 90, American literary critic.

=== 24 ===
- Ron Cerrudo, 79, American golfer.
- Bob Cole, 90, Canadian Hall of Fame sportscaster (Hockey Night in Canada).
- William Edward Crews, 91, American politician.
- Roy Cross, 100, British artist and aviation journalist.
- Rajvir Singh Diler, 65, Indian politician, MP (since 2019) and Uttar Pradesh MLA (2017–2019), heart attack.
- Nancy Dorian, 87, American linguist.
- Adele Faber, 96, American author.
- Evelia Farina, 82, Argentine Olympic sprinter.
- Abdul Aleem Farooqui, 76, Indian Islamic scholar.
- Oľga Glosíková, 71, Slovak politician, MP (1991–1992).
- Mehmet Güney, 87, Turkish jurist and diplomat.
- Erwin Hari, 90, Swiss Olympic cross-country skier (1956).
- Terry Hill, 52, Australian rugby league player (Manly Warringah, New South Wales, national team), heart attack.
- Roger Hugo, 81, English footballer (West Ham United, Watford). (death announced on this date)
- Bryan Lane, 87, Australian rules footballer (Fitzroy).
- Margaret Lee, 80, English actress (I due pericoli pubblici, Letti sbagliati, The Killers Are Our Guests).
- Friedrich Leisch, 55, Austrian statistician.
- Rudolf Mitteregger, 79, Austrian Olympic road racing cyclist (1972, 1976).
- Satomi Oka, 88, Japanese actress (Dai-bosatsu tōge, Akō Rōshi, Bushido, Samurai Saga).
- John O'Shea, 83, Welsh rugby union player (Cardiff RFC, British & Irish Lions, national team), pneumonia.
- Donald Payne Jr., 65, American politician, member of the U.S. House of Representatives (since 2012), heart attack.
- Donald Petersen, 97, American businessman, CEO of the Ford Motor Company (1985–1990).
- Nick Phipps, 72, British Olympic bobsledder (1980, 1992).
- Mike Pinder, 82, English Hall of Fame musician (The Moody Blues) and songwriter ("The Best Way to Travel", "A Simple Game").
- Jerome J. Pollitt, 89, American art historian.
- Wolfgang Schüler, 66, German footballer (Borussia Dortmund, Stuttgarter Kickers, 1. FC Saarbrücken).
- Mooryati Soedibyo, 96, Indonesian politician and royal, deputy speaker of the People's Consultative Assembly (2004–2009) and founder of Puteri Indonesia.
- Hans Tuppy, 99, Austrian biochemist and politician, minister for science and research (1987–1989).

=== 25 ===
- Marla Adams, 85, American actress (The Young and the Restless, The Secret Storm, Splendor in the Grass), Emmy winner (2021).
- Ferenc András, 81, Hungarian film director (The Vulture, Rain and Shine) and screenwriter.
- Joe Antonacci, 63, American boxing commentator.
- Bob Appleby, 84, English footballer (Middlesbrough).
- Au Ho-nien, 89, Chinese painter.
- Earl M. Baker, 84, American politician, member of the Pennsylvania State Senate (1989–1995).
- Laurent Cantet, 63, French film director (The Class, Human Resources, Time Out), screenwriter, and cinematographer.
- Korey Cunningham, 28, American football player (Arizona Cardinals, New England Patriots, New York Giants).
- Marek Czakon, 60, Polish footballer (Ilves, Eintracht Trier).
- Ayogu Eze, 65, Nigerian politician, senator (2007–2015).
- Thomas Kessler, 86, Swiss electronic music composer. (death announced on this date)
- Kaisa Korhonen, 82, Finnish theatre director, actress, and singer.
- Robert Lichal, 91, Austrian politician, member of the National Council (1979–1987) and minister of defence (1987–1990).
- Constantin Lissenko, 90, French Olympic sprinter (1956).
- John Mildren, 91, Australian politician, MP (1980–1990).
- Doug Oldford, 75, Canadian politician, MHA (1991–2000).
- George Seligman, 96, American mathematician.
- Dennis Sindrey, 88, Australian musician.
- Elmira Süleymanova, 86, Azerbaijani chemist and civil servant.
- Ross Thornton, 67, Australian footballer (Fitzroy), cancer.
- Kenji Tohira, 83, Japanese racing driver.

=== 26 ===
- Lyle Bauer, 65, Canadian football player and executive (Winnipeg Blue Bombers), infection.
- Sergio de Castro, 94, Chilean economist (El Ladrillo) and politician, minister of economy (1975–1976) and finance (1976–1982).
- Alfrēds Čepānis, 80, Latvian politician, speaker of the Saeima (1996–1998).
- Umm Fahad, 27, Iraqi social media personality, shot.
- Freda Freiberg, 90, Australian academic.
- Robin George, 68, British guitarist, singer and producer.
- Orachunnoi Hor.Mahachai, 73, Thai Muay Thai fighter, light flyweight champion (1974, 1976–1978).
- Peter Ingham, 83, Australian Roman Catholic prelate, auxiliary bishop of Sydney (1993–2001) and bishop of Wollongong (2001–2017).
- Yumi Katsura, 94, Japanese fashion designer.
- Renna Kellaway, 92, British pianist and music teacher, founder of the Lake District Summer Music festival.
- A. P. Komala, 89, Indian singer.
- Wim Kozijn, 83, Dutch politician, mayor of 's-Graveland (1987–2002).
- Joe Lartey, 96, Ghanaian sports commentator (GBC, FRCN).
- Donald Laub, 89, American plastic surgeon, founder of Interplast.
- Volker Mosblech, 69, German politician, MP (2015–2017) and member of the Landtag of North Rhine-Westphalia (2004–2005).
- Dave O'Sullivan, 90, New Zealand Hall of Fame Thoroughbred racehorse trainer and jockey.
- Francisco Rico Manrique, 81, Spanish philologist, member of the Royal Spanish Academy.
- José Santa Cruz, 95, Brazilian comedian (A Praça é Nossa, Zorra Total) and voice actor.
- Takeshi Shirai, 47, Japanese Olympic equestrian (1996, 2000).
- Joe Sims, 55, American football player (Atlanta Falcons, Green Bay Packers, Philadelphia Eagles).
- Aaron Thomas, 86, American football player (San Francisco 49ers, New York Giants).
- Marina Vishmidt, 47, American writer.
- Frank Wakefield, 89, American mandolin player.
- Graham Webb, 88, Australian radio and TV broadcaster (Blind Date).

=== 27 ===
- Elpidio Barzaga Jr., 74, Filipino politician, member of the House of Representatives (2007–2016, since 2019) and three-time mayor of Dasmariñas.
- Roy Boyd, 85, English actor (The Wicker Man, Crossroads, Emmerdale).
- David Chackler, 79, American music and film executive.
- Chang Yinfo, 92, Chinese mineral deposit geologist, member of the Chinese Academy of Sciences and the Chinese Academy of Engineering.
- J. Gary Cooper, 87, American politician and diplomat, member of the Alabama House of Representatives (1974–1978), assistant secretary of the Air Force (MR) (1989–1992), ambassador to Jamaica (1994–1997).
- Giulietta Della Balda, 86, Sammarinese politician and civil servant, mayor of City of San Marino (1994–2004).
- Gul Hammad Farooqi, Pakistani journalist, heart attack.
- Jean-Pierre Ferland, 89, Canadian singer-songwriter.
- Boudewijn de Geer, 68, Dutch football player (HFC Haarlem, Molde) and manager (HBS Craeyenhout).
- Philip Hefner, 91, American theologian.
- James E. Henshaw, 92, American politician, member of the Oklahoma House of Representatives (1981–1995).
- Wendy James, 84, British social anthropologist and academic.
- Valentyn Korenchuk, 47, Ukrainian fighter pilot.
- Louiselle, 77, Italian singer.
- Patsy Lovell, 69, English cricketer (Surrey, national team).
- Joseph H. McGee Jr., 95, American politician, member of the South Carolina House of Representatives (1963–1968).
- Katherin Kovin Pacino, 71–72, American actress and child advocate.
- Joko Pinurbo, 61, Indonesian poet.
- C. J. Sansom, 71, British author (Shardlake), multiple myeloma.
- Frederick N. Six, 95, American jurist, justice of the Kansas Supreme Court (1988–2003).
- Carol Weihrer, 72, American health activist.

=== 28 ===
- Ivan Argüelles, 85, American poet.
- Pranab Kumar Barua, 89, Bangladeshi literary scholar.
- Heinz Binder, 81, Austrian football player (Austria Wien, FC Wacker Innsbruck, national team) and coach.
- William Calley, 80, American war criminal (My Lai massacre).
- Norman Carol, 95, American violinist and concertmaster (Philadelphia Orchestra).
- Joel Conarroe, 89, American arts administrator.
- M. K. Eelaventhan, 91, Sri Lankan Tamil politician, MP (2004–2007).
- Abdul Qadir Fitrat, Afghan banker, governor of Da Afghanistan Bank (2007–2011), cancer.
- Stephen Grimason, 67, Northern Irish journalist and editor (BBC Northern Ireland).
- Michael Hanna, 97, English cricketer (Somerset) and rugby union player (Bath).
- Lawrence Haworth, 97, American-born Canadian philosopher.
- Monty Jones, 73, Sierra Leonean plant breeder.
- Walter Kolbow, 80, German politician, MP (1980–2009).
- Jerry Labriola, 92, American politician, member of the Connecticut State Senate (1981–1983).
- Jerome Mayer, 93, American politician, member of the South Dakota Senate (1973–1976, 1977–1980).
- Brian McCardie, 59, Scottish actor (Rob Roy, The Ghost and the Darkness, Speed 2: Cruise Control) and writer.
- Georgy Mondzolevski, 90, Russian volleyball player, Olympic champion (1964, 1968).
- Gilberto Noletti, 82, Italian footballer (Milan, Lazio, Juventus).
- Zack Norman, 83, American comedian, film producer (Tracks), and actor (Romancing the Stone, Cadillac Man), complications from COVID-19.
- Sir Vincent O'Sullivan, 86, New Zealand writer, Poet Laureate (2013–2015).
- Landy Párraga, 23, Ecuadorian model and influencer, shot.
- Michael J. Roads, 87, English-born Australian author.
- Larissa Salmina-Haskell, 92–93, Russian art historian and curator.
- Alan Scarfe, 77, British-Canadian actor (The Bay Boy, Deserters, Lethal Weapon 3) and theatre director, colon cancer.
- Shishkin, 10, Irish-bred British Thoroughbred racehorse, winner of the Arkle Challenge Trophy (2021), Clarence House Chase (2022), and Aintree Bowl (2023).
- Joe Thomas, 68, American music producer, businessman and songwriter.
- Petro Tolochko, 86, Ukrainian historian, archaeologist and political activist, MP (1998–2006).
- Andrei Tropillo, 73, Russian record producer and sound engineer, founder of AnTrop.
- Bob Tyler, 91, American college football coach (Mississippi State Bulldogs, North Texas Mean Green, Millsaps Majors) and administrator.
- Andris Vilks, 60, Latvian politician, minister of finance (2010–2014).
- Wan Huilin, 85, Chinese physical chemist.
- Daniel E. Winstead, 78, American politician, member of the South Carolina House of Representatives (1979–1990).

=== 29 ===
- Haman Adama, 73–74, Cameroonian politician.
- Laurie Adams, 93, English footballer (Watford).
- Pieter Baas, 80, Dutch botanist.
- André Bar, 88, Belgian Olympic cyclist.
- Wally Dallenbach Sr., 87, American Hall of Fame racing driver (CART).
- Peter Demetz, 101, Czechoslovak-born American Germanist and author.
- Mykhaylo Fomenko, 75, Ukrainian football player (Dynamo Kyiv, Soviet Union national team) and manager (national team), Olympic bronze medallist (1976).
- Hans Geissel, 73, German experimental physicist.
- Jean-Pierre Giudicelli, 81, French pentathlete, Olympic bronze medallist (1968).
- Dagne Groven Myhren, 83, Norwegian literary scholar and folk musician.
- Nancy E. Gwinn, 78, American librarian.
- Jan Haag, 90, American filmmaker, artist and writer.
- Lesley Hazleton, 78, British-American author and journalist, assisted suicide.
- Daniel Kramer, 91, American photographer (Bob Dylan).
- Mollie Lentaigne, 103, British artist and Voluntary Aid Detachment nurse during World War II.
- Luis Mendoza, 78, Venezuelan football player (national team) and manager (Mineros de Guayana).
- Charlotte F. Muller, 103, American economist and academic.
- Srinivasa Prasad, 76, Indian politician, MP (1980–1996, 1999–2004, since 2019).
- Charles Pryor, 64, American politician, member of the Missouri House of Representatives (1993–2001).
- Red Giant, 20, American Thoroughbred racehorse. (death announced on this date)
- Billy Reil, 44, American professional wrestler (JAPW).
- Sérgio Ribeiro, 88, Portuguese politician, MEP (2004–2005).
- Andrew Stunell, Baron Stunell, 81, British politician, MP (1997–2015) and member of the House of Lords (since 2015).
- Fernando Suárez González, 90, Spanish politician and jurist, MP (1982–1986), MEP (1986–1994), and third deputy prime minister (1975).
- Dingaan Thobela, 57, South African boxer, WBO (1990–1991), WBA (1993) lightweight and WBC super middleweight champion (2000).
- Ben Weese, 94, American architect (Chicago Seven), complications from Alzheimer's disease.
- Gerhard Weisenberger, 72, German Olympic wrestler (1972, 1976).

=== 30 ===
- Paul Auster, 77, American author (The New York Trilogy, Moon Palace, The Music of Chance), lung cancer.
- Jerome H. Barkow, 80, American-born Canadian anthropologist.
- Richard J. Carling, 87, American politician, member of the Utah House of Representatives (1966–1973) and Senate (1973, 1975–1990).
- Renato De Fusco, 94, Italian architectural historian.
- Duane Eddy, 86, American Hall of Fame guitarist ("Rebel-'Rouser", "Because They're Young", "Peter Gunn"), cancer.
- Halvdan Furholt, 93, Norwegian educator and folk musician.
- Jon Haward, 58, British comic book artist (Teenage Mutant Ninja Turtles, Judge Dredd, Biker Mice from Mars).
- Ngapare Hopa, 88, New Zealand Māori academic.
- Adrian Horridge, 96, British-born Australian microbiologist.
- Norma Howard, 65, American Choctaw artist.
- Sir Robert Martin, 66–67, New Zealand disability rights activist, member of the UN Committee on the Rights of Persons with Disabilities (since 2017).
- Francisco Manuel Moreno, 73, Mexican Anglican bishop.
- MC Conrad, 52, British musician.
- Herb Pardes, 89, American physician.
- Pino Pinelli, 85, Italian painter.
- Lyndall Ryan, 81, Australian historian, cancer.
- Andrea Shundi, 89, Albanian-American agronomist, pancreatic cancer.
- Stefano Stefani, 85, Italian politician, MP (1994–2013).
- Mely G. Tan, 93, Indonesian sociologist.
- Uyunqimg, 81, Chinese politician, vice chair of the Standing Committee of the National People's Congress (2003–2013) and chair of Inner Mongolia (2000–2003).
- Alice Holloway Young, 100, American educator.
- Fabrizio Zardini, 57, Italian alpine skier, Paralympic champion (2002).
