= Lawrence Adams =

Lawrence, Laurence or Larry Adams may refer to:

- Lawrence Adams (English politician) (died by 1645)
- Lawrence Adams (artist), awarded Logan Medal of the Arts
- Laurie Adams (Laurence Adams, 1931–2024), English footballer
- Larry Adams (jockey) (1936–2000), American jockey
- Larry Adams (politician), Ohio politician
- Lawrence Adams (Mississippi politician) (1914–1994)
- Lawrence Adams (dancer) (1936–2003), Canadian dancer, archivist and publisher
