= Through the Eyes of Love (disambiguation) =

"Through the Eyes of Love" is a song performed by American singer Melissa Manchester, from the soundtrack of the 1978 film Ice Castles.

Through the Eyes of Love may also refer to:

- Through the Eyes of Love (Ray Charles album), 1972
- Through the Eyes of Love (Randy Crawford album), 1992
- Through the Eyes of Love, an album by The Frost, 1970
- "Through the Eyes of Love", a 1967 single and title track of 1968 album by Tompall & the Glaser Brothers
- Through the Eyes of Love, a three-volume 2013 book by Michael J. Roads

== See also ==
- "Looking Through the Eyes of Love", a song by Barry Mann and Cynthia Weil, with popular versions recorded in 1965 by Gene Pitney and in 1972 by The Partridge Family
- I Must Be Seeing Things, a 1965 album by Gene Pitney, titled Looking Thru the Eyes of Love in the UK
