= Pacino (name) =

Pacino is a given name and a surname. Notable people with the name include:

== Given name ==
- Pacino di Buonaguida (active c.1303 – c.1347), Italian painter
- Pacino Horne (born 1983), American football player

== Surname ==
- Al Pacino (born 1940), American actor
- Evelyn Sanguinetti (née Pacino; born 1970), American politician, lawyer and lieutenant governor of Illinois (2015–2019)
- Julie Pacino (born 1989), American filmmaker, daughter of Al Pacino
- Katherin Kovin Pacino (1952–2024), American actress and child advocate
