= Mario Menéndez Rodríguez =

Mexican journalist (1937–2024)

Mario Renato Menéndez Rodríguez (14 January 1937 – 15 April 2024) was a Mexican journalist who was the director-general of Por Esto!, one of the largest daily newspapers in Mérida, Yucatán. He was the first Mexican to interview Fidel Castro after the Cuban revolution. Menéndez Rodríguez was born on 14 January 1937, and died on 15 April 2024, at the age of 87.
