= Pablo García Manzano =

Spanish judge (1932–2024)

Pablo García Manzano (15 May 1932 – 20 April 2024) was a Spanish judge and lawyer. He served as a justice of the Supreme Court of Spain, the country's highest court, from 1978 until 1996 and the Constitutional Court of Spain from 1996 until 2004.

== Biography ==
After graduating with a degree in law from the Complutense University of Madrid (1954), he sat the competitive examination to become a judge in the contentious-administrative jurisdiction (1962).

Married to Pastora Jiménez de Andrade Fernández de Córdoba, they were the parents of Pastora and Pablo García Jiménez de Andrade.

García died on 20 April 2024, at the age of 91.
