= Harry Paynter =

Australian rules footballer

Personal information
- Full name: Henry Charles Paynter
- Born: 17 September 1927
- Died: 9 April 2024 (aged 96)
- Original team: Fairfield
- Height: 185 cm (6 ft 1 in)
- Weight: 87 kg (192 lb)

Playing career^{1}
Years	Club	Games (Goals)
1950	Collingwood	1 (0)
- ^{1} Playing statistics correct to the end of 1950.

Henry Charles "Harry" Paynter (17 September 1927 – 9 April 2024) was an Australian rules footballer who played for Collingwood in the Victorian Football League (VFL).
