= Greg Dean (footballer) =

Australian rules footballer (1928–2024)

Personal information
- Full name: Gregory Winspear Dean
- Born: 14 October 1928
- Died: 20 April 2024 (aged 95)
- Height: 182 cm (6 ft 0 in)
- Weight: 78 kg (172 lb)

Playing career^{1}
Years	Club	Games (Goals)
1949–50	St Kilda	7 (1)
- ^{1} Playing statistics correct to the end of 1950.

Gregory Winspear Dean (14 October 1928 – 20 April 2024) was an Australian rules footballer who played with St Kilda in the Victorian Football League (VFL). He died on 20 April 2024, at the age of 95.
