= Waliul Haq Rumi =

Bangladeshi actor (1963/1964 – 2024)

- অলিউল হক রুমি
- Born: Waliul Haq Rumi; 1964; Barguna, East Pakistan, Pakistan
- Died: 22 April 2024 (aged 59); Dhaka, Bangladesh
- Occupation: Actor
- Years active: 1988–2024

Waliul Haq Rumi (Bengali: অলিউল হক রুমি; 24 October 1964 – 22 April 2024) was a Bangladeshi stage and television actor. He worked in the acting world for more than three decades. He also acted in several films.

== Career ==
Rumi started his acting career in 1988 with the play 'Ekhno Kreetodas'. In the same year, he made his debut on the small screen with the drama 'Kon Kananer Phool'. He made his debut on the big screen by acting in the 2009 Doriaparer Douloti movie. Some of his notable plays are— Suggestion Salim (সাজেশন সেলিম), Bokasoka Tinjon (বোকাসোকা তিনজন), Make Up Man (মেকাপ ম্যান), Dhaka to Barisal (ঢাকা টু বরিশাল), Dhaka Metro Love (ঢাকা মেট্রো লাভ), Baap Beta Dourer Upor (বাপ বেটা দৌড়ের উপর), American Saheb (আমেরিকান সাহেব), Journey By Bus (জার্নি বাই বাস), Bakir Naam Faaki (বাকির নাম ফাঁকি), Ratane Ratan Chinne (রতনে রতন চিনে), Choitah Pagal (চৈতা পাগল), Jiboner Oligoly (জীবনের অলিগলি), Jamaj (Serial) (যমজ (ধারাবাহিক)) and Meghe Dhaka Shohor (মেঘে ঢাকা শহর).

Apart from acting, he also worked for a national newspaper of Bangladesh, The Daily Ittefaq.

== Personal life and death ==
Waliul Haque Rumi was born to independence activist Azizul Haque and Hamida Haque. He was the third child among three brothers and three sisters.

Rumi died of pancreatic cancer on 22 April 2024, whilst undergoing treatment at a private hospital in Dhaka. He was 59.
