= Nilo Dzib =

Mexican sailor (born 1956)

Personal information
- Nationality: Mexico
- Born: 26 October 1956 Chichimila, Yucatan, Mexico
- Died: 17 April 2024 (aged 67) Cozumel, Quintana Roo, Mexico
- Height: 1.56 m (5 ft 1 in)
- Weight: 60 kg (130 lb)

Sport
- Sport: Windsurfing

Nilo Dzib (26 September 1956 – 17 April 2024) was a Mexican windsurfer. He competed in the 1988 Summer Olympics.
