= Mai Raud-Pähn =

Estonian-Swedish art historian, editor, and journalist (1920–2024)

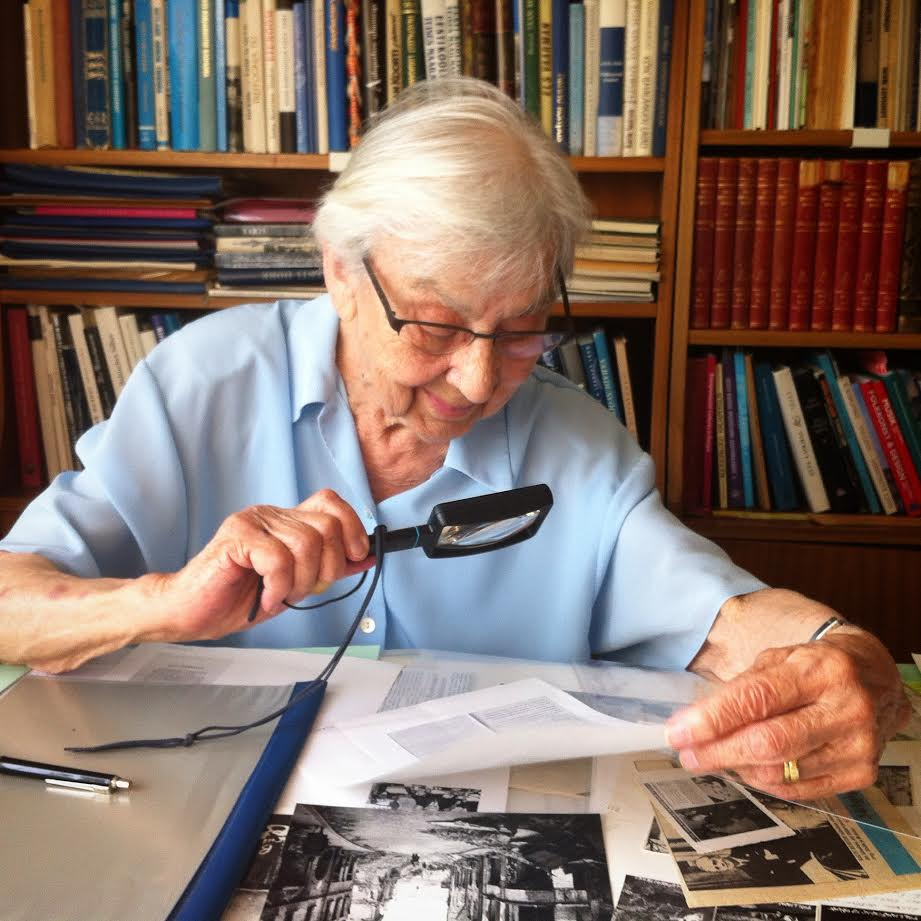
Raud-Pähn in 2014

Mai Hinge Raud-Pähn (2 November 1920 – 23 April 2024) was an Estonian-Swedish art historian, editor, and journalist. She was the editor-in-chief of the Swedish-Estonian magazine Rahvuslik Kontakt from 1987 to 2014. Raud-Pähn was honoured with the Order of the White Star from the President of Estonia for her significant contributions to history and art.

== Life and career ==
Mai Hinge Raud-Pähn was born on 2 November 1920 in Pärnu, Estonia. Her father, Märt Raud (1881–1980), was a writer and school counselor, and her mother, Anna Raud, was one of the first female teachers in Estonia. In 1928, she attended the Viljandi Eesti Haridusseltsi Tütarlaste Gümnaasiumi Algkoolis school, and from 1934 to 1937, she was a student of the Pärnu Flickgymnasium. After graduating from the Stockholm School of Applied Arts, she worked as a teacher in Stockholm and Visby. In 1940, the family was forced to move to Germany due to World War II. They subsequently returned to Sweden via Denmark. From 1957 to 1964, Raud-Pähn was a student of art history Stockholm University, where she was taught by historian Sten Karling. She also undertook archeology and ethnography courses. In 1972, she earned a licentiate degree from the university, with the thesis on a silversmith in Tallinn during the period 1474–1659.

From 1987 to 2014, Raud-Pähn was the editor-in-chief of the Swedish-Estonian magazine Rahvuslik Kontakt. For several years, she was member of the Swedish Association of Estonians (Swedish Association of Estonians – REL) and the Estonian National Museum's Friends' Association. She has contributed to several articles on art history, as well as language courses.

Raud-Pähn turned 100 in 2020, and died on 23 April 2024, at the age of 103.

== Awards and honours ==
Raud-Pähn was awarded the Order of the White Star, Medal Class from the President of Estonia in 2001, and the Swedish National Association of Culture award in 2006, in recognition of her significant contributions to history and art.
