= Gul Hammad Farooqi =

Pakistani journalist (died 2024)

- گل حماد فاروقی
- Died: 27 April 2024; Chitral, Khyber Pakhtunkhwa, Pakistan
- Occupation: Journalist
- Known for: Exposing social and public issues in Chitral
- Children: 4

Gul Hammad Farooqi (Urdu: گل حماد فاروقی; died 27 April 2024) was a Pakistani journalist based in Chitral. He was associated with various news channels and newspapers. He was known for his commitment to freedom of the press.

== Early life and career ==
Farooqi had worked in the Meteorological Department before taking early retirement. After retirement, he moved to Chitral where he started his career in journalism. He was known for his dedication to highlighting social and public issues through the media. He often travelled to remote areas to cover stories.

Farooqi rendered significant services in journalism in Chitral. He exposed poor road construction in Chitral, which led a construction company's staff to assault him. Despite the challenges, he worked tirelessly to bring attention to various issues in the region.

== Personal life and death ==
After marriage, Farooqi settled in Chitral and built a house in Sangur village. He is survived by two sons and two daughters from his second wife.

Farooqi died from a heart attack at the District Headquarters Hospital in Chitral, on 27 April 2024. Many people including Khyber Pakhtunkhwa Chief Minister Ali Amin Gandapur and Information Adviser Muhammad Ali Saif expressed their grief over his death. His body was taken to his native village Shabkadar in Charsadda for burial as per the wishes of his brothers.
