= Michael Hanna (sportsman) =

English cricketer and rugby union footballer (1926–2024)

Personal information
- Full name: Michael Hanna
- Born: 6 June 1926; Camberwell, London, England
- Died: 28 April 2024 (aged 97)
- Batting: Right-handed
- Role: Wicket-keeper

Domestic team information
- Years: Team
- 1951–1954: Somerset
- FC debut: 19 May 1951 Somerset v Nottinghamshire
- Last FC: 25 June 1954 Somerset v Northamptonshire
- LA debut: 2 May 1964 Wiltshire v Hampshire
- Last LA: 1 May 1965 Wiltshire v Nottinghamshire

Career statistics
Competition	First-class	List A
Matches	2	2
Runs scored	5	5
Batting average	2.50	2.50
100s/50s	0/0	0/0
Top score	4*	4
Catches/stumpings	0/0	0/0
- Source: CricketArchive, 15 February 2010

Michael Hanna (6 June 1926 – 28 April 2024) was an English first-class cricketer for Somerset and List A and Minor Counties cricketer for Wiltshire. He also played rugby union for Bath and for Somerset.

As a cricketer, Hanna was a right-handed lower-order batsman and a wicketkeeper whose opportunities to play county cricket in the 1950s were limited by the presence of Harold Stephenson in the Somerset side. Hanna played one match against Nottinghamshire at Yeovil in 1951: in a rain-affected match, Nottinghamshire made 401 for seven wickets, and Hanna did not take a catch or, when Somerset batted, score a run. His only other first-class match, three years later against Northamptonshire, was no more successful. Northamptonshire made 362 for two wickets and though Somerset avoided being beaten by an innings, the match was lost by 10 wickets. Again Hanna did not take a catch, though this time he made 4 not out in the first innings and a single in the second.

From 1957 to 1968, Hanna played Minor Counties cricket for Wiltshire, and in 1964 and 1965 he played in Gillette Cup matches for the team against first-class county sides. He scored four runs against Hampshire in 1964 and one run against Nottinghamshire in 1965, but in neither match did he take any catches or effect any stumpings.

As a rugby player, he was scrum-half for both Bath and Somerset.

In 1970, he was appointed deputy county welfare officer for Derbyshire County Council.

Hanna died on 28 April 2024, at the age of 97.
