= Temoteo Brito =

Brazilian politician (1941–2024)

Temoteo Alves de Brito
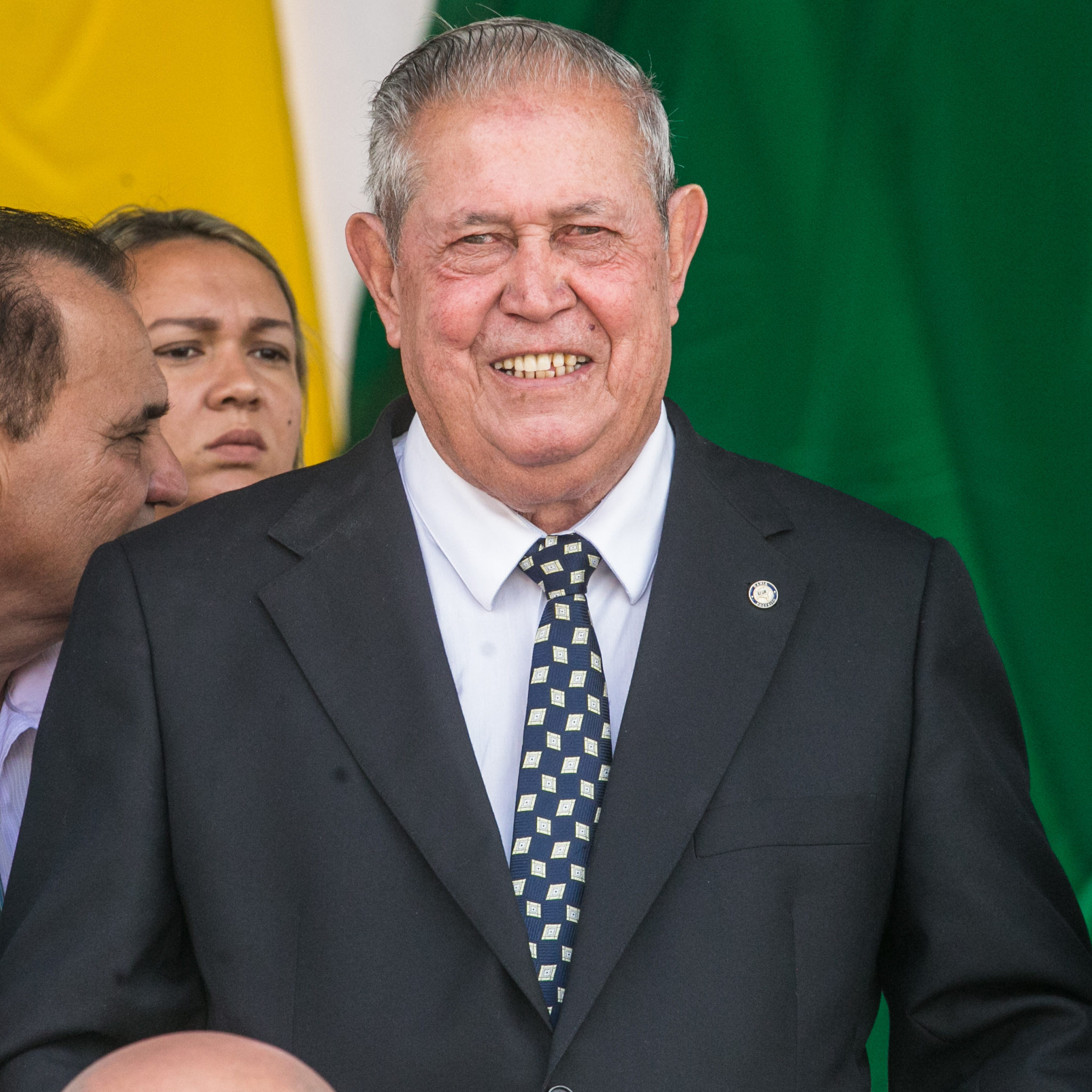

9th Mayor of Teixeira de Freitas
- In office 1 January 2017 – 31 December 2020
- Preceded by: João Bosco Bittencourt
- Succeeded by: Marcelo Gusmão Pontes Belitardo

Member of the Legislative Assembly of Bahia
- In office 2011–2015

3rd Mayor of Teixeira de Freitas
- In office 1 January 1993 – 31 December 1996
- Preceded by: Francistônio Alves Pinto
- Succeeded by: Wagner Ramos Mendonça

Member of the Legislative Assembly of Bahia
- In office 1991 – December 1992

1st Mayor of Teixeira de Freitas
- In office 1 January 1986 – 31 December 1988
- Preceded by: Office created
- Succeeded by: Francistônio Alves Pinto

Personal details
- Born: Temoteo Alves de Brito; 9 November 1941 Itapetinga, Bahia, Brazil
- Died: 20 April 2024 (aged 82) Belo Horizonte, Minas Gerais, Brazil

Temoteo Alves de Brito (9 November 1941 – 20 April 2024), commonly known as Temoteo Brito, was a Brazilian politician and farmer. He served as the first Mayor of Teixeira de Freitas, Bahia, from the city's incorporation in 1986 until 1988. He was later elected Mayor of Teixeira de Freitas from 1993 to 1996 and again from 2017 until 2020. Brito also served two tenures in the Legislative Assembly of Bahia: from 1991 to 1995 as a member of the National Reconstruction Party (PRN) and again from 2011 until 2015 as a member of the Brazilian Democratic Movement (MBD).

Brito died from complications of leukemia and pneumonia at a hospital in Belo Horizonte, on 20 April 2024, at the age of 82. He was laid in state at the Jacarandá Country Club.
