= Russell Newcombe =

British substance use researcher (1957–2024)

- Born: 1957; Shrewsbury, Shropshire, England
- Died: 4 April 2024 (aged 66)
- Occupation(s): Researcher, harm reduction advocate

Russell D. Newcombe (1957 – 4 April 2024) was a British substance use researcher. His 1987 article "High Time for Harm Reduction" in Druglink, the magazine of the Institute for the Study of Drug Dependence, helped popularize the concept of harm reduction.

== Early life and education ==
Russell D. Newcombe was born in Shrewsbury, England in 1957, to Bill and Vera (née Davies) Newcombe. In 1979, Newcombe graduated from the University of Sussex, where he studied social psychology. He earned a doctorate in social psychology from the University of Kent in 1983.

== Career ==
=== 1983–2010: Academic and nonprofit career ===
Newcombe began his career as a research assistant at the Chelsea College of Science and Technology, where he worked on a project concerning secondary school policies towards smoking. From 1985 to 1987, he served as a research associate on the Wirral Misuse of Drugs Research Project team at the University of Liverpool, where he explored the crisis of injected drugs, which was amplified by the AIDS pandemic. In 1987, he published his article "High Time for Harm Reduction" in Druglink, which popularized the concept of harm reduction. Newcombe next took research positions at the South Sefton District Health Authority and the Mersey Region Health Authority. Between 1991 and 1993, he managed the Alcohol, Drugs & Crime Research Project at The University of Manchester.

In 1998, Newcombe joined the Liverpool John Moores University faculty as an associate professor. He left the university in 2005 for a position at Manchester Lifeline.

In March 2024, the United Nations Commission on Narcotic Drugs passed a resolution accepting Newcombe's term "harm reduction.

=== 2010–2024: 3D Research and independent endeavors ===
Newcombe founded the 3D Research Bureau in the late 1980s, with a focus on harm reduction among MDMA users in Liverpool's rave scene. In 2010, Newcombe relaunched the agency as 3D Research to pursue freelance research and advocacy. In his consulting, he worked with film and television agencies to appropriately portray drug use. This including working with Benedict Cumberbatch for his role in the 2018 mini-series Patrick Melrose.

== Personal life ==
Newcombe married and divorced Jane (née Gregory), with whom he had two children. In 2012, he married his second wife, Cher (née White), a Canadian drugs expert.

In March 2024, Cher Newcombe-White tweeted that Russell had been hospitalised for terminal lung cancer resulting from long-term chronic obstructive pulmonary disease. On 4 April 2024, Steve Rolles of the Transform Drug Policy Association announced Newcombe's death on Twitter. He was 66.

== Key publications ==
- Newcombe, Russell (1987). "High time for harm reduction" (PDF). Druglink. January/February: 10–11.
