= Mohammed Ibrahim Idris =

Nigerian politician

Federal Representative
- Constituency: Ankpa/Omala/Olamaboro

Personal details
- Born: December 8, 1969
- Died: April 10, 2024 (aged 54)
- Occupation: Politician

Mohammed Ibrahim Idris was a Nigerian politician. He was a former House of Representatives member representing Ankpa, Omala and Olamaboro Federal constituency of Kogi State at the National Assembly from 2011 to 2015. He died on 10 April 2024.

== Early life and education ==
Mohammed was born on 8 December 1969 in Kogi State, Nigeria.

== Personal life ==
Mohammed was the son of a former governor of Kogi State, Ibrahim Idris.

== Political career ==
Mohammed was a Nigerian politician and a member of the People's Democratic Party (PDP). He represented the Ankpa/Omala/Olamaboro Federal Constituency of Kogi State in the House of Representatives of Nigeria from 2011 to 2015.

== Death ==
On 10 April 2024, Mohammed died in Abuja shortly after the Eid al-Fitr prayers. The news was confirmed by Shuaibu Audu in a statement issued through his media special assistant, Lizzy Okoji.
