= Charlotte F. Muller =

American economist (1921–2024)

Charlotte Feldman Muller (February 19, 1921 – April 29, 2024) was an American economist and academic who was professor of economics at the Graduate Center of the City University of New York and associate director for economics at the International Leadership Center on Longevity and Society, Mount Sinai School of Medicine. She is an author of the book Health Care and Gender and numerous scientific articles. Among her research interests were women's health, health care and aging.

== Life ==
Charlotte Muller was born on February 19, 1921. She graduated from Vassar College receiving her A.B. in 1941. In 1942 she earned M.A. and in 1946 Ph.D. in economics from Columbia University.

Muller was married to Dr. Jonas Muller. After his death, she married for the second time to Carl Schoenberg of Teaneck, New Jersey, director of publications for the Child Welfare League of America, Inc. in 1970. She died on April 29, 2024, at the age of 103.

== Career ==
Between 1942 and 1946 Muller worked at Chase National Bank as Research Staff. She taught on Economics faculty of Brooklyn College in 1943, Barnard College in 1943–1946 and Occidental College in 1947. From 1948 to 1950 Muller was a Research Associate in Medical Care at the University of California, Berkeley. In 1952–1953 she was a lecturer in the rank of assistant professor at Yale University. Muller worked at Columbia University as a research associate in 1957–1960 and as an assistant professor in 1960–1967. Later she was a professor of urban studies at Center for Social Research at City University of New York, as well as a professor of economics at Graduate Program in Urban Planning at Hunter College.

Muller was a president of the Public Health Association of New York. In 1978 she was one of the organizers of Census Bureau Conference on Issues in the Federal Statistical Needs Relating to Women.

Muller was later professor emerita of economics at the Graduate Center of the City University of New York and associate director for economics at the International Leadership Center on Longevity and Society at Mount Sinai School of Medicine. She was also a Member of National Academy of Social Insurance.

== Publications (selection) ==
- C.F. Muller, Light Metals Monopoly, New York: Columbia University Press, 1946.
- C.F. Muller, P. Worthington, The Time Structure of Capital Formation: Design and Construction of Municipal Hospital Projects, Inquiry, vol. VI, no. 2, June 1969.
- C.F. Muller, Socioeconomic Outcomes of Restricted Access to Abortion, American Journal of Public Health, June 1971.
- C.F. Muller, The Overmedicated Society: Forces in the marketplace for medical care, Science, vol. 176, 1972.
- C.F. Muller, Testimony, Hearings on Barriers to Health Care for Older Americans, Subcommittee on Health of the Elderly of the Special Committee on Aging, U.S. Senate, 93rd Congress, First Session, March 6, 1973.
- C.F. Muller, F.S. Jaffe, and M.G. Kovar, Reproductive Efficiency as a Social Indicator, International Journal of Health Services, vol. 6, no. 3, 1976.
- C.F. Muller, Methodological Issues in Health Economics Research Relevant to Women, DHEW Publication No. 77-3138. Reprinted in Women and Health, January–February 1976 (US) and Social Science & Medicine vol. 2 1977 (Great Britain).
- C.F. Muller, Review of Twenty Years of Research on Medical Care Utilization, Health Services Research, June 1986, Part 1.
- C. F. Muller, Health Care and Gender—BOOK—Russell Sage Foundation, 1990, (paperback 1992).
- C.F. Muller, Ways of Knowing: Reflections of a Health Economist, Medical Care, October 1993.
- C. F. Muller, C. L. Caton, Economic Costs of Schizophrenia: A Post-Discharge Study, Medical Care, January 1983.
