= Chang Yinfo =

Chinese geologist (1931–2024)

- 常印佛
- Born: 6 July 1931; Taixing County, Jiangsu, China
- Died: 27 April 2024 (aged 92); Hefei, Anhui, China
- Education: Tsinghua University
- Spouse: Wang Deyong
- Scientific career
- Fields: Mineral deposit geology
- Workplaces: Anhui Provincial Geological Bureau

Chang Yinfo (Chinese: 常印佛; pinyin: Cháng Yìnfó; 6 July 1931 – 27 April 2024) was a Chinese mineral deposit geologist, and an academician of the Chinese Academy of Sciences and the Chinese Academy of Engineering.

Chang was a representative of the 13th, 14th, and 15th National Congress of the Chinese Communist Party.

== Biography ==
Chang was born in Taixing County (now Taixing), Jiangsu, on 6 July 1931, to Chang Yisheng (常遗生), and Zhu Zhuoyuan (朱茁沅), both were teachers. He attended Taixing County Private Yanling Middle School, Taixing County Middle School, Zhenjiang High School, and the Affiliated High School of Nanjing Central University. In 1949, he was admitted to Tsinghua University, where he majored in geology.

After graduating in 1952, he was assigned to the Tongling No. 321 Geological Team and was transferred to the Geological and Mineral Resources Department of East China Geological Bureau in July 1955. He moved back to the Tongling No. 321 Geological Team in December 1957, and was promoted to chief engineer in September 1960. He was despatched to Anhui Provincial Geological Bureau in September 1977. He moved up the ranks to become deputy chief engineer in October 1978 and chief engineer in 1982.

In 2002, the University of Science and Technology of China recruited him as Dean of the School of Earth and Space Sciences.

== Personal life and death ==
Chang married Wang Deyong (汪德镛) on 8 June 1957, they had a son and two daughters together. On 27 April 2024, he died in Hefei, Anhui, at the age of 92.

== Honours and awards ==
- 1991 Member of the Chinese Academy of Sciences (CAS)
- 1994 Member of the Chinese Academy of Engineering (CAE)
- 2000 Science and Technology Progress Award of the Ho Leung Ho Lee Foundation
