= Martin Stephens (judge) =

British judge (1939–2024)

His Honour Judge Martin Stephens KC
- Royal coat of arms of the United Kingdom

Circuit judge
- In office 1986–1999
- Appointed by: Elizabeth II

Crown Court Recorder
- In office 1979–1986

Personal details
- Born: 26 June 1939
- Died: 15 April 2024 (aged 84)
- Occupation: Judge

Stephen Martin Stephens KC (26 June 1939 – 15 April 2024) was a British judge. He was called to Bar in 1963 and took Silk in 1982. He was appointed a Recorder in 1979, as a Circuit Judge in 1986 and then appointed a Judge of the Central Criminal Court in 1999. He was a former member of the Parole Board of England and Wales. Stephens died on 15 April 2024, at the age of 84.

== Cases ==
In January 2009 Stephens presided over the trial of James Hopkins accused of murdering Ms Browne, a transsexual prostitute based in Marylebone. Hopkins was found guilty of the murder of Browne who had a number of celebrities among her clients. Prosecuting Hopkins, barrister for the prosecution commented: "There is some evidence that Ms Browne did have some clients who were in the public eye." The court heard that Hopkins' palm prints were found on the Sun and another publication in a plastic bag on the floor. Browne lived in a flat at 6b Gosfield Street, Marylebone, London, and advertised for clients in phone kiosks and newspapers including the Sunday Sport. Police launched a murder inquiry after Browne's body was found in her central London flat in W1 on 28 February 1997.

== See also ==
- Criminal justice
- Judiciary of England and Wales

Legal offices
Unknown	Circuit Judge; 1986–1999	Incumbent
