= Cleuber Brandão Carneiro =

Brazilian politician (1940–2024)

Cleuber Brandão Carneiro (27 January 1940 – 15 April 2024) was a Brazilian politician who served as a Deputy (1999–2007). He died on 15 April 2024, at the age of 84.
