= Sharon Lubinski =

American law enforcement official (1952–2024)

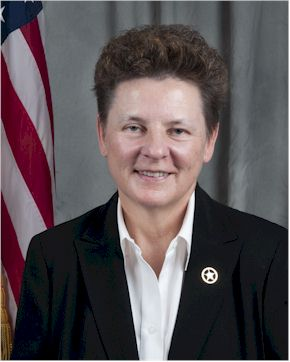
- Lubinski in 2010

United States Marshal for the District of Minnesota
- In office January 2010 – December 2016
- Appointed by: Barack Obama

Personal details
- Born: July 11, 1952
- Died: April 19, 2024 (aged 71)
- Education: University of Wisconsin–Madison; Hamline University

Sharon Jeannette Lubinski (July 11, 1952 – April 19, 2024) was an American law enforcement official who was the United States Marshal for the District of Minnesota. She was the first openly lesbian United States Marshal.

== Early life and education ==
Lubinski earned an undergraduate degree at the University of Wisconsin–Madison and a master's degree from Hamline University in St. Paul, Minnesota.

== Career ==
On October 13, 2009, President Barack Obama nominated Lubinski to serve as United States Marshal for the District of Minnesota. She was sworn into office on January 15, 2010. Lubinski retired on December 31, 2016.

== Death ==
Lubinski died on April 19, 2024, at the age of 71.
