= Kim Christensen (journalist) =

American journalist and investigative reporter (1952-2024)

Kim Martin Christensen (December 1952 – April 15, 2024) was an American journalist and investigative reporter at the Los Angeles Times and two time Pulitzer Prize winner. He also worked for The Capital and The Daily Press.

== Early years ==
A native of Ohio, he was a Dayton native who grew up in the Shiloh area and graduated from Chaminade High School and Wright State University.

== Career ==
In 1995, Christensen was part of a team looking into allegations that fertility doctors at UC Irvine's Center for Reproductive Health were harvesting eggs from women and transferring them into other patients without permission. At least 15 children were born after such transfers. This led to lawsuits and eventually to changes in state and federal law. Christensen's "Bell's money flowed uphill", which was published on July 26, 2010, and won the Pulitzer Prize for Public Service and the Pulitzer Prize for Investigative Reporting for The Orange County Register in 1996. Christensen shared another Pulitzer for investigations of the United States Immigration and Naturalization Service.

== Death ==
Long based on the West Coast, Christensen died of cancer on April 15, 2024, aged 71, in Long Beach, California. He had been diagnosed three months earlier. He was survived, immediately, by his wife and two stepchildren.
