= Jan Ørke =

Norwegian footballer (1931–2024)

Personal information
- Full name: Jan Gunnar Ørke
- Date of birth: 1 September 1931
- Place of birth: Stavanger, Norway
- Date of death: 20 April 2024 (aged 92)
- Place of death: Stavanger, Norway
- Position: Defender

Senior career*
Years	Team	Apps	(Gls)
1949–1962	Viking	103	(2)

International career
1958	Norway	1	(0)
- * Club domestic league appearances and goals

Jan Ørke (1 September 1931 – 20 April 2024) was a Norwegian footballer who played as a defender for Viking FK. He played in one match for the Norway national team in 1958, a 6-5 win against East Germany.

Ørke played for Viking from 1949 to 1962, making a total of 103 appearances in the Norwegian Main League, scoring two goals. He was a member of the Viking side that won the Norwegian Football Cup in 1953, which was the club's first major trophy at the national level. He also became league champion in the 1957–58 season.

Ørke died on 20 April 2024, aged 92. At the time of his death he was the last surviving member of Viking's 1953 cup final team.
