= Lowell Dittmer =

American political scientist (1941–2024)

- Born: 1942
- Died: April 15, 2024 (aged 82); Oakland, California, United States
- Occupations: Professor of Political Science, author
- Years active: 1967–2022

Academic background
- Education: Utah State University
- Alma mater: University of Chicago

Academic work
- Discipline: East Asian Political Science
- Sub-discipline: Contemporary Chinese Politics
- Institutions: University of California, Berkeley

Lowell Dittmer (traditional Chinese: 羅德明, simplified Chinese: 罗德明, 1942 – April 15, 2024) was an author and professor at University of California, Berkeley, where he was a member of the Political Science Department from 1978 until his retirement in 2022. He served as faculty chair of the Center for Chinese Studies (CSS) under the Institute of East Asian Studies (IEAS) from 1979 to 1983, and editor for Asian Survey between the years of 1990 and 2019.

== Biography ==
Alma Lowell Dittmer was born in 1942, to Veda and Alma Dittmer, the latter of whom he would be named after. Initially born into a Mormon family, Dittmer would begin to describe himself as atheist or agnostic following a church-sponsored mission to Switzerland.

Following his return to the United States, Dittmer would enroll in Utah State University, based out of Logan, Utah. Joining the school's madrigal singing troupe and Reserve Officer Training Corps Program (ROTC), Dittmer would graduate with honors with the major of political science in 1965, following a brief exploration of a career in journalism.

After graduation, Dittmer would pursue a Master's degree and PhD from the University of Chicago, both of which he would receive in 1967 and 1971 respectively. Over the course of his time in Chicago, Dittmer would learn Mandarin Chinese. Dittmer's dissertation, Liu Shao-Ch'i and the Chinese Cultural Revolution, would become his first published book. In 1974, he would marry his wife, Helen.

In 1978, he would officially join the University of California, Berkeley, as a professor, where he would later become chair of the UC Center for Chinese Studies between the years of 1979 to 1983 and director for the university's study abroad program in Beijing between 1997 and 1999. Dittmer would serve as an editor for Asian Survey from 1990 to 2001, and would serve in the capacity of editor-in-chief from 2001 until 2019. Additionally, he was a research fellow at the Smithsonian Institution from 1986 to 1987.

Dittmer would officially retire from teaching in 2022, but would remain academically active, publishing his final work, New Asian Disorder: Rivalries Embroiling the Pacific Century, in the same year. On April 15, 2024, Dittmer died in Oakland, California at the age of 82.

== Education ==
Dittmer received a Bachelor of Arts Degree in political science from the Utah State University in 1965 and his Doctorate of Philosophy from the University of Chicago in 1971.

== Selected works ==
=== Books ===
- Dittmer, Lowell (1975). Liu Shao-ch'i and the Chinese Cultural Revolution [刘少奇]. Berkeley: University of California Press. ISBN 978-0520025745.
- Dittmer, Lowell (1986). China's Continuous Revolution: The Post-Revolutionary Epoch, 1949-1981. Berkeley: University of California Press. ISBN 978-0520310575.
- Dittmer, Lowell; Kim, Samuel S. (1993). China's Quest for National Identity. Ithaca: Cornell University Press. ISBN 978-0801427855.
- Dittmer, Lowell; Lee, Peter N. S.; Fukui, Haruhiro (2000). Informal Politics in East Asia. New York: Cambridge University Press. ISBN 978-0521642323.
- Dittmer, Lowell (2005). South Asia's Nuclear Security Dilemma: India, Pakistan, and China. Armonk, New York: M.E. Sharpe. ISBN 978-1317459569.

=== Journal Articles ===
- Dittmer, Lowell (July 1977). "Political Culture and Political Symbolism: Toward a Theoretical Synthesis". World Politics. 29 (4): 552–583. doi:10.2307/2010039.
- Dittmer, Lowell (October 1978). "Bases of Power in Chinese Politics: A Theory and an Analysis of the Fall of the "Gang of Four"". World Politics. 31 (1): 26–60. doi:10.2307/2009966.
- Dittmer, Lowell (July 1981). "The Strategic Triangle: An Elementary Game-Theoretical Analysis". World Politics. 33 (4): 485–515. doi:10.2307/2010133.
- Dittmer, Lowell (July 1995). "Chinese Informal Politics". The China Journal (34): 1–35.
- Dittmer, Lowell; Wu, Yu-shan (July 1995). "The Modernization of Factionalism in Chinese Politics". World Politics. 47 (4): 467–494. doi:10.1017/S0043887100015185.
- Dittmer, Lowell (August 2004). "Taiwan and the Issue of National Identity". Asian Survey. 44 (4): 475–483. doi:10.1525/as.2004.44.4.475.
