= Halilu Kundila =

Nigerian politician

Member of the Kano State House of Assembly
- Constituency: Shanono/Bagwai Constituency

Personal details
- Born: 1965 Kano State, Nigeria
- Died: 6 April 2024 (aged 58–59)
- Party: All Progressives Congress (APC)
- Occupation: Politician

Halilu Ibrahim Kundila (1965 – 6 April 2024) was a Nigerian politician who served as a member of the Kano State House of Assembly, representing the Shanono/Bagwai constituency under the All Progressives Congress (APC). He died on 6 April 2024, at the age of 59.
