= Joel Conarroe =

Joel Osborne Conarroe (October 23, 1934 – April 28, 2024) was an American arts administrator and professor. He was the head of the John Simon Guggenheim Memorial Foundation from 1983 to 2003.
