= Adolf Dinglreiter =

German politician (1935–2024)

- Born: 27 October 1935; Vilshofen an der Donau, Gau Bayreuth, Germany
- Died: 12 April 2024 (aged 88)
- Occupation: Politician
- Political party: Christian Social Union of Bavaria

Adolf Dinglreiter (27 October 1935 – 12 April 2024) was a German politician from the Christian Social Union of Bavaria. He was a member of the Landtag of Bavaria from 1986 to 2003. Dinglreiter died on 12 April 2024, at the age of 88.
