= Harry Marcoplos =

American field hockey player (1926–2024)

Personal information
- Born: January 28, 1926 Baltimore, Maryland, U.S.
- Died: April 11, 2024 (aged 98)

Sport
- Sport: Field hockey

Harry Byron Marcoplos (January 28, 1926 – April 11, 2024) was an American field hockey player. He competed at the 1948 Summer Olympics and the 1956 Summer Olympics. He died on April 11, 2024, at the age of 98.
