= Rosemarie Simmen =

Swiss pharmacist and politician (1938–2024)

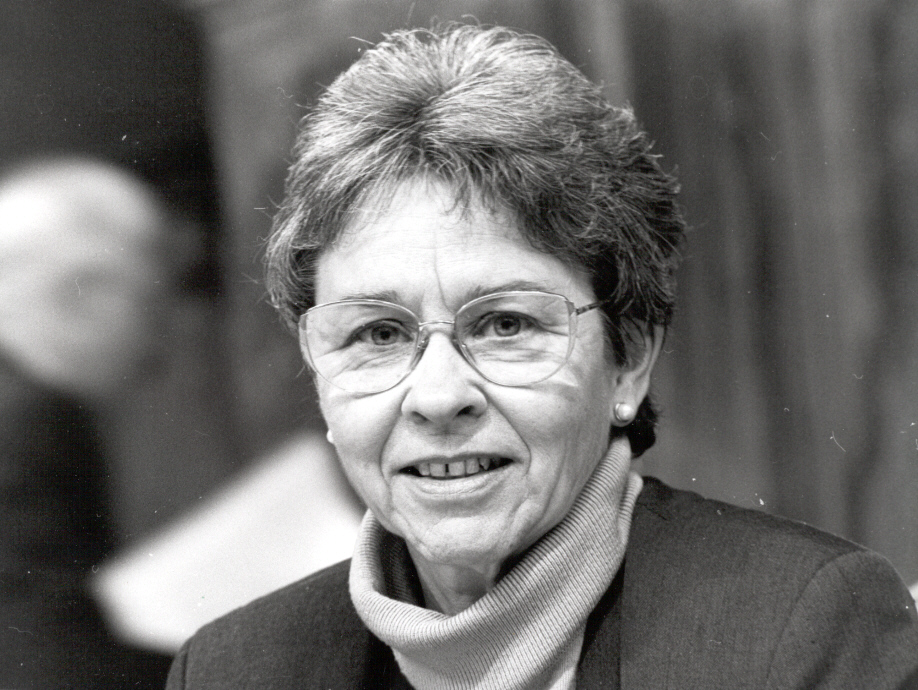
- Simmen in 1994

Member of the Swiss Council of States for Solothurn
- In office 30 November 1987 – 5 December 1999

Member of the Cantonal Council of Solothurn
- In office 1983–1987

Personal details
- Born: Rosemarie Messmer; 10 September 1938 Zürich, Switzerland
- Died: 1 April 2024 (aged 85) Solothurn
- Party: CVP
- Education: ETH Zurich
- Occupation: Pharmacist

Rosemarie Simmen (née Messmer; 10 September 1938 – 1 April 2024) was a Swiss pharmacist and politician of the Christian Democratic People's Party (CVP).

== Biography ==
Born in Zürich on 10 September 1938, Simmen graduated from ETH Zurich with a pharmacy degree. She worked as a pharmacist in Zürich, Geneva, and Berlin.

From 1981 to 1986, Simmen served on the Constituent Assembly of Solothurn. From 1983 to 1987, she served on the Cantonal Council of Solothurn. From 1987 to 1999, she represented the Canton of Solothurn in the Council of States. She ran for election as President of the Council of States, but the CVP preferred Anton Cottier as their candidate. From 1996 to 1997, she was a member of the Swiss delegation to the Inter-Parliamentary Union. From 1990 to 1997, she was president of Pro Helvetia. From 1999 to 2001, she chaired the Federal Commission for Foreigners. She also chaired the commission of the Swiss National Library from 1999 to 2007.

Simmen died on 1 April 2024, at the age of 85 in Solothurn.
