= Paolo Caccia =

Italian politician (1937–2024)

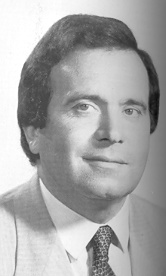

Member of the Chamber of Deputies of Italy for Como-Varese
- In office 14 June 1979 – 14 April 1994

Personal details
- Born: Paolo Pietro Cesare Caccia; 22 April 1937 Busto Arsizio, Italy
- Died: 3 April 2024 (aged 86) Busto Arsizio
- Party: DC (until 1994); PPI (after 1994)
- Occupation: Psychologist

Paolo Pietro Cesare Caccia (22 April 1937 – 3 April 2024) was an Italian psychologist and politician. A member of Christian Democracy, he served in the Chamber of Deputies from 1979 to 1994.

Caccia died in Busto Arsizio on 3 April 2024, at the age of 86.
