= Keith Kendall =

Australian cricketer (1929–2024)

Personal information
- Full name: Keith Harold Dudley Kendall
- Born: 16 March 1929; South Melbourne, Victoria, Australia
- Died: 21 April 2024 (aged 95); Viewbank, Melbourne, Victoria, Australia
- Batting: Right-handed

Domestic team information
- Years: Team
- 1955–1960: Victoria

Career statistics
Competition	First-class
Matches	17
Runs scored	668
Batting average	27.83
100s/50s	1/3
Top score	119
Balls bowled	8
Wickets	0
Bowling average	–
5 wickets in innings	–
10 wickets in match	–
Best bowling	–
Catches/stumpings	8/–
- Source: Cricinfo, 4 May 2024

Keith Harold Dudley Kendall (16 March 1929 – 21 April 2024) was an Australian cricketer. He played 17 first-class cricket matches for Victoria between 1955 and 1960.

Kendall was a middle-order batsman. His only first-class century was 119 for Victoria against South Australia in November 1956.

Kendall died at home in Viewbank, Melbourne, on 21 April 2024, at the age of 95.
