= Daphne Douglas =

Jamaican librarian (1924–2024)

Daphne Douglas CD
- Born: 26 September 1924; Kingston, Jamaica
- Died: April 2024 (aged 99)
- Occupation: Librarian

Academic background
- Education: University of Pittsburgh

Academic work
- Institutions: University of the West Indies

Daphne Rowena Douglas CD (26 September 1924 – April 2024) was a Jamaican librarian, academic and public servant. She was the first Jamaican woman to become a professor at the University of the West Indies, where she was head of the Department of the Library Studies, and later served as chairman of the National Library of Jamaica from 1997 to 2011. Douglas died in April 2024, at the age of 99.

== Early life ==
Douglas was born in Kingston, Jamaica, to Rowena Theresa (née Davis) and Thomas Edson Douglas. She grew up in Brown's Town, attending St. Hilda's High School, and later returned to Kingston to attend Suthermere Commercial School. Douglas joined the Jamaica Civil Service in 1944 as a secretary and stenotypist. After studying library science in Trinidad and the UK, she was admitted to the British Library Association and began working for the Jamaica Library Service in 1956. She was chief librarian of the Institute of Jamaica from 1961 to 1963 and librarian of the Permanent Mission of Jamaica to the United Nations from 1963 to 1964.

== Academic career ==
In 1971, Douglas became a foundation lecturer in the Department of the Library Studies of the University of the West Indies (UWI) at Mona. She subsequently undertook further studies in the United States on an OAS fellowship, graduating with a Master of Library Science degree from the University of Pittsburgh in 1974. Douglas was elevated to professor of library studies in 1984, becoming the first Jamaican woman to hold a full professorship at UWI (and the third woman overall). She served as head of department from 1976 to 1980 and from 1982 to 1993, and upon her retirement in 1994 was made a professor emeritus.

== Other work and honours ==
Douglas served on the executive of the Association of Caribbean University, Research and Institutional Libraries for six years, and was president in 1984. She was a long-serving board member of the National Library of Jamaica, and after her retirement from UWI served as chairman from 1997 to 2011, replacing Joyce Robinson. In 1993, Douglas was made a Commander of the Order of Distinction.
