= Suryatna Subrata =

Indonesian military officer (1939–2024)

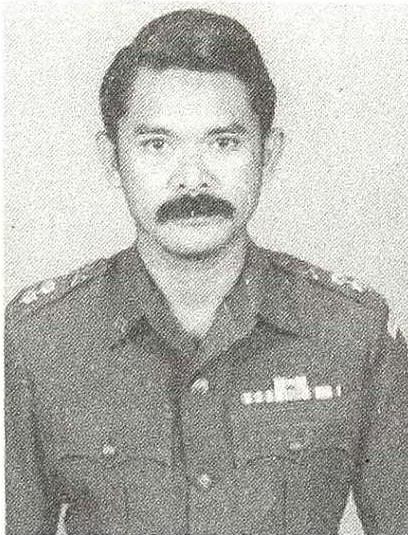
- Subrata in 1977

Member of Supreme Advisory Council
- In office 13 June 1998 – 31 July 2003
- President: B.J. Habibie; Abdurrahman Wahid; Megawati Sukarnoputri

Vice Governor of West Java
- In office 14 September 1987 – 27 October 1992
- Governor: Yogie Suardi Memet
- Preceded by: Aboeng Koesman
- Succeeded by: Achmad Sampurna

Personal details
- Born: 1939 Cianjur, Dutch East Indies
- Died: 5 April 2024 (aged 84–85) Cimahi, West Java, Indonesia

Suryatna Subrata (1939 – 5 April 2024) was an Indonesian military officer, bureaucrat and politician. He was a member of the Supreme Advisory Council between 1998 and 2003, and had previously become secretary-general of the Ministry of Home Affairs and the Vice Governor of West Java.

== Early life ==
Suryatna Subrata was born in Cianjur, in what is today West Java province, in 1939. After completing high school, he enrolled at the Army Academy, graduating as part of the class of 1961. He would later also study at the Indonesian Army Command and General Staff College and at the National Resilience Institute.

== Military career ==
By 1977, Suryatna had been assigned to the Siliwangi Military Region, as an assistant to the unit's chief of staff. In 1978, he was assigned to the Philippines as defense attache, remaining there until 1981. Upon his return to Indonesia, he was appointed chief of staff of a military district within Siliwangi, then as its commander with the rank of colonel in 1982. He remained in this post until 1984. He held the final rank of honorary lieutenant general.

== Government career ==
Suryatna was appointed the Vice Governor of West Java on 14 September 1987, replacing Aboeng Kosman. He held the post until 1992, and his replacement, Achmad Sampurna, was appointed on 27 October 1992. In May 1993, he was appointed secretary-general of the Department of Home Affairs, serving until April 1998.

He served as a member of the Supreme Advisory Council between 1998 and 2003.

== Later life and death ==
He died on 5 April 2024 at the Dustira hospital in Cimahi, West Java. He was buried at his family's cemetery in Bandung.
