= Lawrence Adams (English politician) =

Lawrence Adams (died before 1645), of Totnes and Dartington, Devon, was an English politician.

== Biography ==
His date of birth is unknown, but he was the son of William Adams of Totnes. He married twice, first time in 1597 to Mary, daughter of William Gould of Staverton, Devon and widow of George Martyn. The second wife was Elizabeth Wise whom he married in 1615.

He held the following offices: Master in Totnes by 1615-death, mayor from 1615 to 1616, and in 1633–1634. He was a Member (MP) of the Parliament of England for Totnes in 1614. He supported the campaign of the House of Commons against the French Company, which was led by the Plymouth Member, Sir William Strode.

He came from a family of merchant and "made his living primarily by trading in cloth with France". By 1610 he was the most famous merchant in Totnes, not only exporting cloth to France but also trading in Newfoundland train oil and Mediterranean almonds. Beginning from 1624 he started investing in land along with his being active in trading.

Adams died in June 1645, and was buried at Totnes. He was the only member of Parliament in his family.
