= Doros Christodoulidis =

Cypriot politician (1946–2024)

- Δώρος Χριστοδουλίδης

Member of the House of Representatives of Cyprus for Larnaca
- In office 30 May 1991 – 31 May 2006

Member of the European Parliament for Cyprus
- In office 1 May 2004 – 19 July 2004

Personal details
- Born: 28 March 1946 Larnaca District, British Cyprus
- Died: 2 April 2024 (aged 78) Larnaca District, Cyprus
- Party: AKEL; Citizens' Alliance
- Education: First Moscow State Medical University
- Occupation: Cardiologist

Doros Christodoulidis (Greek: Δώρος Χριστοδουλίδης; 28 March 1946 – 2 April 2024) was a Cypriot cardiologist and politician. A member of the Progressive Party of Working People, he served in the House of Representatives from 1991 to 2004 and in the European Parliament from May to July 2004.

Christodoulidis died in Larnaca District on 2 April 2024, at the age of 78.
