= Lawrence Whalley =

British psychiatrist (1946–2024)

Lawrence J. Whalley FRCPE (12 March 1946 – 11 April 2024) was a British psychiatrist who was the Crombie Ross Professor of Mental Health in the University of Aberdeen, from 1992 to 2008. He was later a professor emeritus there, and from 2010 to 2020, a part-time professor of research at the University of the Highlands and Islands.

== Early life and education ==
Whalley was born in Lancashire, England on 12 March 1946. He attended St Joseph's College, Blackpool (now St Mary's Catholic Academy), 1954–64, graduated in Medicine from the University of Newcastle upon Tyne in 1969. He was a registered postgraduate student in the Universities of Oxford (1970–71), Edinburgh (1971–73) and Newcastle upon Tyne (1973–76).

== Career ==
Whalley completed higher training in general and old age psychiatry in SE Scotland and forensic psychiatry in the State Hospital Carstairs (1974–77). He joined the senior clinical scientific staff at the MRC Brain Metabolism Unit, Edinburgh University (1978–1986), senior lecturer in psychiatry (Edinburgh University, 1986–1991). He was honorary consultant psychiatrist Lothian Health Board (1978–1991).

== Professional roles ==
Honorary Secretary of Higher Training Committee, Royal College of Psychiatrists (1996-2001); Scientific Advisory Board, Research in Ageing; EURODEM advisory board, 1984-6.

== Research ==
His MD thesis (1976) tested hypotheses derived from psychodynamic psychotherapy that sexual maladjustment predisposed to alcoholism in men. In the University of Edinburgh with MRC support, he studied the epidemiology of EOAD in Scotland (1974–1988), found non-random urban "clusters" of EOAD and identified childhood environmental factors which increased risk and reduced survival after dementia onset. Using kinship analysis, he showed ancestral genes could only partly explain some "clusters" and these genes were of small effect at a population level. Together with Ian Deary and John Starr, he began prospective studies of cognitive decline and vascular risk factors in 1300 healthy old people in Edinburgh. In 1997, with the assistance of the Scottish Council for Research in Education, he was granted access to a unique national archive of childhood IQ data (N~160,000) that could be used to estimate lifelong cognitive variation. No other country has ever IQ tested a total population sample in this way. In 1998, he devised a strategy to recruit 285 Aberdeen survivors all born in 1921 of the Scottish Mental Survey of 1932 (subjects by then aged 77) and next, from 1999, he recruited 506 survivors all born in 1936 from a second 1947 Survey (subjects by then aged 63–64 years). These groundbreaking studies were capitalized upon by Ian Deary in Edinburgh who followed up with much more intensive subsequent studies that formed "The Disconnected Mind Project" of adults by then aged 69 years and also born in 1936. Deary consolidated this research program into the internationally renowned Edinburgh University Centre for Cognitive Ageing and Cognitive Epidemiology. With the support from a Welcome Professorial Senior Fellowship (2001–2006), Whalley extended his Aberdeen database and followed up these cohorts biennially to 2015. He showed that dementia incidence is greater in those of lower childhood IQ, that lifetime variation in cognitive performance is linked to specific genetic factors, smoking, nutritional factors, childhood intelligence, and education. His research colleagues led by Professor Roger Staff developed advanced statistical models of longitudinal changes in cognitive performance in Whalley's cohorts that include findings from longitudinal brain MRI studies and measures of information processing efficiency. With Deary and Starr, parallel follow-up studies were begun at Edinburgh University.

== Publications ==
Whalley is best known for follow-up studies of 757 Aberdeen City and Shire residents who took part at age 11 years in the Scottish Mental Surveys of 1932 and 1947. He has authored or co-authored more than 300 (Google H-index = 76 in 2023) peer-reviewed reports of which >100 were published after retiring from the University of Aberdeen, seven books and contributed to many TV and radio programs mostly about the dementias of old age, notably at the Hay on Wye Literary Festival (2001, 2002); the Ottawa Writers Festival (2002) and the Oxford Literary Festival (2016). He co-authored "A lifetime of Intelligence" with Deary & Starr (published by the American Psychological Association in 2009) and "Dementia" with John Breitner (Montreal) in 2002 and 2010. In 2010-15, he was among the most highly cited academic staff members at the University of Aberdeen.

Whalley's popular science account of "The Ageing Brain" (Phoenix Press, 2004, published in the U.S. and translated into Spanish, Italian and Japanese) describes some of his research findings on brain structural and functional magnetic resonance imaging, nutrition, genetics and physical health and how these explain differences in individual rates of aging of some mental abilities while others are relatively preserved. His work "Understanding brain aging and dementia: a life course approach" was published in 2015 by Columbia University Press ISBN 978-0-231-16382-8. He lectured widely in United Kingdom, U.S., South Africa, Canada, and Australia mostly about dementia and severe forms of mental illness.

== Personal life and death ==
Whalley took early retirement from the University of Aberdeen in 2008 to focus exclusively on his research. After spending a period in the University of Southern California (curtailed by illness), he returned to Edinburgh, where he remained. In 2010 he was appointed until 2020 to the part-time staff of the University of the Highlands and Islands with the remit to develop a community-based dementia research program relevant to a rural community.

Whalley died in Edinburgh on 11 April 2024, at the age of 78.

== Honours and awards ==
- Elected Honorary Fellow of the Royal College of Physicians of Edinburgh (1998).
- Recipient of the Margaret McLellan Award for research in ageing (2009)

== Books ==
- Whalley, LJ Understanding Brain Aging and Dementia: A Life Course Approach. pub Columbia University Press (4 Aug. 2015). ISBN 978-0231163835
- Deary IJ, Whalley LJ & Starr JM. A Lifetime of Intelligence: Follow-up Studies of the Scottish Mental Surveys of 1932 and 1947. pub American Psychological Association; 1 edition (15 Feb. 2009). ISBN 978-1433804007.
- Whalley LJ & Breitner JS. Fast Facts: Dementia. pub Health Press Limited; First edition (1 Nov. 2002). ISBN 978-1899541782
- Whalley LJ The Ageing Brain (maps of the mind). pub Phoenix; New edition (5 Dec. 2002). ISBN 978-0753813614.
- Whalley LJ & Breitner JS. Fast Facts: Dementia. pub Health Press Limited; First edition (1 Nov. 2002). ISBN 978-1899541782;
- Whalley LJ: The Aging Brain. pub Columbia University Press (30 April 2003); ISBN 978-0231120258.
- Whalley LJ: Cuando el Cerebro envejece (Spanish). pub Ediciones Entretres (Jan. 2007). ISBN 978-8493486686.
- Whalley LJ. Cervelli che non invecchiano. Conoscere e contrastare l'invecchiamento cerebrale. (Italian) pub Giunti Editore (April 2012)’ (Italian). ISBN 978-8809748682.
- Starr JM & Whalley LJ. ACE Inhibitors: Central Actions. Lippincott Williams & Wilkins (1 Dec. 1993) ISBN 978-0781700726
- Fink G & Whalley LJ. Neuropeptides: Basic and Clinical Aspects. Churchill Livingstone (1 Jun. 1982) ISBN 978-0443025372
- Glen AIM & Whalley LJ. Alzheimer's Disease: Early Recognition of Potentially Reversible Deficits. Churchill Livingstone (17 Dec. 1979). ISBN 978-0443020803.

== Sources ==
- Biography
