= Charles F. Mertens =

American politician (1933–2024)

Member of the North Dakota House of Representatives
- In office 1971–1990

Personal details
- Born: January 3, 1933
- Died: April 13, 2024 (aged 91)
- Party: Democratic

Charles F. Mertens (January 3, 1933 – April 13, 2024) was an American politician. He served as a Democratic member of the North Dakota House of Representatives.

== Life and career ==
Mertens was a businessman and farmer.

Mertens served in the North Dakota House of Representatives from 1971 to 1990.

Mertens died on April 13, 2024, at the age of 91.
