= Ernesto Wong =

Cuban-Italian baseball player and coach (1973–2024)

Ernesto Wong (1973 – 15 April 2024) was a Cuban-Italian baseball player and coach.

== Biography ==
Born in Cuba, Wong started playing baseball at a very young age in his native country. He played in several seasons of Cuba's national baseball series and won one of the three university championships in which he participated. He attended a faculty equivalent to motor sciences and specializing as a coach.

At the end of the 1990s, he abandoned high-level sporting activity due to work and in 2003 he moved to Settimo Torinese in Turin, Italy, alongside his Italian wife, where he collaborated on a project to enlarge a baseball field in the town. For many seasons the Settimo club has been represented in all youth championships, and collected regional category titles and reached the national finals several times, bringing various athletes into the academy and the regional representative of Piedmont. In September 2019, Settimo's baseball team turned in to the A category, the major one for sports in Italy. Wong also played in Milan's team, bringing the team to Serie A after major wins.

Wong died on 15 April 2024, during a workplace accident in China, which occurred on a pipe-laying ship. Wong was 50, and had worked as an industrial plumber.
