= Pekka J. Korvenheimo =

Finnish diplomat

Pekka Juhani Korvenheimo (17 January 1941 Helsinki – 18 April 2024 Helsinki) was a Finnish diplomat, a master of political science.

== Career ==
=== Student times and politics ===
During his studies, Korvenheimo was the Secretary of the Ylioppilaslehti and vice president. 1961–1963, Secretary General of the Student Union of the University of Helsinki 1966–1967, and prior to the Ministry for Foreign Affairs he was the Social Democratic Party's International Affairs Research and Information Semiotics 1967–1970.

In addition, Korvenheimo was a Social Democratic student leader during his studies and the first president of the United Nations Student Association. He has been involved in the Social Democratic Party since the late 1950s. Korvenheimo was nominated as a party secretary candidate in 1969, but ultimately lost to Kalevi Sorsa. Jukka Seppinen has later claimed in his book Kalevi Sorsa, SDP:n vallan vakauttaja (2008), that the Soviet Union labeled Korvenheimo as a right wing candidate in attempt to influence the vote.

=== As Diplomat ===
Korvenheimo has worked as Secretary of the Ministry for Foreign Affairs in Rio de Janeiro and in Prague from 1971 to 1975, as Chargé d'Affaires in Lisbon 1975–1978, as Assistant Director in the Department of Political Affairs in 1978-1982 and in Brazil as Ambassador 1982-1987 as Foreign Affairs Officer in 1987–1989; Ambassador in Tel Aviv 1989–1993; Buenos Aires, 1993–1996. he was an ambassador in Madrid 1996-2001 and Santiago de Chile 2003–2006
