= J. A. Garcia Jr. =

American politician (1936–2024)

Member of the Texas House of Representatives from the 48-F district
- In office May 27, 1968 – January 14, 1969

Member of the Texas House of Representatives from the 46-3 district
- In office January 14, 1969 – July 31, 1972

Personal details
- Born: Joseph Alexander Garcia Jr. September 26, 1936 Brownsville, Texas, U.S.
- Died: April 15, 2024 (aged 87) Kenedy County, Texas, U.S.
- Party: Democratic

Joseph Alexander Garcia Jr. (September 26, 1936 – April 15, 2024) was an American politician. He served as a Democratic member for the 46-3 and 48-F district of the Texas House of Representatives.

== Life and career ==
Joseph Alexander Garcia Jr. was born in Brownsville, Texas on September 26, 1936. He served in the Texas House of Representatives from 1968 to 1972. Garcia died in Kenedy County, Texas on April 15, 2024, at the age of 87.
