= George Wingert =

American politician (1931–2024)

Member of the Kansas House of Representatives
- In office 1971–1978

Personal details
- Born: May 26, 1931 Wellsville, Kansas, U.S.
- Died: April 1, 2024 (aged 92) Ottawa, Kansas, U.S.
- Party: Democratic
- Education: Kansas State University

George Wingert (May 26, 1931 – April 1, 2024) was an American politician. He served as a Democratic member of the Kansas House of Representatives.

== Life and career ==
George Wingert was born in Wellsville, Kansas on May 26, 1931. He attended Kansas State University and served in the United States Army. He served in the Kansas House of Representatives from 1971 to 1978. Wingert died in Ottawa, Kansas on April 1, 2024, at the age of 92.
