= Por Esto! =

Por Esto! (English: "This is Why!") is a daily Mexican newspaper headquartered in Mérida, Yucatán. It has offices in Cancún, Quintana Roo, and several bureaus. It largely covers the Mexican states of Yucatán, Campeche, and Quintana Roo, giving it significant circulation.

In 1997, a series of investigative articles implicated Roberto Hernández Ramírez, then the general-director of Mexican bank Banamex, as a narcotrafficker. Both Por Esto! and Narco News were unsuccessfully sued for libel.

== See also ==
- List of newspapers in Mexico
