= Laurie Adams =

English footballer (1931–2024)

Personal information
- Date of birth: 14 February 1931
- Place of birth: Chipping Barnet, England
- Date of death: 29 April 2024 (aged 93)
- Position: Forward

Senior career*
Years	Team	Apps	(Gls)
1951–1952	Watford	1	
1955	Whipton		
- * Club domestic league appearances and goals

Laurence Edward Adams (14 February 1931 – 29 April 2024) was an English footballer, who played for Watford as an inside left. Born in Barnet (then part of Hertfordshire), he made his sole Football League appearance while doing his National Service. Under the management of Haydn Green, Adams played a full match on 23 February 1952, as Watford defeated Walsall 2–0 in front of a crowd of 8,909 at Vicarage Road. He turned professional upon leaving the army, but did not play another senior game, and left the club at the end of the 1952–53 season. Although at that time professional players were not normally allowed to play amateur football again, Adams subsequently played for Whipton as a permit player in 1955. Adams died on 29 April 2024, at the age of 93.
