= Katherin Kovin Pacino =

American actress and child advocate (1952–2024)

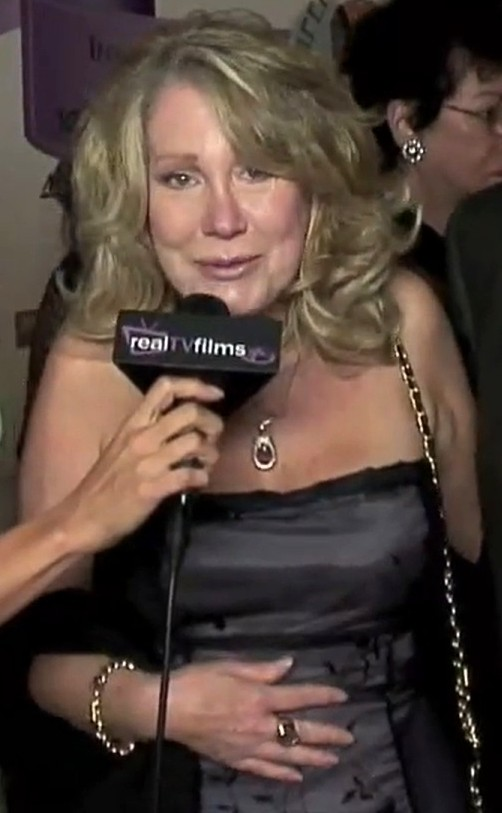
- Pacino in 2009
- Born: Katherin Kovin; 1952; Chicago, Illinois, U.S.
- Died: April 27, 2024 (aged 71–72)
- Occupation: Actress
- Spouse: Sal Pacino

Katherin Kovin Pacino (1952 – April 27, 2024) was an American actress and child advocate.

== Life and career ==
Pacino was born in Chicago, Illinois in 1952. She was married to Sal Pacino until his death in 2005.

Pacino acted in over 15 films. She died on April 27, 2024.

== Filmography ==
- Mansfield Killings
- Death Realm
- Who's Gonna Take Care of Me?
