= Michael J. Roads =

English-born Australian author (1937–2024)

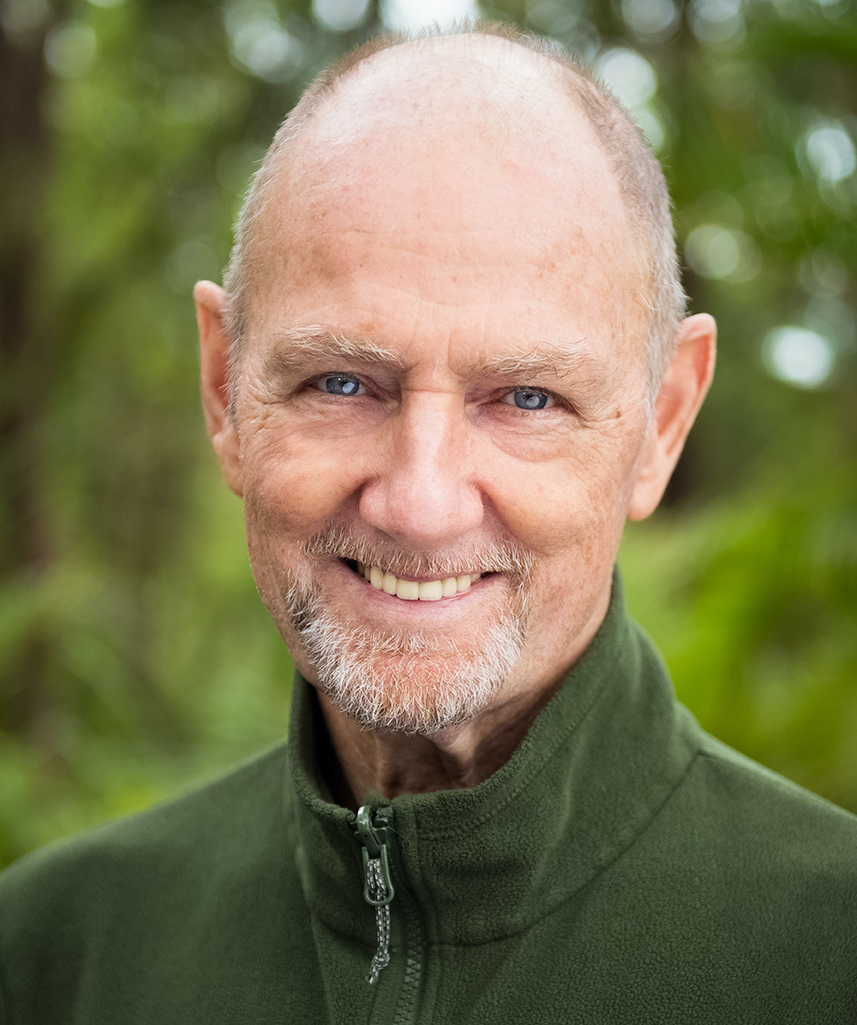
- Born: 14 April 1937; Cambridgeshire, United Kingdom
- Died: 28 April 2024 (aged 87); Sunshine Coast, Queensland
- Occupations: Spiritual teacher, author
- Spouse: Carolyn Roads
- Writing career
- Genres: Spirituality, metaphysics, nature
- Notable works: Talking with Nature; Journey into Nature; From Illusion to Enlightenment; Getting There; Entering the Secret World of Nature
- Website: www.michaelroads.com

Michael Joseph Roads (14 April 1937 – 28 April 2024) was a UK-born resident of Australia and an author of essays, articles and books including Talking with Nature – Journey Into Nature, Journey Into Oneness and Into a Timeless Realm. His more recent books include the award-winning novel Getting There, Through the Eyes of Love, Journeying with Pan (Books One, Two and Three), Insights of a Modern Mystic, Stepping Between Realities, From Illusion to Enlightenment and Entering the Secret World of Nature.

== Biography ==
Michael J. Roads was born in Cambridgeshire, England, and grew up as a farmer's son. He left school as early as he could and worked for his father. At the age of 21, he married his first wife, Treenie (née Barker), with whom he emigrated to Australia in 1964. Together, they had a beef and dairy farm and raised four children. During this time, he became one of the key members that initiated the Australian organic movement and he wrote his first book, on organic gardening, which became a bestseller. After selling the farm in the mid-70s, he and his late wife co-founded a spiritual community, which they left after four years, eventually moving to the Belligen Valley on the east coast of Australia. In 2007 he remarried Carolyn (née Silver). They resided on the Sunshine Coast of Queensland.

In 1986 he experienced what he described as "a profound leap into a higher state of consciousness" and began writing his books and giving public talks. For over thirty years, Roads has been a writer and spiritual teacher in many countries around the world.

== Teachings ==
In his writings, he focused on spiritual growth, conscious living, and a profound connection with nature and all life.

As well as in his own publications, Roads and his work have appeared in the publications and videos of a number of other writers, including Healthy-Living magazine, Wake-up World magazine, Polly Darling, GaiamTV's, Lilou Mace, Rick Archer, Buddha at the Gas Pump,

== Publications ==
- A guide to organic living in Australia, ISBN 978-0959920765, M. Fisher Bookshop, 1977
- Talking with Nature: Sharing the Energies and Spirit of Trees, Plants, Birds, and Earth, ISBN 978-0915811069, H.J. Kramer; 1987
- The natural magic of mulch: organic gardening Australian style, ISBN 978-0864362438, Greenhouse Publications, 1989
- Journey into Nature: A Spiritual Adventure, ISBN 978-0915811199, H.J. Kramer; 1990
- Simple Is Powerful: Anecdotes for a Complex World, ISBN 978-0915811359, H J Kramer, 1991
- Journey into Oneness: A Spiritual Odyssey, ISBN 978-0915811540, H.J. Kramer,1994
- Into a Timeless Realm: A Metaphysical Adventure, ISBN 978-0915811663, H.J. Kramer, 1996
- Getting There, ISBN 978-1571741042, Hampton Roads Publishing Company, 1998
- The Magic Formula, ISBN 978-0972914512, Silverroads Pub, June 2003
- Talking with Nature, Journey into Nature, ISBN 978-1932073058, H.J. Kramer, 16 July 2003
- More Than Money, True Prosperity: A Wholistic Guide to Having It All, ISBN 978-0972914529, Silverroads Pub, 2004
- The Oracle, ISBN 9780975847602, Roadslight, 2005
- The Boy with No Shadow, ISBN 978-0956585103, Pineal Press, 2010
- Conscious Gardening: Practical and Metaphysical Expert Advice to Grow Your Garden Organically, ISBN 978-1844095490, Quintessence, 2011
- A Glimpse of Something Greater, ISBN 978-1452475455, Six Degrees Publishing Group, 2011
- Sago, the Caterpillar Who Wanted to Fly: The Teachings of Buzz-Buzz, the Enlightened Bumble Bee, ISBN 978-1479167340, CreateSpace Independent Publishing Platform, 2013
- Through the Eyes of Love, Book One, ISBN 978-0985604844 Six Degrees Publishing Group, 2013
- Through the Eyes of Love, Book Two, ISBN 978-0985604851, Six Degrees Publishing Group, 2013
- Through the Eyes of Love, Book Three, ISBN 978-0985604820, Six Degrees Publishing Group, 2013
- Stepping Between Realities, ISBN 978-0985604868, Six Degrees Publishing Group, 2014
- Insights of a Modern Mystic, ISBN 978-1942497127, Six Degrees Publishing Group, 2015
- From Illusion to Enlightenment, ISBN 978-1942497240, Six Degrees Publishing Group, 2017
- Entering the Secret World of Nature, ISBN 978-1942497394, Six Degrees Publishing Group, 2018
- Pan...and Me: Metaphysical Adventures with the Spirit of Nature, ISBN 978-1942497547, Six Degrees Publishing Group, 2023

== Video ==
- Michael Roads Videos, YouTube

== DVD ==
- Choose Love, Wähle Liebe, Choisir L'Amour, New World View
