= God's World =

1962 short story collection by Naguib Mahfouz

God’s World (Dunyā Allah)
- Author: Naguib Mahfouz
- Translators: Akef Abadir and Roger Allen
- Language: Arabic/English
- Genre: Short Stories
- Published: 1962
- Publisher: Egyptian publishing house and distribution
- Publication place: Egypt
- Pages: 197

God's World (Dunyā Allah) is a short story collection by the Egyptian writer Naguib Mahfouz. The collection consists of fourteen stories, long and short. In his collection, Mahfouz takes the reader through Al-Ḥusayn suburbs and Al-'Abbasiyya streets before stopping on Alexandria’s beach and passing through the cemeteries before taking them to a wedding, leading out of a mosque, and finally heading to a bar. This short story collection acts as a lens, clarifying reality. He presents the lives of people from all classes, using aesthetics and concise language. The stories in the collection were published separately in Al-Ahram newspaper between 1961-1962, and they present causes and visions relevant to the 1950s and early 1960s. ‘God’s World’ was published 25 years after the publication of Mahfouz's first short story collection ‘Hams Al-Junun' or ‘Whisper of Madness.’ During the period between these two collections, Mahfouz had already established himself as a novelist, for some of his most notable novels were published during that period, like ‘Autumn Quail’ and ‘Medaq Alley.’ It is believed that his becoming a member of Al-Ahram's editorial team drove him to pick up his interest in short stories once more.

== About The Novel ==
One of Mahfouz's most popular works, the collection gained traction amidst thinkers, readers, and critics, as well as common people. The collection became a bestseller during its publication, and its popularity persists today. It is considered to be one of Mahfouz's most symbolic works, and this was verified by the Nobel Prize committee in 1988. The committee stated that the collection is an artistic work navigating existentialist questions. Additionally, the Syrian writer Georges Tarabichi dedicated a whole chapter in his book (God in Naguib Mahfouz's Symbolistic Journey (Allah fi rihlat Najib Mahfuz al-ramziyyah)) to analyzing and explaining of the stories in the collection, “Zaabalawi.” Tarabichi and other critics state that “Zaabalawi” is the core story of his popular nove (Children of Gebelawi).

== Stories in The Collection ==
The collection consists of 14 short stories:

- Closeness to God (Jiwaru Allah): This story centers on greed, as an elderly woman lies on the verge of death, her children await her death and divide her inheritance before the burial ceremony is even over.
- The Mosque in The Path (Aj-Jamiʿ Fi Ad-Darb): A simple philosophical tale discussing hypocrisy and its consequences.
- Zaina: Three stories showcasing what some people are willing to give up for their job; those who give up their principles, those who give up their bodies, and those who give up everything.
- An Appointment (Mawʿid): A darkly comic approach to death; the reader is left mocking fear of death for it is inevitable.
- Zaabalawi: The most notable story in the collection, discussing humanity's eternal search for God, and whether he is real or not.
- The Killer (Qatil): A story following a man whose identity is unknown, lest for the fact that he is a killer. It follows this man's crimes and inner conflicts, leaving the reader wondering the reason behind his crimes.
- Against An Unknown (Ḍid Majhul): Another story dealing with death and the futility of trying to comprehend it.
- God's World (Dunya Allah)
- An Accident (Ḥaditha)
- Ḥanẓal and The Militant (Ḥanẓal Wal ʿAsakri)
- An Unusual Delega te (Mandub Fawqal ʿĀda)
- Old Pictures (Ṣuwarun Qadima)
