= Valentina Colombo =

Italian scholar

- Born: 1964 (age 61–62); Cameri, Italy
- Education: Cattolica University; Istituto Universitario Orientale (PhD)
- Occupations: Author; translator; scholar
- Spouse: Magdi Allam

Valentina Colombo (born 1964) is an Italian author, translator and professor of history of contemporary Islam at the European University of Rome, and Senior Fellow at the European Foundation for Democracy in Brussels.

== Biography ==
Colombo was born in Cameri. She graduated in Arabic Language and Literature from Cattolica University, Milan, and received a Ph.D. in Islamic Studies from Istituto Universitario Orientale, Naples. She has been a Distinguished Senior Fellow at Gatestone Institute, a member of the Board of Guarini Institute for Public Affairs at John Cabot University, Rome, a member of the scientific board of the Center Di-con-per Donne, University of Rome Tor Vergata, of the scientific board of the Institute of High Studies for Women, Rome, and a member of the Committee for Italian Islam, Ministry of Interior. She has taught at the University of Bologna, the Sapienza University of Rome, the Tuscia of Viterbo, the Sacro Cuore of Milan and at the School of Higher Studies at Lucca.

Colombo is the official Italian translator of the Nobel Prize winner Naguib Mahfouz, and other authors of classical and contemporary Arabic literature. In 2004, she edited an anthology of 20th century Arab writers in L'altro Mediterraneo: Antologia di scrittori arabi del Novecento. In 2005, she was the editor of the anthology of short stories Parola di donna, corpo di donna: antologia di scrittrici arabe contemporanee, a collection of 31 contemporary Arab women writers. She edited another anthology of 29 Arab poets in the book Non ho peccato abbastanza: antologia di poetesse arabe contemporanee in 2007. The same year, she edited Basta!: Musulmani contro l'estremismo islamico, an anthology of essays from over 50 writers of Muslim background against Islamic extremism.

In her own writings, Colombo argues that the Muslim Brotherhood is infiltrating European societies in an effort to establish an Islamic state, and that it is connected to terrorist organisations. In 2012, she participated in the international counter-jihad conference in Brussels, billed as the "International Conference for Free Speech & Human Rights". She was also announced as a speaker at a conference of Stop Islamization of Nations (SION) in New York City the same year.

== Personal life ==
Colombo is married to Egyptian-Italian Magdi Allam, and they have a son together.

== Bibliography ==
=== Anthologies ===
- L'altro Mediterraneo: Antologia di scrittori arabi del Novecento. Mondadori. 2004. ISBN 9788804534075.
- Parola di donna, corpo di donna: antologia di scrittrici arabe contemporanee. Mondadori. 2005. ISBN 9788804547884.
- Non ho peccato abbastanza: antologia di poetesse arabe contemporanee. Mondadori. 2007. ISBN 9788804564386.
- Basta!: Musulmani contro l'estremismo islamico. Mondadori. 2007. ISBN 9788804564027.

=== Translated books ===
- Mahfouz, Naguib (1989) [1975]. Il nostro quartiere [Stories from Our Neighbourhood]. Feltrinelli. ISBN 9788807811807.
- Mahfouz, Naguib (1990) [1961]. Il ladro e i cani [The Thief and the Dogs]. Gruppo Editoriale L'Espresso. ISBN 9788496200678.
- Gibran, Kahlil (1991) [1920]. Le tempeste [The Tempests]. Feltrinelli. ISBN 9788807811623.
- Gibran, Kahlil (1994) [1923]. Il profeta - Il giardino del profeta [The Prophet - The Garden of the Prophet]. Bompiani. ISBN 9788858783382.
- al-Hamadani, Badi' al-Zaman (1995). Le avventure dell'Alessandrino. Marietti. ISBN 9788821178573.
- al-Wahhab, Muhammad ibn Abd (2000). L' unicità divina. Ferni Noja Noseda Foundation. ISBN 9788887281095.
- Mahfouz, Naguib (2002) [1979]. Notti delle mille e una notte [Arabian Nights and Days]. Feltrinelli. ISBN 9788807015168.
- Adonis (2005) [2002]. Memoria del vento. Guanda. ISBN 9788877467959.
- Mahfouz, Naguib (2006) [1981]. Canto di nozze [Wedding Song]. Feltrinelli. ISBN 9788807819018.
- al-Sanea, Rajaa (2008) [2005]. Ragazze di Riad [Girls of Riyadh]. Mondadori. ISBN 9788804564256.
- Ez-Eldin, Mansoura (2011) [2009]. Oltre il paradiso [Beyond Paradise]. Piemme. ISBN 9788856615487.
- al-Othman, Laila (2011) [2008]. Il messaggio segreto delle farfalle [Silence of the Butterflies]. Newton Compton. ISBN 9788854132030.
- Sobh, Alawiya (2011) [2009]. Il suo nome è passione [It's Called Passion]. Mondadori. ISBN 9788852020193.
- El Hage, Nada (2014) [2010]. Veli di passione [Veils of Passion]. Interlinea. ISBN 9788882129446.

=== Authored books ===
- L' Islam istruzioni per l'uso. Mondadori. 2009. ISBN 9788804583264.
- Vietato in nome di Allah. Lindau. 2010. ISBN 9788871808659.
