= Mohamed Elshahat =

Egyptian poet

- Born: 1954; Ad-Dahreyah, Dakahlia Governorate, Egypt.
- Died: 02/10/2024
- Years active: 1974–present
- Awards: Egypt Youth Award 1978, Naji Naaman literary Honor prizes (for complete work) 2023

The poet Mohamed Mohamed Elshahat Elraghy (also known as Mohamed Elshahat-محمد الشحات الراجحي) was born in 1954 in the village of Ad-Dahreyah in Dakahlia Governorate, Egypt. He died in Cairo on October 2, 2024. He graduated from the Faculty of Arts, Department of Arabic Language at Cairo University. His first collection of poems, Circling Around the Empty Head, was published in 1974 and won several awards, including the Egypt Youth Poetry Award in 1978. He was awarded Naji Naaman's literary honor prize for his complete works in 2023. Elshahat worked as a journalist in many newspapers and literary magazines in Egypt and the Arab world. He finally settled at Al-Akhbar Publishing House and worked as deputy editor-in-chief of Akhbar Al-Riyadah newspaper. Elshahat was also one of the founders of the Egyptian magazine "Masriyah " which was published in Egypt in the early 1970s. He is a member of the Egyptian Syndicate of Journalists, the Union of Writers, and the Board of Trustees of the Mustafa and Ali Amin Association (Laylat Al-Qadar). Elshahat also served as a member of the board of directors of the Union of Writers in 2015.

== Career ==
Elshahat is considered to be the first/only Egyptian poet to write a complete collection of poems about the 25 January Revolution and 3 July Coup D'état. He has also been the subject of more than 200 critical studies in four books, including "Critical Mirrors: The Poetic Experience of Mohamed Elshahat" which includes 46 critical studies (Dar El-Adham, 2020) Mohamed Elshahat's poetry has also been studied in a Master's Thesis by researcher Haneen Al-Fallah, which was published in a book by Jordanian Dar Giada, and a PhD thesis by Dr. Tarek Mohamed Abdel-Meguid. Elshahat has appeared in several television interviews, including "The Pen and the Quill","Words” and "My Story with the Place".

== Works ==
Mohamed Elshahat's poetry has been covered and published in many Egyptian and Arab newspapers, magazines, and literary journals. He published more than 20 collections of poetry during his career. His complete works were published over two parts by Dar Waad and AAUG Press.

- Circling Around the Empty Head Dar El-Horreya (1974)
- The last of what memory holds Al-Arabi Publishing and Distribution (1979)
- When you enter my blood – Arabic creativity series Egyptian General Authority for Books (1982)
- Variations on the Wall of Time Egyptian General Authority for Books (1984)
- Revelation Egyptian General Authority for Books (1986)
- My never ending defeats General Authority for Culture Palaces (1990)
- The Metro won't stop at Tahrir square Egyptian General Authority for Books (2012)
- Let me in slowly (Dar Waad for Publishing and Distribution, 2013)
- Diary of the June 30 Revolution Dar Waad for Publishing and Distribution (2013)
- When my pain broke me Dar Waad for Publishing and Distribution (2014)
- Crying in the hands of the granddaughter Dar Waad for Publishing and Distribution (2014)
- Life without a face Dar Waad for Publishing and Distribution (2016)
- Letters of the homeland Dar Waad for Publishing and Distribution (2017)
- Attempts whose ends I do not know Egyptian General Authority for Books (2018)
- He writes in his notebook Dar El-Adham (2018)
- A poet's farewell songs Dar Al-Adeeb (2019)
- He will return from a faraway country Dar El-Adham (2019)
- Trembling of the maqamat Dar El-Adham (2020)
- When will it end Dar El-Adham (2020)
- A man overtaken by being blue Dar El-Adham (2021)
- The features of my shadow Egyptian General Authority for Books (2021)
- He couldn't choose Egyptian Ministry of Culture (2023)

In addition to these collections, Mohamed Elshahat has a selection of poetry in press at the Algerian House of Words.

Finally, Mohamed Elshahat contributed to the preparation of a memorial book about Naguib Mahfouz immediately after he received the 1988 Nobel Prize in Literature, published by the Egyptian Ministry of Culture. He also participated in editing the Encyclopedia of Women Through History, published by the Egyptian Ministry of Culture, and was the editor-in-chief of the Arab Music magazine, which was published by the Egyptian Opera House for the Arab Music Festival. Mohamed Elshahat was the editor-in-chief of the Reading for Everyone magazine, which was published by the Book House and then the Egyptian Authority for Culture Palaces, and was the editor-in-chief of the Book newspaper, published by the Book Authority in conjunction with the Cairo International Book Fair from 1984 to 2011.
