= Al-Tariq =

Al-Tariq or Al Tariq (Arabic: الطريق) may refer to:

- At-Tariq, 86th chapter of the Quran
- The Search (novel), 1964 novel by Naguib Mahfouz
- Al Tariq (magazine), Lebanese magazine in the 1940s
- Al' Tariq (born 1970), American rapper and former member of The Beatnuts
- Al-Tariq, a fictional character in Marvel Comics, see List of comic book supervillain debuts

== See also ==
- Tariq
