= Under the Umbrella =

Under the Umbrella (Arabic: تحت المظلة, romanized: Taht al-Mazalla) is a collection of short stories by the Egyptian Nobel laureate in Literature, Naguib Mahfouz, first published in 1967. In one of its stories, he narrates his experience visiting Yemen in July 1963.

== About the book ==
The book consists of a collection of 6 stories varying in length from short stories to novellas, alongside 5 short plays. The short stories in the book include titles such as:

- Under the Umbrella (Arabic: تحت المظلة, romanized: Taht al-Mazalla)
- Sleep (Arabic: النوم, romanized: Al-Noum)
- Darkness (Arabic: الظلام, romanized: Al-Zulma)
- The Other Face (Arabic: الوجه الآخر, romanized: Al-Wajh Al-Akhar)
- The Magician Stole the Dish (Arabic: الحاوي خطف الطبق, romanized: Al-Hawi Khataf Al-Tabaq)
- Three Days in Yemen (Arabic: ثلاثة أيام في اليمن, romanized: Thalatha Ayam fi Al-Yemen)
