= Maraya (disambiguation) =

Maraya is a Syrian television series.

Maraya may also refer to

- Maraya (building), a concert hall in Saudi Arabia
- Dan Maraya (1946–2015), a Nigerian griot
- Mirrors (novel), 1972 novel by Naguib Mahfouz

== See also ==
- Maraaya, a Slovenian duo of musicians
