= Midaq Alley =

Midaq Alley may refer to:

- Midaq Alley (novel), 1947 Egyptian novel by Naguib Mahfouz
- Midaq Alley (film), 1995 Mexican film adaptation of the novel
