= Trevor LeGassick =

American Arabist and translator (1934 – 2022)

- Born: August 19, 1935
- Died: June 21, 2022 (aged 86)

Academic background
- Education: School of Oriental and African Studies

Academic work
- Institutions: University of Michigan

Trevor LeGassick (August 19, 1935 – June 21, 2022) was a noted Western scholar and translator in the field of Arabic literature. He obtained a BA in Arabic from the School of Oriental and African Studies in 1958 and completed a PhD, also from SOAS, in 1960. After stints in Wisconsin and Indiana, he joined the faculty of the University of Michigan in 1966, where he would teach for fifty-two years. He was promoted to full professor in 1979.

LeGassick published three books and numerous articles on contemporary Arabic culture and literature. He was also noted as a translator of Arabic novels, short stories and plays, covering a wide range of modern writers such as Naguib Mahfouz, Halim Barakat, Yusuf Idris and Emile Habiby. His 1975 translation of Mahfouz's novel Midaq Alley was one of the first works to introduce English speakers to the writings of the eventual Nobel Prize winner.

He retired as emeritus professor at the University of Michigan on May 31, 2022, and died on June 21, 2022.

== Books ==
- Major Themes in Modern Arabic Thoughts (1979)
- The Defense Statement of Ahmad 'Urabi(1982)
- Critical Perspectives on Naguib Mahfouz (1990)

== Selected translations ==
- Midaq Alley by Naguib Mahfouz. 1975
- Days of Dust by Halim Barakat. 1974
- Flipflop and His Master by Yusuf Idris. A three-act play in translation, 1977
- I Am Free and Other Stories by Ihsan Abd El Koddous. 1978.
- The Secret Life of Saeed (A Palestinian Who Became a Citizen of Israel) by Emile Habiby. Co-translator: Salma Khadra Jayyusi. 1982
- The Thief and the Dogs by Naguib Mahfouz. Co-translator: M. Badawi. 1984
- Wild Thorns by Sahar Khalifeh. Co-translator: Elizabeth Fernea. 1985
