= Whisper of Madness =

Short story collection

Whisper of Madness (Hams Al-Junun) is Naguib Maḥfouz’s first short story collection. It consists of short stories taking place in Cairo, following the scandals of Cairo's elite and its underbelly, with nationalism persisting throughout the collection. The stories were first published separately in newspapers and magazines in the 1930s. The short story The Price of Weakness (Thaman Al-Duʿf) is considered to be Maḥfouz’s first short story, and it was published in August 1934. Maḥfouz clears some misconceptions about the collection by saying “readers might not be aware that Whisper of Madness (Hams Al-Junun) was not published in 1938, as is stated in my bibliography, but actually after the publication of my novel ‘Midaq Alley’’.

== Stories in The Collection ==
Whisper of Madness (Hams Al-Junun), Falsehood (Al-Zayf), Betrayal in Letters (Khiyana Fi Rasa’il), From The Diaries of a Young Man (Min Muḏakarāt Shāb), Delirium (Al-Haḏayān), The Mummy Awakens (Yaqaẓat Al-Mumya'), Women’s Snares (Kaydihin), Gardens of Relief (Ruwaḍ Al-Faraj), This Century (Haḏa Al-Qarn), Hunger (Al-Juuʿ), The Prisoner’s Suit (Bathlatul Aseer), We Are Men (Naḥnu Rijālun), The Worshipped Human (Al-Basharul Maʿbud), The Deadly Paper (Al-Waraqatul Muhlika), The Price of Happiness (Thamanul Saʿāda), An Hour’s Dream (Ḥilmu Saʿatin), The Price (Al-Thaman), Renege on Motherhood (Nakthul Umuma), A Life for Others (Ḥayatun Lil Ghayr), Crossroads (Muftaraqal Ṭuruq), Reformation of Graves (Iṣlaḥul Qubur), The Exchanged Malady (Al-Maraḍul Mutabādal), A Clown’s Life (Ḥayatul Muharej), Aristocratic Futility (ʿAbathun Arisuqraṭiyun), A Doctor’s Illness (Maraḍu Ṭabiben), Pepper (Filfil), An Unfamiliar Sound (Ṣawtun Min Al- ʿ Ālam Al- Ākhar).
