= 1988 Nobel Prize in Literature =

- Naguib Mahfouz
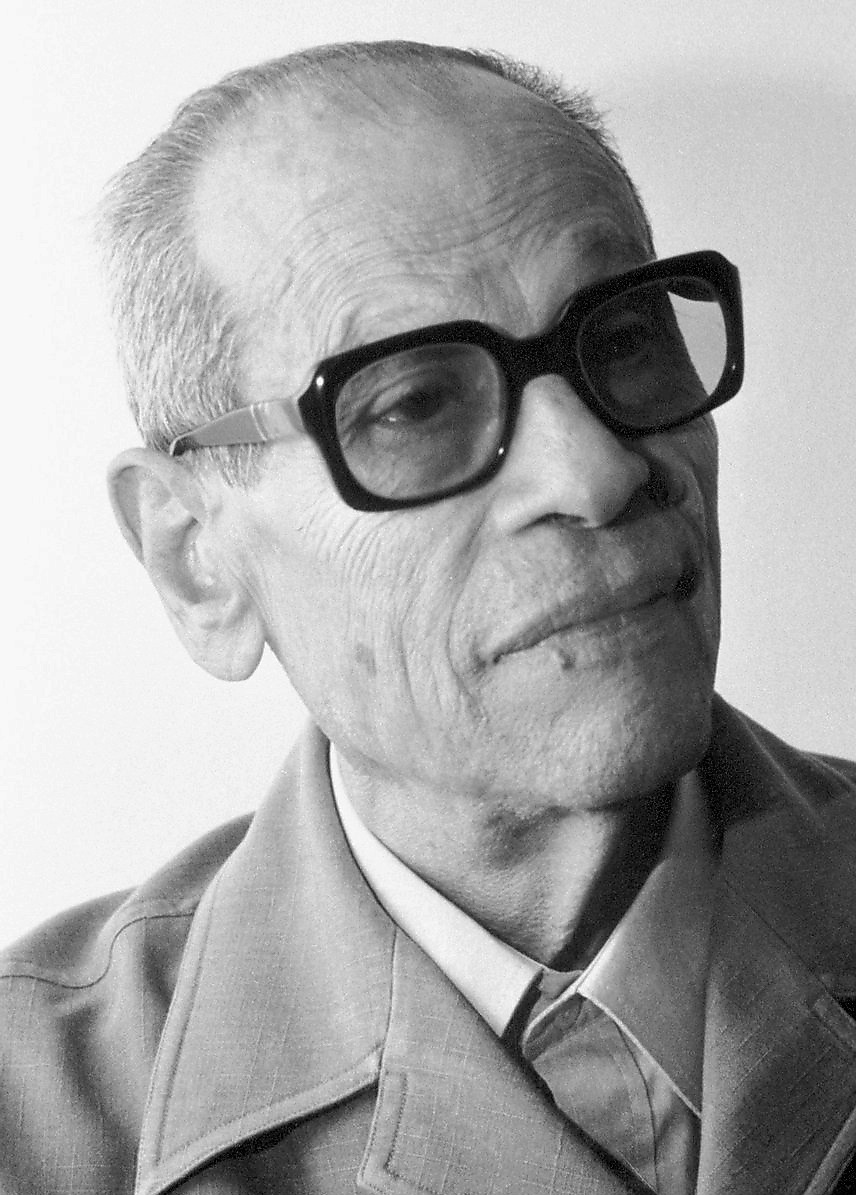
- "who, through works rich in nuance – now clear-sightedly realistic, now evocatively ambiguous – has formed an Arabian narrative art that applies to all mankind."
- Date: 13 October 1988 (announcement); 10 December 1988 (ceremony)
- Location: Stockholm, Sweden
- Presented by: Swedish Academy
- First award: 1901
- Website: Official website

The 1988 Nobel Prize in Literature was awarded to the Egyptian writer Naguib Mahfouz (1911–2006) "who, through works rich in nuance – now clear-sightedly realistic, now evocatively ambiguous – has formed an Arabian narrative art that applies to all mankind." He is the first and only Arabic–Egyptian recipient of the prize.

== Laureate ==
The writings of Naguib Mahfouz address some of life's most important issues, such as the passage of time, society and norms, knowledge and faith, reason and love. Some of his early works are set in ancient Egypt such as Rādūbīs ("Rhadopis of Nubia", 1943), and he frequently uses Cairo as the setting for his tales. His famous Al-Thulāthiyyah ("The Trilogy", 1956–57): Bayn al-qaṣrayn ("Palace Walk", 1956), Qaṣr al-shawq ("Palace of Desire", 1957), and Al-Sukkariyyah ("Sugar Street", 1957), describes prolifically modern Egyptian society. Though some of his later works have a more mystical or metaphysical quality, later works of his focused on the modern age and life in a changing society. 350 short stories and more than 30 novels make up Mahfouz's body of work, among them Awlād ḥāratinā ("Children of Gebelawi", 1959), Tharthara Fawq Al-Nīl ("Adrift on the Nile", 1966), and Afrāḥ al-qubba ("Wedding Song", 1981). Many of his stories have been adapted for film.

== Candidates ==
It is known that the Chinese author Shen Congwen was considered for the 1988 Nobel literature prize, but he died during the Swedish Academy's deliberations that year.

== Reactions ==
Widely read in Egypt and other Arabic countries, Mahfouz was largely unknown in the Western world at the time he was awarded the Nobel prize. While Mahfouz was controversial politically, he was a popular writer and the Nobel prize to him was well received throughout the Arab world. Edward Said, professor of English and comparative literature at Columbia University, said Mahfouz is "certainly the greatest of the living Arab novelists and one of the greatest living writers. I only find it surprising it took this long. It's a sign of antagonism between the Western and Arab worlds he didn't win before. He's certainly on a level with Balzac, Thomas Mann and Joyce."

The Nobel prize medal and diploma was accepted by his two daughters at the award ceremony in Stockholm in December 1988. Mahfouz donated most of the prize money to charities.

== Nobel lecture ==
Naguib Mahfohz's Nobel lecture was read at the Swedish Academy on 8 December 1988 by Mohamed Salmawy, first in Arabic, then in English.

== Award ceremony ==
At the award ceremony in Stockholm on 10 December 1988, Sture Allén, permanent secretary of the Swedish Academy, said:

Naguib Mahfouz has an unrivalled position as spokesman for Arabic prose. Through him, in the cultural sphere to which he belongs, the art of the novel and the short story has attained international standards of excellence, the result of a synthesis of classical Arabic tradition, European inspiration and personal artistry.

Naguib Mahfouz was unable to the attend the award ceremony. The prize was accepted by his daughters, Om Kalsoum Naguib Mahfouz and Fatma Naguib Mahfouz.
