= The Search (novel) =

1964 novel by Naguib Mahfouz

- Author: Naguib Mahfouz
- Original title: الطريق
- Translator: Mohamed Islam
- Language: Arabic
- Genre: Novel
- Publisher: Doubleday
- Publication date: 1964 (translation 1987 & 1991)
- Publication place: Egypt
- Media type: Print (Hardback)

The Search is a novel written and published by Nobel Prize-winning author Naguib Mahfouz in 1964. It was translated from Arabic into English in 1987 by Mohamed Islam, edited by Magdi Wahba, and published by Doubleday in 1991.

== Symbolism and comparison with other works ==
The original Arabic title is الطريق which means "the way" or "the quest" and is very close to the word used by Muslim sufists [called Sufist Ways الطرق الصوفية] for the different "ways" or "schools" by which to approach God. The name of the hero's father in the novel "Sayed Sayed Al-Rehaimi" is reminiscent of an omnipotent supreme being, the name in Arabic means literally "Master Master the Compassionate", his last name being very close to al-Rahim, one of the 99 names of God in the Quran. Saber's search for him seems to be a thinly disguised search for God or Meaning. This theme of search for meaning or way of existence is comparable to other novels by Mahfouz, notably Children of Gebelawi (1959), The Beggar (1965), Heart of the Night (1975) and The Harafish (1977).

== Release details ==
- 1987, Egypt, American University of Cairo Press ISBN 977-424-160-6, Pub date ? ? 1987, paperback (in translation)
- 1991, US, Anchor Books ISBN 0-385-26460-7, Pub date ? May 1991, paperback (in translation)
- 1991, US, Doubleday ISBN 0-385-26459-3, Pub date June 1, 1991, hardcover (in translation)
