= A Story Without a Beginning or an Ending =

1971 book by Naguib Mahfouz

- Author: Naguib Mahfouz
- Language: Arabic
- Genre: Short Story Collection
- Published: 1971
- Publisher: Dar El-Shorouk Publishing
- Publication place: Cairo, Egypt
- Pages: 252

A Story Without a Beginning or an Ending (Ḥikaya Bila Bidaya Wala Nihaya) is the 1971 short story collection by Naguib Mahfouz. The collection consists of five stories, and the one thing they have in common is their lack of clear beginning or ending. This collection is one of Mahfouz's complex philosophical works, where he navigates existentialist topics. Mahfouz's focusing on philosophy does not take away from the realism of the plot and characters, for the characters are so realistic that they blur the line between fiction and reality. The collection navigates several topics, including religion, science, life, faith, nationalism, and liberation. The collection was adapted into a TV series in 1997 directed by Ahmad Khudr, and starring many popular actors, including Nabil Al-Hilfawy, Athar Al-Hakin, and Suhair Al-Murshidi. Despite the diverse topics this collection includes, the two main topics remain (science) and (socialism), which also form the foundations of Mahfouz's other works, for he stated that they make up the two poles of his bibliography.

== Stories in The Collection ==
The collection consists of five stories:

1. Ḥikaya Bila Bidaya Wala Nihaya (A Story Without a Beginning or an Ending): This story presents the conflict between religion and science, and the latter's revolt on the former before attempting to find a middle ground between the too. Mahfouz presents this conflict as eternal; therefore, not including a real ending or solution to it.
2. Ḥarat Al-ʿUshaq (The Lover's District): This symbolic story presents humanity's conflict with faith, and the fragility of the relationship between the two. The characters in the story embody concepts and ideas. For example, the protagonist (Abdullah) - literally meaning God's worshipper – presents humans, and his wife is “Eman” or “Faith,” symbolizing religious faith. The two characters’ conflict leads to their parting, representing humans’ drifting away from their faith.
3. Rubabika: A story showcasing humanity's unity in suffering despite having different experiences and circumstances.
4. Ar-Rajul Allathi Faqada Ḏakiratuhu Marratayn (The Man Who Lost His Memory Twice): A cynical story presenting the nationalism's futility and the fake hope it lends its people before the victory of regression and stagnancy.
5. ʿAnbar Lulu (Amber Lulu): A story about the conflict between imagination and reality, regression and progression, holding onto traditional values and liberation. It also shows how humans reserve to imagination during hard times.

== Criticism ==
A Story Without a Beginning or an Ending (Ḥikaya Bila Bidaya Wala Nihaya) is one of Mahfouz's most controversial works. In fact, the TV series adaptation's screenplay writer said that no one dared adapt the novel into any form of visual or auditory media, and it is Mahfouz's only work to not get adapted due to the controversial topics it covers. Especially since Mahfouz touches upon Sufism and metaphysical ideas in the collection. The novel covers social and political situations preceding the July 1952 revolution.
