= The Crime (Mahfouz book) =

1973 collection by Naguib Mahfouz

Al-jarima (الجريمة "The Crime") is a 1973 collection of eight short stories and a short play by Naguib Mahfouz. The collection contains both crime and absurdist stories.

== Contents ==
- The Pursuit (A One-Act Play)
- Investigation
- Room No. 12
- The Drums
- The Groom
- Nakedness and Rage
- The Crime
- The High-Level Interview
- Welcome
