= The Coffeehouse =

1988 novel by Naguib Mahfouz

- Author: Naguib Mahfouz
- Language: Arabic
- Genre: Novel
- Publisher: Dar Shorouq publications
- Publication date: 1988
- Publication place: Egypt
- Pages: 154

The Coffeehouse (1988) is a novel by Nobel-winning Egyptian writer Naguib Mahfouz; it was his last novel, although it was not his final work. The novel narrates the story of a group of friends in Al-Abasiya, who during their childhood united after coming from different directions, west and the east, in a playground, becoming life-long friends who took the coffeehouse as their main spot to talk about life.

The conversations throughout the novel touch upon cultural and religious aspects, aiming to depict life in Egypt in the old times from the author’s perspective, along with societal aspects and war happening nearby or among them, such as Palestine war, the death of Ahmed Maher, war between Ibrahim AbdulHadi and the society of “The Muslim Brotherhood”, Cairo fire, and the British conquest.

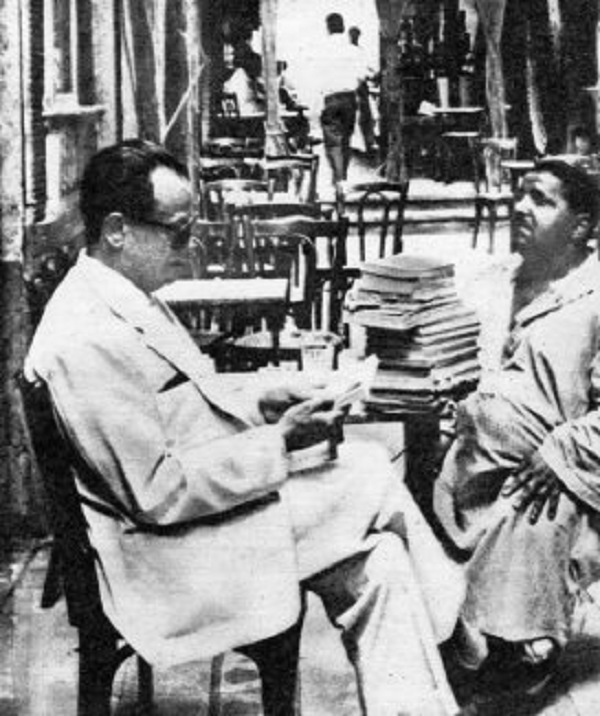
Naguib Mahfouz in café

In addition, the novel sheds light on the cultural and religious differences between this group of friends and their families.

== Characters ==
- Ismael Qudrah Suleiman: He lives in Hasan Eid’s street. He was very smart; disappointing to his teachers and parents. He loves religion, God; he prays and started fasting at seven years old. He studied literature, and later was hired in a writing job at a publisher.
- Tahir Obaid: He lived in a villa. He is comical, simple, loved poetry, and his facial expressions indicated he was from the low-class. He is not religious; as he was not raised to be one. He seemed to be from the pagan origins, or abstractly just not religious. Later on he marries Raafeya, and she gives birth to a daughter named Doraya.
- Hamada: He lived near the hospital square. He studies law later on.
- Sadeq Safwan: He lived between all these locations. He polite and religious. He would pray, look forward to fast as soon as became 7 years old, and he did not have siblings. His life eventually changed after meeting Raafat Basha al Zain, whom he considered of significance to him. He later left his education, and founded a copper factory. He finds love, yet he encounters marriage problems later on. He eventually has two children; Ibrahim and Sabri after first being married to Ehsan.

== Plot summary ==
The coffeehouse was the group of friends’ regular, “special” spot where they spoke about life, touching upon all topics from their daily lives and routine spent with their family, such as going to the cinema and planting, to their moments at school and what each of them pursued after graduating, Sadeq founded a copper factory, Tariq became a poet, Hamada pursuing law, and their love life, marriages, and the questions of love and death.

The coffeehouse was considered “haram” to the friends’ parents because of topics discussed, trying out new stuff to them such as smoking hookah and drinking, and telling each other the adventures of how love from the first sight felt like from dopamine rushes, nervousness, and failures.

Political arguments would arise throughout the times of British conquest, wars, and political issues overall, causing protests. Teaching civics was a huge risk at that time despite that it was still done due to the fact that it revealed so much, causing attachment to the homeland. Religious differences would appear, “It is not just Islam, Christianity, and Judaism, we have here. It is also AlWafd”, as one of the friends would say.

Cultural conflicts would separate between Tahir and his family, as he’d say that “parents need a new way to raise children”. He fought with his parents because they wanted him to be a doctor, but he failed with that. He only succeeded with writing poems in a magazine. His parents considered him as a failure, to the point of refusing him to marry a nurse, who they thought was going to be of a bad reputation that he, with a "bad reputation", is married to a lady with a "good reputation". so he cut contact with them, and managed to marry her in their 20s.

The coffeehouse lives with them throughout all their moments; successful love, failed love, newborn children, the death of their parents. new career changes; Taher was invited to join in creating music for movies, and Hamada pursued law through work from home. In light of life changes, and finding partners, questions would arise about the philosophy of pure love and how it can be real, maintaining a lifetime of happiness.

The same life is inherited by the new generations. Sadeq’s children are religious like him, and he wanted Sabri to take over his trading business after he died. Ibrahim wanted to marry Doraya, Tariq’s daughter.

The novel ends with the group celebrating the 70 years of friendship which seemed like a minute ago. Ismaeel thought deeply about music once played by the Rubab instrument, until Sadeq recited Surah Ad-Duhaa from the Qur'an, waking him up from his thoughts.

== Quotes ==
“The page of history is turned holding beneath it all what it contains, and the love remains new forever”

“We all accept death with our tongues, but it throws our heart into a place in an ultimate time”

== Related Links ==
Naguib Mahfouz

Naguib Mahfouz Medal for Literature

Cairo Trilogy
