= Autumn Quail =

Novel by Naguib Mahfouz

- Author: Naguib Mahfouz
- Language: Arabic/English (Translation)
- Genre: Fictional Novel
- Published: 1962

Autumn Quail is a novel by the Egyptian writer Naguib Mahfouz. It is considered to be one of his more philosophical works. The novel looks at foreignness, the past, and the everchanging reality through the character Isa Al-Dabbagh. This novel was originally published in 1962 and was later adapted into a foreign language film in 1967. The film was directed by Hussam Addein Mustafa. The novel was then translated into English in 1985 under the title Autumn Quail.

== Summary ==
The novel opens with burning and looting in Cairo, historically known as Black Saturday. The main character, Isa, is a senior civil servant and a member of the Wafd party. After being close to getting promoted to a higher position and marrying Salwa, the daughter of a Pasha, a political and violent revolution ignites and changes his life; he gets pensioned off and his engagement gets broken off, leaving him isolated and in turmoil. He goes to Alexandria where he meets the prostitute Riri, who lives with him before he kicks her out upon finding out that she is pregnant. Then, he marries a rich infertile divorcee. Throughout the novel, he suffers from boredom and depression, and he finds solace in gambling. After a while, he runs into Riri and with her a young girl, his daughter. In the end, he sits in the dark next to Saad Zaghloul's statue before a strong young man holding a flower comes to talk to him and leaves. Isa follows the footsteps of the young man leaving behind him his loneliness and darkness.

== Criticism ==
The hero is "in a state of personal alienation and conflict between what is happening and what has happened to him in the past". The scholar Mahmoud Amin compares this novel and Mahfouz's previous novel The Thief and The Dogs, saying that the latter represents the consciousness of a rebel attempting to change a rigid reality, whereas Autumn Quail represents a changing reality clashing with a rigid consciousness. He also thinks that the novel published after Autumn Quail, The Search, is a continuation of and elaboration on some of the aspects of Autumn Quail. Additionally, he states that the title of the novel refers to the materialistic and moral immigration of the protagonist in his attempt at finding warmth.
