= Akhenaten, Dweller in Truth =

1985 novel by Naguib Mahfouz

- 1985 Arabic edition
- Author: Naguib Mahfouz
- Original title: العائش فى الحقيقة
- Translator: Tagreid Abu-Hassabo
- Cover artist: Eric Fuentecilla
- Language: Arabic
- Genre: Historical Novel
- Publisher: Columbia University Press (hb) & Bantam Doubleday Dell (pb) (both translations)
- Publication date: 1985 (translation 1998)
- Publication place: Egypt
- Media type: Print (hardback & paperback)
- Pages: 180 p. (hardback edition) & 168 p. (paperback edition)
- ISBN: 977-424-470-2
- OCLC: 47900047

Akhenaten, Dweller in Truth is a novel written and published by Nobel Prize-winning Egyptian author Naguib Mahfouz in 1985. It was translated from Arabic into English in 1998 by Tagreid Abu-Hassabo.

The form and subject of the book is the basis for a cello concerto of the same title by Mohammed Fairouz.

== Plot summary ==
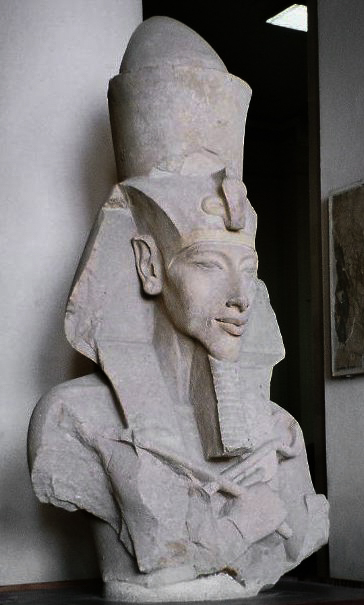
Pharaoh Akhenaten

On the way from Sais to Panopolis with his father, the scribe Meriamun points out the ruins of Amarna, the city that the "heretic pharaoh" Akhenaten built for his One and Only God. Seeking a balanced perspective on the events of that time, which split Egypt politically and religiously, Meriamun gets a letter of introduction from his father to many members of Akhenaten's court, among them the High Priest of Amun, his chief of security Haremhab, and his queen Nefertiti. Each tale adds a new dimension to the enigma that is Akhenaten and the thoughts of those that were close to him allow Meriamun – and the reader – to judge for themselves whether Akhenaten was a power politician or a true believer.

== Characters ==
- The High Priest of Amun
- Ay, Akhenaten's teacher and counselor
- Haremhab, chief of security
- Bek, sculptor
- Tadukhipa, daughter of Tushratta, concubine of Amenhotep III
- Toto, chief epistoler
- Tey, Ay's wife
- Mutnedjmet, Ay's second daughter and Nefertiti's sister.
- Meri-Ra, High Priest of the One and Only God
- Mae, commander of the armed forces
- Maho, chief of police
- Nakht, minister of Akhenaten's chamber
- Bento, Akhenaten's personal physician
- Nefertiti, Ay's first daughter and Akhenaten's wife
