= The Journey of Ibn Fattouma =

Book by Naguib Mahfouz

- 1983 Arabic edition
- Author: Naguib Mahfouz
- Original title: رحلة ابن فطومة
- Translator: Denys Johnson-Davies
- Language: Arabic
- Genre: Novel
- Publisher: Doubleday
- Publication date: 1983 (translation 1992)
- Publication place: Egypt
- Media type: Print (Hardback)
- ISBN: 0-385-42323-3 (hardback edition)
- OCLC: 24380570
- Dewey Decimal: 892/.736 20
- LC Class: PJ7846.A46 R513 1992

The Journey of Ibn Fattouma (Arabic:رحلة ابن فطومة) is a fable written and published by Nobel Prize-winning author Naguib Mahfouz in 1983. It was translated from Arabic into English in 1992 by Denys Johnson-Davies and published by Doubleday.

== Plot summary ==
Ibn Fattouma, more commonly known by his birth name Qindil Muhammad al-Innabi, is a Muslim man disillusioned by the corruption in his home city. When he asks his teacher why a land whose people obey the tenets of Islam suffers so, Qindil is told that the answer he seeks lies far away from the city, in the land of Gebel; the land of perfection. The teacher encourages Ibn Fattouma to seek the land of Gebel, where such problems have been solved. The teacher attempted to journey there himself, but civil war in neighboring lands and the demands of family ultimately prevented him from completing the journey. Further complicating Qindil's impending expedition, no documents exist about the land and no one is known to have returned from Gebel.

Qindil is determined to embark on the journey, for he feels betrayed by his mother, who remarried, and his lover, who was stolen by the sultan. He gives his farewells to his family and proceeds on a caravan out of his home city to the land of Mashriq. In this sexually libertine society, the women and men do not marry; rather, they share each other's partners. The religion of Mashriq is primitive and pagan; the moon is worshiped as a god. Qindil questions the land's customs, but he soon acculturates to their ways. He settles in Mashriq with a woman named Arousa and they have five children. Because of Qindil's insistence upon teaching his eldest son Islam, he is exiled from Mashriq and prohibited from seeing Arousa or their children again.

Qindil then travels to the land of Haïra. The invasion of Mashriq by militaristic Haïra further separates Qindil from his family, and when the annexation of Mashriq is finished, Arousa is brought to Haïra as a slave, who is then bought by Qindil. The chamberlain of the god-king of Haïra desires Arousa as a wife and arranges Qindil to be jailed. Twenty years pass in Haïra in jail before the god-king is overthrown, and the chamberlain, who is also later jailed, tells Qindil to look in the neighboring land of Halba for Arousa and children. In Halba, the freedom of the individual is the most important value. All religions peacefully coexist and Halba openly encourages freedom of inquiry. The Halbans are also aggressive promoters of their philosophy of life in other nations; preparations are underway as Qindil arrives for a war with neighboring Aman. There, Qindil meets and marries Samia, an intellectual Muslim pediatrician in Halba's hospital. Qindil reunites with Arousa, who thought he was lost and had since married a Buddhist man. With Samia's reluctant approval, Qindil decides to continue his journey before war makes such travel impossible.

In the land of Aman, justice is held as the most important value. To maintain order, he leaves just as Aman and Halba prepare to fight. His next stop, the land of Ghuroub, finds Qindil questioned to the depths of his being. Does he earnestly desire to go to Gebel, and why? Qindil states as he has many times before that he seeks to learn Gebel's secret of perfection in life and share it with the people of his homeland. He and the other seekers of Gebel are driven from Ghuroub by an invading army from Aman, and after months of travel, they sight Gebel itself from a mountain peak. As Qindil descends to continue his journey, the story ends leaving the reader to surmise whether or not he reached the city.

== Setting ==
The setting of the story is not clearly spatial or temporal; the journey moves through a space that can represent the historical Middle East, an analogical space of different periods of history or a simply imaginary space. It can be viewed as some combination of these spaces.

The story may be allegorical for the rise of Human Civilization. Qindil starts his adventure from his homeland, the Dar al-Islam, which practices traditional, familiar Islamic values but imperfectly, and with a great deal of corruption. When Qindil sets out, the first land he visits is the Land of Mashriq. Mashriq is the land of the sunrise, and may represent early civilization; particularly that of pre-Islamic Arabia. Mashriq employs a very basic religion based on worship of the moon, and incorporates primal, tribal, values representative of early human development.

Haira may thus represent the rise of human civilization and the chaos that accompanied it. Haira means “confusion” in Arabic and features the rule of a divine king and frequent wars. Its values seem to reflect those of absolutism; though without any clear historical period in mind. Qindil travels to the Halba following Haira, Halba is the land of freedom. Halba may represent Western civilization, and includes democracy, wealth, and sophistication. Halba eventually conquers both Mashriq and Haira; plausibly mirroring the historical rise of the West.

Qindil then travels to Aman; the land of security and total justice. Aman employs communism and is engaged with a struggle for influence against Halba; an interesting parallel to the time the book was written in 1983. Finally Qindil stops at Ghuroub; the land of the sunset. Ghuroub is interesting, as it has no obvious parallel in the real world. It is a transitory place, where people train to go forth to the land of Gebel. Qindil then journeys to the Land of Gebel, which is at the top of a mountain. Gebel symbolizes heaven on Earth. No man has ever returned from Gebel, the land of perfect society.

Some of the places mentioned in the book, such as Gebel, Haira and Mashriq were names of historical kingdoms in the Classical and Medieval Middle East. They are not just analogies but also references to the real, if much mythologised past.

== Analysis ==
Mahfouz turned away from Western literature and looked to Arabic modes for narrative inspiration. Medieval Arabic influence was shown in the story's episodic style with little interest in a central plot. Mahfouz used the Journey of Ibn Battuta as an inspiration but his character, Ibn Fattouma travels through time, not space. Each land fits into the evolution of civilization. The Journey is an allegory for Mahfouz's search for a perfect socio-political system. Each land was named after its time in the history of man; Mashriq was sunrise, Haira bewilderment, Halba arena, Aman security, Ghuroub sunset, and Gebel mountain. This story ends in the present as it is fitting that it does not continue into the future. Mahfouz shows the progression of man from undeveloped to modern, developed civilizations.

The land of Mashriq (or Sunrise in the original text) represents the origin of human society. A tribal land, it has an animist religion and the people live comparatively simply to Qindil's homeland. Next in the progression is the land of Haira (or Bewilderment), a land representing the transition to absolute monarchies in the course of human civilization. Haira incites a war against Mashriq, triumphs and promptly takes over it, showing the spread of monarchy as well as the spread of these empires. Next is Halba (or Arena), a land of freedom, where all religions are tolerated and freedom of speech is guaranteed and practiced. However, it is plagued by crime. The democracy engages in war against Halba, succeeds, and takes over Haira, like the revolutions and change to democracy in much of the world in the 18th to 20th centuries. Next is Aman (or Security), a communist society in which equality is enforced and the government controls all aspects of society. The president, however, has absolute power and has a distinct social and monetary advantage over the commoners. A parallel in the world would be the Soviet Union. The land engages in a war with Halba and takes over Ghuroub out of fear of Halba taking it, much like the influence America and the Soviet Union had over other countries in the Cold War of recent times. The victor is left ambiguous, just as the victor of the Cold War was unknown in 1983, when the novel was written. Last is the land of Gebel (or Mountain); a utopia. It represents the climax of human society and the workings of the society are left unknown, just as the workings of a utopia today are unknown to humanity.

== Characters ==
- Qindil Muhammad al-Innabi - The narrator and the main protagonist, he is the son of an eighty-year-old man, Muhammad al-Innabi, who fell in love with a seventeen-year-old girl, Fattouma al-Azhari. He was given the name 'Ibn Fattouma' i.e. 'son of Fattouma'.
- Arousa - The girl that Qindil falls in love with in the Land of Mashriq but the ways of the land are different and he can't marry (or purchase) her outright. But a union, of sorts, is established and Qindil settles down in the land, staying for years and fathering her children. Driven to bring his son up on the principles of Islam, he runs afoul of local customs and is arrested and deported. They are united momentarily after Mashriq is conquered are separated when Qindil is falsely arrested. Arousa then marries a Buddhist and sees Qindil in the Land of Halba in a jewelry shop that Qindil is working in.
- Ham - Qindil's mentor throughout the land of Haira, he is the owner of the inn for foreign travelers.
- Fam - Qindil's mentor throughout the land of Mashriq, he is the owner of the inn for foreign travelers.
- Halima Adlial-Tantawi - She is a young woman in Qindil's homeland whom he spots walking throughout the streets with her father who is blind. Immediately, Qindil starts to admire her and decides to ask for her hand in marriage. Qindil's mother is reluctant at first, due to the fact that Halima originates from a family that is of a lesser class and states that Qindil is too young and can marry any other woman but Qindil is insistent.
- Fattouma al-Azhari - When only seventeen, Fattouma al-Azhari married her husband of eighty years old. Qindil is given the name 'Ibn Fattouma' which means 'son of Fattouma' by his brothers as a means of "washing their hands of any possible relationship with them and casting doubts upon my mother."
- Muhammad al-Innabi - Qindil's father, who is eighty when he falls in love with Fattouma al-Azhari, Qindil's mother and had produced seven notable merchant sons before him.
- Samia - Qindil falls in love with her in the land of Halba. Qindil's relationships with Arousa and Samia over the course of his travels provide him with deep happiness and satisfaction. His greatest sorrows are in losing his two loves.
- Sheik Maghagha al-Gibeili - Qindil's teacher who made a journey himself but had to stop before he could visit the land of Gebel due to a war. He marries Qindil's mother as he "cannot bear his solitude any longer" at the same time as Qindil's marriage to Halima is arranged. He is the tutor who extols the virtues of travel as a way of finding the true meaning of life.
- Sheikh Hamada al Sabki - Qindil meets him in the land of Halba. He gives the call to prayer in the streets and tells Qindil that in the land of Halba, people preached that Islam encouraged homosexuality. Qindil is taken aback by this news and is disappointed by the New Islam that was manifesting itself in this country. Imam invites Qindil to his house and there, he introduces his daughter, Samia, to him.
- The Sage in the Land of Ghuroub - He is an Old man located in the forest. He is the instructor of those who are perplexed, and prepares those who desire to make the journey to the Land of Gebel.

== Theme ==
Throughout his ensuing journey, Ibn Fattouma undergoes many struggles both on an existential and intellectual level as he attempts to determine the meaning of life in relation to who he is. Themes present in Journey of Ibn Fattouma revolve around how to correctly organize a society and his personal existential struggles. The main character in the allegory, Qindil, travels to many lands to try to discover a perfect land and when he cannot find one, readers are left to realize whether a perfect society really exists and what a society should be based on. Qindil attempts to determine the meaning of life in relation to who he is. The story relies heavily on self-interpretation creating a path to discovery for Qindil and the reader leaving everyone to question what the real journey was.

== Translations ==
The Journey of Ibn Fattouma was first published in Arabic in 1983, as رحلة إبن فطوم. and has since been translated in German, Italian, and English. The English translation was done by Denys Johnson-Davies. In 2022, the book was translated into Pashto by veteran Pashto writer, Hamayun Masoud, from Swat, Khyber Pakhtunkhwa. It was published by 'Dust On Book', Peshawar.

== Commercial reception ==
On a scale of A-F, complete-review.com gave Journey of Ibn Fattouma an A−, stating that it is “a clever...parable of different forms of governments and societies.”

== Critical reception ==
“The style of the Arabic original is descriptive, sensuous, and sometimes moving. The translation, coming from the pen of an experienced translator, is meticulously faithful to the original while maintaining complete idiomatic English that flows smoothly.”- Issa Peters, World Literature Today

As said by The Complete Review, “The Journey of Ibn Fattouma is a clever if occasionally too simplistic parable of different forms of government and society, seen especially -- and very effectively -- in relation to Islam (both theoretical and the less-than-perfect real-life examples of Islamic states). Qindil's travels and observations are engaging and very nicely related… though much is a bit too quickly brushed over. War breaks out several times too often; presented as it is, it comes to look like an inevitability in practically each of these situations, which doesn't seem to be what Mahfouz means. Qindil's love-life is also a bit odd, his passion understandable but also too quickly indulged in (and then disposed of, as he leaves family after family behind). But the strengths of the text easily outweigh all the weaknesses. An enjoyable and thoughtful novel, certainly recommended,” and gave it a rating of A−.

Erik Cohen describes: “The original, archaic pilgrimage” as “the quest for the mythical land of pristine existence, of no evil or suffering, the primaeval centre from which man originally emerged, but eventually lost it,” (Cohen 182).. . . . . Erik is an Adjunct Fellow at the Ethics and Public Policy Center, as well as a member of EPPC's board of directors. As Issa Peters says, “The Journey of Ibn Fattouma, therefore, is a kind of pilgrim's progress, but the pilgrim here is more of a social reformer than a religious believer impelled by an apocalyptic vision of the divine."

== Inspiration ==
Ibn Battuta, a 14th-century Moroccan explorer, was the inspiration and historical model for the fictitious journey in The Journey of Ibn Fattouma. He was one of the greatest travelers, having visited most of the known world of his day. Ibn Battuta recorded his experiences for posterity in his famous Journey of Ibn Battuta (partly translated into English by H A R Gibb in 1929). Based on the title, The Journey of Ibn Fattouma, Naguib Mahfouz clearly wants readers to be aware of the medieval work while reading his novel. Mahfouz was inspired by Ibn Battuta's journey to write his book, but he did not approach his historically modeled book with a respectful attitude. His intention was partly to parody Ibn Battuta's journey. “Whereas Ibn Battuta travelled in space, his fictitious descendant travels in time; the five 'lands' he visits being, within the allegorical framework of the book, symbolic of stages in the evolution of organised society from the dawn of history to the present day.”

Mahfouz shows that Ibn Fattouma is modeled off of Ibn Battuta, but is not a mirror image of him. Ibn Fattouma criticizes his homeland, whereas Ibn Battuta idealized Islam, regardless of where he traveled. Ibn Fattouma's critiques of Islam seem to create the basis of his journey, as he searches for a place where life is far more ideal than his homeland. He questions God as a merciful being after seeing ignorance and poverty. This fuels his journey and creates a more complex character than if the story was simply following Ibn Battuta, blindly mimicking his every trait.

== Literary significance and criticism ==
The story is a "Morality Play"- it is not just what it may first seem, but in reality it's a story of “extoling the virtues of tolerance and understanding" The Journey of Ibn Fattouma is a simple story of government and society. Critics say that the story is engaging, yet at the same time redundant. Mahfouz is able to capture a lifetime's worth of experiences in one short novel. He is considered as one of the most western of contemporary Arab novelists.

Naguib Mahfouz, the author of The Journey of Ibn Fattouma, portrays himself in his writing, and in the lands and characters of the novel. The revolution of 1919 in Egypt influenced Mahfouz and inspired him to place a symbol of rebellion in the lands Qindil visits. Qindil travels to Mashriq, and discovers the underlying rules and restrictions of the seemingly free and open land. He rebels against the land's religion and attempts to teach his son the Islamic faith. As a result, Qindil is exiled and sent away on the next caravan that arrives. Similar to the revolution in Egypt, Qindil did not aggressively revolt using violence and anger. He was reserved and subtle in his actions. While The Journey of Ibn Fattouma symbolizes the development of human history, it also reflects the author and his connection to the Egyptian Revolution.

The novel is centered around a young traveler, Ibn Fattouma, who closely resembles a 14th-century traveler, Ibn Battuta. While Battuta did not travel to lands similar to those in the novel, his personality and background matched Fattouma's. Ibn Battuta's purpose was to see how the Islamic religion was perceived and practiced in different parts of the world. Ibn Fattouma was based on this real person, Ibn Battuta, who shared with him many similarities.

== Symbolism ==
Cities:

Gebel: Gebelf perfection.

“The Homeland”: It represents where Qindil's values came from

Mashriq: Represents the dawn of civilization and primitive values

Haira: Represents bewilderment and confusion

Halba: Represents Freedom and western (mainly American) culture

Aman: Represents equality in a modern communist government

Ghuroub: Peace and meditation

Characters:

Quindil: Represents humanity

Fam: Guide/Leaders in society

Arousa: Distraction

Samia: Women's rights and intellect

Ham: The effect of propaganda on society

== Notes ==
- El-Enany, Rasheed (1993-01-30). "BOOK REVIEW / Modern cures in an antique mould: The journey of Ibn Fattouma - Naguib Mahfouz, Tr. D Johnson-Davies: Doubleday, pounds 13.99". The Independent. London.
