= Magdi Allam =

Italian politician

- مجدي علام
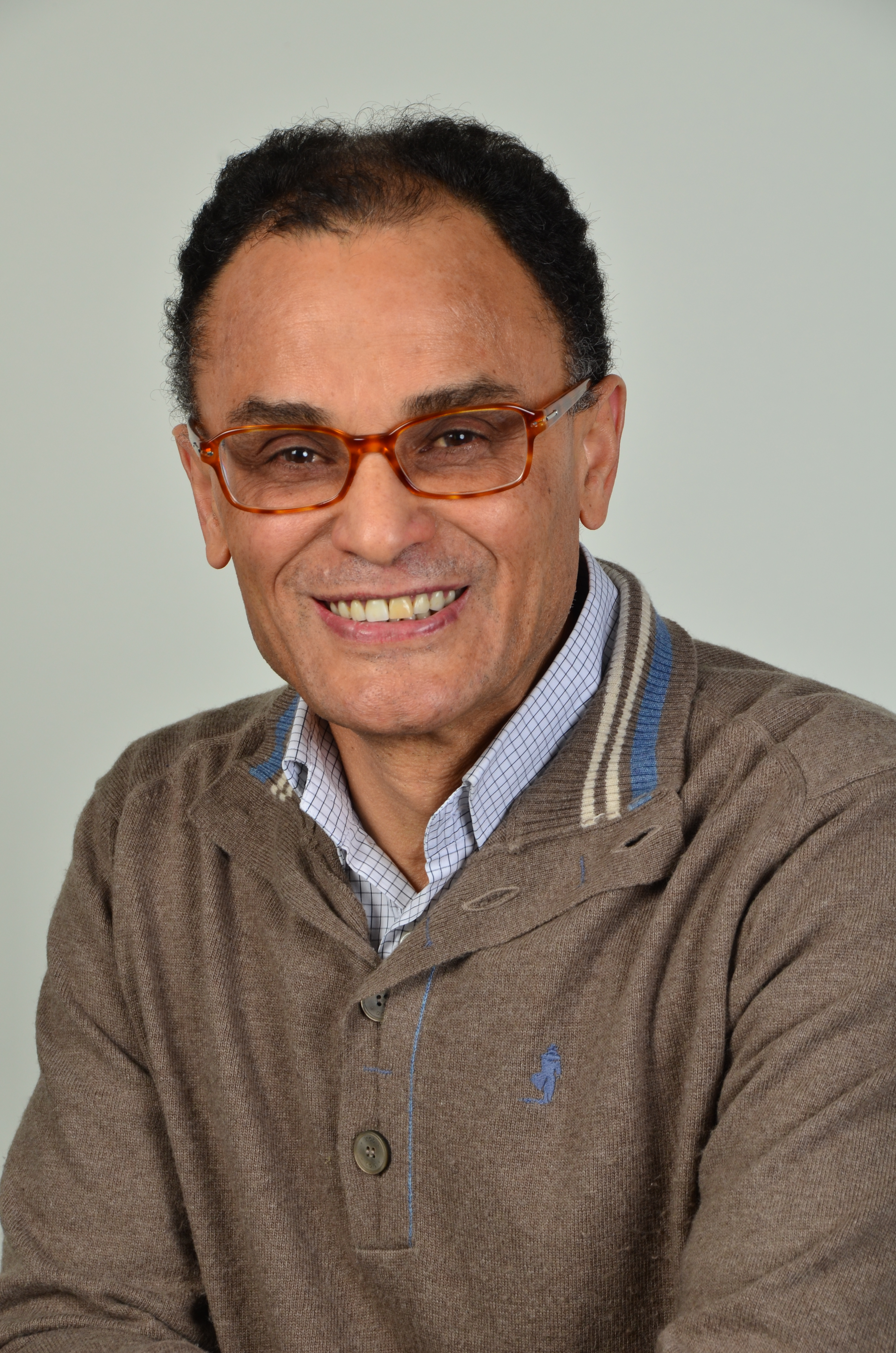
- Born: Magdi Muhammad Allam; 22 April 1952 (age 74); Cairo, Kingdom of Egypt
- Occupations: Politician; journalist; author; columnist
- Political party: Union of the Centre (2008–2010); I Love Italy (2010–2014); Brothers of Italy (2014–2015)
- Spouse: Valentina Colombo
- Children: 3
- Website: magdicristianoallam.it

Magdi Cristiano Allam (born Magdi Muhammad Allam [Arabic: مجدي محمد علام, romanized: Majdī Muḥammad ʿAllām], 22 April 1952) is an Egyptian-Italian journalist and politician, noted for his criticism of Islam and his articles on the relations between Western culture and the Islamic world.

Allam converted from Islam to Catholicism during the Vatican's 2008 Easter Vigil service presided over by Pope Benedict XVI. He served as a regional councillor in the Italian region of Basilicata after being elected in 2010, and was a Member of the European Parliament for Italy from 2009 to 2014.

He has lived under police protection for many years due to death threats from Muslims.

== Biography ==
Allam was born in Egypt and raised by Muslim parents. His mother Safeya Allam was a believing and practicing Muslim, whereas his father Muhammad Allam was "completely secular and agreed with the [until the early seventies widely held] opinion of the majority of Egyptians who took the West as a model in regard to individual freedom, social customs and cultural and artistic fashions." At age four, his mother entrusted him to the care of Sister Lavinia of the Comboni Missionary Sisters, and later he was sent to a Catholic boarding school in Egypt, the Institute of Don Bosco, for junior high and high school.

Allam describes growing up in a vibrant and multicultural Cairo. He recounts vividly the "fragrances, sounds, colors and flavors of his beloved Aunt Adreya's home" and remembers Cairo as a "colorful, pluralistic and tolerant city where girls wore miniskirts and boys sported Beatles haircuts." He has positive memories of Egyptian society during his childhood years, characterizing it as having a "social fabric that embodied a genuine love of others and a simple life where emotion was more important than money." However, an unpleasant incident occurred when he was detained and interrogated at age 15 by the Mukhabarat, or political police, on suspicion of espionage for Israel, because of his relationship with a Jewish girl. Allam's sympathy for the plight of the girl and her family might have displeased the authorities. He claims the trauma of that interrogation accompanied him until Christmas Eve 1972 when he left Egypt to continue his studies in Italy.

In 1972 he moved to Italy and enrolled in Sapienza University of Rome. He graduated from La Sapienza with a degree in sociology and in 1986 became an Italian citizen.

== Journalism career ==
Allam began his journalistic career at the communist newspaper Il Manifesto. In 1978, he moved to the center-left leaning Italian newspaper La Repubblica, where he worked as a commentator, mostly writing about issues faced by extra-communitarian immigrants in Italy, especially those originating from North-Africa, and supporting progressive policies on the immigration issue and on the compatibility of Islam and Western values. In 2003, following a radical shift in his views, Magdi Cristiano Allam joined the more conservative, Milan-based Corriere della Sera as vice-director ad personam.

== Religious beliefs ==
On 23 March 2008, Allam was baptized during the Vatican's 2008 Easter Vigil service in St. Peter's Basilica, presided over by Pope Benedict XVI. The service was widely publicized and televised, as is every Easter Vigil service at the Vatican.

In a 2,000-word letter to the editor of his newspaper, Paolo Mieli, Allam explained his motives for converting to Catholicism. He thanked his mother for sending him to Catholic schools, where he was able to "know Catholicism well and up close and the women and men who dedicated their life to serve God in the womb of the Church." He pointed out that in his youth he had become familiar with Catholic writings ("Already then I read the Bible and the Gospels and I was especially fascinated by the human and divine figure of Jesus.") He credited the Pope as the most influential person in his decision to convert, and, using Christian theological terminology, described his conversion as a mystical experience:

The miracle of Christ's Resurrection reverberated through my soul, liberating it from the darkness in which the preaching of hatred and intolerance in the face of the "different," uncritically condemned as "enemy," were privileged over love and respect of "neighbor."

Announcing his support for proselytizing among Muslims, he wrote: "Well, today Benedict XVI, with his witness, tells us that we must overcome fear and not be afraid to affirm the truth of Jesus even with Muslims." He added on Italian TV that he felt "great joy" after his conversion.

Allam's conversion was criticized both by Muslim associations and by progressive Catholics. The Holy See, despite the baptism of Allam, persisted in Christian-Muslim dialogue and distanced itself from several of Allam's political views. The Union of Islamic Communities in Italy — which Allam has frequently criticized as an organization that incites violence — referred to his baptism as "his own decision". The group's spokesperson, Issedin El Zir, said: "He is an adult, free to make his personal choice." Imam Yahya Sergio Yahe Pallavicini, vice president of the Italian Islamic Religious Community (Comunità Religiosa Islamica Italiana, Co. Re.Is.), said he acknowledged Allam's choice but was amusingly "perplexed" by the symbolic and high-profile way in which Allam chose to convert. Pallavicini explained:

If Allam truly was compelled by a strong spiritual inspiration, perhaps it would have been better to do it delicately, maybe with a priest from Viterbo where he lives.

The Spanish daily El País criticized Allam's opinions and wondered whether Allam's conversion deserved so much attention:

This intellectual doesn't mince his words when it comes to flaying Islam. And he is not entirely wrong when he refers to terrorist fanaticism and the lack of freedom in countries where Islam is professed. He is probably however going a bit far when he says that the "root of evil is an inherent part of Islam, which is physiologically violent". It is not the Muslim world as a whole that defends violence or seeks to impose its religion by force. We shouldn't however play down the courage that Magdi Allam has shown by daring to say such things that way and we also have to recognise his right to convert to Christianity. We can nonetheless ask whether it was necessary for his baptism to have been carried out by the Pope himself in the Vatican.

Some criticized the publicity given to the conversion, thus questioning his sincerity and even suggesting a politically motivated apostasy.

On 25 March 2013, he publicly announced his abandonment of the Catholic Church to protest its "soft stance against Islam". Allam said he would remain a Christian but that he didn't "believe in the church anymore."

== Political career ==
In June 2009, he was elected as a Member of the European Parliament with the center-right Christian-democrat Italian party UDC. He also founded a personal movement called Io amo l'Italia (I Love Italy). However, while a Member of the European Parliament (between 2009 and 2014) he remained a member of the UDC delegation in the EPP party group.

== Views and opinions ==
During most of his journalistic career (roughly from 1978 to 2003), Allam worked at the center-left leaning and moderate La Repubblica. As he was often employed as a Middle East envoy, most of his articles were reportage more than commentaries, characterized by a neutral tone and argumentative style, and his personal views were rarely reported. His own stances were nevertheless made public via a forum on La Repubblica and in numerous interviews and appearances on talk shows.

For a long time, he maintained the position that Islam was compatible with Western civilization and values and he tried to build and believe in a progressive, moderate and liberal Islam. In a meeting with high school students broadcast on Italian public television RAI, he declared:

Islam itself is not a menace, it does not coincide with conservatism, as a religion is not incompatible with progress and freedom; absolutely not! Islam is a faith which, in a moderate interpretation, is absolutely compatible with the values shared by the Italian civil society and the Italian Constitution.

Furthermore, he scorned the idea that Muslims were somehow "invading" Italy:There are many Islam ... . The largest majority of Muslims are moderate, many Muslims are secular ... according to the numbers provided by the Muslim organizations in Italy, no more than 3 to 5% of Muslims in Italy even go to the mosque ... and then there is a fundamentalist Islam that believes in an Islamization of the society that would conjugate religion to politics, and then also a radical Islam, which believes that Islam should be imposed via violent means. But this is an absolutely irrelevant fringe, quantified in Italy around circa 3 to 4% of the Muslims, and – let's remember it – there are overall only 600,000 Muslims in Italy. 600,000 in a country of 57 millions. Clearly to talk of a risk of Muslim invasion or of a Muslim menace does not make any sense.

Similarly, he maintained for years that immigration was beneficial for Italy, offsetting population decline and correcting what he called "Italy's provincial identity":

Economically Italy needs immigrants. Socially Italy needs immigrants to offset the lowest fertility index of Europe ... . But [stopping immigration] would also be a catastrophe for Italy as a civilization, because the immigrant is a bridge that allows Italy to escape a very provincial sense of identity into a more global one ... . Immigration is a resource, not a problem.

But Allam also argued that all hosting countries must demand respect for its rules and regulations. He firmly believes in an immigration based on "Non solo diritti, ma anche doveri" (not only rights, but duties as well), reciprocal respect for a better society of social enrichment.

After the 9/11 attacks he commented against the clash of civilizations theory, and denounced the idea of a monolithic Islam, intrinsically extremist at its core and naturally driven to expansionism and extremism (a thesis he would come to embrace a few months later):

Q: Will there be a clash of civilizations?

This thesis is based on the idea that Islam is a monolithic reality, with an integralistic identity, and a deep-rooted inclination toward expansionism. In reality both Islam as a faith and Muslims as individuals are [to be understood as a plurality]. However, the risk of an ideological confrontation could come true if Muslims feel they are the indiscriminate target of the West's reaction. Thus the eventual consolidation of Muslims on radical positions would be a gift given to Bin Laden.

Before converting to Christianity, Magdi Cristiano Allam was raised as a Muslim. He made the pilgrimage to Mecca, with his deeply religious mother in 1991. In his autobiography Vincere la paura (Conquering Fear), Cristiano Allam acknowledges thinking about conversion to Christianity on moving to Italy.

Starting from the end of 2002, Allam gradually assumed virtually opposite opinions on most issues related to Islamic world and Middle-East. He accused Italy and the West of ignoring the dangers of an imminent "Islamization" of the society, and a possible Jihad in Europe.

His themes and styles parallel those of the famous Italian journalist Oriana Fallaci. Both authors would extensively refer very positively to each other in their writings. For example, Allam refers many times to Fallaci in his I love Italy, but do Italians Love her? and fully agrees with her positions on these issues. His newfound explicit style has been described by his lifelong friend and noted Italian-Jewish intellectual Gad Lerner as "Pharaonic Sturm und Drang" and as having "fideistic emphasis."

In his writings since 2003, Allam has stated his denunciations of multiculturalism, lashing out at what he calls "the Islamization of society." For example, reacting to a speech by Archbishop of Canterbury Rowan Williams which raised the suggestion that Muslims in Britain should be allowed to have their own courts in matters of family law, Allam wrote that

By leaning on the 'politically correct' and by allowing Muslims to have their own courts, a mixture is installed that can unbalance the country and overthrow constitutional order. Previously having been a believer in multiculturalism, he now claimed that multiculturalism is dangerous and wrote against "submitting ourselves to different ideologies and faiths."

=== Criticism of Islam ===
In his public letter to the editor of Corriere della Sera about his conversion, Allam stated that Islam was inseparable from Islamic extremism. Criticising Islam itself, rather than Islamic extremism, Allam argued:

I asked myself how it was possible that those who, like me, sincerely and boldly called for a 'moderate Islam,' assuming the responsibility of exposing themselves in the first person in denouncing Islamic extremism and terrorism, ended up being sentenced to death in the name of Islam on the basis of the Qur'an. I was forced to see that, beyond the contingency of the phenomenon of Islamic extremism and terrorism that has appeared on a global level, the root of evil is inherent in an Islam that is physiologically violent and historically conflictive.

In 2012 he participated in the international counter-jihad conference in Brussels, billed as the "International Conference for Free Speech & Human Rights". He was also announced as a speaker at a conference of Stop Islamization of Nations (SION) in New York City the same year.

In 2005, Allam published an article calling for a ban on building mosques in Italy. In a piece accusing mosques of fostering hate, he claimed Italy is suffering from "mosque-mania" and justified the extreme measure of a government ban on building mosques.

=== Support of Israel ===
The change allowed him to become a staunch supporter of Israel, argue against the formula "territories for peace" which he had championed for more than 25 years. His unwavering support for Israel, he claims, is because the "origin of the ideology of hatred, violence and death is the discrimination against Israel."

For most of his life he had been a strong albeit argumentative supporter of the Palestinian cause, going to rallies and writing favorably of the Palestinian rights to statehood. However, since 2002, Allam has voiced support of Israel, together with a strong condemnation of Palestinian terrorism. He claims that his criticism of Palestinian terrorism prompted Hamas to allegedly single him out for elimination. According to Italian and Egyptian secret services, Hamas and Egyptian terrorists Islamist groups has claimed responsibility for such a threat. Therefore, in 2003, the Italian government provided him with a sizable security detail.

On the issue of Iran's nuclear quest, Magdi Cristiano Allam has said Israel should do whatever it takes to stop Iran's nuclear program, indirectly suggesting that Israel should bomb Iranian nuclear facilities. Labeling the Iranian government "the Nazi-Islamic" regime, Allam claimed that Israel cannot rely on the United Nations and should not have any illusions about the Bush administration "which now wants only to leave Iraq without losing face."

== Controversy ==
On 16 January 2007, in an article entitled Poligamia, la moglie che accusa il capo UCOII (literally: "Polygamy, the wife who accuses UCOII's leader") on Corriere della Sera, Magdi Allam published an e-mail — obtained from a third party—sent to Hamza Roberto Piccardo, spokesman of the Unione delle Comunità ed Organizzazioni Islamiche in Italia, by Piccardo's recently divorced wife, without asking for the authorization of either ex-spouse. In spite of the uproar that followed, RCS Quotidiani S.p. A, the publisher of Corriere della Sera, chose to keep the article online until the "Garante per la protezione dei dati personali" (Guarantor for the protection of personal data) ordered RCS to take it down on 24 May 2007.

Italian writer Valerio Evangelisti has nicknamed him "Pinocchio d'Egitto" (Egyptian Pinocchio). In a review of Allam's 2002 book on Saddam Hussein ("Saddam: Secret History of a Dictator"), he points to the absence of a real bibliography, and to the ridiculously poor quality of the sources. He pokes fun at the fact that the only cited reference for the entire second chapter is an article from popular Italian tabloid Gente, titled "I slept with Saddam for thirty years":

Allam is the author of essays of relevant scientific value, no doubt. The last one is titled "Saddam, a dictator's secret history" ... . The book reads with ever increasing bewilderment ... . Three chapters out of seven are based on a single tabloid article ... . Never had I seen the tabloid Gente been used as a source for a historical/sociological analysis. I guess we are witnessing a revolution in the methodology of social sciences.

Allam has supporters among his newer readership, as well as within the anti-immigration party the Lega Nord, and among Catholic members of Forza Italia and its electorate. His Godfather was Maurizio Lupi, an elected representative of Forza Italia with connections to the Vatican establishment.

Vittorio Zucconi, deputy director of La Repubblica, the newspaper for which Allam had worked for more than 20 years, humorously compared his new pose of "defender of the West" to American actress Doris Day. Asked by a reader to comment on Allam's quite sudden change of opinions and recent controversial role, Zucconi answered:

I know Magdi all too well, and I love him too much (I swear) to break with him my resolution of never criticizing a fellow journalist. But your question Sir reminds me of a famous joke about Doris Day, the blond, chaste, dolled-up actress of the 60's: "I knew Doris before she became a virgin."

== Personal life ==
Allam is married to scholar Valentina Colombo, and they have a son together.

He also has two children from a previous marriage.

== Published works ==
- Viva Israele (Long Live Israel), Mondadori, 2007, ISBN 978-88-04-56777-6
- Io amo l'Italia. Ma gli italiani la amano? (I love Italy. But do the Italians love her?), Mondadori, 2006, ISBN 88-04-55655-2
- Vincere la paura: La mia vita contro il terrorismo islamico e l'incoscienza dell'Occidente (Conquering Fear: My life against Muslim terrorism and Western unconsciousness), Mondandori, 2005, ISBN 88-04-55605-6
- Kamikaze made in Europe. Riuscirà l'Occidente a sconfiggere i terroristi islamici? (Kamikaze made in Europe. Will the West defeat Islamic terrorists?), Mondadori, 2004, ISBN
- Diario dall'Islam (A diary from Islam), Mondadori, 2002, ISBN 88-04-50478-1
- Bin Laden in Italia. Viaggio nell'Islam Radicale (Bin Laden in Italy. A journey through radical Islam), Mondadori, 2002, ISBN 88-04-51416-7
- Jihad in Italia. Viaggio nell'Islam Radicale (Jihad in Italy. A journey through radical Islam), Mondadori, 2002, ISBN 88-04-52421-9
- Saddam. Storia Segreta di un Dittatore (Saddam. A dictator's secret history), Mondadori, 2002, ISBN 978-88-04-51633-0

== Awards and recognition ==
In 2006, Allam was awarded the $1 million Dan David Prize along with three other journalists. Allam was cited for "his ceaseless work in fostering understanding and tolerance between cultures." During his speech, he received a standing ovation from the audience when he proclaimed, "Am Yisrael Chai."

On 4 May 2007 Allam was presented with the American Jewish Committee's Mass Media Award at its 101st Annual Meeting.
