= Qismati and Nasibi =

"Qismati and Nasibi (My Fate and My Destiny)"
- Short story by Naguib Mahfouz
- Translator: Ronak Husni and Daniel Newman
- Country: Egypt
- Language: Arabic

Publication
- Publication type: Short story collection
- Publication date: 1982
- Published in English: 2008
- Series: Ra’aytu fima yara al-na’im (I Saw, in a Dream, or I Saw as the Sleeper Sees)

Qismati and Nasibi is a short story written by Nobel Prize winning Egyptian author Naguib Mahfouz. It was included in the short story collection Ra’aytu fima yara al-na’im (I Saw, in a Dream, or I Saw as the Sleeper Sees) published in 1982. It was included in a collection of short stories written in Arabic Modern Arabic Short Stories: A Bilingual Reader, edited/translated into English by Ronak Husni and Daniel Newman. The title in Arabic means "My Fate and My Destiny." It is frequently interpreted to be an allegory of the Palestinian-Israeli situation.

== Plot summary ==
The story opens with a presentation of Mohsen Khalil, a spice seller. Despite his good fortune and many prayers, this man and his wife Sitt Anabaya have been unable to conceive. At the age of forty, Sitt discovers that she is pregnant. She gives birth to conjoined twins, a child with one body and two chests and heads. The parents are distraught but resigned to this fate. They name one child Qismati (My Fate) and the other one Nasibi (My Destiny), though they are registered on the birth certificate as one child. Each develops a distinct physical aspect: Qismati has a dark complexion with hazel eyes while Nasibi is fair with black eyes. Nasibi is naughty and destructive; he enjoys chasing chickens and torturing cats. Qismati is submissive and quietly religious.

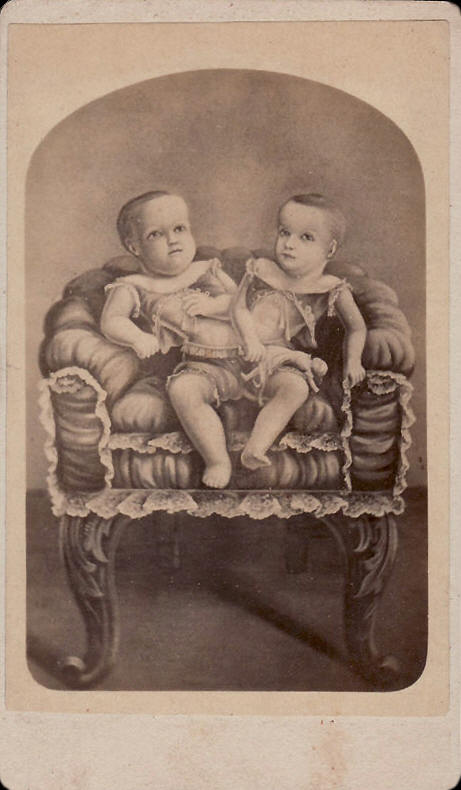
The St. Benoit twins were conjoined much as Qismati and Nasibi

Socialization for the child is difficult because the situation is so unusual. The neighbors are curious but cautious and the parents have to bribe them to get their children to play with Nasibi and Qismati. Amorous affection for a young girl named Samiha provokes aggression and jealousy in the twins, and then a black eye and a bloody lip. Schooling must be done in the home, where Qismati proves an able and engaged student while Nasibi is uninterested and has little talent for learning. Nasibi does all he can to undermine his brother's efforts. Even fasting becomes an issue because when Qismati wants to fast, Nasibi eats and fills their shared abdomen.

As they grow older, the boys become more different in their character and demeanor, and increasingly dislike each other. This creates a terrible and unsolvable dilemma since they cannot separate from each other. Qismati enjoys reading and learning; Nasibi prefers to run outside and annoy the neighbors. These differences cause countless fights and the parents grow increasingly wearied by the constant conflict. Despite the counseling of their father to find compromise and harmony, the boys cannot resolve their differences and refuse to love each other. They are provided a wife and a job working in their father's shop, but these benefits do nothing to allay the twins' despair. They blame each other and their parents for the misfortune of their birth. Nasibi becomes more and more miserable, aging prematurely as his health declines. Finally he dies, leaving Qismati in the strange position of carrying his brother's dead corpse around to live a half-life, half-death. Unable to adjust, Qismati, too, dies shortly afterward.

== Style ==
Translators Ronak Husni and Daniel Newman have described the story as tragicomedy, magical realism, and as an allegory with multiple interpretations, which has prompted comparisons to some of Mahfouz's other works such as Children of Our Alley. "Qismati and Nasibi" has been interpreted by a former minister of Spain as an allegory of the Arab-Israeli conflict, an interpretation that Mahfouz responded to as 'strange' and over which he expressed frustration. Nevertheless, he also acknowledged that the reception and interpretation of a work depends on the reader, since each reader understands a work differently. A later interview in April,1997, revealed that the author had accepted that the story was "strangely appropriate to Palestine, the land claimed by both Palestinians and Israelis. History has shown that separating the two is almost impossible." He went on to explain more of how to understand this interpretation of the allegory through the two main characters: "In the story, My Fate takes the initiative toward peaceful coexistence, whereas My Destiny is more aggressive and less willing to coexist... The current Israeli government is trying to... force the Palestinians to accept and submit to the status quo. But a peace built on submission is no lasting peace.... Mahfouz's work is recognized as being rich in possibilities for interpretation and reception, so no one interpretation should be assigned to the short story.

The short story appears in a collection of dream-like stories and so may better be considered a bad dream. Many of the "dreams" in the collection are influenced by the author's reading of medieval adventures and the allegorical ghost story by Muhammad al-Muwaylihi based on them, The Tale of Isa ibn Hisham. The short stories reflect the ancient Arabic fascination with presenting dreams and their interpretations in literature. Mahfouz himself reveals that most of his material comes from his dreams.

The story features themes such as good and evil, the social responsibility of man, destiny, fate, and death.

== Popular Appreciation ==
The study of Arabic literature has become more accessible to English readers in recent years as more work written in Arabic has been translated into other languages, especially since Mahfouz was awarded the Nobel Prize for Literature. Because "Qismati and Nasibi" was included in a readily available collection of Arabic short stories translated into English, it receives a good deal of popular attention. It is analyzed, for example, in the collection of Menomim Menonimus. The multiple possibilities for interpretation of the allegory, coupled with its association with the Palestinian-Israeli conflict, make this short story stand out in the canon of Arabic literature.
