= The Day the Leader Was Killed =

1983 novel by Naguib Mahfouz

- 1983 arabic edition
- Author: Naguib Mahfouz
- Original title: يوم قتل الزعيم
- Translator: Malak. Mashem
- Language: Arabic
- Genre: Novel
- Publisher: Doubleday Eng. trans.
- Publication date: 1983
- Publication place: Egypt
- English publication date: 1987
- Media type: Print (Paperback)
- ISBN: 978-0-385-49922-4 (Eng. trans. paperback edition)
- OCLC: 43499501
- Dewey Decimal: 892.7/36 21
- LC Class: PJ7846.A46 Y3813 2000

The Day the Leader Was Killed (orig. Arabic يوم قُتِل الزعيم) is a novel written and published by Nobel Prize-winning author Naguib Mahfouz in 1983.

== Plot summary ==
The novel follows multiple narratives written in the stream of consciousness format. The novel is set in 1981 whilst Egyptian President Anwar Sadat was introducing the infitah or open door free-market economic policies which led to widespread unrest. The plot revolves around a young Egyptian man who is in love with a co-worker, but her father will not permit their marriage because the young man cannot earn enough money to purchase and furnish an apartment. Told from the perspective of Elwan, Randa and Elwan's grandfather Muhtashimi. Trapped in low-paid jobs amidst years of inflation and uneven distribution of wealth, Elwan and Randa's engagement has persisted for years without Elwan finding the means to fulfill the financial obligations for marriage. Elwan refuses to accede to corruption or outside work to improve these circumstances, and both characters are noble and proud but perceived by others to be impractical and stagnant. Randa is pressured by her family and her government superior - Anwar - to break off the engagement as her advancing years means she will soon find herself too old to be desirable to potential suitors. Anwar simultaneously pressures Elwan to reconsider his circumstances and introduces him to his widowed sister, Gulstan, who is wealthy and looking for a new husband. Elwan finds himself attracted to Gulstan and feels sexual desire he has had to long suppress on account of his attenuated engagement to Randa. Muhtashimi is disappointed that his beloved grandson finds himself in his situation, and his narrative questions the direction of the country which as a younger man he had ardently fought to create as an activist teacher in the nationalist movement. Punctuated throughout the novel are comments on the decline of Sadat's Egypt and the increasing national despair amidst a revolution that has gradually lost its way.

Matters come to a head when Randa's mother visits Elwan's family and lays plain the problems of the engagement. Elwan's family is sympathetic as Elwan, as a man, may marry easily at any age. Elwan, unable to bear the social pressure and the lack of support for continued engagement from his family or colleagues, releases Randa from her obligations to him, despite great personal angst at betraying his love for her. Randa is in disbelief and then furious at Elwan, breaking off most contact between them and quickly dismissing her deep-seated love for Elwan, whilst Elwan remains tortured and despairing of the turn of events. She soon pursues a relationship with Anwar and then marries him, seeing it as a practical and viable alternative after years of torpor with Elwan. However she is soon disenchanted when she realizes despite Anwar's long overtures, the marriage is not one of true emotional connection and Anwar merely desires Randa as means to befit his social position and serve domestic functions. Randa, caught between modern ideals and traditional obligations, struggles with the new role and then quickly rejects it, seeking a quick divorce, which throws her and Anwar into social disrepute. Elwan meanwhile pursues a relationship of sorts Gulstan and considers marrying her, but his pride refuses the notion of him being 'sold' and he feels any match with Gulstan will be socially embarrassing and speak to weakness. Randa and Elwan reacquaint after Randa's divorce and Randa confesses the lie of the marriage to Anwar, which angers Elwan but does not lead to their reconciliation.

At the crescendo of the story, President Sadat is assassinated, much to the horror of the characters in the story. Provoked by the events while despairing of his country and himself, Elwan goes to meet with Gulstan but finds Anwar there. In uncharacteristic rage, Elwan unleashes on Anwar kills him. The horrified Gulstan attempts to help Elwan cover up the murder on account of Anwar's pre-existing heart condition and her feelings for Elwan, but Elwan is resigned to fate and only half-heartedly attempts to conceal his crime. Elwan is imprisoned, bringing the story of Egypt's path and Elwan's into alignment. The novel ends with Muhtashimi's regret over the twin courses of disappointment, and regards Egypt as a nation caught between its many problems and a national character with occasional victories but far many disappointments and failings. Muhtashimi however recalls over the course of the novel his great faith in the teachings of the prophet and Islam, and ultimately believes as he prepares to die that faith will see his family, his grandson and his country through these yet again difficult times.

Like many of Mahfouz's novels, the book uses Egyptian history and society to analyze universal themes such as the relationship between love and economics, familiar relationships, death, and the irrationality of human emotion.
