= Love in the Rain =

1973 novel by Naguib Mahfouz

- Author: Naguib Mahfouz
- Translator: Nancy Roberts
- Language: Arabic/English (Trans.)
- Genre: Literary Fiction
- Published: 1973
- Publisher: Dar El-Shorouk Publishing
- Publication place: Cairo, Egypt
- Pages: 168

Love in the Rain (Al-Ḥob Taḥtal Maṭar) is one of Naguib Mahfouz's most popular novels. It received a lot of acclaim from critics, and readers. The novel was adapted into a film in 1975, and it was directed by Hussein Kamal, starring Mervat Amin, Ahmad Ramzi, Adel Adham, Imad Hamdi, Magda Al-Khatib, Hayat Qindil, and other notable actors.

== Summary ==
The novel centers on the cinematic photographer "Hosny Hejazi" who helps girls in reaching high artistic positions, but in exchange for a price. He was also the only witness one of the novel's heroine's, Samraa', death. Samraa' jumps from one relationship to the other, until she gets into a relationship with Aaliyat's father, who kills her to protect his daughter, who has premarital sex and as a result, falls pregnant. All this happens after she finishes her university studies and gets appointed in Cario by the Ministry of Social Affairs, forcing her to part with her long-term lover 'Marzuq' after his employment out of town. On his way to his new job, he meets the director 'Mohammad Rashwat' who offers him the role of a hero in a cinematic work. Marzuq accepts Mohammad's offer and whilst filming, he meets 'Fitna' and ends up marrying her and forgetting all about 'Aaliyat'. Then, he gets attacked by a group of anonymous people, which disfigures his appearance, ending his career before it properly begins. The side characters in the novel have important roles and are not neglected. The novel presents snippets of life under war and poverty through the masterfully told events. The characters reflect the depth in humanity's simplicity. Naguib Mahfouz discusses the period between the Naksa and the Egyptian Forces passing through Bar Lev Line. The novel embodies love and all its contradictory emotions, like loyalty, love, anger, jealousy, unconventional relationships, and even murder, in the post-Naksa period. Mahfouz also presents the youth of the post-Naksa period, whose dreams is to immigrate and run away. To illustrate this, Mahfouz says in his novel "hometown is no longer land and borders, it is mind and soul".

== Characters in The Novel ==
- Hosny Hejazi
- Marzuq
- Salem Ali
- Ibrahim

== Critical analyses ==
Similar to other Naguib Mahfouz novels, (Love in the Rain) does not align with the conventional Arabic novel, for it does not have a specific conflict. Instead, it reads as a collection of ambiguously tied events, and it is on the reader to figure out the connection between them. In similar vein to Mahfouz's other major works, this novel navigates political and social issues. For example, it spans the 3-years period from the Six-Day War (1967) and Rogers Plan (1970), which is a politically charged period, and the characters in the novel showcase the pressure this period puts them in.
