= The Harafish =

1977 novel by Naguib Mahfouz

- Early Arabic edition
- Author: Naguib Mahfouz
- Original title: ملحمة الحرافيش
- Translator: Catherine Cobham
- Language: Arabic
- Genre: Novel
- Publisher: Maktabat Misr (1977 arabic); Doubleday (Eng. trans.)
- Publication date: 1977
- Publication place: Egypt
- English publication date: April 1994
- Media type: Print (Paperback)
- ISBN: 0-385-42324-1 (Eng. trans.)
- OCLC: 27894526
- Dewey Decimal: 892/.736 20
- LC Class: PJ7846.A46 M2813 1994

The Harafish (Arabic: الحرافيش) (in orig. Arabic Malhamat al-harafish) is a 1977 novel written by Naguib Mahfouz. It comprises a series of episodes in a dozen generations of a family from the Egyptian urban rabble (the "harafish"). Many of the members of this family become clan chiefs in an alley in the city; some of them are benefactors to the other members of the harafish; some are more corrupt. Neither the location within Egypt nor the time of the events is ever identified.

Although location and timing are never specified, inferences can be made to narrow the possible locations. Reference to location is made several times in The Harafish (English translation). When Ashur and Fulla flee the plague-infested alley, they reside in the caves of the foothills. Ashur leaves the cave "to take water from the public drinking fountain in Darasa" (p. 39). Darasa is located east of present-day Cairo, between the foothills and the Nile river. Further reference to the Nile occurs on page 356: "Strange rumours came from outside the alley. The Nile was not going to flood that year."
