= Zaabalawi =

1988 story by Naguib Mahfouz

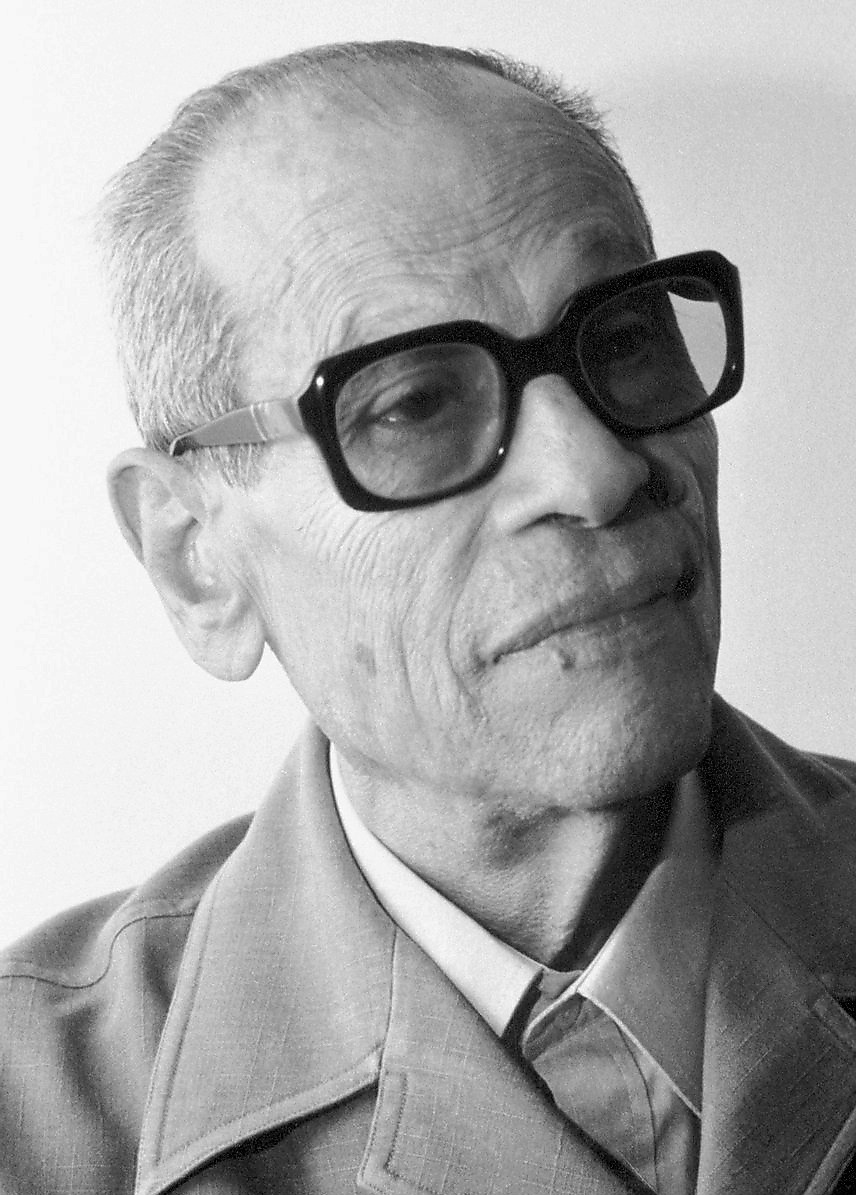
Nagib Mahfouz

Zaabalawi (Arabic: زعبلاوي) is a short story by Egyptian writer Naguib Mahfouz, first published in 1961 and reprinted in the collection Dunya Allah ("God's World") in 1963. The story follows an unnamed narrator who suffers from an incurable illness and searches for Sheikh Zaabalawi, a man believed to possess healing powers.

== Plot summary ==
The story begins in the middle of the event with the need of the anonymous narrator for a Sheikh named Zaabalawi had known in his childhood about from a song and as any other child, he asked his father who is Zaabalawi? His father responded "May his blessing descend upon you, he's a true saint of God, a remover of worries and troubles. Were it not for him I would have died miserably". The narrator then mentioned the reason for his search for Sheikh Zaabalawi, and the reason is that he is suffering from a disease that has no medicine. He went to the house of Sheikh Qamar Khan Khan Jaafar, who was a friend of his father before he died, the narrator states that he found a beautiful woman with a strong perfume smell coming out from the house of Sheikh Qamar and also he mentioned that the Sheikh wears a modern suit and seems to be wealthy, after the narrator introduced himself to the Sheikh asked him about Sheikh Zaabalawi, Sheikh Qamar answered that he barely remembers him and then said that he lives in a place called a quarter of Berjawi in Al-Azhar.

The narrator went looking for Zaabalawi in the desired place. Asking People and shops in the neighborhoods about Zaabalawi, and it turns out that the majority of people have never heard of him. And some started to talk about the good days that they have spent with Zaabalawi, and others made fun of him and they told him to go to see a doctor but the narrator responded that he already did, but that was useless.There was no result, and the narrator returned to his house with no hope. And perhaps spend days and months looking for him to no avail, Sheikh painted a map of the place in the smallest details and Present it to the narrator to make it easier for him to search for Zaabalawi.

The narrator continues his search from a shop to a neighborhood to a mosque until he was told to go to a calligrapher named Hassanein residing in Umm Ghulam. Indeed, the narrator went to the calligrapher shop and found Hassanein surrounded by paintings engraved the name of God in the middle of a painting. The narrator asked him about Zaabalawi and Hassanein replied that it was difficult to meet, because he appears without a date and cuts off suddenly. He also mentioned that he had inspired him in his paintings. The narrator left hopeless asking people in the streets about Zaabalawi until he found a music composer that it has been said that he had spent time with Zaabalawi, the narrator managed to find the music composer and he asked him about Zaabalawi and the musician said that he knew him, but not anymore after a short conversation about the nights that he had spent with Zaabalawi and how he inspired him to compose his greatest music pieces. And ended his speech by leading the narrator to a person called Wannis Al-Damanhouri who spends his time in a bar inside a hotel and he may know where Zaabalawi is.The narrator went to the bar to find Al Haj Wannis sitting at a table alone drinking wine.

The narrator went to the bar to find Haj and Nis sitting at a table alone drinking wine. The narrator spoke to him but he interrupted him, saying: "Sit first and get drunk." The narrator tried to explain to him that he doesn't drink alcohol, but Al Haj Wannis did not care. He told him, "This is your business and this is my condition." The narrator drank the first and second cup and he forgot why he came, by finishing the fourth cup he fell in a deep sleep. He mentioned that he had the most beautiful dream he had ever seen. And he was in a place full of trees and harmonious music and he felt peace inside of him. He soon woke up to find his head wet with water and he Al Haj Wannis about what happened and he answered that his friend Sheikh Zaabalawi was sitting next to him pouring water gently on his head in the hope that you wake up, the narrator in a state of panic asking "Zaabalawi? Where is he? I came to here searching for him and he ran shouting “Zaabalawi” in every corner, but it was useless.But he felt comfortable for some time because it was confirmed that Zaabalawi existed. The narrator returned the next day to the pub hoping to meet Zaabalawi but he didn't find him. Here the story ends and the narrator is still looking for Zaabalawi and whenever he feels disappointed he remembers his sickness and he thinks of Zaabalawi to continue his search for him.

== Themes ==
=== Quest ===
One of the most important themes that the story provides is the theme of quest, as we see from the beginning of the story, the narrator has no direct clear destination that has a meaning, or the thing that he is searching for really exists. But instead he is in a searching loop that will never end and that was causing him more sickness that the only thing that could cure it is meeting Sheikh Zaabalawi and then the searching journey will end. Because the sickness that the narrator suffers from is a psychological and even spiritual sickness not a physical one, we saw that the narrator was searching alone, with no company to ease his pressure and that might refer to the Islamic religion because the believer of Allah does not have a priest to confess to. His connection with God is direct, it has no intermediary to make the thing easier. We also don't know anything about the narrator's personality or any details about him and that is symbolic as well. Mahfouz might be representing all people through this character.

=== Existential philosophy ===
The story raised the issue of human existence and its significance, and the search for a goal of life, compared with the novel "Waiting for Godot" by the Irish writer Samuel Beckett, Zaabalawi refers to the same idea, It is a wait and constant search for an idea that may be spiritual or existential and in the end it does not appear this idea causing disappointment to the searcher, pain and despair, and this issue of research is not new in human history, but it is one of the most important issues that human tried to solve its mystery.

=== Social criticism ===
The narrator's search throughout Cairo, besides moving from West to East, as evidenced in the dress of those whom he meets, is also a movement towards timelessness, evanescence, the eternal now. He begins by meeting a religious lawyer and scholar, Sheikh Qamar. This is a man well-versed in the Sharia, as all Sufis must be. But this man is also a manifestation of the ossification of a lived religious experience. His dress and his office furnishings give him away as a man tainted by non-Islamic influences. He is unsure if Zaabalawi is even alive. He has long since lost touch with him. The next person the narrator encounters is the seller of books on theology and mysticism. While he is moving closer to the lived religious experience, the decay of the surroundings, and the fact that this man is engaged in commerce surrounding what should be a non-commercial activity, suggests that the narrator is still far removed from the mystical experience.

The other shopkeepers in the area only reinforce this reading, as they have either not heard of Zaabalawi or they openly make fun of him. Here are two institutions which are hardly momentary. That is, the Sharia, Hadith, and other interpretations of the Qur'an and the Prophet's life have been around since the inception of Islam. The local magistrate of the district is the narrator's next stop, and he is presented with a plan for canvassing the entire area. A map is gridded with coordinates and he must approach this search as scientifically as possible. The attempt here is to codify what is considered ineffable.

The prayer of supplication which the Sheikh offers is the first time any one of our narrator's erstwhile helpers has mentioned God. This is fortuitous, for immediately following this ejaculation (please pardon my Christianizing of such spontaneous prayer, but Sufism has no term for this; it is not a Sufi practice or discipline), he offers our narrator this advice: "Look carefully in the cafes, the places where the dervishes perform their rites, the mosques and the prayer rooms and the Green Gate, for he may well be concealed among the beggars and be indistinguishable from them." In mentioning the dervishes, the Sheikh has introduced one of the strands of Sufism, and alluded to Hadhra, one of the five major Sufi practices. But again, the Sheikh is a political leader. A calligrapher is the next stop for the narrator, and here we move closer to the capture of the present moment. This artist illustrates passages from the Qur'an, or embellishes the name of god. The narrator interrupts him at his easel, only to find that Zaabalawi has not been to see him in a long time. However, we also see that Zaabalawi has been the inspiration for the artist's creations. Here, in the realm of art, beyond politics or commerce or law, we are coming closer to Zaabalawi's true residence. Of course, we run into a great contradiction, concerning the timelessness of art, but I'd like to address that below. It's not until the narrator meets Sheikh Gad, the composer, that we get great detail about the absent mystic. And here, with the musician, in the evanescence of music, we learn the most about him. We could take Schopenhauer's approach, where music is the expression of the Universal Will, and it analogously reflects, within its harmony, melodies, rhythm and meter, the structure of the physical world. This will serve to illustrate the great power of music, but it does not address why Mahfouz places it here, near the core of our narrator's experience. Ernst Roth, the music publisher, offers an explanation as to why this is so: The musical score, or whatever the graphic representation of music may be called, does not constitute the work in the same simple sense as a canvas or a printed page constitutes a visual or literary work. This is the fundamental difference between music and the other arts: its glory and, if you will, its tragedy. Recreation is not a mechanical process, just as a good cookery book is not a guarantee of good cooking. "The real beauty of music cannot be put down on paper," wrote Liszt, and this is not only true of beauty. Neither can the real meaning be laid down once and for all, as in the other arts; it must be guessed at or sensed. There is a void, a space, left in every work of music, which must be filled by the re-creator. (Preface) This recognition of the presentness of music, of the existence of music only in the now, is Mahfouz's first use of the mystical state. Music, then, is both in time and out of it. You cannot find it in the past or the future, only in the present. When you think on it, you are not thinking on music, but only on your experience of it, your memory of it. We have moved from law to commerce to politics to calligraphy to music, and at every step we have come closer to the evanescent, and the ineffable. If we don't get it, Sheikh Gad rams the point home by stating that Zaabalawi himself "is the epitome of things musical."

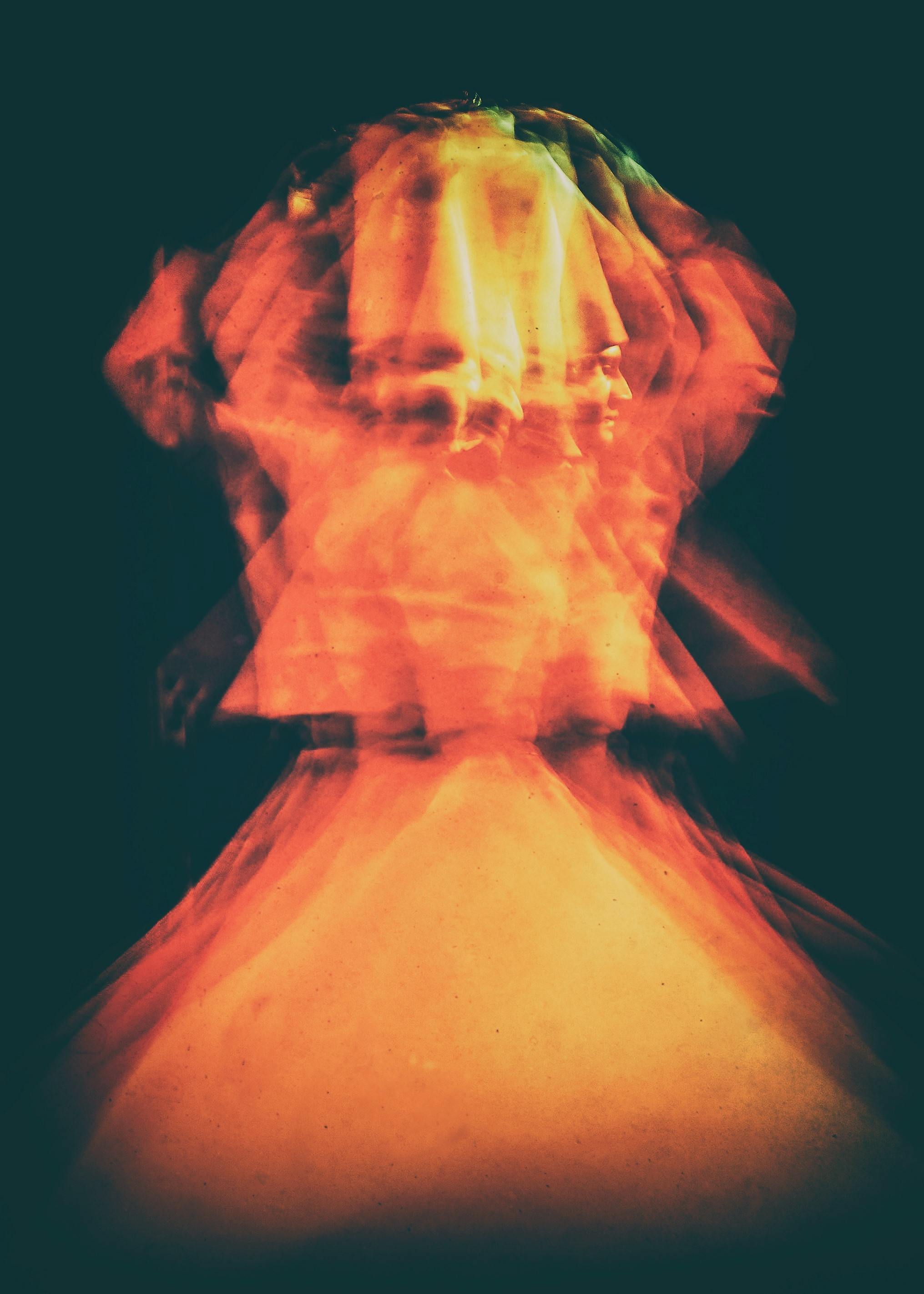
Sufism

=== Sufism ===
William Chittick, arguably the most prominent scholar of Islamic mysticism in the West, explains the place of mysticism in Islam thus: In short, Muslim scholars who focused their energies on understanding the normative guidelines for the body came to be known as jurists, and those who held that the most important task was to train the mind in achieving correct understanding came to be divided into three main schools of thought – theology, philosophy, and Sufism. . . . Most Muslims who devoted their major efforts to developing the spiritual dimensions of the human person came to be known as Sufis. They taught that people must attune their intentions, their love, and their sincerity to the divine will. A Sufi is someone who is striving to or has mastered his or her ego and attained a higher state of consciousness and union with the Godhead. The goal of the Sufi Path is for the drop of water (the individual self) to merge with the Ocean of Being from whence it came. This spiritual path (tariqah) encourages one to perform this or make this transition consciously while still in the body. The central Sufi theory is Wahadat Al Wajud, the Unity of Being, or oneness of existence. This summarizes the Sufi quest of not just seeking a union with the Divine Being, but the realization of the truth that the mystic is one with the Divine. To teach this, the Sufi poets used the imagery of the lover and beloved in the love poetry or romances. According to Hujwiri, the first Sufi in India, he who is purified by love is pure, and he who is absorbed in the Beloved and has abandoned all else is a Sufi.

=== Other themes the story includes ===
Attack on fossilized religious institutions; only certain figures such as artists (musicians, the calligrapher) and the drunk seem to be in contact with the truth symbolized by Zaabalawi.

An allegory hinting at the possible human significance of religion and its supposedly transcendental symbols; an attempt to redefine God in human, social, and earthly terms.

In Mahfouz's vision those who only seek personal gain and profit are distanced from the truth and genuine fulfillment; the happiness of the individual can only come through social engagement and contact with others, the merging of the self into a harmonious human collectivity.

In awarding the Nobel Prize for Literature to Mahfouz, the Swedish Academy of Letters noted that "through works rich in nuance -- now clearsight only realistic, now evocatively ambiguous -- [Mahfouz] has formed an Arabic narrative art that applies to all mankind."

== Literature review ==
According to John C. Hawley, “In the progression of his many books, Mahfouz’s faith in rationalism gradually softens, and he portrays the everlasting hunger for God (lying beneath the tendency toward grasping false gods)”. Likewise, the unnamed protagonist's desperate quest for Sheikh Zaabalawi is an allegory of modern man's futile search for God within a corrupt world where humanity has surrendered to materialism long ago. Rasheed El-Enany's definition of Mahfouz's attitude towards religion and God reads as follows: “... the totality of [Mahfouz’s] work appears to communicate a rejection of all forms of institutionalised religion while retaining belief in the abstract idea of God-a version of deism”. Indeed, the scene depicting the protagonist's inquiry of the bookseller in front of the Birgawi Residence where Zaabalawi once lived confirmed El-Enany's idea in that the deserted building now looks like a wasteland, occupied only by heaps of rubbish. In Mahfuzian terms the ruined residence stands for the present plight of modern man left without shelter, forsaken by God. As El-Enany states: “In Mahfouz’s world picture, the tug-of-war between man and God is an ongoing game. God is gladly fled from, but no sooner this is done than He is again madly sought after. It is a love-hate relationship,” where neither party could give up on the other.
