= Mirrors (novel) =

1972 novel by Naguib Mahfouz

- Edition from 1999 by The American University in Cairo Press
- Author: Naguib Mahfouz
- Translator: Roger Allen
- Language: Arabic/English (Translation)
- Genre: Literary fiction
- Publisher: Egyptian Publishing House and Distribution
- Publication date: 1972
- Publication place: Cairo, Egypt

Mirrors (Al-Maraya) is Naguib Mahfouz's 1972 novel. In it, Mahfouz creates portraits of the characters. The novel does not parallel the traditional Arabic novel, for it focuses on the characters instead of the plot in an attempt to create artistic images of people who were actual contemporaries of Mahfouz. He does this by shedding the light on the secretive and known aspects of the characters' lives and closely connecting them to the plot and the plot's effect on their lives. Additionally, Mahfouz incorporates his own opinions on these characters and the political eras they lived through.

== Summary ==
The novel includes sketches of fifty-five characters. The reader initially thinks that they are all fictional; however, after closely reading they realize that they are all real characters stripped off their names and appearances. Most of these characters were contemporaries of Mahfouz. The characters include:

- The professor, embodying the thinker who does not belong to any cause or anyone other than himself, the other character contradicts the first character in that it is the thinker who remains principled with time, no matter the hardships he faces.
- The thug, who relies on violence
- The nationalist, who grieves over the failure of the delegation with the departure of Makram Ebeid and Al-Naqrashi from the party
- The student, who was martyred in Cairo's streets defending Egypt's 1923 constitution, which was discontinued by Ismaʿil Ṣidqi
- The imprudent woman, who cheats on her husband with his friend
- The woman searching for true love, despite being in her seventies with a husband and children
- The revolutionary, who's a member of the Free Officers Movement
- The thinker, who died fighting police officers whilst getting arrested, whose legend persists after his death
- The sex-obsessed woman
- The tough communist, who only knows honesty and rigidness
- The beautiful communist plastic artist
- The trader, who only trades in what is forbidden
- The pious religious character

The fifty-five characters combine to form an elaborate portrait of Egyptian society.

== On the novel ==
Many critics believe that the importance of Mahfouz's Mirrors lies in the way it presents and critiques the "Thinkers" in Egypt, which was one of the most important social classes in Egypt during the 20th century.

Mahfouz's works, in general, and Mirrors, in particular, led to the development of what is known as 'adab al-talsin (or "gossip literature"), a term coined by the critic Faruq Abdelkadir to describe a literary style used by authors to settle personal matters with their enemies. Mirrors is a clear example of this type of writing.

The novel offered an account of the Egyptian army officers after they took over the government and showed how they experienced a shift to bourgeois values and practices.
