= The Beggar (novella) =

1965 novella by Nagieb Mahfoez

- Author: Naguib Mahfouz
- Original title: الشحاذ
- Language: Arabic
- Genre: Novella
- Publisher: Anchor Books (eng. trans.)
- Publication date: 1965
- Publication place: Egypt
- Media type: Print (Paperback)
- ISBN: 0-385-49835-7 (eng. trans.)
- OCLC: 44132962
- Dewey Decimal: 892.7/36 21
- LC Class: PJ7846.A46 A2 2000

The Beggar is a 1965 novella by Naguib Mahfouz about the failure to find meaning in existence. It is set in post-revolutionary Cairo during the time of Gamal Abdel Nasser.

== Plot summary ==
The book opens with the main character Omar going to visit a doctor, who was one of his friends from his youth, because he has become sick of life. The doctor tells him that there is nothing physically wrong with him, and tells him that he won’t be ill if he goes on a diet and takes regular exercise. Both the diet and a vacation make no difference to him though.

In his youth Omar was a poet and a socialist. He gave up both in order to become a lawyer, and now that he has reached the age of forty-five he can no longer find meaning in his life and he has effectively given up working. He met his wife Zeinab in his youth. She was a Christian called Kamelia Fouad and she converted to Islam, and lost her family in order to marry him. He promised that he would never desert her. She took up the role of supporting him and has proved to be the backbone of their middle-class existence together. As his malady grows he becomes more distant from her.

He tries to escape his condition through love. He first meets a foreign singer called Margaret. When she unexpectedly leaves Egypt, he gets together with an oriental dancer called Warda. He falls in love with her, and she with him and they set up home together. Initially Omar’s illness seems to pass in the excitement of love. Zeinab, who is pregnant, is first suspicious and then is told of his new lover. Omar moves out to be with Warda, who quits her job to be with him. This love however fails to lift him out of his illness for long, and he makes contact with Margaret again when he sees her back at her club. He then goes through a succession of women, including prostitutes, trying to pull himself out of his sickness, but it is all to no avail.

One dawn he is out near the pyramids and he feels a momentary joy, which connects him to all life. He feels light and at peace, but he soon feels the illness again. Although he tries to win this feeling again he is never able to.

He returns home but feels suffocated there. One day Othman Khalil turns up in his office. Othman had been his socialist comrade in his youth who had been caught by the police, but hadn’t given out his connections with Omar, despite having been tortured. He has only just been released from prison. Othman is disconcerted to find Omar as a sceptic, as he has hung onto all of his socialist orthodoxies.

As writing poetry has also failed to cure him, in an attempt to regain the peace he felt by the pyramids, Omar goes off to live by himself in the countryside. He slips into delirium but still the calm he desires escapes him. After a year and a half Othman, who has got involved in politics again, turns up at the house escaping from the police, but Omar thinks he is an illusion. Omar is shot and wounded as the police catch Othman. Omar feels he is returning to the world as he is brought back to Cairo.
