= Stories from Our Neighbourhood =

1975 collection by Naguib Mahfouz

Stories from our neighbourhood (Arabic title حكايات حارتنا), also known as Fountain and Tomb, is a collection of stories by the Egyptian author Naguib Mahfouz, who was awarded the Nobel Prize in Literature in 1988. The collection, published in 1975, takes place in Cairo in the 1920s, and consist of 77 autobiographical stories during the social unrest occurring in the country at the time.
