= Wedding Song (novel) =

1981 Arabic-language novel

Wedding song
- Author: Naguib Mahfouz
- Language: English
- Genre: Literary fiction
- Publisher: Doubleday; 1st Doubleday ed edition
- Publication date: September 20, 1989
- Pages: 174
- ISBN: 978-0385264631

Wedding Song (أفراح القبة Afrāh al-Qubba) also known as joys of the dome is a 1981 Arabic-language novel by Naguib Mahfouz. In the novel the narrator tells and retells the story of a marriage from the very different perspectives of the main characters, deepening the reader's understanding of “what happened in the end we read the true story by the main narrator (the husband)." In ramadan of 2016 there was an Egyptian TV series with same name.
