= Children of Gebelawi =

1959 novel by Naguib Mahfouz

Children of our alley
- First English-language edition
- Author: Naguib Mahfouz
- Original title: أولاد حارتنا
- Translator: Philip Stewart 1981; Peter Theroux 1996
- Language: Arabic
- Genre: Novel
- Published: 1959 (translation 13 April 1981)
- Publisher: Heinemann (1981)
- Publication place: Egypt
- Media type: Print (paperback)
- Pages: 355 p. (paperback edition)
- ISBN: 0-435-90225-3 (paperback edition)

Children of Gebelawi (Arabic: أولاد حارتنا, romanized: ʾawlād ḥāratnā) is a novel by the Egyptian writer and Nobel laureate Naguib Mahfouz. Its Egyptian dialectal transliteration is Awlad Haretna. An alternative English title is Children of the Alley.

== Controversy ==
Originally published in Arabic in 1959 in serialised form in the daily newspaper Al-Ahram, it was met with severe opposition from religious authorities, and was only released uncut in its entirety because of the intervention of president Gamal Abdel Nasser, who was a friend of Al-Ahram's editor, Mohammed Heikal. Publication in the form of a book was banned in Egypt.

It was first printed in Lebanon in 1967. An English translation by Philip Stewart was published in 1981 and is no longer in print; the American University of Cairo had controlled the world rights since 1976 and had licensed Heinemann Educational Books to publish Stewart's version, but Heinemann sold back its rights a few weeks before Mahfouz was awarded the Nobel Prize in Literature. Three Continents Press still had license to publish in the American market, and Stewart wanted to continue publishing quietly in America and to avoid a world-wide relaunch of such a controversial book, but when he refused to sell his copyright, American University of Cairo commissioned a new version by Peter Theroux for Doubleday.

It was this book that earned Naguib Mahfouz condemnation from Omar Abdel-Rahman in 1989, who called on him to repent or be killed. Abdel-Rahman also claimed that "If this sentence had been passed on Naguib Mahfouz when he wrote Children of the Alley, Salman Rushdie would have realized that he had to stay within bounds". In 1994 – a day after the anniversary of the prize – Mahfouz was attacked and stabbed in the neck by two extremists outside his Cairo home. Mahfouz survived the attack, yet he suffered from its consequences until his death in 2006.

Four months after Mahfouz's death, the book was officially released in Egypt, where it became a best seller.

== Synopsis ==
The story recreates the interlinked history of the three monotheistic Abrahamic religions (Judaism, Christianity, and Islam), allegorised against the setting of an imaginary 19th century Cairene alley.

Critics claimed that Gebelawi stands for God. Mahfouz rejected this, telling the English translator of Children of Gebelawi (Philip J. Stewart) in 1962 that he stood for "a certain idea of God that men have made" and that "Nothing can represent God. God is not like anything else. God is gigantic."

The first four sections retell, in succession, the stories of: Adam (Adham أدهم) and how he was favoured by Gabalawi over the latter's other sons, including the eldest Satan/Iblis (Idris إدريس). In subsequent generations the heroes relive the lives of Moses (Gabal جبل), Jesus (Rifa'a رفاعة) and Muhammad (Qasim قاسم). The followers of each hero settle in different parts of the alley, symbolising Judaism, Christianity and Islam. Mahfouz writes"Good examples would not be wasted on our alley were it not afflicted with forgetfulness, But forgetfulness is the plague of our alley."

The protagonist of the book's fifth section is Arafa (عرفة), who symbolises modern science and comes after the prophets, while all of their followers claim Arafa as one of them(كواحد منهم).

Central to the plot are the futuwwat (strongmen) who control the alley and exact protection money from the people. The successive heroes overthrow the strongmen of their time, but in the next generation new strongmen spring up and things are as bad as ever. Arafa tries to use his knowledge of explosives to destroy the strongmen, but his attempts to discover Gabalawi's secrets leads to the death of the old man (though he does not directly kill him). The Chief Strongman guesses the truth and blackmails Arafa into helping him to become the dictator of the whole Alley. The book ends, after the murder of Arafa, with his friend searching in a rubbish tip for the book in which Arafa wrote his secrets. The people say "Oppression must cease as night yields to day. We shall see the end of tyranny and the dawn of miracles."

== Reviews and interpretations ==
The book version of the material reflects the Middle Eastern story telling tradition dating back to One Thousand and One Nights. Mahfouz later published a book, Arabian Nights and Days: a Novel, that is based on characters derived from One Thousand and One Nights. Mahfouz uses the novel form in this work rather than the story form more common in Middle Eastern writing. He read Western literature widely and is considered one of the writers responsible for introducing the novel form in the Middle East.

Children of the Alley is a collection of novellas that originated as a newspaper serial. The protagonists vary, and the villains are variations on a theme. Mahfouz reflects on the Egyptian experience of hope in a new leader that is then dashed. None of the heroes succeed in improving the plight of their people for more than a brief period of time.

The book is pessimistic but as David Frum has pointed out ends on a positive note: "Yet the people bore the outrages steadfastly, taking refuge in patience. They held fast to hope, and whenever they were persecuted, they said, “Injustice must have an end, as day follows night. We will see the death of tyranny, and the dawn of light and miracles.”

In a New York Times review, the reviewer suggests that the book represents "man's attempt to puzzle out the mysteriousness of God and His seeming indifference to human suffering". But the most conspicuous theme is the uphill struggle of the good against the wicked and the corrupt.

The book is heavily influenced by Arab political experience and by a lifetime spent in Cairo. Mafouz grew up in a lower middle class, devout Muslim family in Old Cairo with its medieval alleys and Coptic and Muslim alleys. Children of the Alley is set in the alleys of Old Cairo. Its portraits of leaders reflects the political history of Egypt during Mahfouz's lifetime.

== Editions ==
- 1981, UK, Heinemann, 1981, paperback (as Children of Gebelawi - Stewart's translation) ISBN 0-435-99415-8.
- 1988, U.S., Three Continents Press, 1981, paperback (as Children of Gebelawi - Stewart's translation) ISBN 0-89410-654-6.
- 1990, Israel, Am Oved, Hebrew translation by David Sagiv as Children of Our Neighborhood בני שכונתנו, end notes by Sasson Somekh.
- 1996, U.S., Doubleday, 1996, hardback (as Children of the Alley - Theroux's translation) ISBN 0-385-42094-3.
- 1997, U.S., Passeggata Press, 1997, paperback (as Children of Gebelaawi - Stewart's version revised) ISBN 0-89410-818-2.
