= Arabian Nights and Days =

1982 novel by Naguib Mahfouz

- Early Arabian edition
- Author: Naguib Mahfouz
- Original title: ليالي ألف ليلة
- Translator: Denys Johnson-Davies
- Language: Arabic
- Genre: Novel
- Publisher: Doubleday (English)
- Publication date: 1982 (Arabic version)
- Publication place: Egypt
- English publication date: 1995
- Media type: Print (Hardback & Paperback)
- Pages: 227 pp (first Eng. edition, hardback)
- ISBN: 978-0-385-46888-6 (first Eng. edition, hardback)

Arabian Nights and Days is a 1982 novel by Egyptian writer Naguib Mahfouz, winner of the Nobel Prize for Literature. The novel serves as a sequel and companion piece for One Thousand and One Nights and includes many of the same characters that appeared in the original work such as Shahryar, Scheherazade, and Aladdin.
