= Midaq Alley (novel) =

1947 novel by Naguib Mahfouz

- First English edition
- Author: Naguib Mahfouz
- Original title: زقاق المدق
- Translator: Trevor Le Gassick
- Language: Arabic
- Publisher: Khayats, Beirut (1966)
- Publication date: 1947
- Publication place: Egypt
- English publication date: 1966
- Media type: Print (Hardback)
- Pages: 286 pp
- OCLC: 438354830
- Dewey Decimal: 892/.736 20
- LC Class: PJ7846.A46 Z4813 1992

Midaq Alley (Arabic: زقاق المدق, romanized: Zuqāq al-Midaqq) is a 1947 novel by Egyptian author Naguib Mahfouz, first published in English in 1966. The story is about Midaq Alley in Khan el-Khalili, a teeming back street in Cairo which is presented as a microcosm of the world.

== Plot introduction ==
Mahfouz plays on the cultural setting. The novel is introduced with description of the Arab culture. It centers around the list of characters described below. The novel takes place in the 1940s and represents standing on the threshold of a modern era in Cairo and the rest of the nation as a whole.

== Characters ==
Each character is expressed like a caricature in which one quality or trait is over-emphasized. Mahfouz is not satirizing the individual character – he is satirizing the character type.

- Kirsha, a café owner who illegally sells and uses hashish and has a predilection for young boys
- Mrs. Kirsha, infamous for her temper
- Uncle Kamil, good-hearted, bachelor sweets-seller, famously bloated and sleepy
- Abbas, a young, kindly barber who wants to get married, joins the British army to make money to be able to marry Hamida.
- Salim Alwan, the lustful, wealthy businessman who competes with Abbas for the love of Hamida. After surviving a heart attack, he becomes embittered, preventing him from marrying Hamida
- Dr. Booshy, the self-proclaimed dentist who sells false teeth at dirt-cheap prices by stealing them off dead bodies
- Sanker, the waiter at Kirsha's café
- Sheikh Darwish, the old poet and former English teacher, who left his former life to roam the streets.
- Radwan Hussainy, a landlord who beats his wife and failed his al-Azhar exams, yet is revered for his high degree of education, generosity, and devotion to God. He has lost all of his children.
- Hussain Kirsha, son of the café owner who works for the British. He marries a woman of lower class and returns home with her and her brother.
- Saniya Afify, widowed landlady who desires to remarry. Umm Hamida sets her up with a younger man named Ahmed Effendi Talbat
- Umm Hamida, the neighborhood matchmaker and bath attendant; Hamida's foster mother
- Hamida, a beautiful young woman who dreams of a better life and has a distinctly self-centered personality, but is easily persuaded by wealth or power.
- Husniya, the bakeress who beats her husband with her slipper
- Jaada, Husniya's husband
- Zaita, the cripple maker who lives outside the bakery and aids Dr. Booshy in his theft of false teeth.
- Ibrahim Farhat, a politician
- Ibrahim Faraj, a pimp who tries to seduce Hamida into working for him
- The Poet, who is replaced by a radio and is barred by Kirsha (only appears in the first chapter)

== See also ==
- Naguib Mahfouz
- El callejón de los milagros (a 1995 Mexican film based on the novel)
- Nobel Prize in Literature
