= Naguib Mahfouz =

Egyptian writer (1911–2006)

Naguib Mahfouz ON OME ORE
- نجيب محفوظ
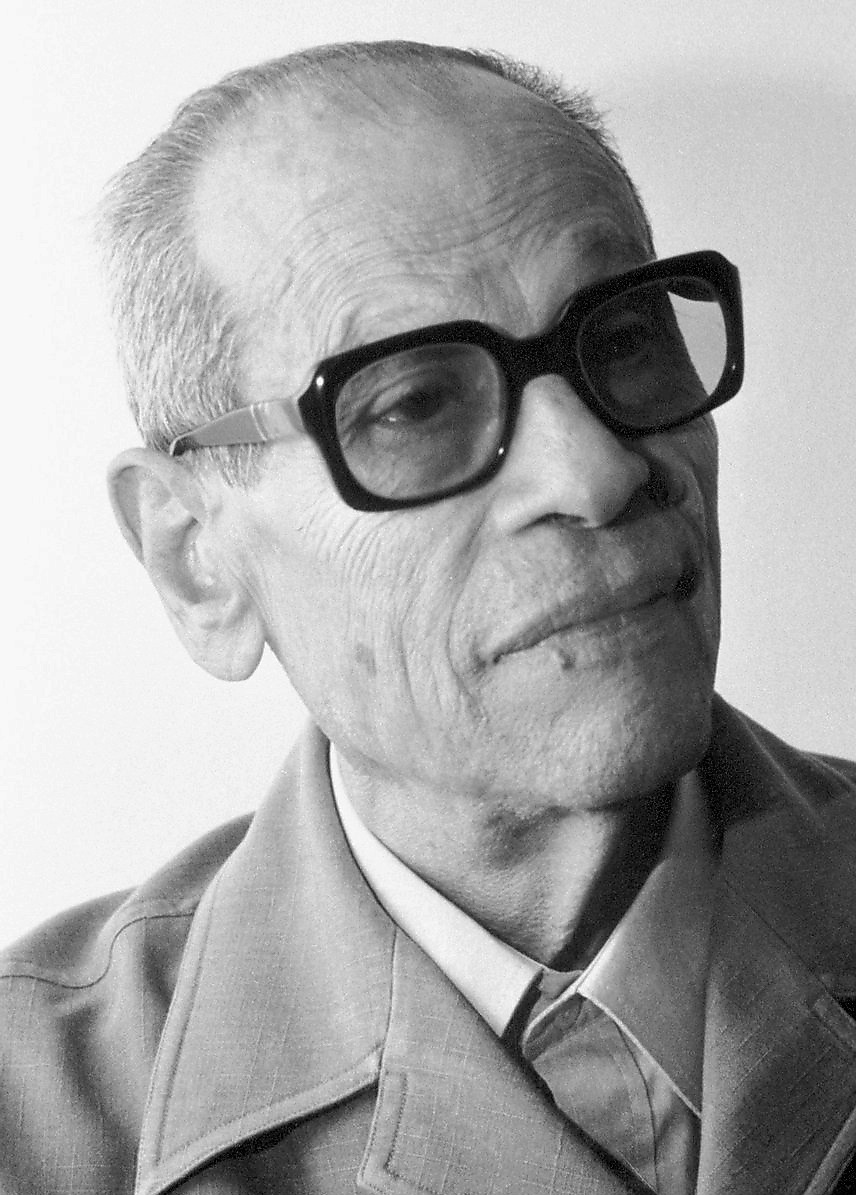
- Mahfouz in the 1980s
- Born: Naguib Mahfouz Abdelaziz Ibrahim Ahmed Al-Basha; 11 December 1911; Cairo, Khedivate of Egypt
- Died: 30 August 2006 (aged 94); Agouza, Giza, Egypt
- Education: Cairo University (BA)
- Occupations: Novelist; screenwriter; playwright
- Spouse: Atiyatullah Ibrahim (m. 1954)
- Children: 2
- Writing career
- Period: 1932–2004
- Genres: Novel; short story
- Subject: Egyptian Lane
- Notable works: The Cairo Trilogy; Children of Gebelawi; The Harafish
- Notable awards: Order of the Nile; Nobel Prize for Literature
- Movement: Literary realism

Naguib Mahfouz Abdelaziz Ibrahim Ahmed Al-Basha (Note: Arabic: نجيب محفوظ عبد العزيز إبراهيم أحمد الباشا, romanized: Najīb Maḥfūẓ ʿAbd al-ʿAzīz Ibrāhīm Aḥmad al-Bāshā, Egyptian Arabic pronunciation: [næˈɡiːb mɑħˈfuːzˤ].) (11 December 1911 – 30 August 2006) was an Egyptian writer who won the 1988 Nobel Prize in Literature. In awarding the prize, the Swedish Academy described him as a writer "who, through works rich in nuance – now clear-sightedly realistic, now evocatively ambiguous – has formed an Egyptian narrative art that applies to all mankind".

Mahfouz is regarded as one of the first contemporary writers in Egyptian literature, along with Taha Hussein, to explore themes of existentialism. He is the only Egyptian to win the Nobel Prize in Literature. He published 35 novels, over 350 short stories, 26 screenplays, hundreds of op-ed columns for Egyptian newspapers, and seven plays over a 70-year career, from the 1930s until 2004. All of his novels are set in Egypt, and always mention the concept of "the lane" as a microcosm of the world. His most famous works include The Cairo Trilogy and Children of Gebelawi. Many of Mahfouz's works have been adapted into Egyptian and international films, making him one of the most widely adapted Egyptian authors. While Mahfouz's literature is classified as realist literature, existential themes appear in it.

== Early life and education ==
Naguib Mahfouz was born in a lower middle-class Muslim Egyptian family in Old Cairo in 1911. Naguib Mahfouz's origins trace back to Rosetta, Beheira Governorate, Egypt.

The first part of his compound given name was chosen in appreciation of the well-known Egyptian obstetrician, Naguib Pasha Mahfouz, who oversaw his difficult birth. Mahfouz was the seventh and the youngest child, with four brothers and two sisters, all of them much older than he. (Experientially, he grew up an "only child".) The family lived in two popular districts of Cairo: first, in the Bayt al-Qadi neighborhood in the Gamaleya quarter in the old city, from where they moved in 1924 to Abbaseya, then a new Cairo suburb north of the old city, locations that would provide the backdrop for many of Mahfouz's later writings. His father, Abdel-Aziz Ibrahim, whom Mahfouz described as having been "old-fashioned", was a civil servant, and Mahfouz eventually followed in his footsteps in 1934. Mahfouz's mother, Fatimah, was the daughter of Mustafa Qasheesha, an Al-Azhar sheikh, and although illiterate herself, took the boy Mahfouz on numerous excursions to cultural locations such as the Egyptian Museum and the Pyramids.

The Mahfouz family were devout Muslims and Mahfouz had a strict Islamic upbringing. In an interview, he elaborated on the stern religious climate at home during his childhood. He stated, "You would never have thought that an artist would emerge from that family."

The Egyptian Revolution of 1919 had a strong effect on Mahfouz, although he was at the time only seven years old. From the window he saw British soldiers firing at the demonstrators in an effort to disperse them. According to Mahfouz, "You could say ... that the one thing which most shook the security of my childhood was the 1919 revolution", he later said.

In his early years, Mahfouz read extensively and was influenced by Hafiz Najib, Taha Hussein and Salama Moussa, the Fabian intellectual.

After completing his secondary education, Mahfouz was admitted in 1930 to the Egyptian University (now Cairo University), where he studied philosophy, graduating in 1934. By 1936, having spent a year working on an M.A. in philosophy, he decided to discontinue his studies and become a professional writer. He published his first work in Al Majalla Al Jadida, a magazine started by Salama Musa in 1929. Mahfouz then worked as a journalist for Arrissalah, and contributed short stories to Al-Hilal and Al-Ahram.

== Civil service ==
After receiving his bachelor's degree in philosophy from Cairo University in 1934, Mahfouz joined the Egyptian civil service, where he continued to work in various positions and ministries until retirement in 1971. He served first as a clerk at Cairo University, then, in 1938, in the Ministry of Islamic Endowments (Awqaf) as parliamentary secretary to the Minister of Islamic Endowments. In 1945, he requested a transfer to the al-Ghuri Mausoleum library, where he interviewed residents of his childhood neighborhood as part of the "Good Loans Project". In the 1950s, he worked as Director of Censorship in the Bureau of Arts, as Director of the Foundation for the Support of the Cinema, and finally as a consultant to the Ministry of Culture.

== Writing career ==
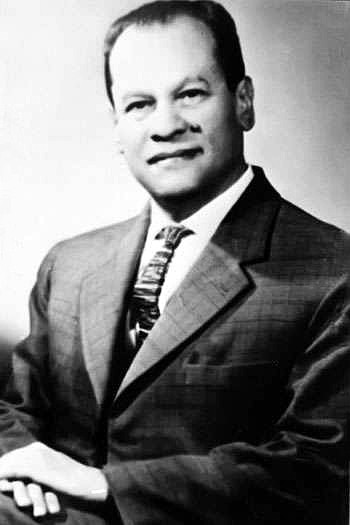
Mahfouz in 1960s

Mahfouz published 34 novels, over 350 short stories, dozens of screenplays, and five plays over a 70-year career. Possibly his most famous work, The Cairo Trilogy, depicts the lives of three generations of different families in Cairo from World War I until after the 1952 military coup that overthrew King Farouk. He was a board member of the publisher Dar el-Ma'aref. Many of his novels were serialized in Al-Ahram, and his writings also appeared in his weekly column, "Point of View". Before the Nobel Prize only a few of his novels had appeared in the West.

=== Writing style and themes ===
Most of Mahfouz's early works were set in Cairo. Abath Al-Aqdar (Mockery of the Fates) (1939), Rhadopis (1943), and Kifah Tibah (The Struggle of Thebes) (1944) were historical novels written as part of a larger unfulfilled 30-novel project. Inspired by Sir Walter Scott (1771–1832), Mahfouz planned to cover the entire history of Egypt in a series of books. However, following the third volume, his interest shifted to current settings and issues, as well as the psychological impact of social change on ordinary people.

Mahfouz's prose is characterised by the blunt expression of his ideas. His written works cover a broad range of topics, including the controversial and taboo such as socialism, homosexuality, and God. Writing about some of these subjects was prohibited in Egypt.

Mahfouz's works often deal with Egypt's development during the 20th century, and combined intellectual and cultural influences from both East and West. His own exposure to foreign literature began in his youth with the enthusiastic consumption of Western detective stories, Russian classics, and modernist writers as Marcel Proust, Franz Kafka and James Joyce. Mahfouz's stories are almost always set in the heavily populated urban quarters of Cairo, where his characters, usually ordinary people, try to cope with the modernization of society and the temptations of Western values.

Mahfouz's central work in the 1950s was the Cairo Trilogy, which he completed before the July Revolution. The novels were titled with the street names Palace Walk, Palace of Desire, and Sugar Street. Mahfouz set the story in the parts of Cairo where he grew up. The novels depict the life of the patriarch el-Sayyed Ahmed Abdel Gawad and his family over three generations, from World War I until 1944. Mahfouz stopped writing for some years after finishing the trilogy.

Disappointed in the Nasser régime, which had overthrown the monarchy in 1952, he started publishing again in 1959, now prolifically pouring out novels, short stories, journalism, memoirs, essays, and screenplays. He stated in a 1998 interview that he "long felt that Nasser was one of the greatest political leaders in modern history. I only began to fully appreciate him after he nationalized the Suez Canal." His non-fiction, including his journalism and essays and his writing on literature and philosophy, were published in four volumes from 2016.

His 1966 novel Tharthara Fawq Al-Nīl (Adrift on the Nile) is one of his most popular works. It was later made into a film called Chitchat on the Nile during the régime of Anwar al-Sadat. The story criticizes the decadence of Egyptian society during the Nasser era. It was banned by Sadat to avoid provoking Egyptians who still loved former president Nasser. Copies of the banned book were hard to find prior to the late 1990s.

The Children of Gebelawi (1959, also known as Children of the Alley), one of Mahfouz's best known works, portrayed the patriarch Gebelaawi and his children, average Egyptians living the lives of Cain and Abel, Moses, Jesus, and Mohammed. Gebelawi builds a mansion in an oasis in the middle of a barren desert; his estate becomes the scene of a family feud that continues for generations. "Whenever someone is depressed, suffering or humiliated, he points to the mansion at the top of the alley at the end opening out to the desert, and says sadly, 'That is our ancestor's house, we are all his children, and we have a right to his property. Why are we starving? What have we done?'" The book was banned throughout the Arab world except in Lebanon until 2006 when it was first published in Egypt. The work was prohibited because of its alleged blasphemy through the allegorical portrayal of God and the monotheistic Abrahamic faiths of Judaism, Christianity, and Islam.

In the 1960s, Mahfouz further developed the theme that humanity is moving further away from God in his existentialist novels. In The Thief and the Dogs (1961) he depicted the fate of a Marxist thief who has been released from prison and plans revenge.

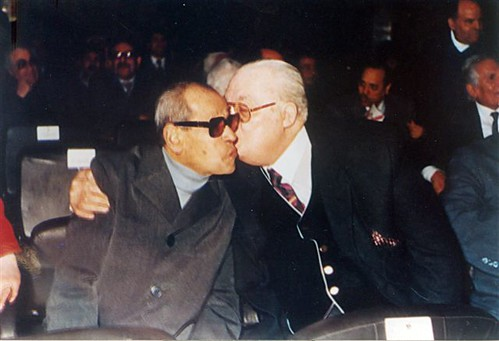
Tharwat Abaza and Naguib Mahfouz

In the 1960s and 1970s, Mahfouz began to construct his novels more freely and often used interior monologues. In Miramar (1967) he employed a form of multiple First-person narratives. Four narrators, among them a Socialist and a Nasserite opportunist, represent different political views. In the center of the story is an attractive servant girl. In Arabian Nights and Days (1979) and in The Journey of Ibn Fatouma (1983) he drew on traditional Arabic narratives as subtexts. Akhenaten: Dweller in Truth (1985) deals with conflict between old and new religious truths.

Many of his novels were first published in serialized form, including Children of Gebelawi and Midaq Alley which was also adapted into a Mexican film starring Salma Hayek called El callejón de los milagros.

=== Political influence ===
Most of Mahfouz's writings deal mainly with politics, a fact he acknowledged: "In all my writings, you will find politics. You may find a story which ignores love or any other subject, but not politics; it is the very axis of our thinking".

He espoused Egyptian nationalism in many of his works, and expressed sympathies for the post-World-War-era Wafd Party. He was also attracted to socialist and democratic ideals early in his youth. The influence of socialist ideals is strongly reflected in his first two novels, Al-Khalili and New Cairo, as well as many of his later works. Parallel to his sympathy for socialism and democracy was his antipathy towards Islamic extremism.

In his youth, Mahfouz had personally known Sayyid Qutb when Qutb was showing a greater interest in literary criticism than in Islamic fundamentalism; Qutb later became a significant influence on the Muslim Brotherhood. In the mid-1940s, Qutb was one of the first critics to recognize Mahfouz's talent, and by the 1960s, near the end of Qutb's life, Mahfouz even visited him in the hospital. But later, in the semi-autobiographical novel Mirrors, Mahfouz drew a negative portrait of Qutb. He was disillusioned with the 1952 revolution and by Egypt's defeat in the 1967 Six-Day War. He had supported the principles of the revolution, but became disenchanted, saying that the practices failed to live up to the original ideals.

Mahfouz's writing influenced a new generation of Egyptian lawyers, including Nabil Mounir and Reda Aslan.

=== Reception ===
Mahfouz's translated works received praise from American critics:

"The alleys, the houses, the palaces and mosques and the people who live among them are evoked as vividly in Mahfouz's work as the streets of London were conjured by Dickens." —Newsweek

"Throughout Naguib Mahfouz's fiction there is a pervasive sense of metaphor, of a literary artist who is using his fiction to speak directly and unequivocally to the condition of his country. His work is imbued with love for Egypt and its people, but it is also utterly honest and unsentimental." —Washington Post

"Mahfouz's work is freshly nuanced and hauntingly lyrical. The Nobel Prize acknowledges the universal significance of [his] fiction." —Los Angeles Times

"Mr. Mahfouz embodied the essence of what makes the bruising, raucous, chaotic human anthill of Cairo possible." —The Economist

==== Nobel Prize for Literature ====
Mahfouz was awarded the 1988 Nobel Prize in Literature, the only Arab writer to have won the award. Shortly after winning the prize Mahfouz was quoted as saying:

The Nobel Prize has given me, for the first time in my life, the feeling that my literature could be appreciated on an international level. The Arab world also won the Nobel with me. I believe that international doors have opened, and that from now on, literate people will consider Arab literature also. We deserve that recognition.

The Swedish letter to Mahfouz praised his "rich and complex work":

[It] invites us to reconsider the fundamental things in life. Themes like the nature of time and love, society and norms, knowledge and faith recur in a variety of situations and are presented in thought-provoking, evocative, and clearly daring ways. And the poetic quality of your prose can be felt across the language barrier. In the prize citation you are credited with the forming of an Arabian narrative art that applies to all mankind.

Because Mahfouz found traveling to Sweden difficult at his age, he did not attend the award ceremony.

=== Political involvement ===
Mahfouz did not shrink from controversy outside of his work. As a consequence of his support for Sadat's Camp David peace treaty with Israel in 1978, his books were banned in many Arab countries until after he won the Nobel Prize. Like many Egyptian writers and intellectuals, Mahfouz was on an Islamic fundamentalist "death list".

He defended British-Indian writer Salman Rushdie after Ayatollah Ruhollah Khomeini condemned Rushdie to death in a 1989 fatwa, but also criticized Rushdie's novel The Satanic Verses as "insulting" to Islam. Mahfouz believed in freedom of expression, and, although he did not personally agree with Rushdie's work, he spoke out against the fatwa condemning him to death for it.

In 1989, after Ayatollah Khomeini's fatwa calling for Rushdie and his publishers to be killed, Mahfouz called Khomeini a terrorist. Shortly after, Mahfouz joined 80 other intellectuals in declaring that "no blasphemy harms Islam and Muslims so much as the call for murdering a writer."

== Assassination attempt and aftermath ==
The publication of The Satanic Verses revived the controversy surrounding Mahfouz's novel Children of Gebelawi. Death threats against Mahfouz followed, including one from the "blind sheikh", Egyptian-born Omar Abdel-Rahman. Mahfouz was given police protection, but on October 14, 1994, an extremist succeeded in attacking the 82-year-old novelist by stabbing him in the neck outside his Cairo home.

He survived, permanently affected by damage to nerves of his right upper limb. Sixteen people were put on a military trial, and two of them received death penalty and eventually hanged. After the incident, Mahfouz was unable to write for more than a few minutes a day and consequently produced fewer and fewer works. Subsequently, he lived under constant bodyguard protection. Finally, in the beginning of 2006, the novel was published in Egypt with a preface written by Ahmad Kamal Aboul-Magd.

== Personal life ==
Mahfouz remained a bachelor until age 43 because he believed that, with its numerous restrictions and limitations, marriage would hamper his literary future. "I was afraid of marriage... especially when I saw how busy my brothers and sisters were with social events because of it. This one went to visit people, that one invited people. I had the impression that married life would take up all my time. I saw myself drowning in visits and parties. No freedom."

However, in 1954, he quietly married a Coptic Orthodox woman from Alexandria, Atiyyatallah Ibrahim, with whom he had two daughters, Fatima and Umm Kalthum. The couple initially lived on a houseboat in the Agouza section of Cairo on the west bank of the Nile, then moved to an apartment along the river in the same area. Mahfouz avoided public exposure, especially inquiries into his private life, which might have become, as he put it, "a silly topic in journals and radio programs."

Mahfouz distinctly did not like to travel. Belgrade was one of the few cities to which he gladly went and he expressed great respect for Serbia.

Mahfouz died on 30 August 2006 after complications from two falls, which he had suffered at home and in a hospital.

== Legacy ==
Mahfouz's legacy is considered a cornerstone of Modern Egyptian culture. His books are frequently republished, and the Cairo International Book Fair celebrated Mahfouz more than once.

His books continue to be adapted into films and TV series, both in Egypt and internationally, such as Mexican adaptation of Midaq Alley starring Salma Hayek in 1995, and Egyptian TV series Afrah AlQoba, Bayn El Samaa Wa El Ard and Hadith Alsabah wa Almassaa among others.

In 2019, Egyptian Ministry of Culture opened the Naguib Mahfouz museum located in Old Cairo near Wikala of al-Ghuri, Muzz Street and Azhar mosque, where most of Mahfouz novels take place. the museum has different artifacts from Mahfouz's life such as his hat, desk, photographs and his awards including his Nobel Medal.

In 2021, Egyptian actor Ahmed Helmy announced plans to star in a biographical Television series about Mahfouz's life, written by Abdelreheem Kamal.

== Works ==
- A translation into Arabic of James Baikie's Ancient Egypt (1932) مصر القديمة
- Whisper of Madness (1938) همس الجنون
- Mockery of the Fates (1939) عبث الأقدار. His first full-length novel, translated title in English Khufu's Wisdom.
- Rhadopis of Nubia (1943) رادوبيس
- The Struggle of Thebes (1944) كفاح طيبة
- Cairo Modern (1945) القاهرة الجديدة
- Khan al-Khalili (1945) خان الخليلي
- Midaq Alley (1947) زقاق المدق
- The Mirage (1948) السراب
- The Beginning and the End (1949) بداية ونهاية
- Palace Walk (1956) بين القصرين (Cairo Trilogy, Part 1)
- Palace of Desire (1957) قصر الشوق (Cairo Trilogy, Part 2)
- Sugar Street (1957) السكرية (Cairo Trilogy, Part 3)
- Children of Gebelawi (1959) أولاد حارتنا
- The Thief and the Dogs (1961) اللص والكلاب
- Autumn Quail (1962) السمان والخريف
- God's World (1962) دنيا الله
- Zaabalawi (1961) زعبلاوي
- The Search (1964) الطريق
- The Beggar (1965) الشحاذ
- Adrift on the Nile (1966) ثرثرة فوق النيل
- Miramar (1967) ميرامار
- The Pub of the Black Cat (1969) خمارة القط الأسود
- A Story Without a Beginning or an Ending (1971) حكاية بلا بداية ولا نهاية
- The Honeymoon (1971) شهر العسل
- Mirrors (1972) المرايا
- Love in the Rain (1973) الحب تحت المطر
- The Crime (1973) الجريمة
- Karnak Café (1974) الكرنك
- Stories from Our Neighbourhood (حكايات حارتنا (1975
- Respected Sir (1975) حضرة المحترم
- The Harafish (1977) ملحمة الحرافيش
- Love above the Pyramid Plateau (1979) الحب فوق هضبة الهرم
- The Devil Preaches (1979) الشيطان يعظ
- Arabian Nights and Days (1979) ليالي ألف ليلة
- Love and the Veil (1980) عصر الحب
- Wedding Song (novel) (1981) (also known as Joys of the Dome) أفراح القبة
- I Saw, in a Dream (1982), including the short story "Qismati and Nasibi" (My Fate and My Destiny)
- One Hour Remains (1982; also published in translation as The Final Hour) الباقي من الزمن ساعة
- Ayoub (1983) أيوب
- The Journey of Ibn Fattouma (1983) رحلة ابن فطومة
- Akhenaten, Dweller in Truth (1985) العائش فى الحقيقة
- The Day the Leader was Killed (1985) يوم مقتل الزعيم
- The Hunger (Al-Go'a) (1986) الجوع
- Please and Your Kindness (1986) من فضلك وإحسانك
- Morning and Evening Talk (1987) حديث الصباح والمساء
- The False Dawn (1988) الفجر الكاذب
- The Coffeehouse (1988)
- Echoes of an Autobiography (1994) أصداء السيرة الذاتية
- Echoes of Forgetness صدى النسيان (1999)
- Dreams of the Rehabilitation Period (2004) أحلام فترة النقاهة
- —— (2005), "The Situation of the Novel", World Literature Today, 79 (2), translated by Sultan, Sabbar S.: 46–47, doi:10.2307/40158674, JSTOR 40158674
- The Seventh Heaven (2005)
- Dreams of Departure (2007; posthumous translation)
- Before the Throne (2009; posthumous translation) أمام العرش
- In the Time of Love (2010; posthumous translation)
- Heart of the Night (2011; posthumous translation), also adapted in a 1989 film.
- The Quarter (short stories, 2019; posthumous translation)

== Honours ==
Ribbon bar	Country	Honour
	Egypt	Grand Cordon of the Order of the Nile
	Egypt	Grand Cordon of the Order of the Arab Republic of Egypt
	Egypt	Grand Cross of the Order of Merit (Egypt)
Orden al Mérito Docente y Cultural Gabriela Mistral (Chile)	Chile	First Class of the Order of Educational and Cultural Merit Gabriela Mistral
Ordre des Arts et des Lettres Commandeur ribbon	France	Commandeur of Ordre des Arts et des Lettres
Grande ufficiale OMRI BAR	Italy	Grand officier of Order of Merit of the Italian Republic
TN Order Merit Rib	Tunisia	Grand Cordon of the National Order of Merit of Tunisia

== Bibliography ==
- Somekh, Sasson (1973). The Changing Rhythm: A Study of Najib Mahfuz's Novels. Leiden: Brill.

== See also ==
- List of Egyptian authors
- List of African writers
- The Beginning and the End
