= Sami Michael =

Iraqi-born Israeli author and human rights activist (1926–2024)

- סמי מיכאל
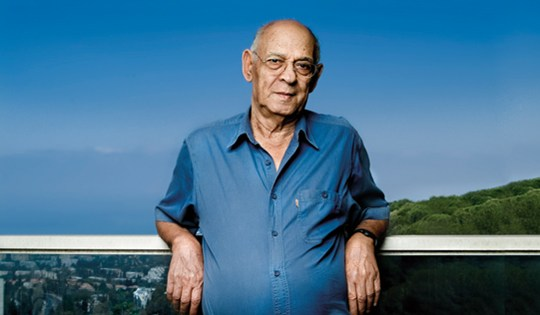
- Michael in 2007
- Born: Kamal Salah; 15 August 1926; Baghdad, Iraq
- Died: 1 April 2024 (aged 97); Haifa, Israel
- Citizenship: Israeli; Iraqi (till 1950)
- Occupations: Author; was President of The Association for Civil Rights in Israel (ACRI).
- Spouse: Rachel Yonah Michael
- Partner(s): Malka; Rachel Yona
- Children: Dikla; Amir
- Awards: 1992 Hans Christian Andersen Award; 2001 special prize by Society for International Development (SID), United Nations and Italian Association for the Promotion of Peace in the Middle East (AISI), Italy; 2004 Brenner Prize; 2005 The President and The Hebrew University Prize; 2007 EMET Prize; 2012 ACUM Lifetime Achievement Award for literature; Honorary doctorates from The Hebrew University, Ben Gurion University of the Negev, Tel Aviv University, University of Haifa

Sami Michael (Hebrew: סמי מיכאל, Arabic: سامي ميخائيل; 15 August 1926 – 1 April 2024) was an Iraqi-Israeli author, having migrated from Iraq to Israel at the age of 23. From 2001, Michael was the President of The Association for Civil Rights in Israel (ACRI).

Michael was among the first in Israel to call for the creation of an independent Palestinian state to exist alongside the state of Israel. In his novels, Michael writes about the aspirations and struggles of both Jews and Arabs. This new approach in modern Hebrew literature was controversial and has been widely discussed in academia and in the media. Michael was awarded the EMET Prize in 2007. Michael defined himself not as a Zionist, but as an Israeli in order to make room for the inclusion of all citizens in Israel.

== Background ==
Born as Kamal Salah, Sami Michael was the firstborn of a large, secular, Jewish family in Baghdad, where his father was a merchant. Michael grew up and was educated in a mixed neighborhood of Jews, Muslims, and Christians in Baghdad. Michael completed his education in the Jewish educational system of Baghdad, in Shamash School, receiving his high-school diploma in 1945.

At the age of 15, two years after the outbreak of World War II, Michael joined and soon became a leader of a leftist (Communist) underground group acting against the oppressive regime in Iraq. Michael later wrote about this period of his life in his novel A Handful of Fog. Shortly after, aged 17, he began writing articles for the Iraqi press. His political activities led to a warrant being issued for his arrest in 1948, Michael was forced to flee and went to Iran. The Iraqi court sentenced him to death in absentia. In Iran, he joined the communist party, Tudeh. Unable to return to Iraq, Michael came to Israel in 1949.

Michael arrived in Israel alone, his family remaining in Iraq, joining him later (1951). In the early 1950s the majority of Iraqi Jewry left Iraq, forced to relinquish their Iraqi citizenship. However, Michael always held Iraqi citizenship, as he did not officially give it up.

In Israel, his sister Nadia married Israeli spy Eli Cohen. Cohen, a Mossad spy, was captured by Syrian authorities after achieving high-level penetration into the Syrian government, and was executed in 1965. Michael claimed that Mossad had originally tried to recruit him in the 1950s, and only turned to his brother-in-law after he turned them down.

Michael settled in an Arab quarter of Haifa, Wadi Nisnas. He was invited to work for a newspaper by Emil Habibi. Michael was the only Jew on the editorial board of Al Ittihad and Al Jadid (Arabic-language newspapers of the communist party), where he worked as an editor for four years. At the same time, he had a weekly column in which he wrote stories and articles under the pseudonym Samir Mared. His stories, while written in the spirit of "socialist realism", were laced with irony and humor. In 1955, disillusioned with the policies of the USSR, he terminated his affiliation with the communist party, and concluded his work on both papers: "I left the party but not the ideals of socialism."

Michael worked as a hydrologist in the north of Israel (for 25 years). He completed his hydrology studies at the British Institute (London) and went on to study Psychology and Arabic Literature at the University of Haifa.

At the age of 45 Michael embarked upon the project of mastering the Hebrew language. In 1974 he published his first novel, in Hebrew, All Men are Equal – But Some are More, about the lives of immigrants in transit camps in Israel in the 1950s. The title of the novel – Shavim ve-Shavim Yoter – became a well-known phrase depicting the struggles for equality of Jews from Arab countries. This book opened the door for profound discussion about the socio-economic gaps in Israel and also about the situation of the Arabs in Israel.

Sami Michael published 11 novels and 3 non-fiction books focusing on cultural, political and social affairs in Israel, 3 plays and a children's book. Most of Michael's books were published by Am Oved publishers. Michael left Am Oved in 2007 and moved to Kinneret Zmora-Bitan Dvir publishers after receiving a very attractive offer, granting him a fixed monthly salary. His first book that published with them was Aida. Michael also wrote numerous articles and essays. His writings and his social and political activities made him a household name in Israel. Michael was never an author of the establishment, which meant that he did not enjoy promotional or financial assistance.

Two cities feature in many of Michael's novels. Victoria, Storm among the Palms, A Handful of Fog and Aida, are set in his home town Baghdad, and Refuge, A Trumpet in the Wadi, Water Kissing Water, and Nabila are set in Haifa, his adopted city. Michael wrote about his departure from Iraq and arrival in Haifa when he wrote of his first day in Haifa, Israel:

Each kilometer that the airplane gulped, took me further into a one way tunnel. The flight was a difficult separation from a pained love. When I opened my eyes, I imagined that I was looking at a Fata Morgana, which was stranger than anything I had ever known... I loved Haifa then, and about half a century later, I am faithful to this love. But at the beginning of my first day in Israel there were no designated moments for love set aside.

In 1982, he left Haifa for 10 years, moving to the rural, northern Galilee town of Ma'alot, on the hillside overlooking a valley. It is here that he wrote the novel Brown Devils about rock hyraxes that frequently stole the fruits of his well-tended garden. In 1992 Michael returned to Haifa.

Sami Michael's Way – "The man is the crown of creation" (literary way) – is a route in the Wadi Nisnas, an Arab quarter of Haifa, named after Michael in 2002. Literary extracts from his novels are written along the walls of the route, both in Hebrew and in Arabic. Michael dedicated three novels to Wadi Nisnas, including A Trumpet in the Wadi.

In 2008, Michael was appointed an honorary member of the Arabic Language Academy in Israel.

In 1987 the Israeli High Court of Justice appointed Michael as arbitrator to decide on a matter of education and multiculturalism. The subject was widely covered in the press, and his decision was a precedent in Israel which still stands.

Michael was the chairperson of the Aachi Council, a council of Iraqi artists in Israel. He was a member of staff of the Jewish Quarterly in London.

In 1998, Michael hosted a 13-part series on the Educational Television channel on World Literature, where he engaged writers, researchers and scholars in discussion about their favorite literary masterpieces.

A number of documentary films and programs on Michael have been made. Michael is a nominee for the Nobel Prize for Literature.

In 2013, the Sami Michael Association was formed with the aim of upholding Michael's heritage. As of 2017, the nonprofit department awards individuals "who work for society with regard to reducing gaps and providing equal opportunities, in the spirit of author Sami Michael's concept of heritage, with an emphasis on social and geographical periphery." Among the winners of the award are Shula Mola, Yoav Lalom, Netta Elkayam and Ibtisam Mara'ana.

Michael died in Haifa, Israel on 1 April 2024, at the age of 97.

== Writing ==
Michael's mother tongue was Arabic. It took him roughly 15 years to make the move from writing in Arabic to Hebrew. He has defined the switch as a "miracle":

It sometimes happens to me while writing, that I seek a word; mischievous as it is it appears in English, it appears in Arabic, but refuses to come in Hebrew. To some extent I made up my Hebrew. Unquestionably, the influence of Arabic is dominant, my syntax is almost Arabic.

— Sami Michael, Unbounded Ideas

When Victoria came out in Cairo, in the preface it was written that 'this is an Arabic novel written in Hebrew'. I took it as a compliment.

He wrote his first novel in Arabic, which won a prize awarded by the Communist Party. On leaving the party, he ceded publication of the book. Throwing the handwritten copy away, Unbounded Ideas.

In his study, amongst books in Hebrew, Arabic and English – novels, poetry, politics, history and science – lies on the table a student's folder and inside it neatly arranged pages of his next novel – all handwritten in exemplary fashion on white paper; rows of sentences in perfectly straight lines, that later he will cross out again and again until he decides that this is it, it can be typed. Not by himself. "At my age you want me to write on a computer? I belong to the generation that does not press buttons, but rather turn them," he explains, "I could not do otherwise. I need the contact of the pen where the words flow from the hand on to the page."

== Awards and citations ==
- 1976 (and 1990) – Zeev Prize
- 1978 – Kugel Prize for literature, awarded by the Municipality of Holon
- 1981 – Prime Minister's Prize for Hebrew Literary Works
- 1981 – Petach-Tikva Prize for fine literature
- 1990 – Prize of the cylinder, Ministry of Education and culture and fund of culture America Israel, Omanut La-Am
- 1992 – Hans Christian Andersen Award – International Board on Books for Young People (IBBY), Berlin
- 1993 – Victoria selected as novel of the year in Israeli Radio, Kol Israel
- 1993 – Am Oved Prize for Victoria
- 1993 – ACUM Prize for Victoria (1993)
- 1993 – Wizo Prize for Victoria (Paris)
- 1994 – Israeli Literature prize (by Ministry of Education, Science and Art)
- 1996 – Honor prize (Berlin)
- 1998 – International Rotary prize
- 1999 – Joseph Avileah Prize
- 2001 – special prize by Society for International Development (SID), promoted by United Nations and Italian Association for the Promotion of Peace in the Middle East (AISI), Italy
- 2002 – Awarded Key to the City, Haifa
- 2004 – Brenner Prize
- 2005 – President and Hebrew University Prize
- 2005 – Honorary of Beit Hagefen Arab-Jewish Center
- 2007 – Wizo Prize (Italy)
- 2007 – EMET Prize for Arts, Science and Culture
- 2008 – Gilboa Award for Tolerance and Coexistence
- 2012 – ACUM Lifetime Achievement Award for literature - "The Prize is granted for a long writing career that has spanned many years. Sami Michael has enriched the Hebrew literature in his unique, ground breaking work whose influence is far wider than just literature."
- 2012 – Ometz Decoration
- 2018 – Agnon Prize
- 2018 – Shulamit Aloni Prize for Lifetime Achievement

=== Honorary doctorates ===
The Hebrew University (1995) "a distinguished writer of the generation that witnessed the early years of Israel's statehood, Michael sheds light on aspects of life that rarely feature in Israeli literature and empowers his work with a use of true-life artistry that strips away outmoded myths and hackneyed forms of description."

Ben Gurion University of the Negev (2000): "In his books, human beings are portrayed as they are – with their weaknesses and their virtues – with cold, at times almost cruel realism, yet always with compassion for mankind."

Tel Aviv University (2002): for "his significant contribution to Israeli culture as a unique literary voice and sociopolitical critic. His role in redefining the Israeli experience by broadening its scope and introducing previously unmentioned themes; his ground-breaking work as a protest writer who expressed the discrimination felt both by new immigrants and Israeli Arabs; his role as a leading figure in contemporary Hebrew literature."

University of Haifa (2009): "in recognition of his prolific literary contribution, which reflects the many faces of Israeli society with respect for mankind and its freedom. Michael's public activity that consistently expresses deep commitment to peace, justice and civilian rights; and his contribution to the advancement of mutual understanding between the different denominations and between Jews and Arabs."

=== Honoris causa ===
Honoris Causa from COMAS, The College of Management Academic Studies (2008): "For his contribution in Literature and for his activities on behalf of human rights".

Honoris Causa Degree from Beit Berl - The Multidisciplinary Academic Instituation (2012): "For his great contribution to Hebrew literature; for shaping the cultural landscape of Israeli society through his writings, way of thinking, and public activities; for promoting human and minorities rights in Israel; for nurturing coexistence between Jews and Arabs and encouraging values of equality and justice for all."

== Social Activities ==
Michael was known for his deep commitment to peace, justice and human rights. He was on the board of various councils. Michael was a true left-winger, both socially and politically. While still in Baghdad, he was aware of the social gaps in society, and from his youth, he was active in the struggle for equality and human rights. In Israel he never ceased to work for human rights.

Michael was amongst a group of leaders of the Communist underground in Iraq. At this time there was no written material on Communism in Arabic, which meant they had to translate everything from English. During his time in Iran Michael joined Tudeh, the Iranian Communist party. Once in Israel he joined the Israeli Communist party; he was a youth leader and worked on the editorial board of Al Itihad and Al Jadid (Arabic language newspapers of the communist party) where he worked as an editor for four years. At the same time, he had a weekly column in which he wrote stories and articles under the pseudonym "Samir Mared". In 1955, a short time before the mass disillusionment with Stalin he ended his affiliation with the communist party, and concluded his work on both papers: "…because they transgressed against all my ideals. Today I am a Marxist." "Communism was a beautiful illusion; despite the disillusionment I will always believe in the human spirit and justice," said Michael. "I joined Communism as a Jew and I left Communism as a Jew", wrote Michael in Unbounded Ideas.

After leaving the Communist party Michael chose not to belong to any political organization "in order to keep his conceptual independence as an intellectual". Not once has Michael said: "I am a Party of one man."

Michael was amongst the first in Israel (1950s) to call for coexistence between Jews and Arabs, signing the first petition of artists and public figures calling for the establishment of a Palestinian state.

Michael was against the terms "Mizrahim" and "Edot HaMizrach", claiming it's a Mapai's fictitious identity to preserve a "rival" to the "Ashkenazim" and help them push the "Mizrahim" below in the social-economic ladder and behind them, so they won't ever be in line with the Israeli elites of European Jewish descent. He was also going against the Mapai manner of labeling all the Oriental Jews as "one folk" and erasing their unique and individual history as separated communities; he wonders why the real Easterners of his time who were the Eastern European Jewish peasants from the villages weren't labeled as "Mizrahi" in Israel while fitting it more than the Oriental Jews who were labeled that way. Michael is also against the inclusion of Oriental Jewish communities who do not descend from Sepharadic Jews, as his own Iraqi Jews, as "Sepharadim" by the Israeli politicians, calling it "historically inaccurate". He also mentioned that his work as an author is always referred to as "Ethnic" while European Jews' work, even if historic in theme, isn't for that very racism.

Michael was invited to give lectures in Cairo directly following the signing of the peace agreement between Israel and Egypt. During the first Palestinian Intifada (uprising) he was amongst a delegation of intellectuals that broke through IDF barriers that besieged Hebron. In 1994, Michael was invited together with Palestinian author Emil Habibi to Tunis (at a time when Israelis could not travel there) sponsored by UNESCO and the Tunisian Ministry of Culture for a conference in Carthago on Arabic Literature.

Michael was known as a peace activist. "There are many definitions of war in different countries. According to my experience, I find that war is a type of disease that damages both body and soul and horribly distorts the images of people. I, myself am a product of two cultures, (Arab and Jewish), and to this day I do not understand the destructive power which has brought the two cultures to life and death confrontations. There is so much beauty and wisdom in the two cultures. It is so easy to be clever and give advice from afar, so hard to be wise and sane from within the flames."

Michael established together with activists a movement against Meir Kahane (a Jewish advocate for banishment of Arabs from Israel, called "transfer") in Ma'alot, where he lived for 10 years (1982–1992).

Michael was a partner in the struggle against the expulsion of Palestinian South Hebron Mountain cave dwellers: "The state of Israel was established thanks to international recognition which was granted following the holocaust and the deportations, stating that the Jewish people were entitled to establish a national home, where the proverbial wandering Jew and the refugee will find safe and secure habitat. This would be evil if we were to expel the caves inhabitants, if only because they don't have any defense or savior. The expulsion of these wretched people undermine our moral right to sit as free men and women in our secure homes in Tel Aviv, Jerusalem and Haifa. There is abominable personal terror, but the use of militaristic power to banish citizens from their shacks and from their caves is no less abominable. Event at Tzavta Tel Aviv, 2002.

In 2007 Michael, together with David Sasson, created the Forum of the peace initiative with Syria. The forum included Intellectuals, academics and business people such as Yaakov Peri, Amnon Lipikin Shahak and Alon Liel. An extract of the declaration composed by Michael: "We gave up Sinai and in return we gained peace with Egypt. We call upon the government of Israel, upon those amongst us who are responsible for designing policy, to listen to the voices that are making themselves heard from Damascus. Peace with Syria means peace with the region in which we live. The price of peace is much cheaper than the bitter and destructive price of war."

He has written extensively on social and political matters for Arabic and Hebrew newspapers and occasionally for foreign newspapers. His stance against stereotyping, prejudices and racism is also reflected in his novels. Even in his first novel, All Men Are Equal – But Some Are More (1974), he writes of these prejudices within Jewish society in Israel. The novel was influential for the second generation of the immigrants who saw Michael as a spiritual leader. The name of the book became a well-known saying.

On the ever-widening social and economic gap in Israel, Sami Michael has said,

This is dangerous shortsightedness. Poverty is a hot-house for the collapse of democracy and culture. Poverty is not a natural disaster. The rich need to understand that widespread poverty threatens, in essence, the existence of social-order. The most secured mansion with all its inhabitants, will not endure if the mansion is built in the center of a shantytown.

When the annual report of ACRI came out on International Human Rights Day, December 10, 2007, it noted:

Author Sami Michael, the association's president, said upon the release of the report that racism was so rife it was damaging civil liberty in Israel. Israeli society is reaching new heights of racism that damages freedom of expression and privacy.

At the Hebrew Book Fair in Tel Aviv, when Michael made a solitary demonstration against racism in Emanuel (a settlement town):

Let's call a spade a spade: The lords of Emanuel are racists who imperil the values of Judaism and democracy. This separation fence of defilement, which shady rabbis plot to plant in our souls, must be uprooted… I will definitely demonstrate during the celebration of Hebrew Book Week, for a school is called 'the house of the book' in Hebrew… Every man, woman and teenager will be welcome to join me to extirpate the racist crime in Immanuel today – and should we remain silent, in all of Israel tomorrow.

About the immigrant and foreigner:

The fact that we are talking about Christians and Buddhists and those without religion does not negate from them the possibility to be helped as the poor of my city. How could we, as Jews that groaned under the evils of fascistic regimes, adopt the same fascistic measures towards those who are prepared to come here (Israel) to look after our sick and elderly and to strengthen our factories? And what about the children of these foreign workers that were born here and whose only language is Hebrew, they no longer have another homeland? And in whose name exactly are we entitled to trample on these people and their rights? We that claimed the right and the duty, to take care of the migrant, the orphan and the widow?

Michael was also for years a volunteer in the ERAN organization, an Israeli 24-hour mental crisis hotline. He also volunteered to give lectures for prisoners.

In 1987 the Israeli High Court of Justice appointed Michael as arbitrator to decide on a matter of education and multiculturalism. The subject was widely covered in the press and his decision was a precedent in Israel which still stands.

Michael was chairman of the council of AHI, the Council of Iraqi born Artists for encouragement of research, literature and art in Israel (Ramat-Gan).

In the early 1990s, he was on the editorial staff of the Jewish Quarterly, published in London.

In 1998, he was elected president of The Society for Solidarity between the People of Israel and the People of Iraq, a non-profit society founded by key public figures from cultural, academic and intellectual circles in Israeli society. The group, attracting much attention in Israel, the Arab world and elsewhere, stresses that a clear distinction ought to be made between the Iraqi oppressive regime and the Iraqi people, who have unjustifiably borne the horrifying consequences of the ongoing conflict in the region. The request of the group, however, to be registered as an official non-profit organization was denied by the Interior Ministry's registrar, claiming that Israeli law forbids “contact with 'enemy states'.” In April 2003 the founders reestablished the Society. Michael was reelected as its president. In the same year after the fall of Saddam Hussein's regime, Michael was invited to join the group of composers of the new Iraqi constitution. As he did not reside in Iraq nor had he for many years, he felt that it would not be right. He did however have one request which was to insert one important clause: the defense of minorities.

Michael had close relations with many Iraqis, both in Iraq and throughout the world. His novel Aida (2008) is set in Iraq in the days of Saddam Hussein. Friends from Iraq sent him up-to-date pictures of the country so that Michael could see the Iraq of today. He wrote thereon in the acknowledgements of the novel: "I will not forget the good people who extended me their help which was priceless, but I am not able to mention their names as it may put them in danger, amongst them university professors businessmen and women and journalists who risked their freedom to help, and where one of whom was actually arrested for this literary mission."

== On religion, secularism, and Judaism ==
Sami Michael defined himself first of all as a Jew and only secondly as an Israeli. He came from a secular Jewish family in Baghdad. He was an atheist. "In the Jewish community in Iraq we lived in harmony, almost absolute between the religious and the secular. In Israel I demand the religious to respect my secularity. I have a personal permit to talk with my own personal god. For this I do not need the rabbinate." –Unbounded Ideas

== Works ==
=== Fiction ===
- All Men are Equal – But Some are More (in Hebrew: Shavim ve-Shavim Yoter), novel, 1974
- Storm among the Palms, in Hebrew: Sufa ben ha-D'kalim, novel, 1975
- Refuge (in Hebrew: Hasut), novel, 1977
- A Handful of Fog (in Hebrew: Hofen shel Arafel ), novel, 1979
- Tin Shacks and Dreams (in Hebrew: Pahonim ve-Halomot ), novel, 1979
- A Trumpet in the Wadi (in Hebrew: Hatsotsrah ba-Wadi ), novel, 1987, ISBN 965-13-0455-3
  - A 2002 film with the same name had won several awards
- Love among the Palms (in Hebrew: Ahava ben ha-D'kalim), novel, 1990, ISBN 965-07-0084-6
- Victoria, novel, 1993, ISBN 965-13-0867-2
- Brown Devils (in Hebrew: Shedim Khumim), novel, 1993, ISBN 965-448-022-0
- "The first day in Israel; in Haifa", short story, 1997
- The Third Wing (in Hebrew: Ha-Canaf Ha-Shlishit ), novelette, 2000, ISBN 965-07-0901-0
- Water Kissing Water (in Hebrew: Mayim Noshkim le-Mayim), novel, 2001, ISBN 965-13-1516-4
- Pigeons in Trafalgar (in Hebrew: Yonim be-Trafalgar), novel, 2005, sequel/dialogue to the novella Return to Haifa by Ghassan Kanafani, ISBN 965-13-1761-2
- Aida, novel, 2008
- The ABC go to the Sea (in Hebrew: Otiyot Holchot La-yam), children's book, 2009, ISBN 978-965-517-456-4
- The Flight of the Swans (in Hebrew: Maof Ha-Barboorim), novel, 2011, ISBN 978-965-517-998-9.
- Little Cricket Singing in the Rain (in Hebrew: Tzirtzaron Shar Gam Ba-Horef)children's book, 2012, ISBN 978-965-552-345-4
- Diamond from the Wilderness (in Hebrew: Yahalom Min Ha-Yeshimon) novel, 2015, ISBN 978-965-552-985-2

=== Non-fiction ===
- Eleh Shivtei Yisrael: Shteim Esreh Sikhot al ha-She'elah ha-Edatit (These are the Tribes of Israel: Twelve Conversations on the Question of [Ethnic] Communities), 1984
- Gvulot ha-Ruakh: Sikhot im Ruvik Rozental (Unbounded Ideas: Ruvik Rosenthal talks with Sami Michael), 2000, ISBN 965-02-0138-6
- Ha-Khavayyah ha-Yisraelit (The Israeli Experience), 2001

=== Plays ===
- Devils in the Basement, 1983– Haifa Theater
- Twins, 1988 – Haifa Theater
- He, 1999 – Tzavta Tel-Aviv

=== Works translated by Michael ===
Michael undertook two sizeable tasks of translation from Arabic, his mother tongue into Hebrew, his second language; the first being a trilogy by the Egyptian Nobel Prize laureate Naguib Mahfouz, Cairo Trilogy: Palace Walk (original Arabic title: Bein el-Qasrein, 1956), Palace of Desire (Qasr el-Shoaq, 1957), Sugar Street (El-Sukkareyya, 1957) This Hebrew translation was the first translation of the trilogy. It is part of the academic curriculum in Israel.

In an interview with Imam Al-Chakim, the film director, Tuefik Salah, a close friend of Naguib Mahfouz, he spoke of his intimate relations between Mahfouz and three Israeli figures: two researchers and the author Sami Michael:

"The translation of the work of Mahfouz by Sami Michael into Hebrew, held great importance for Mahfouz, which he sees as a significant step that indicates the possibility of making peace and coexistence between the Arab world and Israel. Michael met with Mahfouz many times, who never hid his high estimation and gratitude for the translation of the Cairo Trilogy into Hebrew, and which was reflected in the way Mahfouz welcomed Michael into his home and presented him to his close friends."

During a visit to the home of Mahfouz, Prof. Sasson Somekh noticed the Hebrew translation of the trilogy on a bookstand next to his writing-desk. Mahfouz told him: "The symbolism of this translation bestows it special value".

The second translation was of lyrics of the Great Arab 'lyricists', lyricists such as Farid al-Atrash, Mohammed Abdel Wahab, and the prince Abdulla al-Faisal . It was for a 45 part television series, performed by famous Arab singers such as Umm Kulthum and Fairuz.

== Quotes by Sami Michael ==
"Emigration is a form of death. An emigrant is a human being who commits suicide in the hope of coming back to life in a better reality." Unbounded Ideas

"Culture is the first to faint in wars." The Flight of the Swans

"There are many definitions of war in various cultures. I find that war is a kind of plague whose outburst can always be prevented." The Flight of the Swans

"There are words that hurt when they are said, and there are words that injure more when they are unsaid." The Flight of the Swans

"Universal literature does not need a passport or visa from this or that ruler. It crosses borders, and like water its passes above and below, and from the bowels of the earth it is borne on the wings of the wind."

"The most valued tangible homeland is possibly the woman you love." Aida

“I am leaving Iraq for good. For the rest of my life. Till the day I die I shall not see the Tigris. I will be standing in a strange street, in a strange city, and I will scream but no one will hear me… And I know not how this differs from death.” A Handful of Fog

"Literature is the Bible for the secular, a bible that is written and rewritten in beautiful, diverse variations. Buried beneath the attractive cover is a social human message, no less than in any other religion." Unbounded Ideas
