= Sugar Street =

Sugar Street may refer to:

- Sugar Street (novel)
- Sugar Street (Hong Kong)
