= Battle of Haifa (1948) =

Battle of the Arab-Israeli War

Coordinates: 32°48′55.85″N 34°58′30.77″E

- Part of the 1947–48 Civil War in Mandatory Palestine, the Nakba, and Plan Dalet
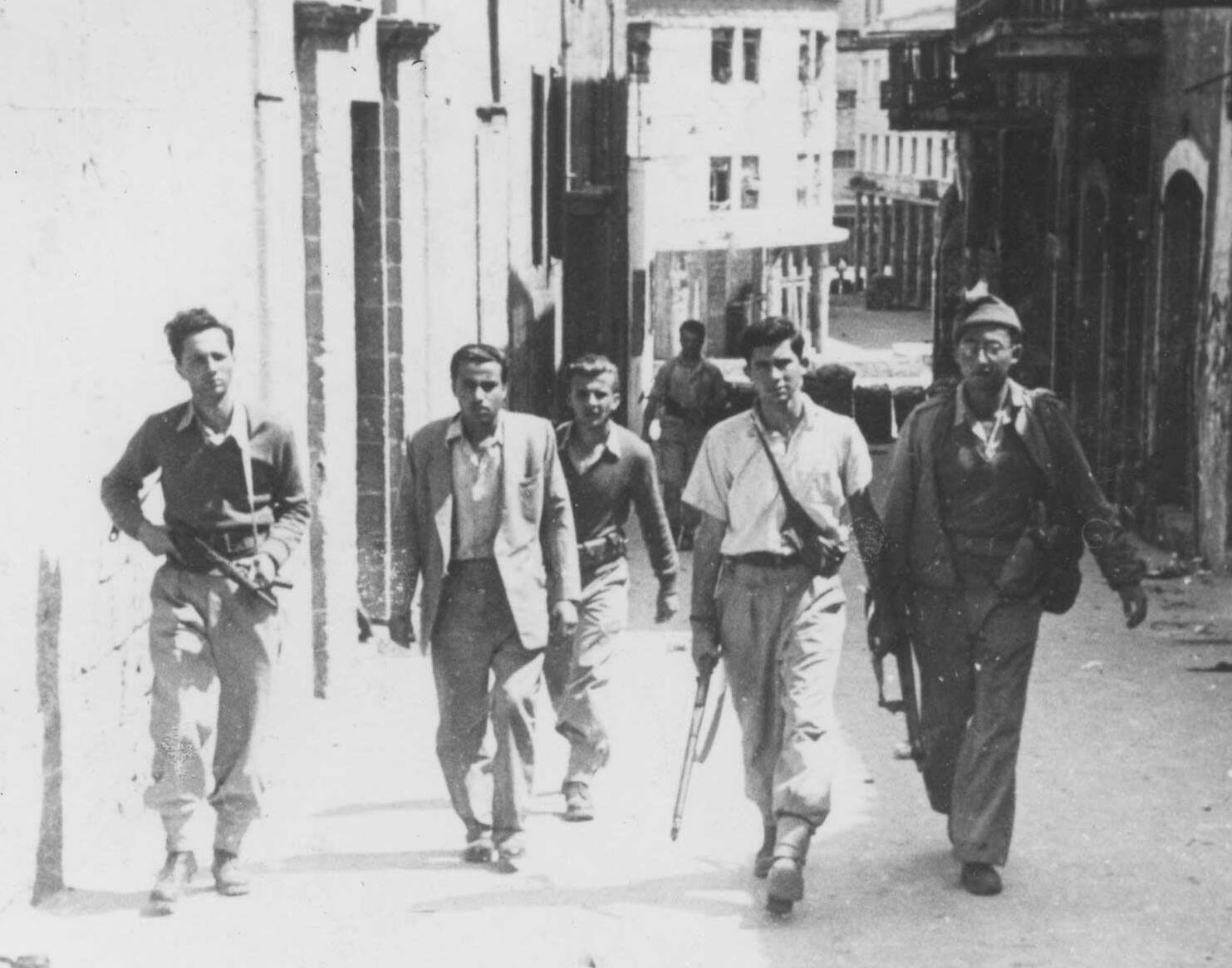
- Jewish fighters in Haifa, circa 21–22 April 1948
Date	21–22 April 1948
Location	Haifa, Mandatory Palestine
Result	Haganah victory; ~15,000 Arab residents flee or are expelled
Territorial changes	Haganah captures Haifa which later becomes part of the State of Israel

Belligerents
Haganah; Palmach; Hish	Arab Higher Committee; Arab Liberation Army; Palestinian Arab irregulars

Commanders and leaders
Moshe Carmel; Mordechai Maklef	Capt. Amin Bey Izz al-Din; Yunnis Naffa

Strength
~500–1,000	~500–1,000

Casualties and losses
16-20 dead; 30-40 wounded	Morris 2004: 100-150 dead; Kimche and Morris 1991: 200-300 dead

The Battle of Haifa, also known as the Fall of Haifa, and called by the Jewish forces Operation Bi'ur Hametz (Hebrew: מבצע ביעור חמץ "Cleansing the Leaven" or "Passover Cleaning"), was a Haganah operation carried out on 21–22 April 1948 and a major event in the final stages of the civil war in Palestine, leading up to the 1948 Arab–Israeli War.

The objective of the operation was the capture of the Arab neighborhoods of Haifa. The operation formed part of the 1948 Palestinian expulsion and flight, with approximately 15,000 Arab residents being displaced between April 21–22, and with only 4,000 remaining in the city by mid-May from a pre-conflict population of approximately 65,000.

== Background ==
Before the war, Haifa was a mixed city with a population of 135-140,000, split between Jews (70,000-74,000) and Palestinian Arabs (65,000-70,000). The two populations were largely separate, with the main Jewish areas of the city being Hadar HaCarmel, Bat Galim, and Neve Sha'anan, while Halisa, Wadi Salib, Wadi Nisnas, Kfur Samir, and Wadi al-Jimal were predominantly Arab.

A significant port city situated on the Mediterranean coast, Haifa was a strategic location in Palestine. Having been allocated to a Jewish state under the United Nations Partition Plan for Palestine, the leadership of the Yishuv considered it of vital importance. With the capture of the port of Haifa it would be possible for the Haganah to receive supplies and armaments.

With the outbreak of the 1947–1948 civil war in Mandatory Palestine, Haifa's Arab population was subject to acts of terrorism by the Irgun and Haganah, and many Palestinians began to flee the city. By mid March, 25,000 to 30,000 Palestinian Arabs had already evacuated from Haifa.

The implementation of Plan Dalet in Haganah's April offensive—including Operation Nachshon to open the Tel-Aviv–Jerusalem road, and Operation Yiftah to control eastern Galilee—appeared to take the Arab Higher Committee (AHC) by surprise. The Palestinian Arab half of Haifa was remote from other major Palestinian Arab centres and contact had been cut off by the Jewish villages along the approach roads to Haifa. Businesses and workshops had closed with no prospect of continued employment. Unemployment was rife and the cost of food had escalated.

== Preparations and hostilities in March–April 1948 ==
On 17 March 1948 Mohammad bin Hammad Al Huneiti, commander of the town's Arab militia, was killed in an ambush of a convoy bringing 15 tons of arms and explosives. His death left his followers demoralised. According to Jon Kimche the Haganah had a highly placed informer and were able to intercept nine of eleven Palestinian Arab arms convoys into Haifa. The Arab garrison of the Palestinian Arab areas of the city was commanded by Captain Amin Izz al-Din who had been appointed by the Arab Liberation Army's (ALA) military committee on 27 March in Damascus. Through the next month his original force of 450 was depleted by desertion until it was no longer a fighting force. Izz al-Din organised several operations against the Jewish community, including detonating a truck-load of explosives near the flour mills. The fighting in the city intensified with exchanges of fire and mortar attacks in the downtown and Hadar.

The British had previously controlled the city and maintained a buffer between the Jewish and Arab populations. In preparation for the total evacuation of all British forces from the mandate, the British began an evacuation of troops through the port of Haifa in early April. A volunteer police force had been established in preparation of handing over to the United Nations Palestine Commission as the provisional Government of Palestine. The original British Government intentions had been to evacuate Palestine gradually from south to north of Palestine, using Haifa as the embarkation port, to be completed by mid May. On 18 April 1948, Major-General Hugh Stockwell, British Commanding Officer, Northern sector, Haifa, summoned a representative of the Jewish Agency to his headquarters. Stockwell relayed his intention to withdraw the British forces from the borders and no-man's-land zones in Haifa and that the evacuation would be completed by 20 April. The Haganah saw this change of plan as an opportunity and quickly prepared a 3-pronged attack on the Arab neighborhoods of Wadi Nisnas, Wadi Salib and Khalisa.

The sudden British deployment caused the Carmeli commanders to re-work the details of the operation (previously a plan called Operation Misparayim or Operation Scissors). The revised plan was named Mivtza Bi'ur Hametz, translated as Operation Cleansing the Leaven, (Note: Raz 2024 translates as "Operation Bi’ur Hametz (The Burning of Leavened Products") Operation Passover Cleaning, or "Passover Cleansing").

== Battle ==
The Haganah's force consisted of 5 companies from the Field Corps, one Palmach company, and a contingent of the Guard Corps. The Jewish forces attacked Wadi Salib and Wadi Nisnas from Hadar HaCarmel, while the bulk of the attack on Khalisa came from Neve Sha'anan. The Arab headquarters were in the center of the city, near the port and the railway depot.

Commenting on the use of 'psychological warfare broadcasts' and military tactics in Haifa, Benny Morris wrote:

Throughout the Haganah made effective use of Arabic language broadcasts and loudspeaker vans. Haganah Radio announced that 'the day of judgement had arrived' and called on inhabitants to 'kick out the foreign criminals' and to 'move away from every house and street, from every neighbourhood occupied by foreign criminals'. The Haganah broadcasts called on the populace to 'evacuate the women, the children and the old immediately, and send them to a safe haven'.

Mordechai Maklef ordered the Carmeli Brigade to "kill any Arab you encounter; torch all inflammable objects and force doors open with explosives."

Arab neighborhoods were attacked with mortars and gunfire. Rashid al-Haj Ibrahim, a Palestinian Arab municipal leader, described attacks as "provoking terror among the women and children, who were very influenced by the horrors of Dayr Yasin." He described the flight of Haifa's Arab residents thus:

Thousands of women, children and men hurried to the port district in a state of chaos and terror without precedent in the history of the Arab nation. They fled their houses to the coast, barefoot and naked, to wait for their turn to travel to Lebanon. They left their homeland, their houses, their possessions, their money, their welfare, and their trades, to surrender their dignity and their souls.

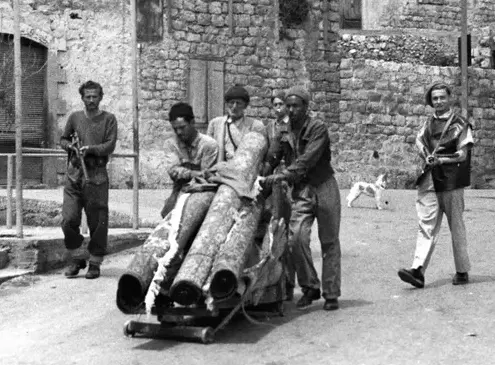
Arab residents leaving the city after its fall, accompanied by armed Haganah personnel.

A British intelligence officer reported that Zionist forces "were continually shooting down on all Arabs who moved both in Wadi Nisnas and the Old City. This included completely indiscriminate and revolting machinegun fire, mortar fire and sniping on women and children sheltering in churches and attempting to get out." The Haganah command issued orders to troops to "treat places of worship with respect." In late afternoon of April 22, the Carmeli Brigade reported that "The Arab hospitals are full of dead and wounded. Corpses and wounded lie in the streets and are not collected for lack of organisation and sanitary means; panic in the Arab street is great".

On April 22 a meeting was held in the town hall to discuss terms of the truce. The Haifa Arab Emergency Committee stated that "that they were not in a position to sign a truce, as they had no control over the Arab military elements in the town and that . . . they could not fulfill the terms of the truce, even if they were to sign" adding "that the Arab population wished to evacuate Haifa . . . man, woman and child." By then, the British were only in control of the Haifa port area. The rest of the city was in the hands of the Carmeli Brigade of the Haganah, commanded by Moshe Carmel.

On April 22, the Hagana shelled the crowded market square, causing many casualties.

Approximately 15,000 Arabs fled Haifa during April 21–22. The number of Arab casualties is unknown, with Jon Kimche estimating ~300 killed. Benny Morris wrote that "the Haganah's 36-hour offensive in Haifa [...] resulted in 200-300 Arab dead all told" in 1991, but in 2004 he listed 100 - 150 dead. He cited Major-General Hugh Stockwell's estimate of around 100 dead, and 150–200 wounded in 2008.

Rosemarie Esber writes that "the mass exodus of Haifa’s Arabs in April 1948 illustrates in microcosm how the Zionists used the cover of war to expel the Arabs during the mandate’s final months".

== Aftermath ==
After April 22, there were some 30,000–45,000 Arabs remaining in Haifa, from the pre conflict population estimate of 65,000–70,000. By mid-May there were only ~4,000. The displacement of Palestinians from Haifa formed a significant part of the larger 1948 Palestinian expulsion and flight. A number of historians consider the expulsions in Haifa and elsewhere to have been an instance of ethnic cleansing.

On 23 April Moshe Carmel declared Martial Law in the town. On the same day units from the Irgun moved into parts of downtown Haifa. Two days later the Haganah forced them to withdraw in a confrontation that resulted in some Irgun casualties.

After the fall of the city there was widespread looting by Zionist forces in Arab areas. Moshe Dayan was appointed to administer abandoned Arab property in the city. He instituted a policy of collecting anything the army could use and storing it in warehouses, with the rest distributed among Jewish agricultural settlements. Golda Meir, who was consulted, agreed with this policy. Historian Adam Raz writes that "there is little difference in the way that Haifa and Jaffa were plundered, because the two cities were completely pillaged."

The military prosecutor for the Haifa district stated in mid-June that "there was no longer anything to take from the Arabs. It was simply a pogrom. [...] The commanders, each one of them made excuses: ‘I only arrived two weeks ago’ etc. There was nobody to arrest. There was no way to know when the pillaging took place, and they replaced commanders daily." David Ben-Gurion wrote in his diary that "There were cases where Haganah members, including commanders, were found in possession of stolen property too. About ten of them are currently being held for this."

Historian Saleh Abdel Jawad writes that "After the fall of Haifa, the Haganah continued to bombard civilian gatherings, especially near the port." He also relates that on 27 April, seven Palestinians accused of involvement in the Haifa Oil Refinery massacre were executed by the Haganah.

In July the remaining Palestinians were displaced from their homes and concentrated primarily in the Wadi Nisnas neighbourhood in a process of ghettoization. Adam Raz writes that Haifa's remaining Arab Christians were to be concentrated in Wasi Nisnas and the Arab Muslims in Wadi Salib. Raz writes that this was ordered by David Ben-Gurion and that further orders were given that it was "forbidden for the number of the Arabs in the city to exceed 15,000; second, two-thirds of those who remained would be Christians and one-third would be Muslim".

A systematic destruction of what had been Arab housing was implemented in certain areas by Haifa's Technical and Urban Development departments in cooperation with the IDF's city commander Ya'akov Lublini.

== Historiography ==
In 1991, historian Benny Morris disagreed with Norman Finkelstein's description of the displacement of Haifa's Arab population as having been a "covert expulsion". Finkelstein wrote that "Morris's own evidence points to the conclusion that Palestine's Arabs were expelled systematically and with premeditation."

Benny Morris asserted that the initial order to evacuate came from local Arab leadership, and that the Arab Higher Committee endorsed it "ex post facto". Among the evidence he cites are British and American intelligence reports, and an assessment by the British High Commissioner of Palestine. Possible reasons given by Morris include clearing the way for the Jordanian Arab Legion's impending entry into the war and avoiding the population being used as hostages. Historian Walid Khalidi criticized Morris' views and wrote that "the Zionist/Israeli claim that the exodus of Haifa's civilian population was [...] in response to specific orders to that effect from the Palestinian leadership, is entirely without foundation." He described "the mass exodus of Haifa's Arab population" as "the spontaneous reaction to the ruthless combination of terror and psychological warfare tactics adopted by the Haganah during the attack."

Finkelstein writes that the attack on Haifa was part of Plan Dalet, and that "events in Haifa generally conformed to the pattern of terror, assault and expulsion".

== See also ==
- List of battles and operations in the 1948 Palestine war

== Bibliography ==
- Esber, Rosemarie M. (2008). Under the Cover of War: The Zionist Expulsion of the Palestinians. Arabicus Books & Media. ISBN 978-0-9815131-7-1.
- ————————— (2003). "The 1948 Palestinian Arab Exodus from Haifa". The Arab World Geographer. 6 (2): 112–141. doi:10.64903/arwg.6.2.6012k171034g3nw8. ISSN 1480-6800.
- Golani, Motti (2001). "The 'Haifa Turning Point': The British Administration and the Civil War in Palestine, December 1947-May 1948". Middle Eastern Studies. 37 (2): 93–130. doi:10.1080/714004397. ISSN 0026-3206. JSTOR 4284157.
- Khalidi, Walid (2008). "The Fall of Haifa Revisited". Journal of Palestine Studies. 37 (3): 30–58. doi:10.1525/jps.2008.37.3.30. ISSN 0377-919X.
- Morris, Benny (2008). 1948: A History of the First Arab-Israeli War. New Haven, CT: Yale University Press. ISBN 978-0-300-14524-3.
- —————— (2004). The Birth of the Palestinian Refugee Problem Revisited. doi:10.1017/CBO9780511816659. ISBN 978-0-521-81120-0.
- —————— (1987). The Birth of the Palestinian Refugee Problem, 1947-1949. Cambridge University Press. ISBN 978-0-521-33028-2.
- Pappe, Ilan (2007). The Ethnic Cleansing of Palestine. Oneworld Publications. ISBN 978-1-85168-555-4.
- Raz, Adam (2024). Loot: How Israel Stole Palestinian Property. Verso Books. ISBN 978-1-80429-517-5.
