= Palace of Desire =

Palace of Desire may refer to:

- Palace of Desire (novel), a 1957 novel by Egyptian writer Naguib Mahfouz.
- Palace of Desire (TV series), also known as Da Ming Gong Ci, a 2000 Chinese television series.
