= Wadi Nisnas =

Neighbourhood in Haifa

Coordinates: 32°48′59″N 34°59′47″E

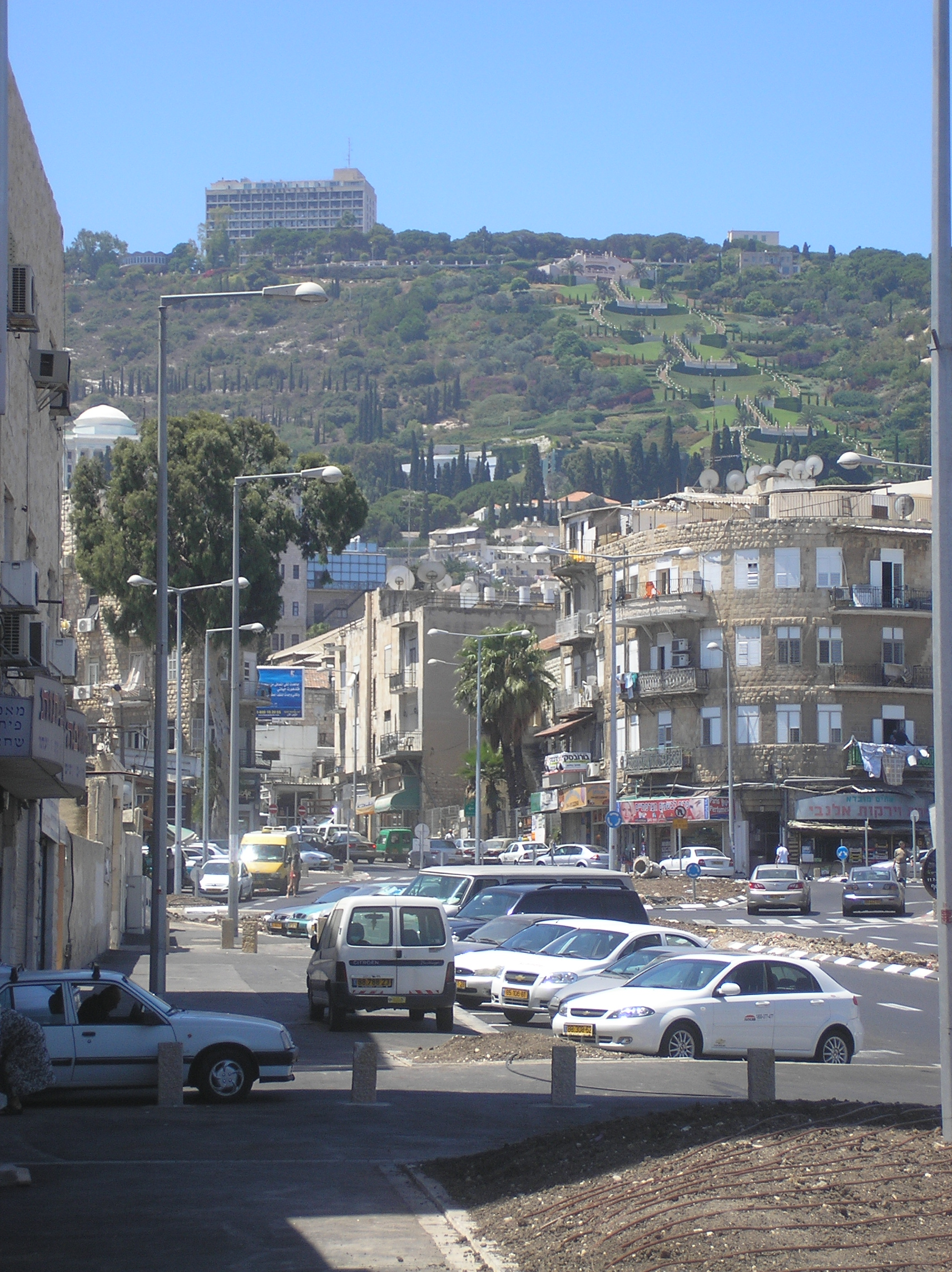
A street in Wadi Nisnas, 2008

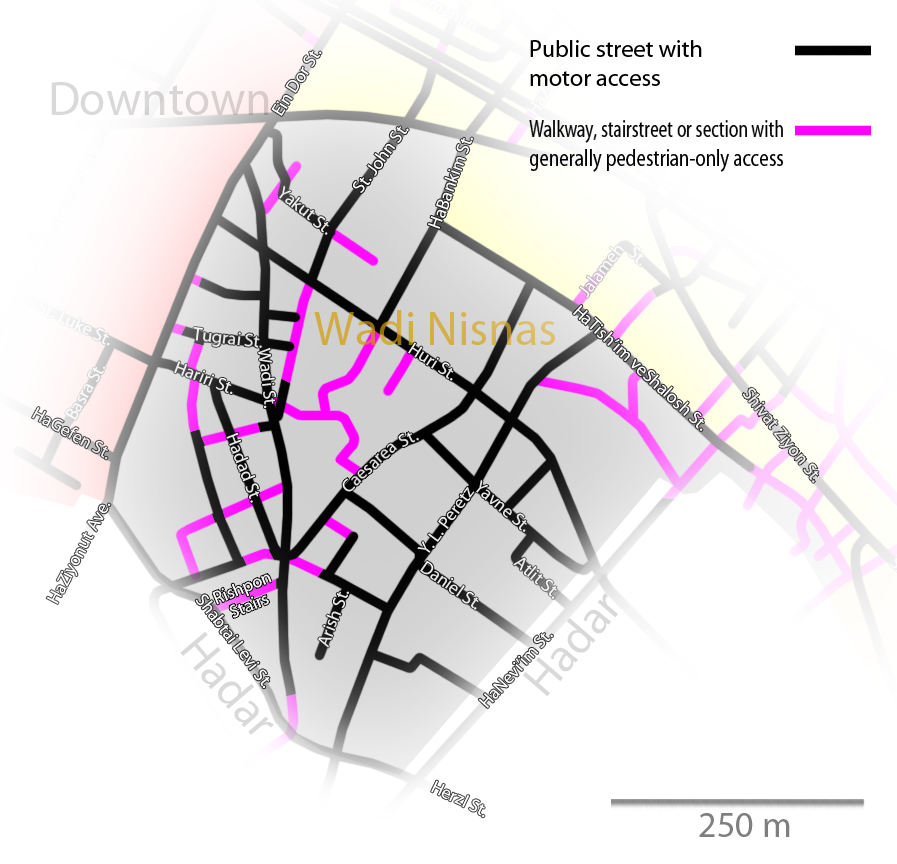
Map of Wadi Nisnas

Wadi Nisnas (Arabic: وادي النسناس; Hebrew: ואדי ניסנאס) is a predominantly Arab neighborhood in the city of Haifa, with a population of about 8,000 inhabitants.

== Etymology ==
'Wadi' is the Arabic word for valley, and 'nisnas' means mongoose, with the Egyptian mongoose being indigenous to the region.

== History ==
Wadi Nisnas was developed at the end of the nineteenth century as a Christian-Arab neighborhood outside the walls of Haifa.

=== 1948 Palestine war ===
During the 1948 Palestine war, as part of the 1948 Palestinian expulsion and flight, the vast majority of Haifa's Arab population fled or were expelled from the city, many during the battle of Haifa. The remaining Arab population was relocated to Wadi Nisnas in a process that has been described as "ghettoization". (Note: Finkelstein, Norman. “Myths, Old and New.” Journal of Palestine Studies 21, no. 1 (1991): 66–89. https://doi.org/10.2307/2537366 - "In July, Haifa's remaining inhabitants, some 3,500, were packed into a ghetto in the downtown Wadi Nisnas neighborhood.") (Note: Azoulay, Ariella. “Declaring the State of Israel: Declaring a State Of.” Critical Inquiry 37, no. 2 (2011): 265–85. https://doi.org/10.1086/657293 - "[...] the ghetto in Wadi Nisnas that had been established for them after they had been expelled from their homes.")

=== Present day ===
The current Israeli Central Bureau of Statistics census estimates that 66% of the Wadi Nisnas population are Christians, 31.5% are Muslims, and the rest are Jews.

== Cultural references ==
Wadi Nisnas is the setting for the 1987 novel, A Trumpet in the Wadi by Sami Michael and a 2002 award-winning film with the same name. It centers on the love story between a young Israeli Arab woman and a new Jewish immigrant from Russia.

== See also ==
- German Colony, Haifa
- Paris Square (Haifa)
- Wadi Salib
