= A Handful of Fog =

1979 novel by Sami Michael

First edition

A Handful of Fog (Hebrew: חופן של ערפל) is a 1979 novel by Sami Michael, published by Am Oved publishing house. The novel is about the communist underground in post-WWII Iraq, involving both Jews and Muslims. The book has been translated into German.
