= Sugar Street (novel) =

Novel by Naguib Mahfouz

- Author: Naguib Mahfouz
- Original title: السكرية
- Translator: William M. Hutchins, Olive E. Kenny, Angele Botros Samaan
- Language: Modern Standard Arabic
- Series: Cairo Trilogy
- Genre: Novel, family saga, historical fiction
- Set in: Cairo, 1935–1944
- Publisher: Maktabat Misr
- Publication date: 1957
- Publication place: Egypt
- English publication date: 1992
- Media type: Print (hardback & paperback)
- OCLC: 63163338
- Dewey Decimal: 892.736
- LC Class: PJ7846.A46 S913
- Preceded by: Palace of Desire

Sugar Street (Arabic: السكرية, romanized: as-Sukkariyya), first published in 1957, is the third novel in the Cairo Trilogy by Egyptian novelist Naguib Mahfouz. In this third novel, the protagonist Kamal, the youngest son of Ahmad 'Abd al-Jawad who is a young child in the first and a student in the second, is a teacher.

== Summary ==
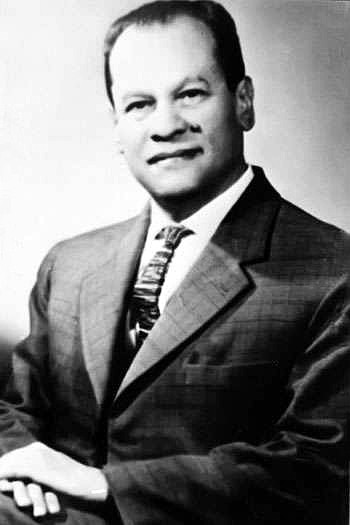
Author Naguib Mahfouz in the 1960s

The novel is set in the period between 1935 and into World War II. World and even national politics are in the background, including the rise of Egyptian nationalism in the 1930s and the official neutrality of Egypt during the war, though certain events in the novel are punctuated by history, such as the illness and death of Amina, the family's matriarch, during which a bombing raid takes place. Like the earlier novels, its location is the Gamaliya district of Cairo, Mahfouz's home district.

The family consists of Ahmad Abd al-Jawad's two sons, Yasin, a sensual man, and the younger and more studious Kamal; two daughters, the widow Aisha and the married Khadija, now a mother; and five grandchildren. Unmarried Kamal visits the same brothel his father used to go to, but the setting has shifted from the patriarchal home on Palace Walk to the house occupied by Khadija and her husband on Sugar Street. There, Khadija's two sons occupy opposite political positions: Abd al-Muni'm has started adhering to fundamental Islamic principles, while his brother Ahmad is becoming more and more involved with Communism, resulting in ongoing discussions about the current situation and the future of the country. One of Yasin's children is Ridwan, a gay civil servant under the protection of Pasha Isa; another is Karima, a young woman who awaits her fate: to be married.

The two nephews (the Marxist and the Islamist) form two distinct pathways toward Egypt's future, both headed toward violence. Kamal, who is modeled on the author, displays an intellectual and moral paralysis, a continuation of his trajectory in the earlier novels; he remains unable to reconcile Western ideals and Islamic thought or to handle the changes wrought by colonialism and World War II.

== Critical reception ==
According to the critic for Kirkus Reviews, this generation of the family "makes a more muted impression than the first two", and they place the writing "in the great tradition of the 19th-century novel from Balzac to Buddenbrooks. [Mahfouz's] trilogy shows just how rich and vital that tradition remains in the hands of a master."

Rania Mahmoud reads the novel as a Bildungsroman, but of an Egyptian kind which revises European forms and merges them with "local and global paradigms to fit the Egyptian socio-historical context". Mahmoud argues that Mahfouz does not accept either the traditional and European Bildungsroman nor the local classical traditions.

== Publication and translation ==
The novel was translated into English by William M. Hutchins, Olive Kenny, and Angele Botros Samaan; the translation was overseen by Jacqueline Kennedy Onassis, an editor at Doubleday at the time, and Martha Levin. The book was published by Doubleday in 1992.
