= Wadi Salib =

Neighborhood in Haifa, Israel

Coordinates: 32°48′40″N 35°0′0″E

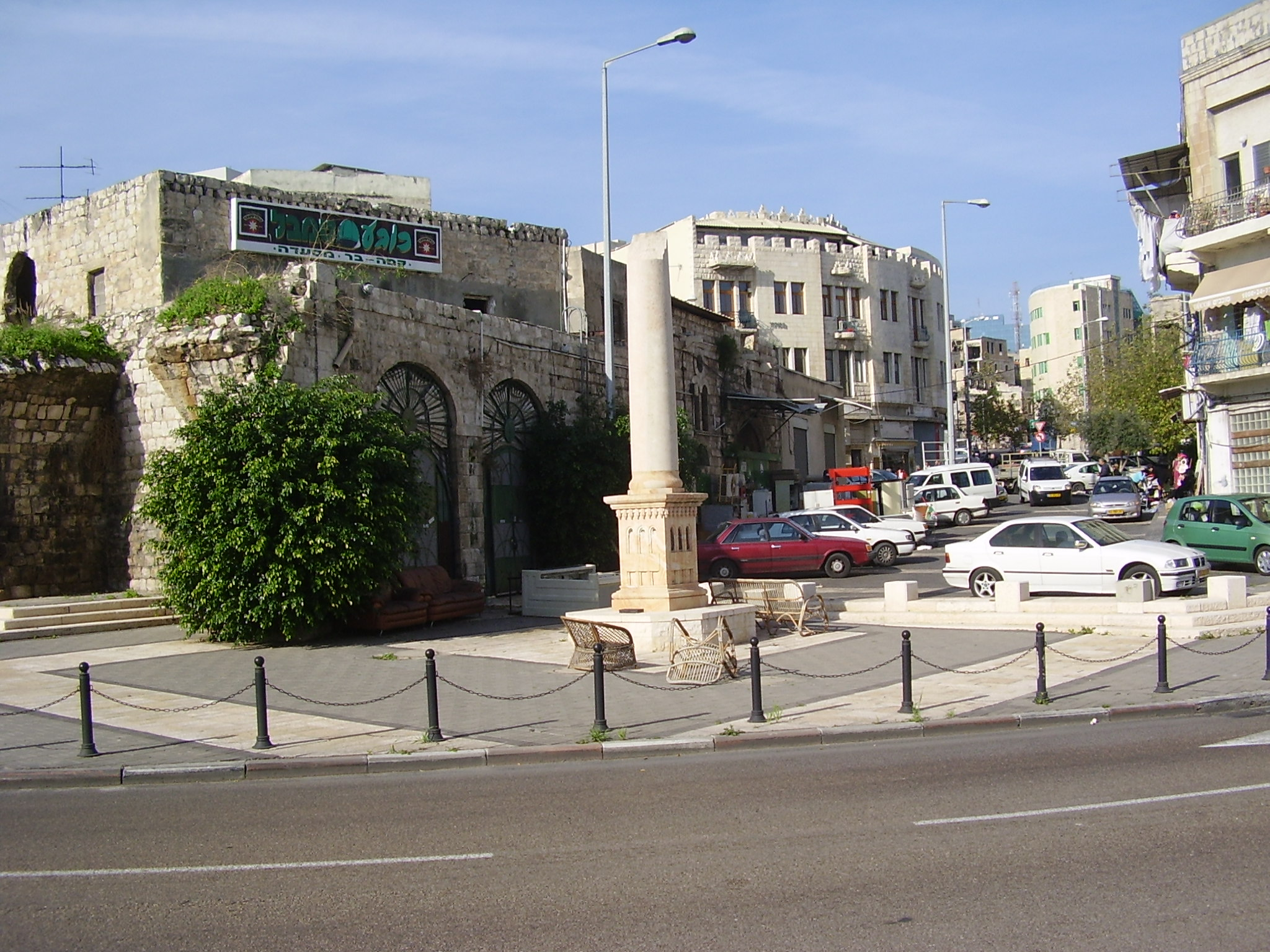
Faisal Square in Wadi Salib

Wadi Salib (Arabic: وادي صليب, Hebrew: ואדי סאליב; lit. Valley of the Cross) is a neighbourhood located in downtown Haifa, Israel, on the lower northeastern slope of Mount Carmel, between the Hadar HaCarmel and the city's historic center and CBD.

== History ==
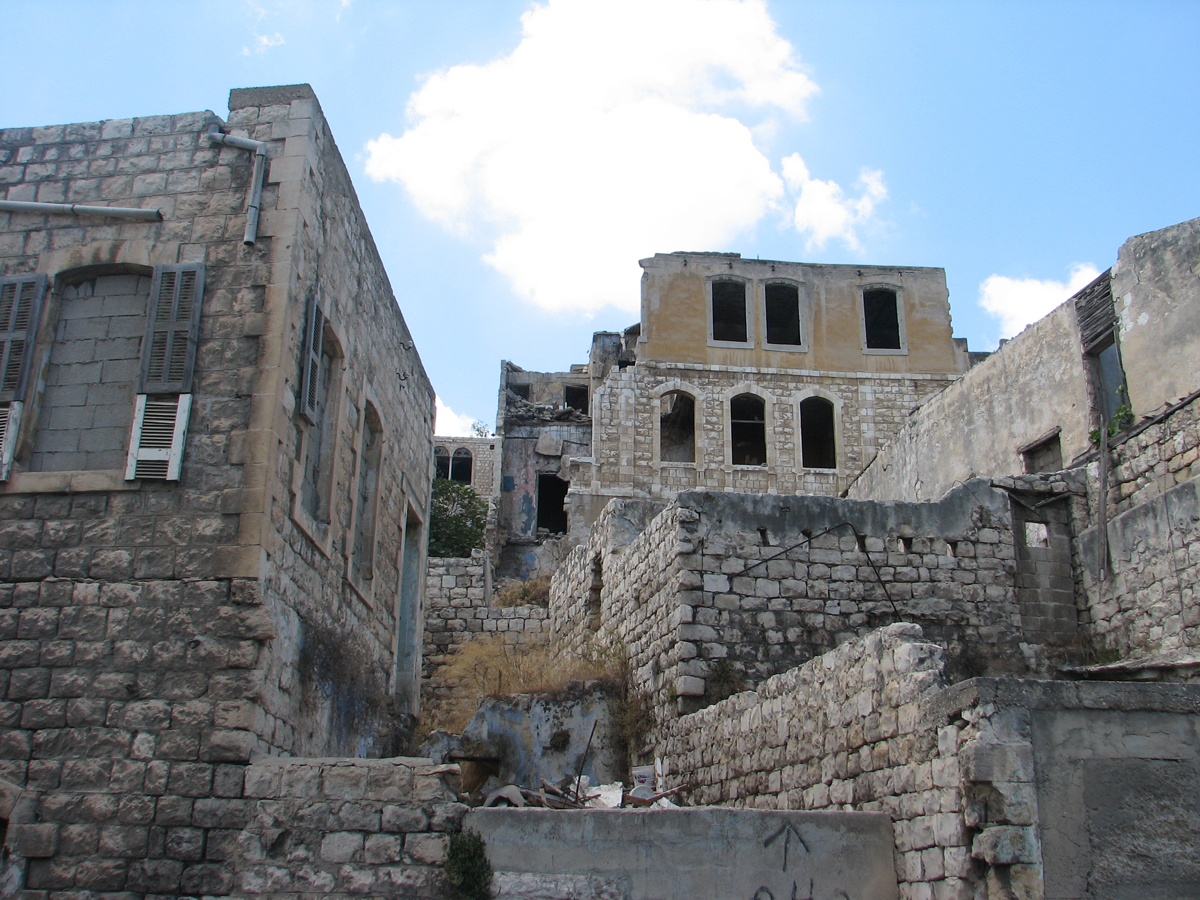
Old buildings in Wadi Salib

Wadi Salib was established near the old city walls in 1761, shortly after modern Haifa had been established by Zahir al-Umar. The neighborhood was populated by Muslim and Christian Arabs until the mid-nineteenth century, when development in Haifa began pushing outwards to other parts of the city.

After the arrival of Jewish residents in early 20th century, Wadi Salib and nearby Wadi Nisnas remained the important Arab neighborhoods in Haifa. In the 1930s and 1940s, both were sites of numerous riots over British rule and increased Jewish immigration to British Mandate Palestine.

With the fall of Haifa during the 1948 Palestine war, 60,000 Palestinian Arabs fled or were expelled from the city and few were permitted to return to their homes in Wadi Salib and other areas. Most of the buildings of Wadi Salib that had belonged to Palestinian refugees and internally displaced Palestinians were confiscated under the Absentee Property Law. The 3,000 Arabs remaining in the city were largely concentrated in the nearby neighborhood of Wadi Nisnas.

Between May 1948 and March 1949, about 24,000 immigrants, primarily Mizrachi Jews and survivors of the Holocaust, were settled in the former Arab quarters of Wadi Salib. Moroccan Jews were soon to follow.

=== Wadi Salib riots ===
On the evening of 8 July 1959, a Mizrahi Jewish resident of Wadi Salib was shot and wounded by police in the course of a brawl. The next day, hundreds of residents marched in what was to become the first of a series of violent demonstrations against the government, the Labor Party and the Histadrut around the country.

The riots in Wadi Salib awakened public awareness in Israel of the economic distress suffered by Jewish immigrants from the Arab countries. Newspapers of the time referred to the rioting as the "Moroccans' revolt." Arabs who moved back to Wadi Salib did not receive permits to build or renovate and the neighborhood became a slum. Yfaat Weiss of University of Haifa notes that "in the consciousness of the Israeli public, these Moroccan Jews and their history are associated with Wadi Salib, not the original Arab inhabitants."

In the wake of the riot, Ben Gurion appointed an education committee to draw up programs for the advancement of high school students from Arab and Muslim lands.

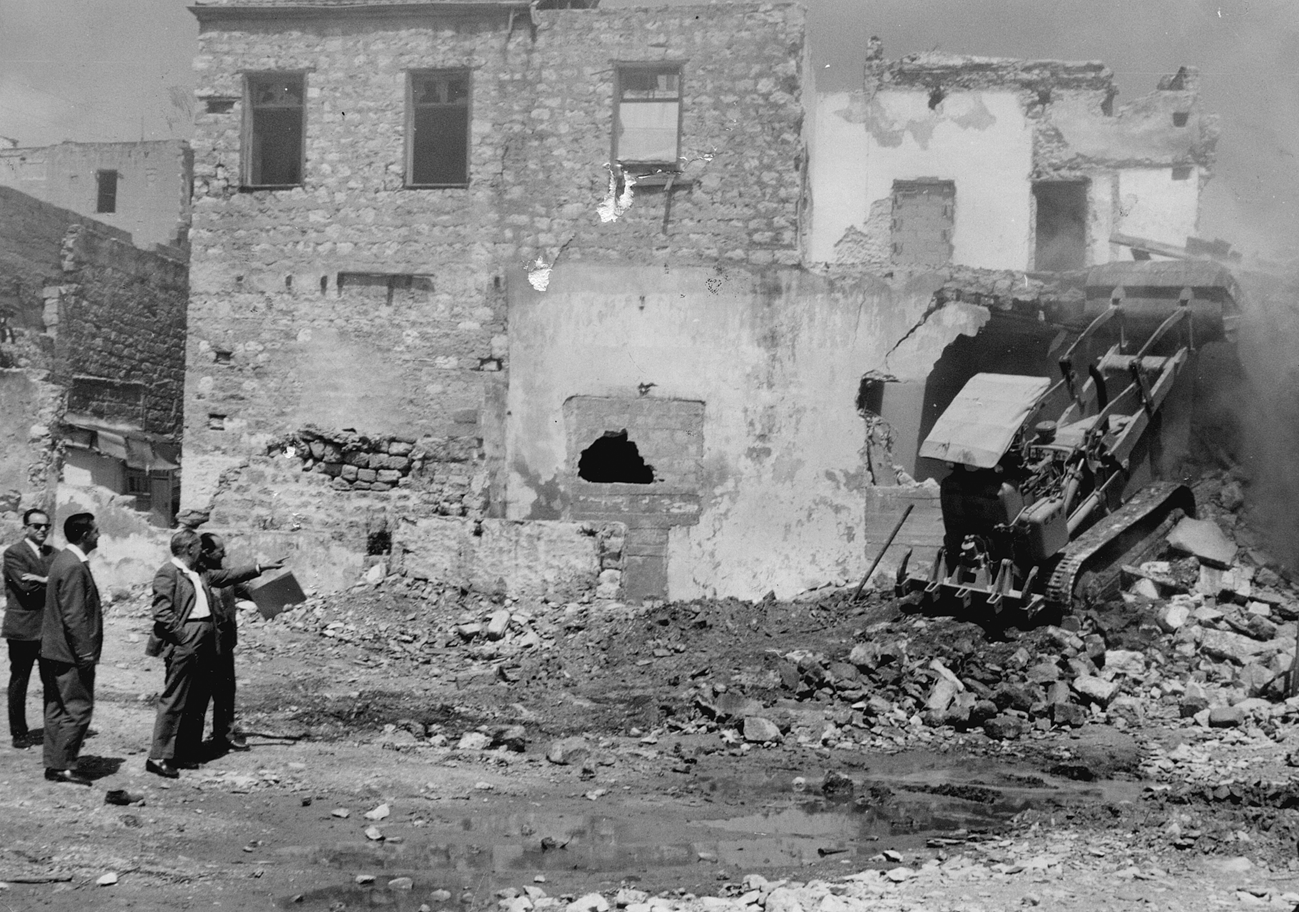
Buildings being demolished in Wadi Salib, 1964, while being overseen by then mayor of Haifa Abba Hushi

In the decade following the riots the Israeli government evacuated and relocated many of the residents of Wadi Salib. Most of the neighborhood's buildings were subsequently destroyed during the 1960s.

== Today ==
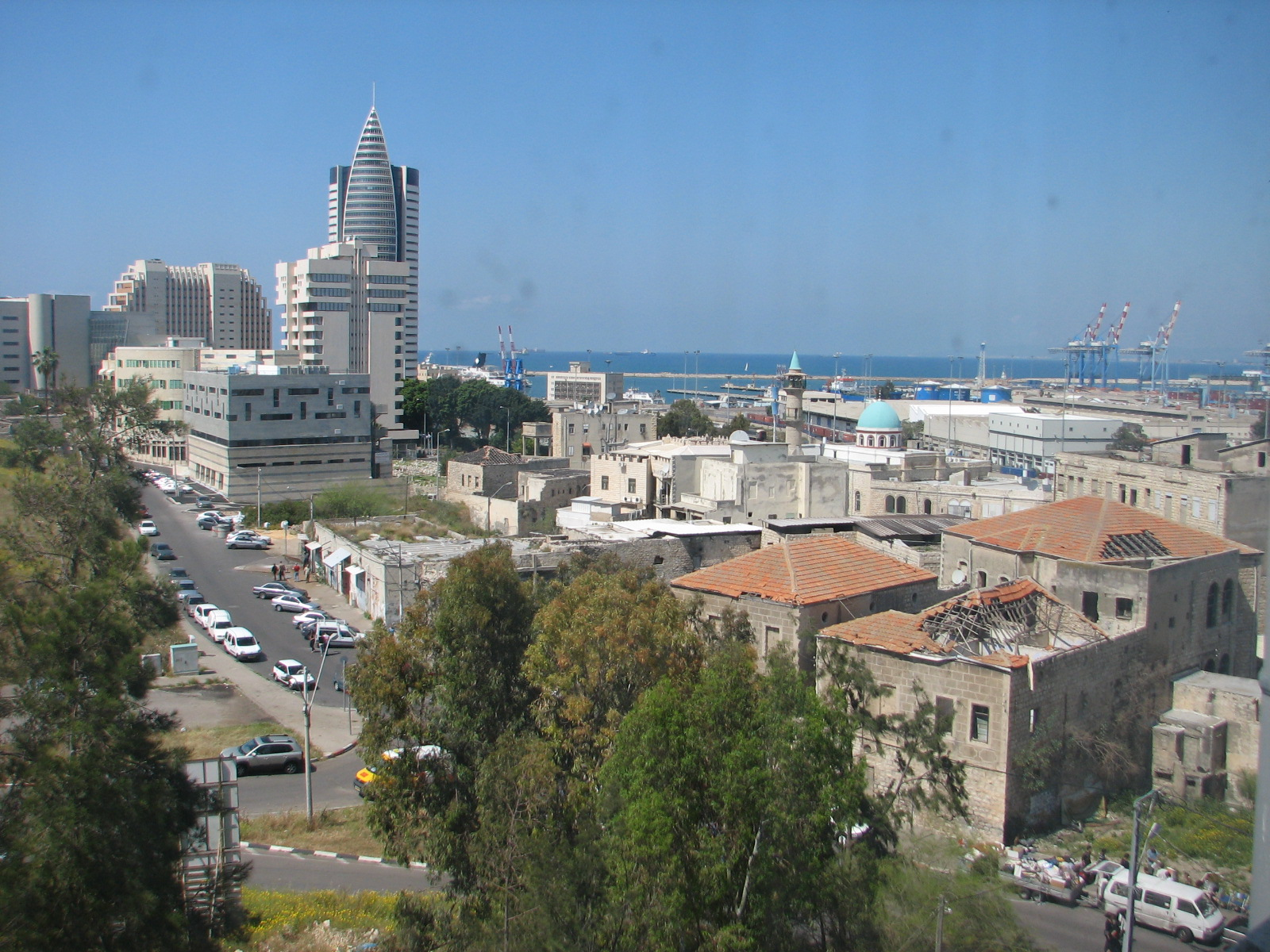
Wadi Salib view

Many residents of Wadi Salib, Jews and Arabs, are considered squatters and have been gradually evicted over the years. Some historic buildings are being renovated and turned into nightclubs and theaters. One is the Palace of the Pasha, built in Ottoman times. Adjacent is a Turkish bathhouse once used by local families. A building now occupied by an army veterans group was once an Oriental club that brought in musicians and dancers from Cairo.

The old Muslim cemetery in Wadi Salib has partially been uprooted and split in half to make way for a highway between Haifa and Nazareth, though the Istiklal mosque still operates in Wadi Salib.

=== Development plans ===
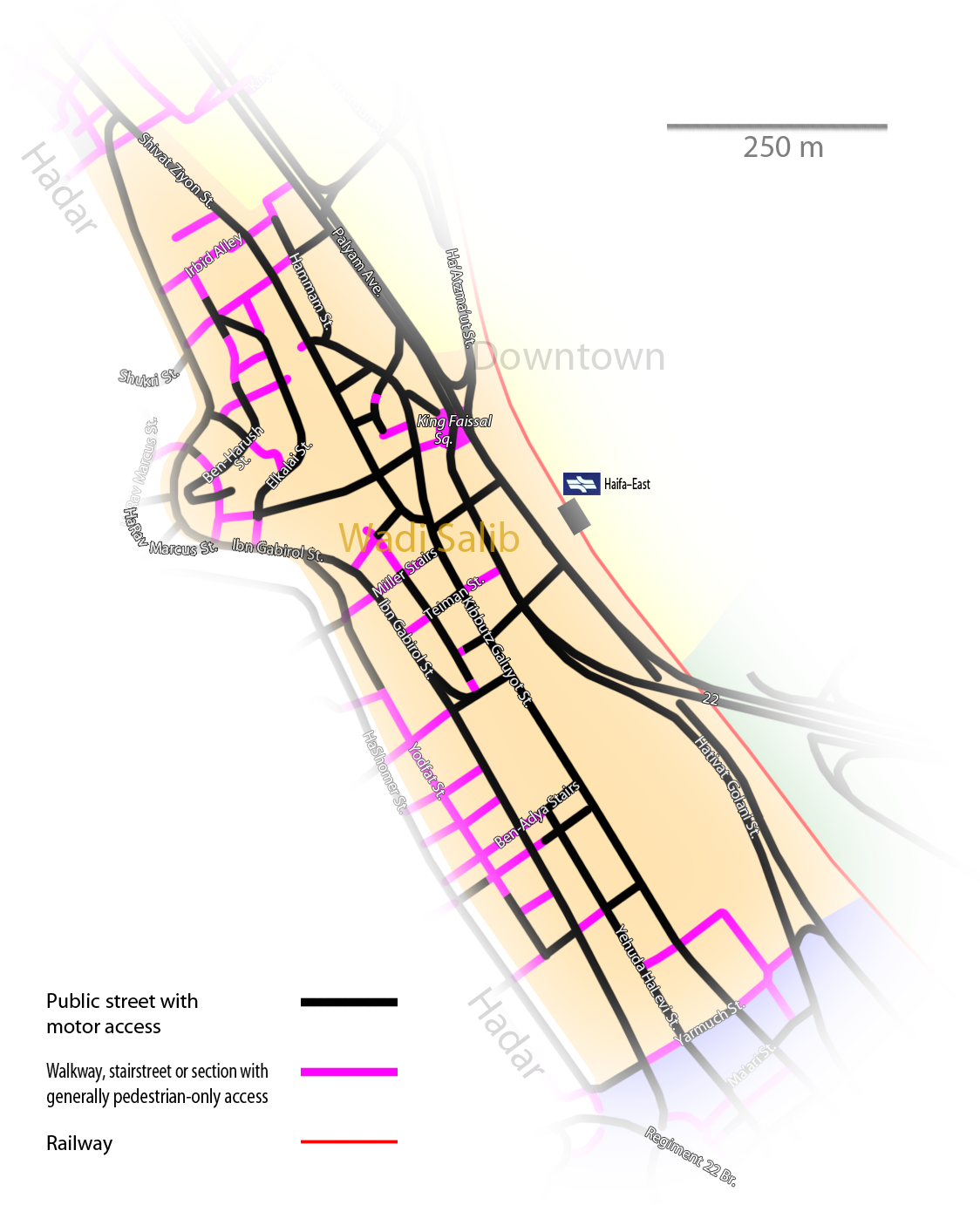
Map of neighborhood

The Haifa Economic Corporation Ltd., is implementing plans to develop two 1,000 square meter lots to create "a site for office and commercial use that accentuates size and is inspired by the spirit and ambiance of the place including Turkish and Arab construction elements." On their website, they note that "Wadi Salib in general and this initiative in particular are located in proximity to the new government center including the court house hall, Israel Land Administration building, and additional government offices."

The current project is controversial due to the eviction of the last remaining families from the neighborhood, and the planned demolition of buildings including the former home of Palestinian intellectual Emil Touma. Another government center built in the same area in the early 1990s - in which many historic buildings were demolished - failed to boost the economy as expected. In the new plan, a few of Wadi Salib's remaining buildings will be renovated; however the rest will be destroyed.

== Notable residents ==
- Eli Ohana (born 1964), football player and manager
