= Mahfuz (name) =

Mahfuz (Arabic: محفوظ, Harari: ማሕፉዝ, Bengali: মাহফুজ) is an Islamic masculine given name that may refer to:

- Mahfuz (died 1517), Emir of Harar, medieval Somali territory
- Mahfuz Ahmed (born 1967), Bangladeshi actor, presenter, model and producer
- Mahfuz Omar (born 1957), Malaysian politician
- Mahfuz Anam (born 1950), Bangladeshi editor and publisher
- Ahmad Mahfuz Umar (1936–2024), Yemeni writer
- Muhammad Mahfuz (1944–1971), Pakistani soldier

== Compound names including the element Mahfuz ==
- Mahfuzul Mamun Babu (born 1968), Bangladeshi footballer
- Mohammad Mahfuzul Islam (born 1973), vice-chancellor of Gazipur Digital University, Bangladesh
- Mahfuzul Hasan Bhuiyan (born 1975), Bangladeshi architectural photographer
- Syed Mahfuzul Aziz, vice-chancellor of BRAC University, Bangladesh
- Mahfuzur Rahman (disambiguation), multiple people
- Mahfuzul Haque (disambiguation), multiple people

== See also ==
- Mahfouz, a surname
