= Mahfuzur Rahman =

Mahfuzur Rahman (Bengali: মাহফুজুর রহমান) is a South Asian masculine given name of Arabic origin. Notable people with the name include:

- Mahfuzur Rahman (election commissioner) (1935–2016), Bangladesh High Court justice
- Mahfoozur Rahman Nami (1911–1963), Indian Islamic scholar, politician and author
- Abu Yousuf Mohammad Mahfuzur Rahman (1942–1981), Bangladeshi army officer
- Mahfuzur Rahman Khan (1949–2019), Bangladeshi cinematographer
- Muhammad Mahfuzur Rahman (born 1961), Bangladeshi military general
- Muhammad Mahfuzur Rahman (diplomat), Bangladeshi diplomat
- S. M. Mahfuzur Rahman, Bangladeshi academic, vice-chancellor of BGMEA University of Fashion & Technology
- Mahfuzur Rahaman Mita (born 1970), Bangladeshi politician
- Mahfuzur Rahman (umpire) (born 1973), Bangladeshi cricketer
- Mir Mahfuzur Rahman Mugdho (1998–2024), Bangladeshi student activist
- Mahfuzur Rahman Rabby (born 2005), Bangladeshi cricketer

== See also ==
- Mohammad Mahfizur Rahman, Bangladeshi swimmer
- Mahfuza Rahman Rina, Bangladeshi politician
- Mahfuz (name)
- Rahman (name)#Second half of compound name
