= A Trumpet in the Wadi =

1987 novel by Sami Michael

- Author: Sami Michael
- Original title: חצוצרה בוואדי
- Language: Hebrew
- Genre: Novel
- Publisher: Am Oved
- Publication date: 1987
- Publication place: Israel
- Pages: 270

A Trumpet in the Wadi (Hebrew: חצוצרה בוואדי, romanized: HaTzotzra BaVadi) is a 1987 novel by Sami Michael. It details a love story between a Russian Jewish immigrant and an Arab Christian woman in the Wadi Nisnas of Haifa.

The novel has been adapted for the stage five times in Israel, as well as for film in 2001 (2002 release). The film version won a number of awards.

A Trumpet in the Wadi has been translated into English (New York, Simon & Schuster 2003), Dutch (Amsterdam, 1996), German (Berlin, 1996, 2008), French (Paris, 2006), Italian (Florence, 2006), Persian (Los Angeles, 2006), and Chinese (Beijing, 2009).

The novel has won the WIZO Italy award for a Jewish novel.
