= Palace Walk =

Novel by Naguib Mahfouz

- 1988 Arabic edition
- Author: Naguib Mahfouz
- Original title: بين القصرين
- Translator: William M. Hutchins, Olive E. Kenny
- Language: Modern Standard Arabic
- Series: Cairo Trilogy
- Genre: Novel, family saga, historical fiction
- Set in: Cairo, 1917–19
- Publisher: Maktabat Misr
- Publication date: 1956
- Publication place: Egypt
- English publication date: 1990
- Media type: Print (Hardback & Paperback)
- Pages: 512 pp
- ISBN: 0-385-26466-6 (reissue)
- OCLC: 3229563
- Dewey Decimal: 892.736
- LC Class: PJ7846.A46 B313
- Followed by: Palace of Desire

Palace Walk (Arabic: بين القصرين, romanized: Bayn al-Quṣrayn, lit. 'Between Two Palaces') is a novel by Nobel Prize winning Egyptian writer Naguib Mahfouz, and the first installment of Mahfouz's Cairo Trilogy. Originally published in 1956 with the title Bayn al-qasrayn, the book was then translated into English by William M. Hutchins and Olive Kenny, and then published by Doubleday (publisher) in 1990. The book's Arabic title translates into 'between two palaces'. The setting of the novel is Cairo around the time period of World War I. It begins in 1917, during World War I, and ends in 1919, the year of the Egyptian Revolution of 1919. The novel is written in a social realist style and reflects the social and political setting of Egypt during 1917 to 1919.

== Plot summary ==
The novel follows al-Sayyid Ahmad Abd al-Jawad as the head of his household; his wife, Amina; his sons, Yasin, Fahmy and Kamal, and his daughters, Khadija and Aisha. He sets strict rules of Muslim piety and sobriety in the household. al-Sayyid Ahmad permits himself conventionally forbidden pleasures. In particular, these include music, drinking wine and conducting numerous extramarital affairs with women he meets at his grocery store, or with courtesans who entertain parties of men at their houses with music and dancing. His insistence on his household authority forbids his wife and children from questioning why he stays out late at night or comes home intoxicated.

The family house, in Cairo's Gamaliya district, is in the exact location of the Beshtak Palace.

Yasin, the eldest son, is al-Sayyid Ahmad's only child by his first marriage, to a woman whose subsequent marital affairs are the source of acute embarrassment to father and son. Yasin shares his father's good looks, and, unbeknownst to al-Sayyid Ahmad, Yasin also shares his tastes for music, women and alcohol, and spends as much time and money as he can afford on fine clothes, drink and prostitutes. Fahmy, Amina's elder son, is a law student, who is heavily involved in the nationalist movement against the British occupation; he also pines for his neighbor, Maryam, but cannot bring himself to take any action. Khadija, the elder daughter, is sharp-tongued, opinionated, and jealous of her sister Aisha, who is considered to be the more beautiful and marriageable. Aisha, meanwhile, is more mellow and conciliatory, and tries to maintain peace. Kamal, the baby of the family, is a bright young boy who frightens his family by befriending the British soldiers who have set up an encampment across the street from the Abd al-Jawad house; he is also very close with his mother and his sisters, and is deeply dismayed when the prospect of marriage for the girls arises.

Major elements of the plot include al-Sayyid Ahmad's philandering, Yasin's cultivation of the same hobbies, Fahmy's refusal to cease his political activities despite his father's order, and the day-to-day stresses of living in the Abd al-Jawad house, in which the wife and children must delicately negotiate certain issues of sexual chastity and comportment that cannot be discussed openly. Through the novel, Yasin and Fahmy gradually become aware of the exact nature of their father's nighttime activities, largely because Yasin begins an affair with a young courtesan who works in the same house as al-Sayyid Ahmad's lover. After glimpsing his father playing the tambourine at a gathering in the house Yasin understands where his father goes at night, and is pleased to find that they have similar interests. Amina, meanwhile, has long ago guessed her husband's predilections, but represses her resentment and grief so intensely that she behaves almost wilfully ignorant of the whole matter.

The family provides the novel with its structure, since the plot is concerned with the lives and interrelationships of its members. However, the story is not set in isolation; indeed, the characters themselves are important mediators between issues of local or wider scope. For example, the theme of 'authority' (particularly its establishment and subversion) is woven into both the maturation of the children of the al-Jawad family and the wider political circumstances which provide the novel with its temporal boundaries.

The novel's opening chapters focus upon the daily routine of the al-Jawad family. Amina, the mother of the family, greets the return of her husband, al-Sayyid Ahmad, from his late-night socialising. She rises once again at dawn to begin preparing food, assisted by her daughters Khadija and Aisha. Her sons join their father for breakfast. At this meal, as with any other dealing with the patriarch, strict etiquette is observed. The following chapters describe the characters of the family members and their relationships with each other. At the same time, the children's marriage is a challenge to the supreme authority of the family patriarch.

== Key incidents ==
When al-Sayyid Ahmad goes on a business trip to Port Said for a few days, Amina's children convince her to take the opportunity to leave the house and go to pray at Al-Hussein Mosque. On the way back, Amina faints in the road due to the heat and is glancingly struck by a car, and fractures her collarbone; her children must fetch a doctor to come and set the bone. When al-Sayyid Ahmad discovers that she left the house without his permission, he waits until the bone has healed, and then exiles her from the house for some weeks, forcing her to live at her mother's house.

Negotiations for the engagement commence while Amina is in exile from the house; al-Sayyid Ahmad's desire to inform his wife of the arrangement contributes to his decision to bring her home. The wedding also fulfills the fears of Khadija in that her younger sister is the first to marry, but the removal of Aisha from the Abd al-Jawad household actually ends the long-running jealousy between them. In addition, the hired entertainment for the party is the singer Jalila, who is a recent former lover of al-Sayyid Ahmad. During the party, she openly consumes wine, and when she is drunk, she broadly hints to the crowd of this past relationship, and scandalously confronts al-Sayyid Ahmad to express her unhappiness at his taking up with a younger competing singer—the one whom Yasin saw at his lover's house shortly before. Yasin takes the opportunity to explain to Fahmy all that he has seen at the singers' house, revealing to his emotionally naïve younger brother the truth of their father's hedonism. Unlike his brother, Fahmy is deeply shaken to lose his idealized picture of his father, and takes no joy in the knowledge. Following the wedding, Yasin, who has gotten drunk on wine at the groom's table, is overcome by desire and attempts to force himself on the household servant, Umm Hanafi. When the servant screams in protest, al-Sayyid Ahmad investigates and discovers Yasin, and furiously drags him away. As a result of Yasin's behavior, al-Sayyid Ahmad decides to marry him off to the daughter of an old friend, in hopes of finding an appropriate sexual outlet for him and keeping him from further trouble.

Later in the book, following the November Armistice which ended World War I, political unrest begins to surface. The 'middle' son, Fahmy, an aspiring and idealistic law student, is drawn into nationalist demonstrations. His militant attitude towards the British occupation. For the other family members, however, this unrest constitutes a time of fear and trepidation, not hope or excitement. The encampment of British soldiers directly outside the Abd al-Jawad house directly juxtaposes the two peoples, and symbolises the uncomfortable and tense atmosphere created by British military rule.
