= Hong Kong Mint =

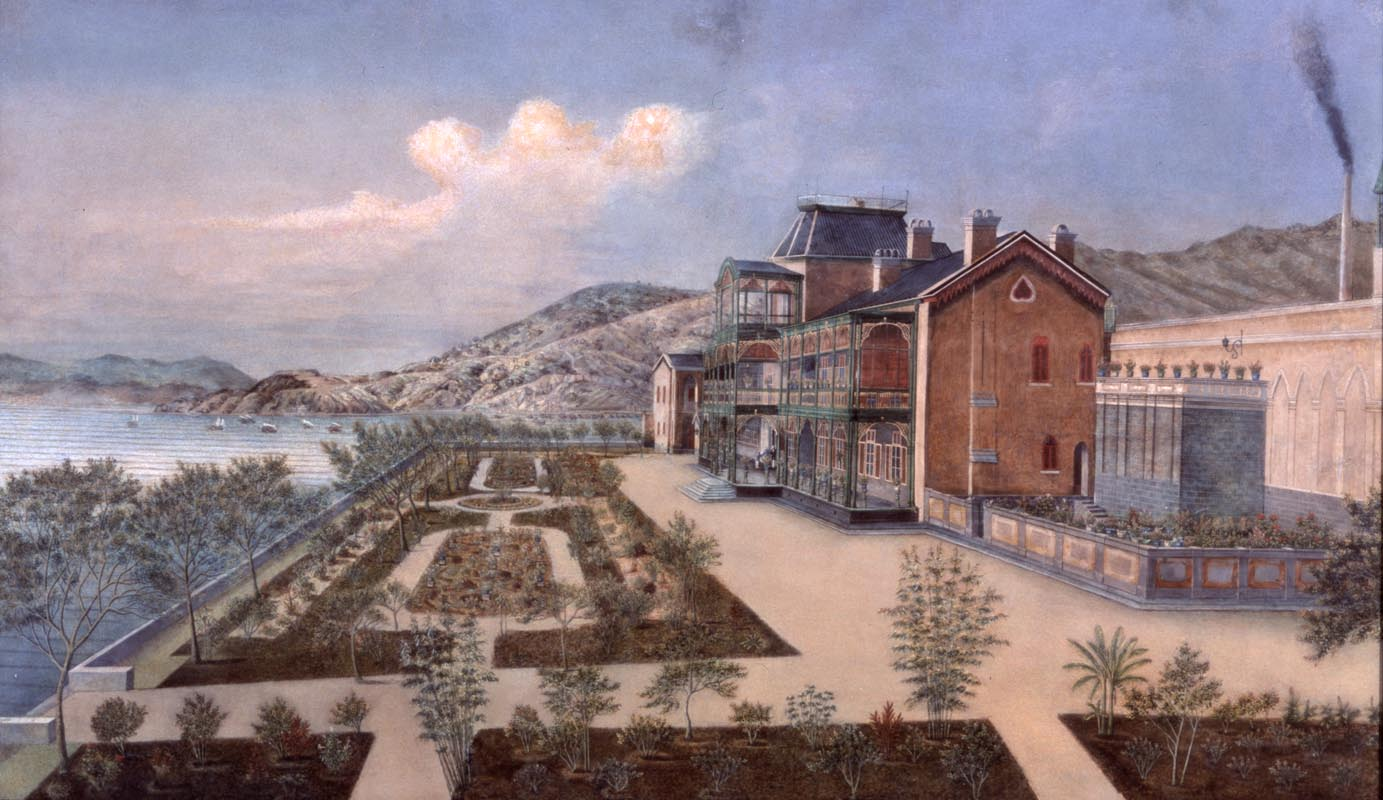
- Industry: Metalworking
- Founded: 1866; 160 years ago
- Defunct: 1868
- Headquarters: Hong Kong, British Hong Kong
- Area served: Hong Kong
- Products: coins

Hong Kong Mint (Chinese: 香港造幣廠) was a mint in Hong Kong that existed from 1866 to 1868. Located in Cleveland Street, Causeway Bay, it is the first coin mint of Hong Kong. A Mint Dam, on the slope of Mount Butler, was constructed to supply water to the mint.

In early colonial Hong Kong, mixed currencies of various kinds were used. Although sterling was the official currency, it was not well accepted by the merchants and residents, especially Chinese, in Hong Kong. Various silver currencies remained the medium of trade in the city.

To provide a steady supply of silver dollars in Hong Kong, Hercules Robinson, the then-Hong Kong governor, decided to found the Hong Kong Mint in 1864. The mint opened on 7 May 1866 under the direction of the master of the mint, Thomas William Kinder, but closed in 1868 during Richard MacDonnell's governorship. The reasons for this were the poor reception of the coins as well as continued debasement of the silver coins causing huge loss. The site was sold to Jardine Matheson in 1868 and the mint machinery sold to the newly established Japan Mint in Osaka.

== See also ==
- Hong Kong dollar
- Sugar Street
