= Cleveland Street, Hong Kong =

Street in Hong Kong

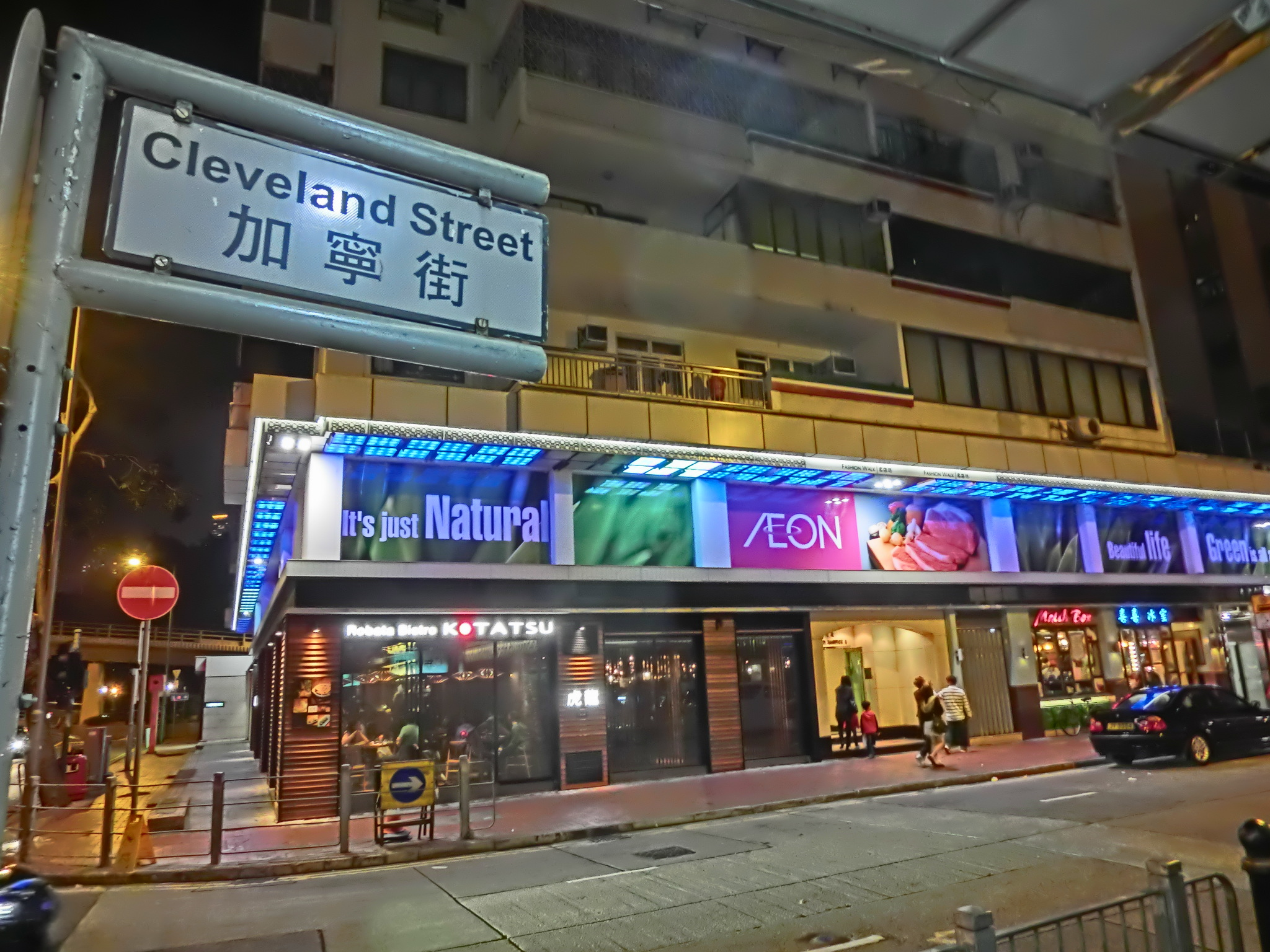
Cleveland Street

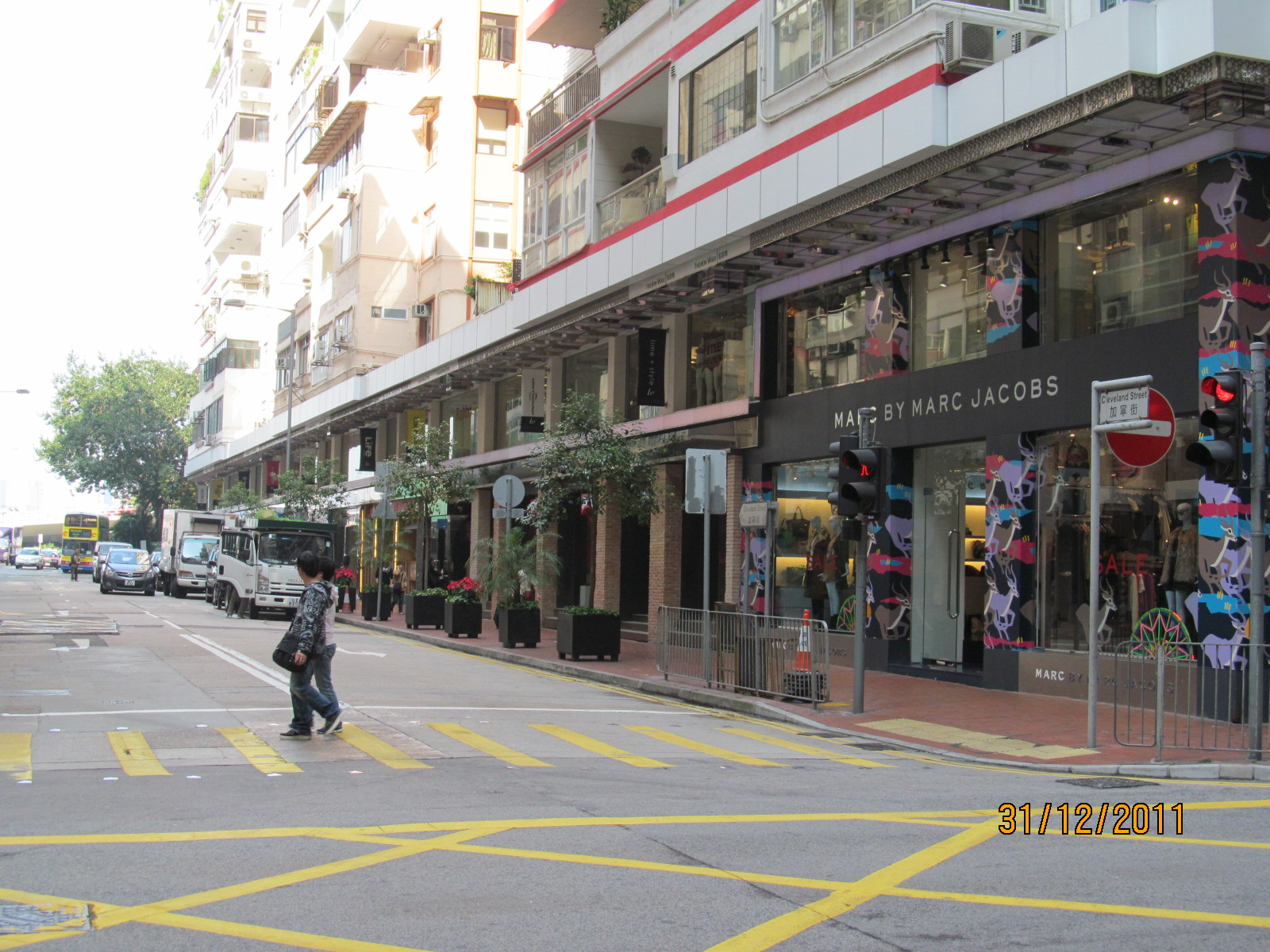
Cleverland Street

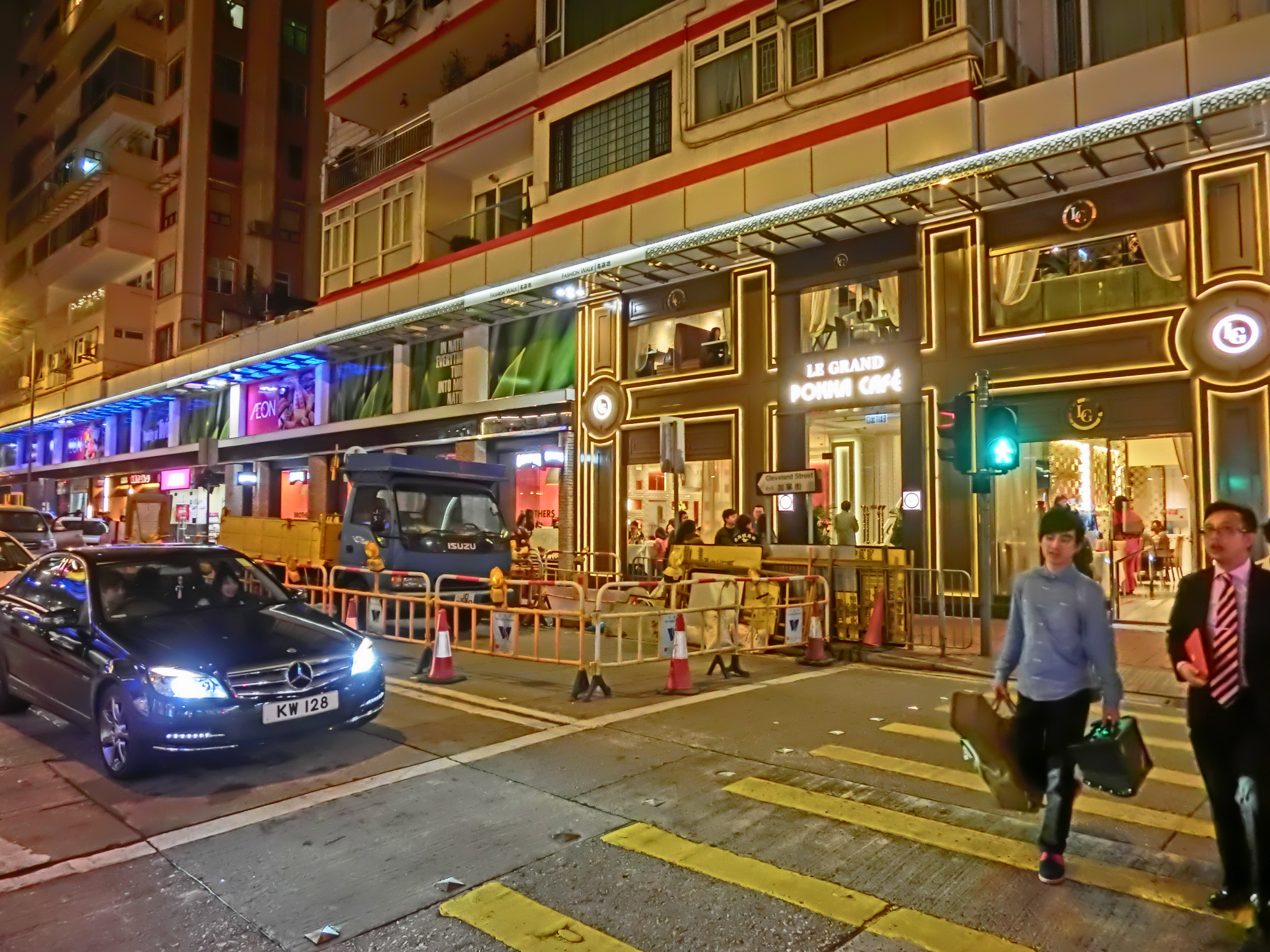
Cleveland Street at night

Cleveland Street (Chinese: 加寧街; Jyutping: gaa1 ning4 gaai1) is a one-way southbound road in Causeway Bay, Wan Chai District, Hong Kong Island. It starts from the junction of Victoria Park Road and Gloucester Road in the north, passes through Newtown Mansion and Cleveland Mansion, and ends at Kingston Street near Paterson Street in the south.

== History ==
In 1864, the Hong Kong government proposed to set up the Hong Kong Mint to mint coins, and it officially opened in 1866. The mint was located at the junction of Kingston Street, Cleveland Street and Gloucester Road. It was in operation for only two years and was shut down in 1868 during Richard MacDonnell's governorship because of financially infeasible. The site was sold to Jardine Matheson in 1868 and the mint machinery sold to the newly established Japan Mint in Osaka.

In 1878, Jardine Matheson opened a sugar factory on the former mint site, but the factory ceased production after the war. Jardine Matheson's East Point warehouse was originally located on Hennessy Road near Percival Street and Canal Road. In the 1930s, the warehouse was extended to East Point Road and Lockhart Road. In the mid-1950s, the warehouse was closed and several residential buildings were built on the land, opening up Paterson Street, Kingston Street and Cleveland Street.
