= Mahfuzul Haque (disambiguation) =

Mahfuzul Haque is a Bengali masculine given name of Arabic origin, meaning "trustee of the truth". Notable bearers of the name include:

- Mufti Mahfuzul Haque (born 1969), Bangladeshi Islamic scholar
- Mahfuzul Huq, East Pakistani politician
- Quazi Mahfujul Haque Supan, professor of law

== See also ==
- Mahfuz (name)
- Haqq (surname)
