= All Men are Equal – But Some are More =

First edition (publ. בוסתן)

All Men are Equal – But Some are More (Hebrew: שווים ושווים יותר Shavim ve-Shavim Yoter) is a novel by Sami Michael, published in 1974 by Bustan publishing house. The novel is about the lives of immigrants in transit camps in Israel in the 1950s. This title became a well-known phrase depicting the struggles for equality of Jews from Arab countries and opened the door for profound discussion about the socio-economic gaps in Israel and also about the situation of the Arabs in Israel.

The story presents a sector of Israeli society during the first years of the state. It reviews and denominates phenomena that have received little prior critical review.
