= Angele Botros Samaan =

Egyptian academic and translator

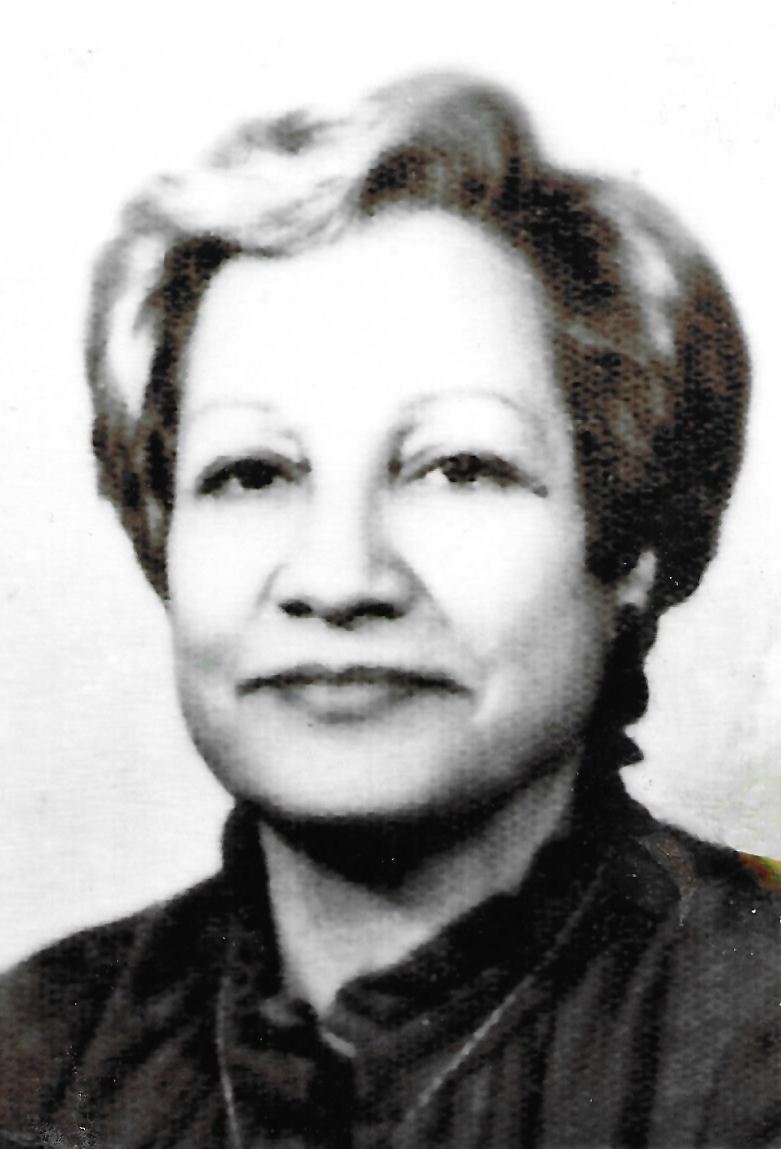
- Born: 3 October 1923; Marsa Matrouh (Egypt)
- Died: 22 November 2011 (aged 88); Cairo (Egypt)
- Occupations: Academic; critic; writer; translator
- Known for: Translation of Sugar Street, by Naguib Mahfouz and Thomas More's Utopia
- Spouse: Girgis El-Rashidi
- Children: Amani El-Rashidi

Academic background
- Education: PhD in English Literature from London University in 1962

Angele Botros Samaan (1923 – 2011) was an Egyptian academic and translator.

== Biography ==
Dr Angele Botros Samaan was born the 3rd of October 1923 in Marsa Matrouh (Egypt) and she died the 22nd of November 2011 in Cairo. She obtained a BA (with Honours) and MA degree from the Faculty of Arts Department of English Literature and Language in Cairo University. She obtained her PhD from London University in 1962, with a thesis untitled The Novel of Utopianism and Prophecy From Lytton (1871) to Orwell (1949) With Special Reference to Its Reception. Her supervisor was Professor Tillotson. She then returned to Cairo and worked at Cairo University for many years in the Department of English Literature and Language. She specialized in the English novel starting from the 19th century until modern novel. She supervised many Masters and PhD theses.

She published critical articles in Egypt and abroad in the areas of the English novel, particularly the modern novel, the Arabic and African novel in addition to Utopian writings, translation and women studies both in English and Arabic.

She is best known as the co-translator of Sugar Street, the third volume of the Cairo Trilogy by Egyptian Nobel laureate Naguib Mahfouz. She also translated Chinua Achebe's Things Fall Apart and Thomas More's Utopia from English to Arabic. A new edition of this last translation was published in 2021 by Al-Mada, Baghdad, Iraq.

Dr Angele Botros Samaan was member of the Shura Council ("consultative council", the upper house of the formerly bicameral Parliament of Egypt), 1983 - 1989, and member of the National Assembly. She was also member of the Translation Committee of the Supreme Council for Culture, the International Society of Friends of Thomas More (Amici Thomae Mori), the Board of the University Women Association in Cairo, the Egyptian Women Writers' Association, and Egypt correspondent of the International Association of University Professors of English (IAUPE).

A festschrift in her honour was published in 1995, under the title Essays in Honour of Angele B. Samaan.

== Publications ==
=== In Arabic ===
- Bayn al-riwā’i wa al-riwāyah (The Novel and the Novelist), Anglo-Egyptian Bookshop, Cairo 1972
- The English Novel, 1977
- Studies in the English Novel, 1981
- Studies in the Arabic Novel, 1987

=== In English ===
- Views on the art of the Novel, Anglo-Egyptian Bookshop, Cairo 1965
- C.S. Lewis: The Utopianist and His Critics, 1966, Cairo Studies in English pp. 137–166
- Critical introductions to : Joseph Conrad, Heart of Darkness, 1970
- Utopias and Utopian Novels, 1516-1949, A Preliminary Bibliography, Moreana, Angers, Nov. 1971
- James Joyce, A portrait of the Artist as A Young Man, 1977, 1987
- The English novel in Arabic Translation: 1940-1973, A preliminary Bibliography, « Bulletin of the Faculty of Arts, Cairo University, XXXII, 1978, pp. 85–128
- Essay on George Eliot The Developing Image of the Heroine, Centenary Essays on George Eliot. Ed. Magdi Wahba. Cairo: Cairo Studies in English, 1981. pp. 119–174.
- News From Egypt, Moreana XIX, pp. 75–76 (Nov.1982), p. 111-112
- Death and the Death-Penalty in More’s Utopia and Some Utopian Novels, Moreana 23.90 (June 1986): pp. 5–15
- D.H. Lawrence, Sons and Lovers, 1990
- Arabic Literature in Egypt in English Translation : A Bibliography, Compiled by Angele Botros Samaan
- Women in Society : Egypt, Singapore Times Publishing, 1993
- A voice of their Own: Short Stories by Egyptian Women, Cairo:Prism Publications, Prism Literary Series #4, Published by Foreign Cultural Information Dept. 1994, 1998
- Review in Utopian Studies, vol. 6, no. 1, 1995, pp. 121–123.

=== Translations into Arabic ===
- Chinua Achebe, Things Fall Apart, 1971
- Thomas More, Utopia, trans.Yūtubyā or Ūtūbyah, ed. Cairo: Dar el-Maaref, 1974, 1987, 2021

=== Translations into English ===
- Nehad Gad, Adila and The Bus Stop : Two One-Act Plays, General Egyptian Book Organization, Cairo, 1987
- Naguib Mahfouz, Al-Sukkaria (Sugar Street), 1992

== See also ==
- List of Arabic-English translators
