= Palace of Desire (novel) =

1957 novel by Naguib Mahfouz

- Author: Naguib Mahfouz
- Original title: قصر الشوق
- Translator: William M. Hutchins, Olive E. Kenny, Lorne Kenny
- Language: Modern Standard Arabic
- Series: Cairo Trilogy
- Genre: Novel, family saga, historical fiction
- Set in: Cairo, 1924–27
- Publisher: Maktabat Misr
- Publication date: 1957
- Publication place: Egypt
- English publication date: 1991
- Media type: Print (hardback & paperback)
- OCLC: 732293340
- Dewey Decimal: 892.736
- LC Class: PJ7846.A46 Q313
- Preceded by: Palace Walk
- Followed by: Sugar Street

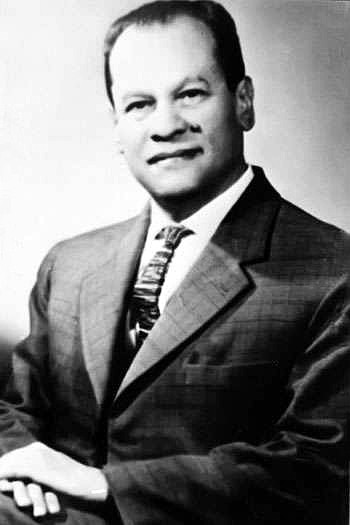
Author Naguib Mahfouz in the 1960s

Palace of Desire (Arabic: قصر الشوق, romanized: Qaṣr ash-Shūq) is a novel by Egyptian writer Naguib Mahfouz, and the second installment of Mahfouz's Cairo Trilogy. It was originally published in Arabic in 1957.
