= Cairo Trilogy =

1956–1957 Three novels by Nagib Mahfuz

- Author: Naguib Mahfouz
- Original title: ثلاثية القاهرة
- Translator: William M. Hutchins, Olive Kenny, Lorne Kenny, Angele Botros Samaan
- Country: Egypt
- Language: Modern Standard Arabic
- Genre: novel, family saga
- Published: 1956–1957
- Published in English: 1990–1992
- No. of books: 3

The Cairo Trilogy (Arabic: الثلاثية ath-thulathia ('The Trilogy') or ثلاثية القاهرة thulathia al-Qahra) is a trilogy of novels written by the Egyptian novelist and Nobel Prize in Literature winner Naguib Mahfouz, and one of the major works of his literary career.

The three novels are Palace Walk (بين القصرين, Bayn al-Qasrayn), first Arabic publication 1956; Palace of Desire (قصر الشوق, Qasr al-Shawq), 1957; and Sugar Street (السكرية, Al-Sukkariyya), 1957.

== Titles ==
The three novels' Arabic titles are taken from the names of actual streets in Cairo, the city of Mahfouz's childhood and youth. The first novel, Bayn al-Qasrayn, is named after the medieval Cairo street in the Gamaliya district where the strict socially conservative protagonist, Ahmad 'Abd al-Jawad, and his family live. The second novel, Qasr al-Shawq, is named after the street where his eldest son Yasin and his family live, and the third, Al-Sukkariyya, is named after the street where his daughter Khadijah and her family live.

== Narrative ==
The trilogy follows the life of the Cairene patriarch Al-Sayyid (Mr.) Ahmad 'Abd al-Jawad and his family across three generations, from 1919 – the year of Egyptian Revolution against the British colonizers ruling Egypt – to almost the end of the Second World War in 1944. The three novels represent three eras of Cairene socio-political life, a microcosm of early 20th century Egypt, through the life of one well-off Cairo merchant, his children and his grandchildren.

To Kamal, 'Abd al-Jawad's youngest son, Mahfouz admits that he gives him some features of himself, as they both got a BA in philosophy from what is now the University of Cairo and have problems with profound contradictions they discern between religious principles and the scientific discoveries of the West.

Seen as a child in the first novel, a university student in the second, and a teacher, not married, in the third, Kamal loses his faith in religion, in love, and in traditions and lives in the second and third novels as an outsider in his own society. He keeps searching for the meaning of his life until the last scene, in which Kamal's attitude to life changes to the positive as he starts to see himself as 'idealistic' teacher, future husband and revolutionary man.

Mahfouz sees the development of society as an important influence on the role of women. He represents the traditional, obedient women who do not go to school such as Amina, 'Abd al-Jawad's wife, and her daughters in the first novel; women as students in the university such as Aida, Kamal's beloved, in the second novel; and women as students in the university, members of the Marxist party and editors of the journal of the party in the third novel.

Throughout the trilogy, Mahfouz develops his theme: social progress will be the inevitable result of the evolutionary spirit of humankind. Time is the major leitmotif in all three books, and its passage is marked in literal and symbolic ways, from the daily pounding of bread dough in the morning, which serves as an alarm clock for the family, to the hourly calls for prayers that ring out from the minarets of Cairo. In the first novel time moves slowly; this story belongs to Kamal, still a child. The permanence of childhood is pronounced, and the minutes often tick by like hours. And yet inevitable changes occur: sisters get married, babies are born, grandparents die, life goes on. The passage of time quickens in the following book, and doubles yet again in the third. By the time the trilogy concludes whole years seem to fly by to the middle-aged Kamal.

== Translations ==
The English translation was published by Doubleday in the early 1990s. The translators were:

- Palace Walk - William M. Hutchins and Olive Kenny
- Palace of Desire - Hutchins, Olive Kenny and Lorne Kenny
- Sugar Street - Hutchins, Olive Kenny and Angele Botros Samaan

The translation was overseen by Jacqueline Kennedy Onassis, an editor at Doubleday at the time, and Martha Levin.
