= Halisa =

Neighbourhood in Haifa, Israel

Coordinates: 32°47′56″N 35°0′41″E

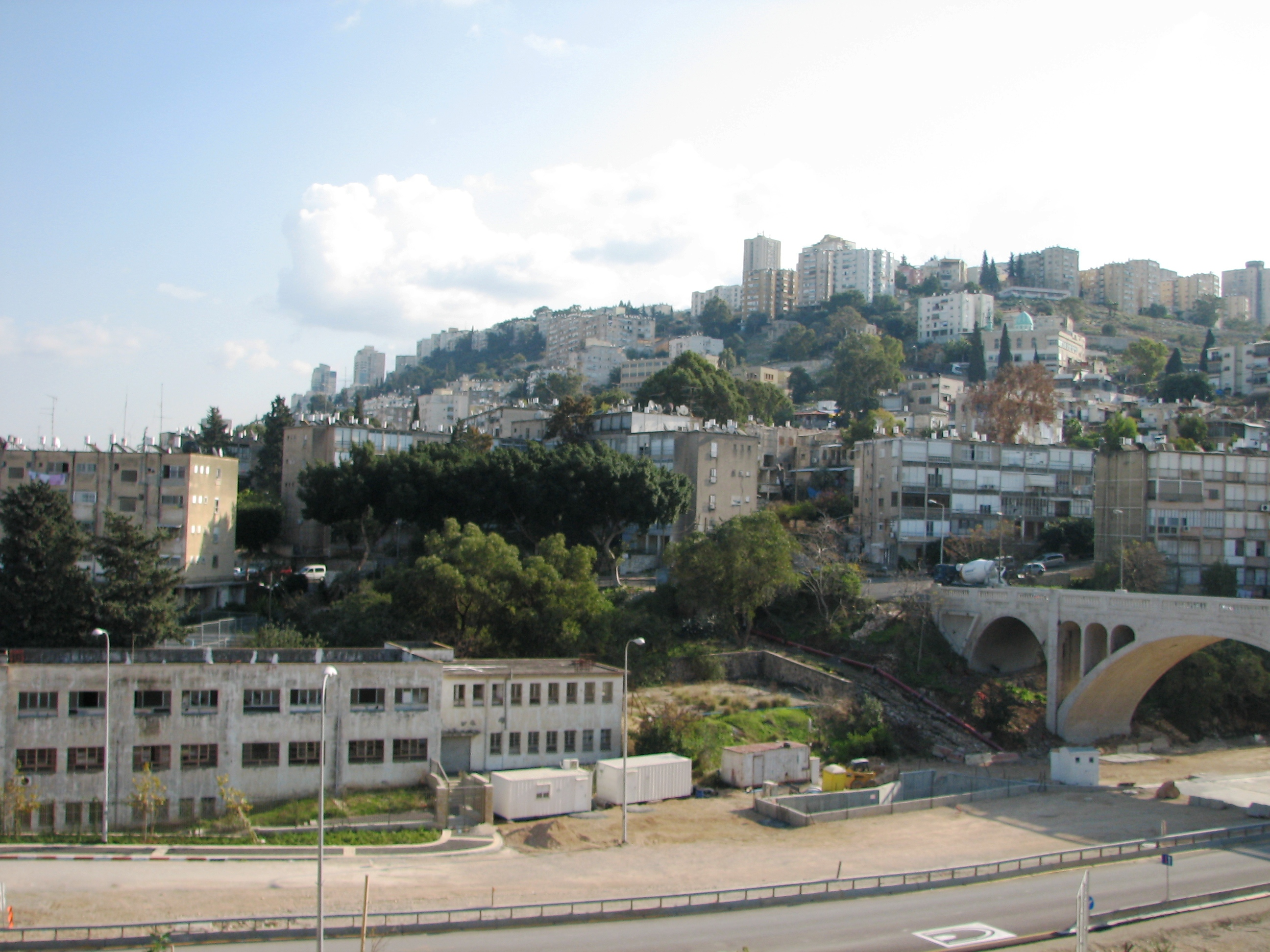
View of Halisa with Rushmiya Bridge in the foreground and Tel Amal in the background

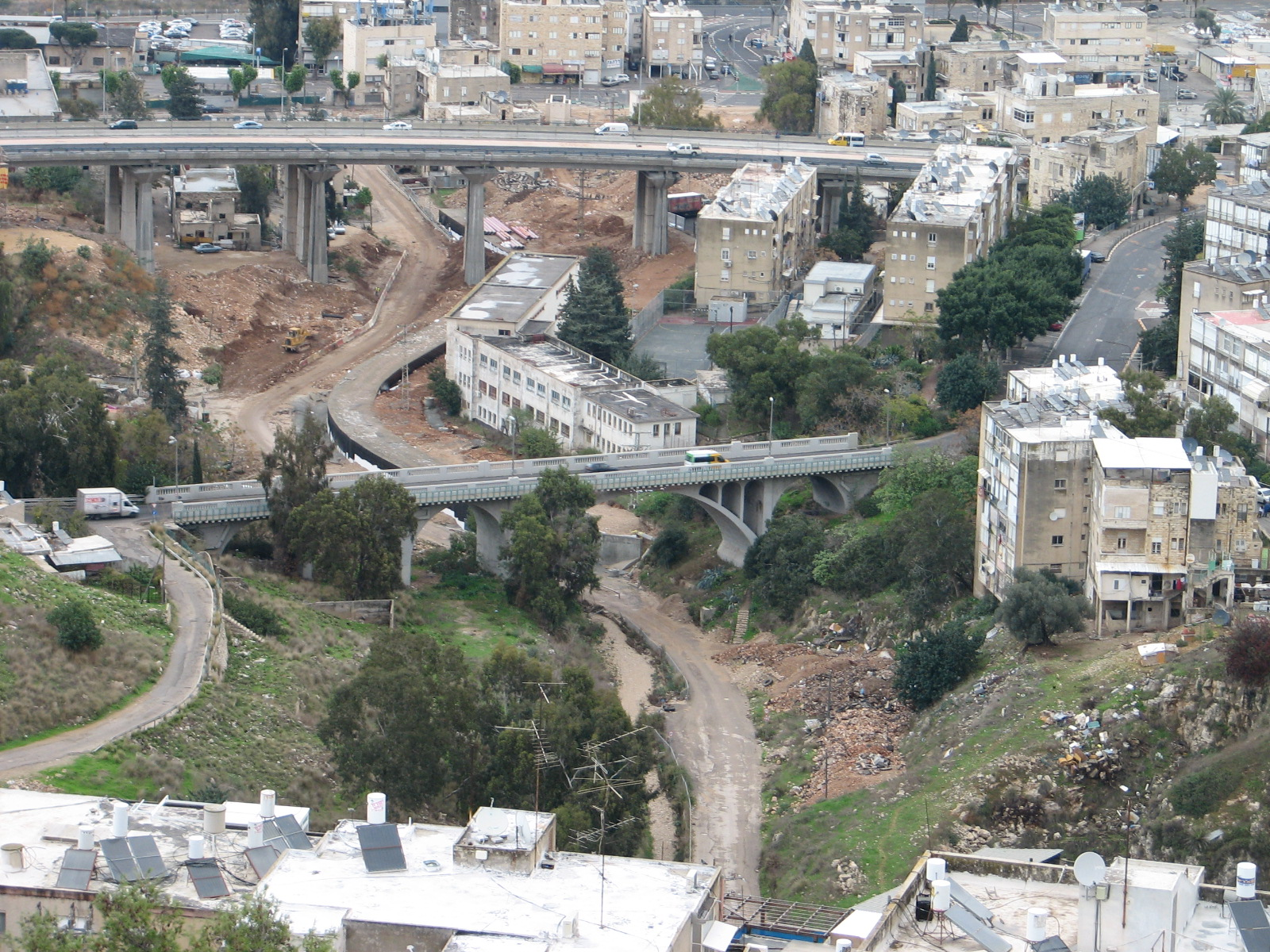
View of Halisa with Nahal Giborim valley and Rushmiya Bridge in the foreground, and Gdud 22 Bridge in the background

Halisa (Hebrew: חליסה; Arabic: الحليصة), also spelled Khalisa, is a neighborhood in the southeastern part of Haifa in northern Israel. It is located in the administrative region of Nave Sha'anan-Izraeliya, on the edge of the Mount Carmel.

== Geography ==
Halisa lies at an altitude of less than 100 meters, about 2 kilometers southeast of the center of the lower town. It is bordered to the south by the Nave Sha'anan district, to the west by Nachala, and to the north by the central part of the city around Kibbutz Galujot Street. Further to the north, industrial areas are already spread around the port of Haifa. It occupies a position on the northern edge of the slopes of Carmel. To the west, this settlement slope is bounded by the valley of wadi Nahal Giborim. The main traffic axis is ha-Giborim Street. The population is Arab, with a Jewish minority.

== History ==
Halisa features the oldest settlement centers in this area. The Rushmiya Bridge, built in 1927 under the mayor Hassan Bey Shukri, leads over the Nahal Giborim wadi. From an engineering point of view, the concrete structure represented one of the most modern buildings of this type in Mandatory Palestine at the time. Its arc had a span of 30 meters. During the first Arab-Israeli war, or the previous period of the civil war in Palestine in 1948, fighting between Jews and Arabs took place here. Later, the even newer Gdud 22 Bridge was built near it.
