= Sugar Street, Hong Kong =

Street in Causeway Bay, Hong Kong

Coordinates: 22.2799°N 114.1866°E

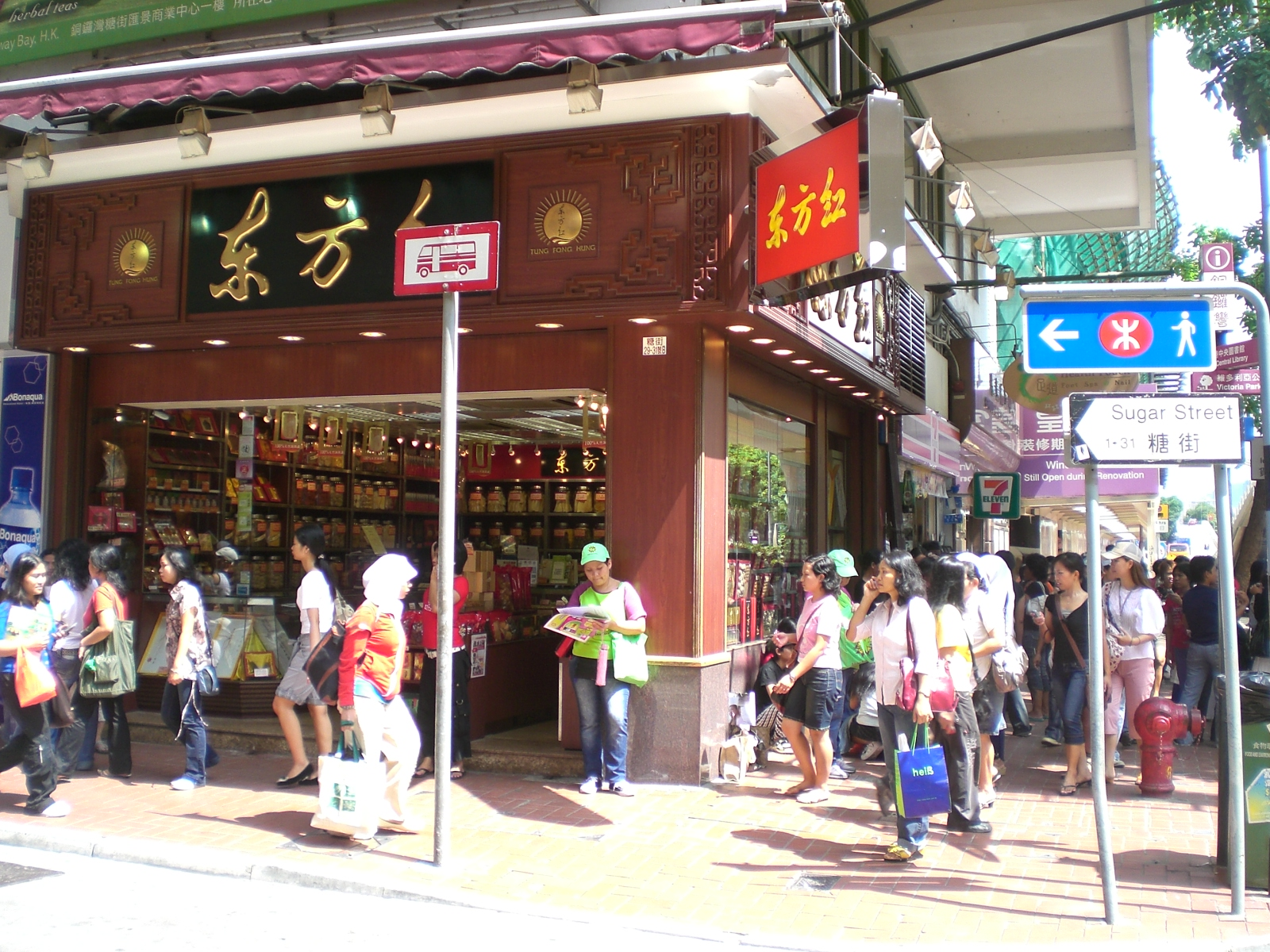
Sugar Street.

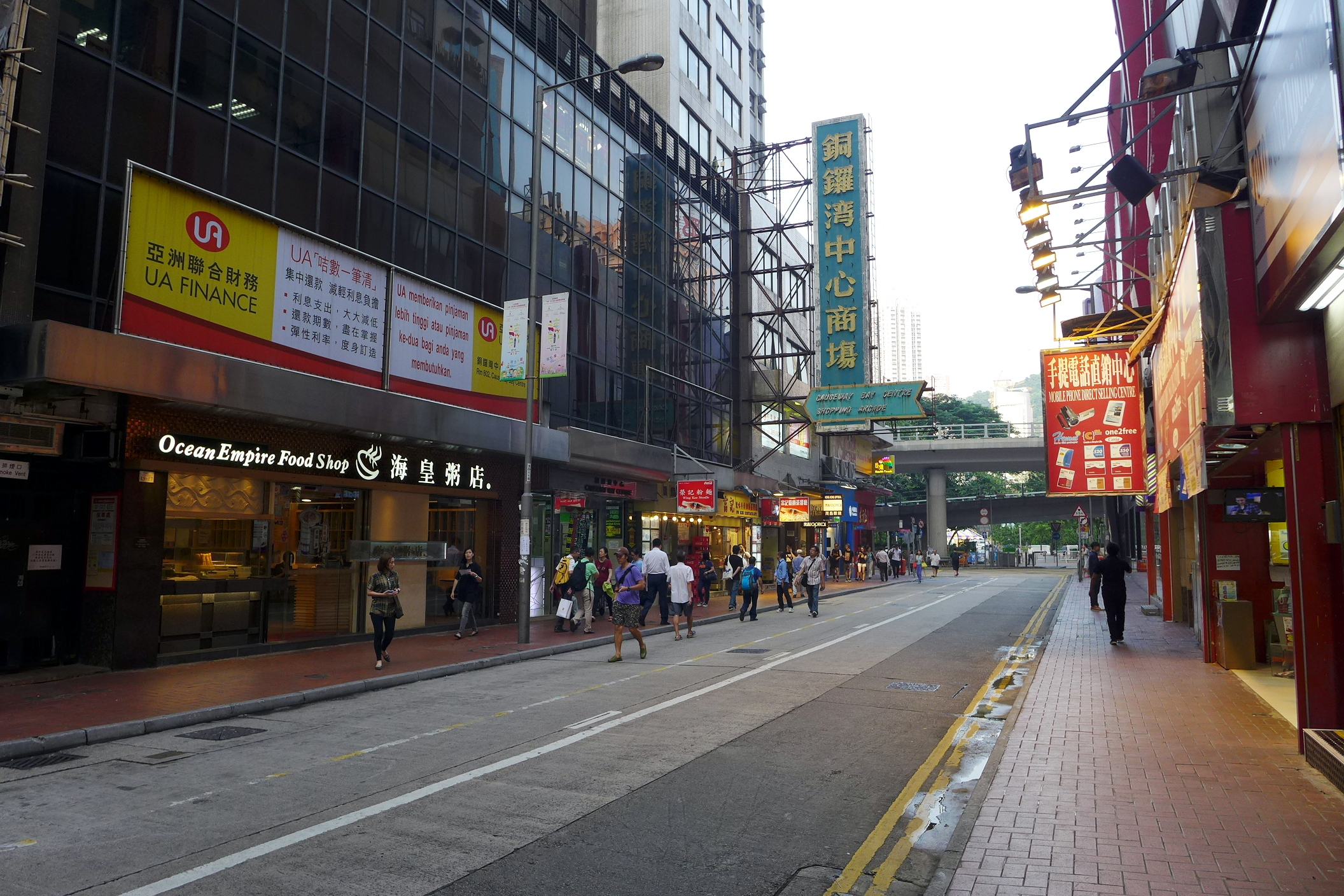
Sugar Street.

Sugar Street (Chinese: 糖街; Jyutping: Tong2 gaai1) is a street in Causeway Bay, Hong Kong.

The street is less than 100 metres long. It runs one-way (west to east) in one lane of traffic.

== Etymology ==
According to local folklore the street received its name after the Hong Kong Mint, based here from 1866 to 1868 failed because although silver was poured into the coin making machinery, "sparkling white sugar grains emerged."

== See also ==
- List of streets and roads in Hong Kong
