= Ein HaYam (Wadi al-Jimal) =

Coordinates: 32°49′35″N 34°57′45″E

Ein HaYam עין הים Wadi al-Jimal
- Neighborhood in Haifa, Israel
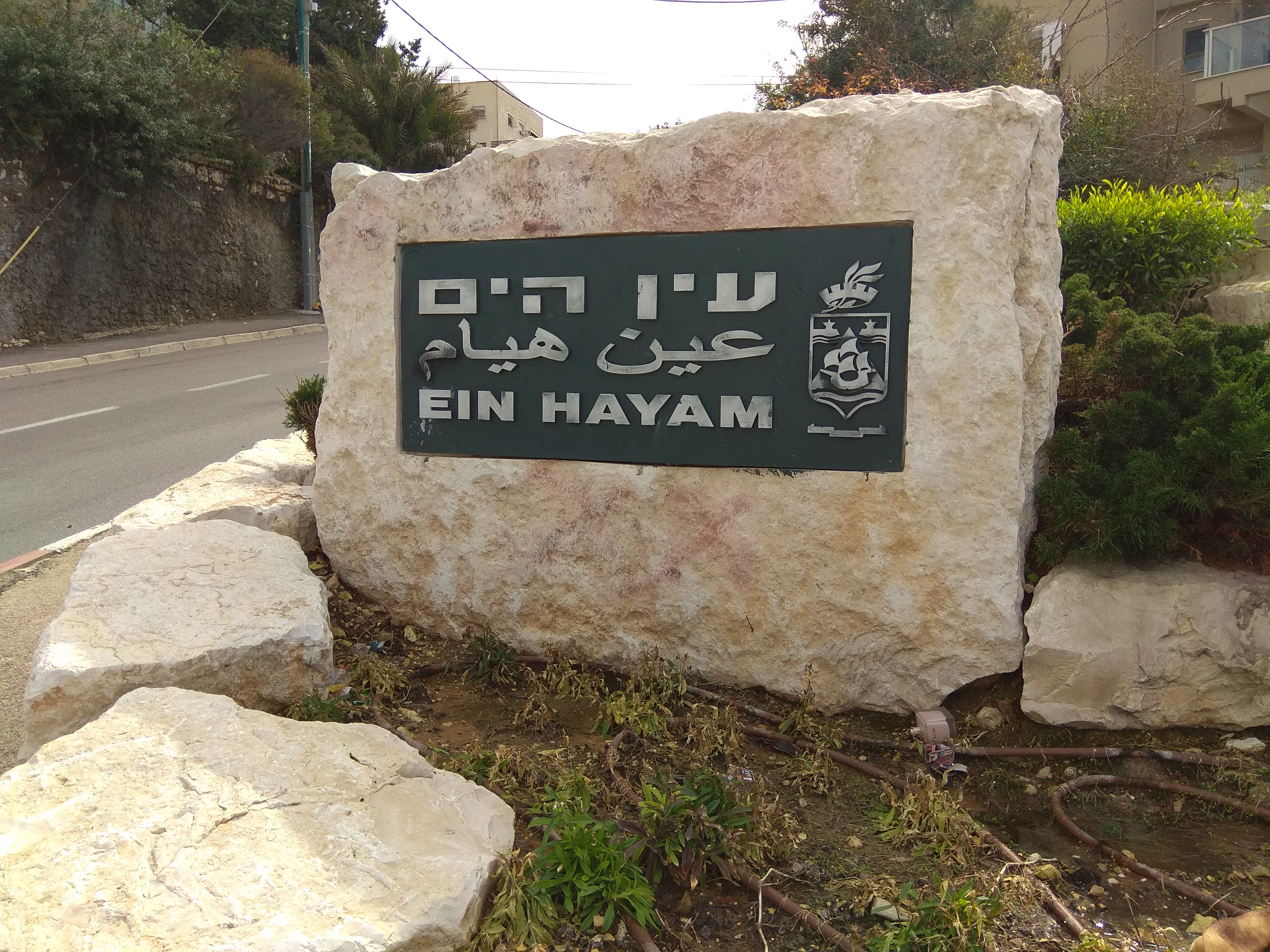
- Interactive map of Ein HaYam

Population
  - Total: 2,400

Ein HaYam (Hebrew: עין הים, lit. 'Eye of the Sea'), formerly Wadi al-Jimal, is a small neighborhood in Haifa, Israel between Kiryat Sprinzak and Kiryat Eliezer, mostly separated from the sea by railroad tracks.

The neighborhood was founded in 1937 by Arab families and was known in Arabic as Wadi al-Jimal. The neighborhood was called "Ein HaYam -- Wadi al-Jimal" until 2006, when the official name and entrance sign were changed to "Ein HaYam (Previously Wadi al-Jimal)." In August 2021, the Haifa Naming Commission recommended restoration of the old name and signage and received pushback from some officials. By 2022, the municipality of Haifa was referring to the neighborhood as "Ein HaYam - Wadi al-Jimal" in official publications and the pre-2006 entrance sign had been restored. After the 2023 Hamas-led attack on Israel, local Israeli activists complained that the entrance sign had been replaced without proper authorization by the municipal authorities.

2,400 Jews and Arabs live in the neighborhood, which has been cited a model of Jewish-Arab coexistence. It is home to the Oceanographic and Limnological Research Institute of Israel (IOLR), Tel Shikmona and the Ein HaYam trail tour.
