= A Trumpet in the Wadi (film) =

- Hebrew: חצוצרה בואדי
- Based on: A Trumpet in the Wadi by Sami Michael
- Release date: 2001
- Country: Israel
- Language: Hebrew

A Trumpet in the Wadi (Hebrew: חצוצרה בואדי, romanized: HaTzotzra BaVadi) is a 2001 Israeli film based on the novel with the same name.

== Reception ==
=== Critical response ===
Ronnie Schieb characterized it in Variety as follows: "A surprisingly joyous interdenominational romp through the Arab Wadi section of Haifa sports a pint-size Russian Jewish Romeo and an Arab spinster Juliet, but is oddball enough to avoid the usual tragic Capulet/Montague brouhaha."

=== Accolades ===
- 2001: Haifa International Film Festival, Best Feature Film
- 2001: Haifa Culture Foundation Award for a screenplay set in Haifa
- 2002: Fort Lauderdale Film Festival, Best Leading Actor - Alexander Senderovich; Best Leading Actress - Khawla Hajj-Dabsi; Best Supporting Actress - Raida Adon
