= Mahfouz =

Mahfouz is a surname. Notable people with the name include:

- Khalid bin Mahfouz (1949–2009), Saudi businessman
- Naguib Mahfouz (1911-2006), Nobel Prize–winning Egyptian novelist
- Naguib Pasha Mahfouz (1882–1974), Egyptian obstetrician and gynecologist
- Sabir Mahfouz Lahmar, Algerian-born naturalised Bosnian citizen detained by the United States in Guantanamo Bay, Cuba from 2002 to 2009

== See also ==
- Mahfuz, a given name
