= William M. Hutchins =

William Maynard Hutchins (born October 11, 1944) is an American academic, author and translator of contemporary Arabic literature. He was formerly a professor in the Department of Philosophy and Religion at Appalachian State University in Boone, North Carolina.

Hutchins graduated from Yale University 1964, where he majored in art history. Subsequently, he moved to the University of Chicago, where in 1967 he obtained a Master of Arts in philosophy and a Ph.D. in 1971 in Near Eastern languages. His doctoral thesis, on the Persian philosopher Fakhr al-Din al-Razi, is entitled "Fakhr al-Din al-Razi on Knowledge". After stints at Encyclopædia Britannica, Northern Illinois University in DeKalb, Illinois, the University of Ghana, and Harvard University, Hutchins in 1978 joined the faculty of Appalachian State. He was promoted to full professor in 1986.

As a translator, Hutchins's best-known work is his translation of the Cairo Trilogy by Egyptian Nobel Prize-winner Naguib Mahfouz. This trio of novels is widely regarded as one of the finest works of fiction in Arabic literature, and Hutchins' translation is the principal version available in English (published by Everyman's Library among others). In addition, he has translated a variety of Arabic authors: Tawfiq al-Hakim, Ibrahim 'Abd al-Qadir al-Mazini, Muhammad Salmawy, al-Jahiz, Nawal El-Saadawi, Muhammad Khudayyir, Ibrahim al-Koni, Fadhil Al-Azzawi, Hassan Nasr, and others.

In 2005–2006, Hutchins received a US National Endowment for the Arts grant in literary translation. His translations have appeared in several issues of Banipal magazine. He has also written a number of original short stories that have been published in the journals Cold Mountain Review and Crucible.

== Awards and honors ==
- 2013 Banipal Prize for Arabic Literary Translation for the translation of A Land Without Jasmine by Wajdi al-Ahdal

== See also ==
- List of Arabic-to-English translators
