= List of Lebanese women writers =

This is a list of women writers who were born in Lebanon or whose writings are closely associated with that country.

== A ==
- Etel Adnan (1925–2021), Lebanese-American poet, essayist, artist, writing in English, French and Arabic
- Ezza Agha Malak (born 1942), acclaimed French-language novelist, poet
- Suzanne Alaywan (born 1974), poet, artist

== B ==
- Sahar Baassiri, since 1981: journalist, non-fiction writer
- Layla Balabakki (1936–2023), novelist, journalist, feminist
- Hoda Barakat (born 1952), widely translated Arabic-language novelist, author of The Stone of Laughter
- Najwa Barakat (born 1966), novelist

== C ==
- Tracy Chamoun (born 1962), politician, non-fiction writer, memoirist
- Youmna Chlala, writer, artist
- Amal Clooney (born 1978), Lebanese-born British lawyer, non-fiction writer

== D ==
- Raghida Dergham (born 1953), Lebanese-American journalist

== F ==
- Emily Fares Ibrahim (1914–2011), Lebanese-American writer, poet and feminist
- Zaynab Fawwaz (1860–1914), poet, novelist, journalist, biographer

== H ==
- Joumana Haddad (born 1970), widely translated Arabic-language poet, translator, journalist, women's rights activist
- Nimat Hamoush, novelist, short story writer
- Renée Hayek, contemporary novelist, short story writer

== J ==
- Inaya Jaber (1958–2021), poet, short story writer, journalist, artist and singer
- Nada Awar Jarrar, since 2003: novelist, author of Somewhere, home

== K ==
- Anbara Salam Khalidy (1897–1986), feminist, memoirist, translator
- Tara Khattar (born 1993), chef and food writer
- Vénus Khoury-Ghata (1937–2026), novelist, poet

== M ==
- Rima Maktabi (born 1977), journalist, television reporter
- Jacqueline Massabki (died 2015), novelist and lawyer
- Diane Mazloum (born 1980), French-Lebanese writer
- Fatin al-Murr (born 1969), Arabic-language short story writer, novelist

== N ==
- Layal Najib (c.1983–2006), photojournalist, killed during the 2006 Lebanon War
- Octavia Nasr (born 1966), journalist, CNN reporter
- Emily Nasrallah (1931–2018), novelist, journalist, short story writer, women's rights activist

== Q ==
- Najwa Qassem (1967–2020), contemporary journalist, television reporter since 1993

== R ==
- Salima Abi Rashed (1887–1919), journalist

== S ==
- Dalal Khalil Safadi (1898–1876), short story writer, translator
- Nadia Sahari (born 1968), Lebanese-American writer, actress and businesswoman
- Widad Sakakini (1913–1991), short story writer, novelist, critic
- Afifa Al Shartouni (1886–1906) writer, poet
- Hanan al-Shaykh (born 1945), journalist, novelist, author of Women of Sand and Myrrh
- Alawiya Sobh (born 1955), novelist, magazine editor
- Nazik Saba Yared (born 1928), novelist, academic
- Nur Salman (born 1937), writer

== T ==
- Sahar Taha (born 1963), musician, singer, journalist
- Nadia Tueni (1935–1983), French-language poet

== U ==
- Layla ʽUssayran (1934–2007), novelist

== Z ==
- Maya Zankoul (born 1986), artist, cartoonist, best selling novelist
- May Ziadeh (1886–1941), prolific poet, essayist, columnist, translator

== See also ==
- List of women writers
