= Confessional writing =

Literary style

Confessional writing is a literary style and genre that developed in American writing schools following the Second World War. A prominent mode of confessional writing is confessional poetry, which emerged in the 1950s and 1960s. Confessional writing is often historically associated with Postmodernism due to the features which the modes share: including self-performativity and self-reflexivity; discussions of culturally taboo subjects; and the literary influences of personal conflict and historical trauma. Confessional writing also has historical origins in Catholic confessional practices. As such, confessional writing is congruent with psychoanalytic literary criticism. Confessional writing is also a form of life writing, especially through the autobiography form.

Confessional writing usually involves the disclosure of personal revelations and secrets, often in first-person, non-fiction forms such as diaries and memoirs. Confessional writing often employs colloquial speech and direct language to invoke an immediacy between reader and author. Confessional writers also use this direct language to radically reduce the distance between the speaker-persona of a text and the writer's personal voice. Confessional writing can also be fictive, such as in the hybrid form of the roman à clef.

Though originating in American literary circles, by writers and poets such as Adrienne Rich, Robert Lowell, Sylvia Plath, and Anne Sexton, the style has gained global use concurrently with the growth of Postcolonial theory at the end of the 20th century, especially throughout Eurasia and the Middle East. Confessional writing has also influenced other mediums, including the visual arts and reality television.

A highly influential movement, confessional writing has been critiqued as narcissistic, self-indulgent, as well as a violation of the privacy of the private individuals which confessional writers depict.

== Development of the confessional writing genre ==
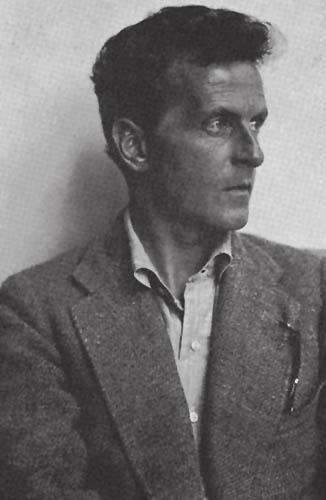
A photograph of Ludwig Wittgenstein, taken in 1930. Wittgenstein theorised on the psychological implications and mechanisms of confession as a cathartic act.

The confessional writing genre has historical roots in Catholic confessional practices. Works such as St. Augustine's Confessions and Jean-Jacques Rousseau's Confessions are historic antecedents to the modern confessional genre in their depictions of secret emotions, personal revelations, and of sin.

In the early 20th century, the growth of psychoanalysis increased academic interest in the psychological functions of confession itself. Following their expatriation from wartime continental Europe to the United Kingdom and United States during the Second World War, eminent psychoanalytical theorists including Sigmund Freud, Heinz Hartmann, Ernst Kris, Rudolph Loewenstein, and Ludwig Wittgenstein began to theorise on the defence functions of ego in times of conflict. Wittgenstein expounded on confession as a 'means of self-development,' in that the catharsis facilitated by the act of confession allowed for closure, and the progression away from both unconscious and conscious suffering: writing in 1931 that 'a confession must be part of your new life.'

The literary 'confessional' term was first attributed to a form of writing in 1959: by critic M.L. Rosenthal in response to the confessional poet Robert Lowell's seminal anthology Life Studies. The anthology is widely regarded as a seminal confessional text, in the poet's revelations on his relationship to his parents, marital conflict, depression, and generational trauma. Many confessional writers at the time were associated with or worked in American writing schools at institutions such as Boston University. Though the style has since gained global use (See: Global influence), confessional writing emerged in America during the turbulent late 1950s and early 1960s, and was initially characterised by movements away from strictly metred verse to free verse. Following the Second World War, the Holocaust, and during other collective traumas such as the Cold War, American 'cultural alienation' induced writers to externalise their internal, psychological anxieties and angsts through their literary outputs.

The period was also marked by the secession of Modernism to Postmodernism, the Civil rights movement, the Gay Rights Movement, and the onset of Second Wave Feminism and Postcolonialism. As such, early confessional works, by writers such as Adrienne Rich, Sylvia Plath, Dan Guenther, and Robert Lowell encompass personal and social issues including distrust of metanarratives, solipsism, taboos, and the transgression of restrictive social roles.

Contemporary confessional works encompass broader social issues, including drug-use, digital identity, popular culture, and political engagement.

== Key features and notable works ==
Confessional writing is often non-fictive and delivered in direct, first-person narration. Confessional writing usually involves the divulging and discussion of 'shameful matters', including personal secrets and controversial perspectives in forms such as autobiography, diary, memoir, and also epistolary narratives. Confessional writing often involves emotions such as shame, fear of ostracism, social discomfort, and disorder; as well as empowerment, self-expression, and liberation.

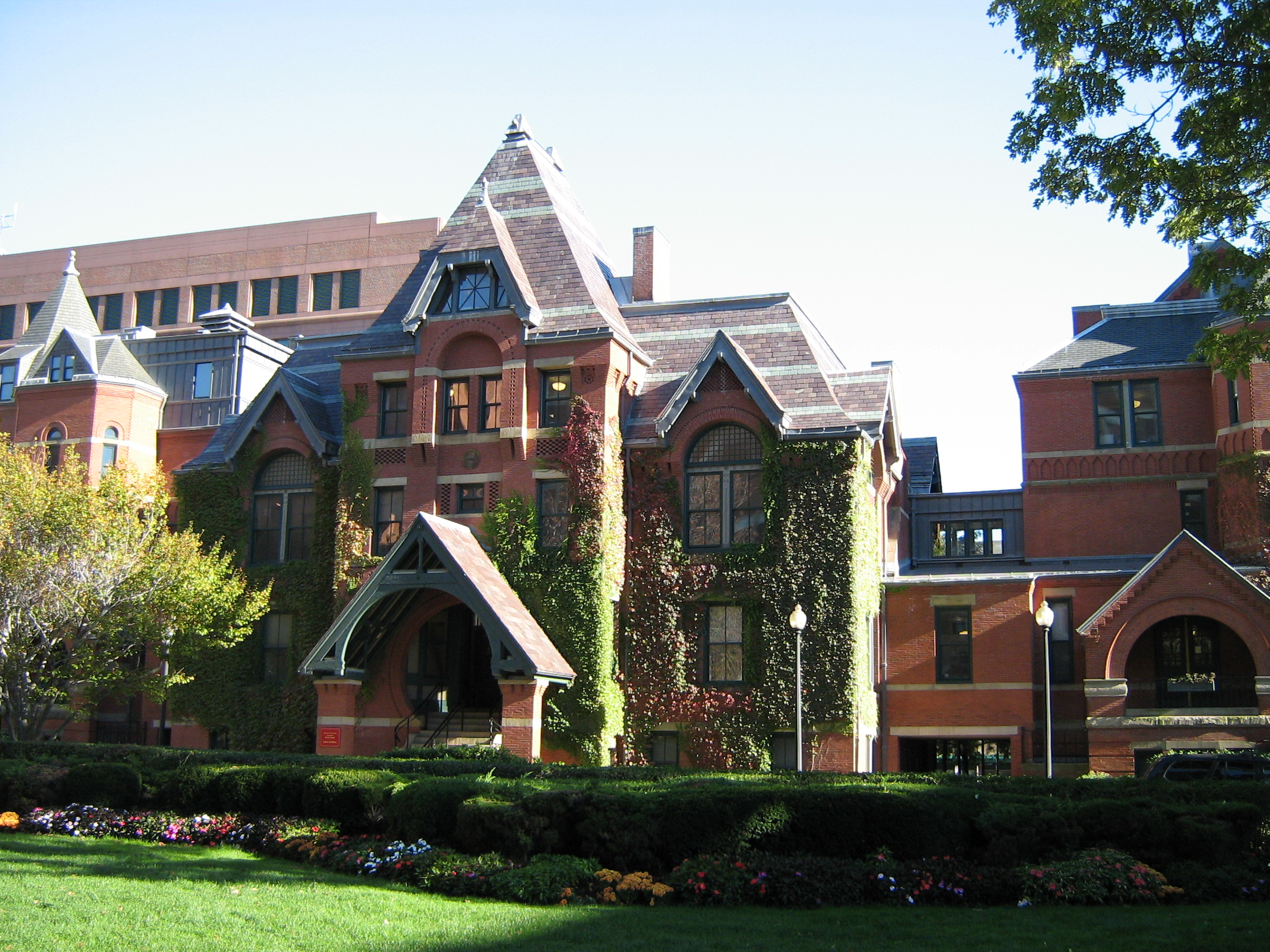
A building of the Boston University campus, a prominent institution during the early development of confessional writing.

Owing to the religious connotations of confession, confessional writing is often invocative of religious imagery as reflective of sin and desire. The potential aims of confessional writing include the achievement of closure, catharsis, and the representation of socially marginalised perspectives. Confessional Writing thus also may serve as a literary 'therapeutic outlet.'

Robert Lowell's Life Studies, an autobiographical suite of poems detailing Lowell's upbringing and personal family life, is often regarded as the seminal confessional work. Other important works of confessional writing include Sylvia Plath's The Bell Jar, a roman à clef of Plath's descent into depression and suicide attempts while interning for Mademoiselle magazine. The novel blends elements of fiction and non-fiction within the parameters of the confessional genre, by representing real people and events through a fictive façade: Mademoiselle magazine is replaced with the fictional Ladies' Day magazine, and Plath's own experience is surrogated by the protagonist, Esther Greenwood's perspective. Plath also initially published the novel under the pseudonym, 'Victoria Lucas.'

More recent works of confessional writing include Codeine Diary, by Tom Andrews, a personal account of living with the disease haemophilia; Girlhood, by Melissa Febos, an account of the development of the female body from adolescence into adulthood, and of the narrativity of the socially-constructed experience of femininity; Trick Mirror: Reflections on Self-Delusion by Jia Tolentino¸ a confessional blend of personal essay and social criticism concerning the rise of the internet during the 1990s and early 2000s, as well as the fallacious digital identities which social media is productive of; Before I Say Goodbye by Ruth Picardie, a memoir of her terminal illness with breast cancer; Bridget Jone's Diary by Helen Fielding, a novel of the love life and entering of middle-age by the titular protagonist through the diary perspective; and White City Blue by Tim Lott, a fictive account of the limits and stigmas of male friendship and in adulthood.

== Global influences and iterations ==
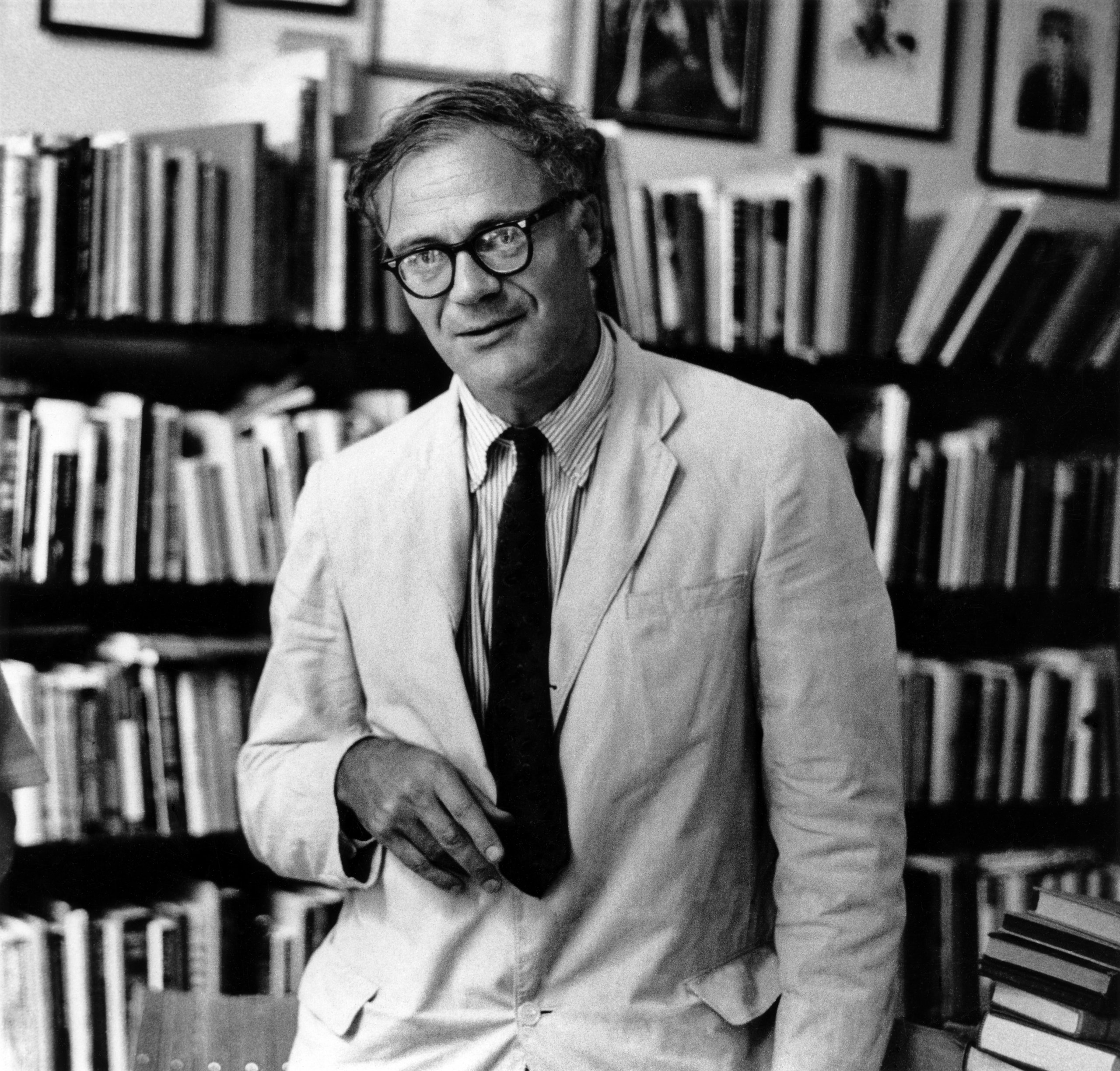
A photograph of Robert Lowell, a prominent and seminal confessional writer.

Though originating in American literary circles, the confessional writing style has gained global use with the growth of Postcolonial theory and globalisation at the end of the 20th century, especially throughout Eurasia and the Middle East, with focuses on personal intersectionality. Key ideas which global confessional writing explores include globalisation, cultural conflict, and the diasporic experience.

The Cry of Winnie Mandela, a novel by Njabulo Ndebele, incorporates stylistic features of the confessional writing genre, including first-person narration and the divulging of personal histories, to critique the Apartheid regime, and to represent the experiences of 'repression suffered by civilians and concealed by colonial occupying forces.

Sticky Rice Homoeroticism and Queer Politics by Shinsuke Eguchi blends academic and confessional writing to autoethnographically critique and decolonise perceptions of homosexuality and internalised racism, combining academic elements of theory and criticism with literary and memoir-like representations of personal experience.

Souvankham Thammavongsa's poetic anthology Small Arguments uses features of confessional writing in a 'subtle probing of the world' to depict the refugee experience in Canada and concerns of self-determination.

A Mountainous Journey by Fadwa Tuqan investigates the struggles of the Palestinian people, through a confessional, intimate perspective, to challenge the patriarchal and colonial hegemonies which problematise the endurance of her people, and the place of women in Islamic society.

Beirut Blues by Hanan al-Shaykh explores war-torn Beirut during the Lebanese Civil War, from the perspective of the young female narrator in confessional modes, including epistolary narratives.

== Influences on other media ==
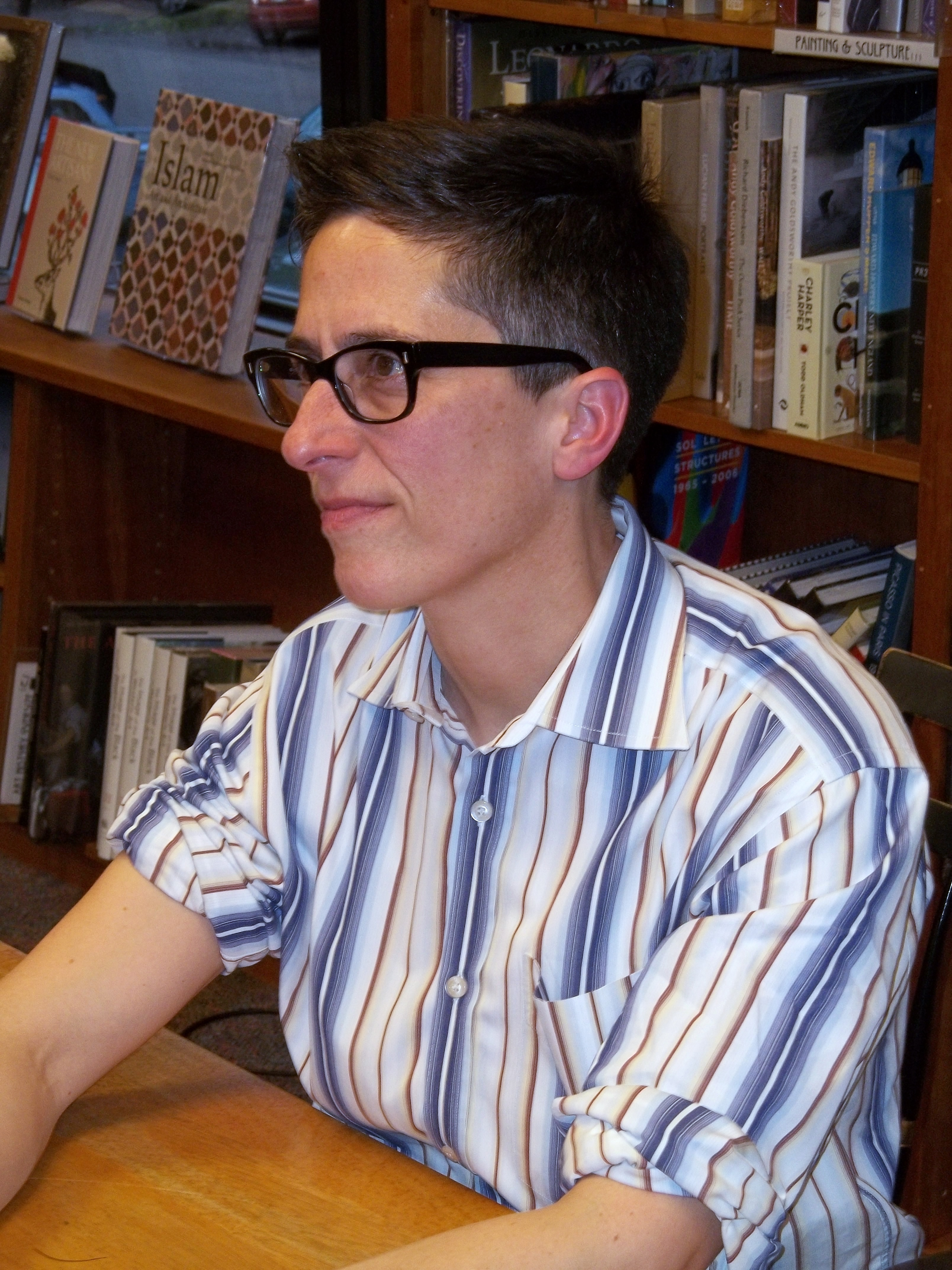
Cartoonist and writer Alison Bechdel, who merged confessional writing conventions with the graphic novel form.

Confessional writing features and styles have translated into and influenced other non-literary forms: especially in contemporary art through the use of prominent confessional features such as the divulsion of personal secrets and the presentation of intimate and sometimes scandalous details of the artist's private lives.

My Bed is a confessional artwork by Tracey Emin: depicting a dishevelled bed stained with bodily secretions and surrounded by personal effects including empty vodka bottles, condoms, and menstrual-blood-stained undergarments. The artwork caused public outcry and controversy: employing features of the confessional style — including the presentation of intimate personal effects and socially taboo objects —in challenging the acceptable limits of personal and artistic representation.

French artist Louise Bourgeois also explored elements of confessional writing throughout her body of work, especially through representing her relationships with family members. Bourgeois' 1974 tableau The Destruction of the Father psychologically explored the artist's relationship to her father through biomorphic and phallic objects, presented in a crime-scene scenario – the implication being that the child has cannibalised their overbearing father. The spider motif throughout Bourgeois' art, including in the Maman sculpture series, alludes to Bourgeois' relationship to her mother, and the nourishment and protection it was productive of.

Candy Cheng's art installation Confessions, which has been exhibited across America, Central and Eastern Europe, invited viewers and members of the public to write anonymous confessions onto a wooden board and hang their confession on the work itself, with emphasis on features typical to the confessional writing genre including the catharsis of the act of confession, and the desire to reveal secrets.

Fun Home and Are You My Mother? are both memoirs by American cartoonist Alison Bechdel, which incorporate features of confessional writing through the graphic novel medium.

Academics have also expounded on the self-performativity and confession-based format of reality television shows such as Big Brother as having roots in the confessional writing genre. Critics have likewise highlighted the ubiquity of confessional 'self-disclosure' in the public domains of social media and the internet, and how twenty-first century technologies are supplanting the traditional distinctions between an individual's public life and private self.

== Criticisms of the confessional writing genre ==
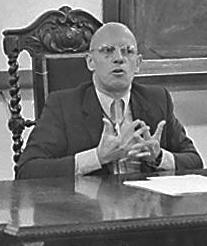
Michel Foucault in 1974. Foucault theorised on confession as an oppressive, hegemonic condition

A highly influential movement, confessional writing has been critiqued as narcissistic, self-indulgent, as well as a violation of the privacy of the private individuals which confessional writers depict. Owing to the exclusively heterosexual and upper-class White Anglo-Saxon Protestantism which characterises many of the early confessional writers, such as Robert Lowell and Sylvia Plath, the mode has been critiqued as solipsistic, 'classist, self assured, and elusive,' as well as lacking diverse social and cultural perspectives.

Further, theorist Michel Foucault explicated that confession, as an act inherent to the social structures of law, medicine, and faith, is a consolidated act of social oppression: confining subjects within traditional hegemonies of shame, guilt, and socially-constructed requirements of forgiveness.

Feminist discourse is separated on the mode: whilst some theorists regard the depiction of issues such as sexual violence, eating disorders, and mental illness by female confessional writers as liberating, others view it as voyeuristic and objectifying.

The New Formalism school of writing, a movement of the late 20th century which emphasised returns to formulaic and strictly metrical poetry, was formed in direct response to the dominance of confessional styles of poetry which were characterised by unfixed structures and free verse, forms denigrated by the school as lacking finesse and craft.

== See also ==
- Confessional poetry
- Life writing
- Robert Lowell
- Postmodernism
