= Justine Picardie =

British novelist, fashion writer and biographer

- Born: 1961
- Occupations: Author, editor
- Children: 2 (including Jamie MacColl)
- Relatives: Ruth Picardie (sister)

Justine Picardie (born 1961) is a British novelist, fashion writer and biographer.

== Career ==
Picardie is a former editor-in-chief of Harper's Bazaar UK and Town & Country UK. Her 2010 biography of Coco Chanel, Coco Chanel: The Legend and the Life, was shortlisted for the Galaxy National Book Awards. A long-time question among fashion historians and experts about whether the famous pink Chanel suit of Jacqueline Bouvier Kennedy was made by Chanel in France or a quality copy purchased from New York's semiannual Chez Ninon collections was resolved by Picardie, who showed (as written in Picardie’s 2010 book Coco Chanel: The Legend and the Life) that the suit was a garment made by Chez Ninon using Chanel's approved "line for line" system with authorized Chanel patterns and materials.

== Personal life ==
Picardie's sister was writer Ruth Picardie.

Picardie’s elder son is Jamie MacColl, the guitarist for Bombay Bicycle Club.

== Works ==
- Picardie, Justine (2002). If the Spirit Moves You: Life and Love After Death. New York: Riverhead Books. ISBN 9781573222112. OCLC 48391268.
- —— (2004). Truth or Dare: A Book of Secrets Shared. London, U.K.: Picador. ISBN 9780330432016. OCLC 56652111.
- —— (2004). Wish I May. London, U.K.: Picador. ISBN 9780330412216. OCLC 53391992.
- —— (2006). My Mother's Wedding Dress: The Life and Afterlife of Clothes. New York: Bloomsbury Publishing. ISBN 9781596911499. OCLC 62393015.
- —— (2008). Daphne: A Novel. London, U.K.: Bloomsbury. ISBN 9781596913417. OCLC 217263983.
- —— (2010). Coco Chanel: The Legend and the Life. New York: HarperCollins. ISBN 9780061963858. OCLC 664270219.
- —— (2021). Miss Dior: A Story of Courage and Couture. New York: Farrar, Straus and Giroux. ISBN 978-0374210359. OCLC 1277506193.
