= Jacqueline Kennedy: The White House Years =

2001 exhibition

Jacqueline Kennedy: The White House Years was a 2001 exhibition that was presented by the Costume Institute at the Metropolitan Museum of Art. The event was timed to mark the 40th anniversary of her "emergence as America’s first lady." Organized by The Metropolitan Museum of Art and the John F. Kennedy Library and Museum, the exhibition was devoted to exploring the former First Lady's iconic style and impact on the fashion world.

The exhibition included 80 original costumes and accessories that belonged to Jacqueline Kennedy Onassis that were donated to the JFK Library after she left the White House.

The exhibition ran from May 1, 2001 to July 29, 2001 at The Met and was later displayed at the John F. Kennedy Presidential Library and Museum from September 15, 2001 to February 28, 2002 with additional photographs, film, and objects that were associated with Jacqueline Kennedy.

== Background ==
"Jacqueline Kennedy is one of history's great style icons," Hamish Bowles, the executive European editor-at-large of Vogue, and a creative consultant for the exhibition said in 2000 when the show was announced. "Her profound influence on the way an entire generation wanted to look, dress, and behave cannot be overestimated."

Among the 80 costumes that made up the exhibition, there were many outfits designed by fashion superstars like Chanel, Oleg Cassini, Dior, Hubert de Givenchy, Bergdorf Goodman, Halston, and Gustave Tassell.

In a 2001 piece in the New York Times, Caroline Kennedy is quoted saying her mother "will always grace the history she helped to make." In a speech at the exhibition's opening reception, Caroline Kennedy also stressed her mother's work in transforming the White House into a place where American culture and art were centered. The costumes displayed were all worn by Jacqueline Kennedy during state events and were presented alongside historical documented and artifacts related to the former first lady's work on White House preservation, her support of the arts and her work as a traveling ambassador for the United States.

The former first lady's work to redecorate the White House was integral to making 1600 Pennsylvania Avenue a place that embraced American art and culture. The exhibition featured clothing worn by Jacqueline Kennedy on the campaign trail, from the White House itself, and on state visits around the world.

Bowles also reflected on how Jacqueline Kennedy's style reflected a changing America during the exhibition's opening gala, "It's that exciting synthesis of complete 1950s propriety and conformity with 1960s modernity — it was a fashion cusp," he said. "By the early '60s, Jackie had very much discovered her fashion identity." During the Kennedy administration, Jacqueline Bouvier Kennedy played a significant role in repairing the White House, supporting the arts, encouraging historic preservation, and serving as a visiting ambassador.

== Notable Pieces ==
Among the costumes included in the exhibition were several memorable outfits worn by Jacqueline Kennedy. Several journalists covering the exhibition noted that visitors may have been surprised at the amount of color in the former first lady's wardrobe, given that she was photographed with black and white film most of the time. "She often used elements of her destination to inspire her wardrobe," noted the Washington Post's Robin Givhan.

"For those of us who grew up in that era watching black and white television, you're just blown away walking into the exhibit, seeing the incredibly brilliant colors in her clothing," said Ted McNaught of the Kennedy Library and Museum.in 2002.

Historic outfits/ objects that were part of the exhibition included:

- The fawn coat and pillbox hat worn by Mrs. Kennedy to the January 20, 1961 inauguration by Oleg Cassini
- The red dress worn during the televised tour of the White House in 1962 by Chez Ninon
- The imperial dress and opera coat worn to Charles de Gaulle's state dinner at Versailles in 1961.
- A pink Givenchy gown worn at a state dinner in 1963
- The regal Ivory satin gown worn to the pre-Inaugural Gala
- A large group of formal evening clothes worn at the White House for state dinners, political entertaining, and cultural events.
- Documents and objects associated with Mrs. Kennedy's work on White House restoration, historic preservation

== Tour ==
In addition to being displayed at the Metropolitan Museum of Art and the John F. Kennedy Presidential Library and Museum, the exhibition was also displayed in Washington D.C., Paris and Chicago.
