= Catherine Cobham =

British Arabist

Catherine Cobham is a scholar and translator of Arabic literature.

She obtained a BA from Leeds University and an MA from Manchester University and taught at the University of St Andrews for many years. She continues to translate poetry and fiction from Arabic to English.

She has translated numerous literary works from Arabic to English, including several by the Lebanese author Hanan al-Shaykh.

- Adunis – An Introduction to Arab Poetics
- Fuad al–Takarli – The Long Way Back
- Hanan al-Shaykh – Beirut Blues
- Hanan al-Shaykh – I Sweep the Sun Off Rooftops
- Hanan al-Shaykh – Only in London
- Hanan al-Shaykh – Women of Sand and Myrrh
- Hasan Abdallah al-Qurashi – Spectres of Exile and Other Poems (co-translator: John Heath–Stubbs)
- Mahmoud Darwish – A River Dies of Thirst
- Naguib Mahfouz – The Harafish
- Nawal El Saadawi – Memoirs of a Woman Doctor
- Yusuf Idris – Rings of Burnished Brass
- A Reader of Modern Arabic Short Stories (co-editor with Sabry Hafez)
- Jasmine, Lady of the Arabs (editor; Safaya Salter, illustrator)
- The Iraqi Novel: Key Writers, Key Texts, Edinburgh Studies in Modern Arabic Literature, 2013 (with Fabio Caiani), Edinburgh University Press, 264 pages – "Followers of Arabic literature have long been awaiting the critical acclaim recently afforded to Iraqi fiction. ... This interest makes ... The Iraqi Novel a particular timely contribution that will provide English-language readers further exposure to Iraqi literature."

== See also ==
- List of Arabic-English translators
