= Wadida Wassef =

Egyptian writer and translator

Wadida Wassef (Arabic: وديدة واصف; born 1926) is an Egyptian writer and translator.

== Biography ==
Wadida Wassef was born in 1926 in Alexandria, Egypt. Her family was upper-class and Coptic, though she also studied the Quran to learn about her nation's majority religion, at her father's encouragement. She grew up speaking Arabic, French, and Italian at home, as well as English at school, and she studied both English and Arabic literature. Her family then sent her to study at the American Mission College for Girls in Cairo.

After graduation, she worked at her alma mater's Faculty of Arts Department of English, then taught European history as well as English language and literature at El Nasr Girls' College.

When marriage cut short her career as an educator, Wassef began picking up work as a translator. For the American Research Center in Egypt, she worked on collections of Egyptian short fiction, drama, and philosophy. In 1978, she translated into English the Yusuf Idris short story collection The Cheapest Nights, which has been published on multiple occasions, including as part of the Heinemann African Writers Series and Penguin Classics.

In the 1970s, she began writing her own work while feeling isolated in the small city of Shibin El Kom, where she had relocated for her husband's career. She published her short stories and autobiographical essays, often originally written in English, in magazines and anthologies, such as 2004's Opening the Gates: An Anthology of Arab Feminist Writing and 2009's Women Writing Africa: The Northern Region.
