= Llanishen High School =

- Ysgol Uwchradd Llanisien
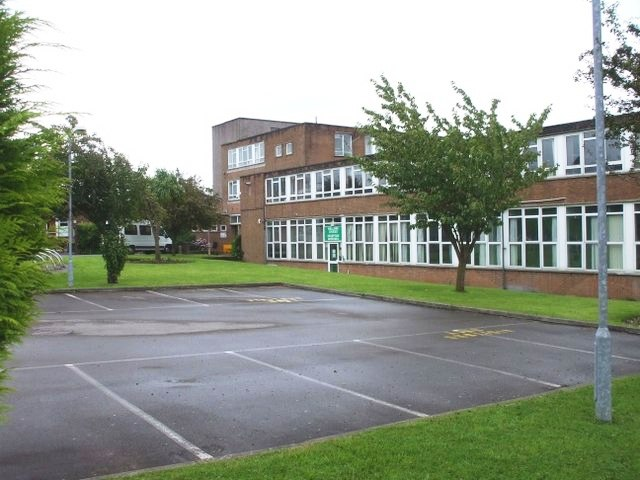
- Llanishen High School

Location
- Heol Hir; Llanishen, Cardiff, CF14 5YL; Wales; 51°31′55″N 3°11′17″W

Information
- Type: Publicly Funded High School
- Motto: We believe that all can succeed (Welsh: Credwn y gall pob llwyddo)
- Religious affiliation: None
- Established: 1969
- Local authority: Cardiff
- Headteacher: Sarah Parry
- Staff: 210 (approx)
- Gender: Coeducational
- Age: 11 to 18
- Enrolment: 1,720 (approx) (2022)
- Language: English
- Colours: Black and Blue
- Website: http://www.llanishenhighschool.co.uk/

Llanishen High School (Welsh: Ysgol Uwchradd Llanisien) is an English-medium secondary school based in Llanishen, Cardiff, Wales. It has approximately 1700 students, making it the largest single-site secondary school in Cardiff. It also has a sixth form college for 16–18 year olds.

== History ==
The school was originally founded as Heol Hir County Secondary School in 1957. Initially, it operated as two separate institutions: a boys' school and a girls' school. This model continued until it was officially reorganised and renamed Llanishen High School in 1969. The school's official opening by the Lord Mayor took place on Valentine's Day, 1958. The school's early years and its transition from a secondary modern school to a comprehensive high school are documented in local records and school archives.

In 2016, Llanishen High School was rated "adequate" by Estyn and put into monitoring. It was removed from monitoring later the same year, and has made significant progress since then. Part of this has been attributed to a newer, smarter uniform policy. This uniform policy was heavily disputed at first, with a petition of over 200 signing a petition opposing the changes due to cost and practicality.

In 2019, the school notably got its own therapy dog, Daisy, a Cavalier King Charles Spaniel. She is meant to help with student stress and anxiety, and also to improve behaviour. This followed a similar move by Bishop of Llandaff Church in Wales High School. This inspired other schools in Cardiff to provide similar student support.

As of 2025, The school has another therapy dog named Koda. He is a Golden Retriever, and like Daisy he helps students with anxiety and school stress to feel better about coming into school.

== School buildings ==
Much of the school was built during the 1950s, but some buildings (the new Science block for example) were built in later decades. The School has a hockey pitch, basketball court, indoor tennis courts, fields for athletics/cricket/football and rugby and enters teams in a variety of competitions - usually competing against local schools. A new D.T. block has been built. The LRC (Learning Resource Centre/Library) and Sports Hall have been renovated.

In Autumn 2018, work on a new 3G pitch was completed on the site of the grass banks. New changing rooms and a clubhouse for Llanishen RFC have also been erected, in place of the indoor tennis facility, as part of an ongoing partnership between the school and the local rugby club.

== Media ==
LHTV was a small TV Station based at the school. The station was involved in an award won at the European Languages Awards 2007 when the Modern Foreign Languages Department won the award for the best "Foreign Language Film".

In 2022, the school television station One Llanishen was launched. Its inaugural production was the Transition Video 2022, and it later went on to produce news, sport, and drama programming such as News Llanishen and Weekly. In September 2025, the station was rebranded to CORE.

As of 2025, the schools radio station has been renovated and upgraded its equipment. After it previously had been damaged by a leak in the ceiling in 2022. Students can now apply to have their own shows with about 6 episodes each per term.

== Sport ==
The school has teams participating in local, regional and national competitions in a variety of sports. The school enjoys particular success in rugby, with the First XV Boys rugby team winning the Welsh Cup in 2014, 2015 and 2016, as well as reaching the final in 2011.

The schools year 7 football boys also won the WSFA under 12 cup in 2022.

== Notable former pupils ==
- Elinor Barker, racing cyclist who currently rides on the track for Great Britain and the Welsh Cycling backed Team USN, and on the road for Matrix Fitness Pro Cycling.
- Tom Cullen, actor and writer whose roles include Jonas in Black Mirror, drug trafficker Yoram in Banged Up Abroad, and Anthony Foyle (the Viscount Gillingham) on Downton Abbey.
- Luke Rowe, racing cyclist who currently rides for Netcompany–Ineos.
- Joe Jacobson, professional footballer for Wycombe Wanderers, as well as former captain of the Wales U21 team and the Cardiff City reserve team.
- John Tabatabai, professional poker player who was the runner-up to Norwegian poker player Annette Obrestad in the first World Series of Poker Europe Main Event.
- Neil Slatter, former professional footballer who began his career with Bristol Rovers in 1980, where he remained for five years before moving on to Oxford United.
- Ruth Picardie, journalist and editor who worked for The Guardian and The Independent newspapers, with contributions to other publications, such as the New Statesman, and author of Before I Say Goodbye, her memoir of living with breast cancer.
- Wade Barrett, wrestler.
- Rabbi Matondo, professional footballer for Scottish Premiership and UEFA Champions League side Rangers F.C. He has also represented his national side Wales, making his debut in a loss to Albania in Autumn 2018.
- Adam Thompson, Member of Parliament for Erewash
- Bethan Davies, a racewalker and 2018 Commonwealth Games Bronze Medallist.
