= Juman Malouf =

Lebanese writer, illustrator and costume designer

- Born: 5 December 1975 (age 50); Beirut, Lebanon
- Education: Brown University (BA); New York University (MFA)
- Partner: Wes Anderson
- Parent: Hanan al-Shaykh (mother)
- Website: jumanmalouf.com

Juman Malouf (born 5 December 1975) is a Lebanese fashion designer, costume designer, illustrator, and author.

== Early life and education ==
Malouf was born in Beirut, Lebanon. She is the daughter of Lebanese novelist Hanan al-Shaykh. She was six months old when her family fled to the United Kingdom following the events of the Lebanese Civil War. They spent two years in London before moving to Saudi Arabia, where her father, construction engineer Fouad Malouf, was based. They spent six years in Khobar, before moving back to London.

Malouf attended Brown University where she earned a Bachelor of Arts degree in Fine Art and Art History. She later attended New York University Tisch School of the Arts and earned a Master of Fine Arts degree in set and costume design.

== Career ==
After graduation, Malouf started her early-aughts cult fashion design company Charlotte Corday. She also worked as an assistant to the stylist Yvonne Sporre, before turning her full attention to illustration.

Malouf's first book, The Trilogy of Two, is a children's fantasy novel published in 2018 by Pushkin Press. She worked on Trilogy for about six years, while also collaborating on Wes Anderson's films The Grand Budapest Hotel and Moonrise Kingdom.

== Personal life ==
Malouf met her romantic partner, film director Wes Anderson, in 2009. The couple have one child. Malouf splits time between Paris and New York City.

Malouf voiced a minor role in Anderson's Fantastic Mr. Fox. Malouf and Anderson also co-curated the exhibition Spitzmaus Mummy in a Coffin and other Treasures, at the Kunsthistorisches Museum, Vienna, later published as a book.
