= Pink Chanel suit of Jacqueline Kennedy =

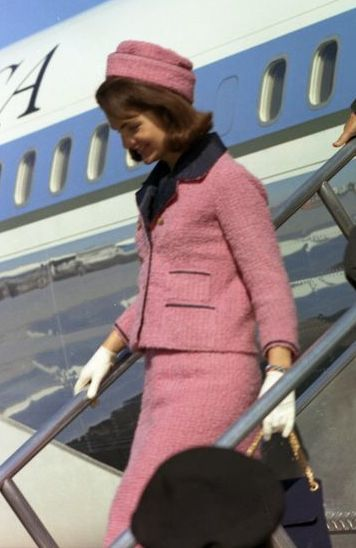
Kennedy descending from Air Force One at Dallas Love Field on the day of her husband's assassination

Jacqueline Bouvier Kennedy was wearing a pink suit that was styled in the fashion of Chanel when her husband, U.S. president John F. Kennedy, was assassinated in Dallas, Texas, on November 22, 1963. She insisted on wearing the suit, stained with his blood, during the swearing-in of Lyndon B. Johnson that afternoon and for the flight back to Washington, D.C. Jacqueline Kennedy was a fashion icon, and the suit is the most referenced and revisited among her clothing items.

Made of wool bouclé, the double-breasted raspberry pink and navy trim collared suit was matched with a trademark pink pillbox hat and white gloves. A long-time question among fashion historians and experts was whether the suit was made by Chanel in France or a quality copy purchased from New York's Chez Ninon. In her 2010 authorized biography of Coco Chanel, Justine Picardie stated that the suit was made and fitted for Kennedy at Chez Ninon.

On October 27, 2026, a documentary, Le luxe, un pouvoir français : comment Dior, Chanel et Hermès ont conquis le monde, was broadcast in France. The documentary covers an internal review of Chanel's historical sales ledgers from 1961 to 1963. According to the documentary, Chanel's archivists confirmed that Letizia Mowinckel (Jackie's fashion scout in Paris) purchased the authentic Parisian haute couture creation (Suit No. 44) directly through her dedicated saleswoman in Paris, Mme Suzanne. The documentary also includes a telegram from the White House dated December 2, 1961, from Letitia "Tish" Baldrige (Jackie Kennedy's social secretary) to Mowinckel requesting the purchase of Chanel berets in "matching wool and trim for pink suit and white suit navy trim. Need subito".

== The suit as fashion ==
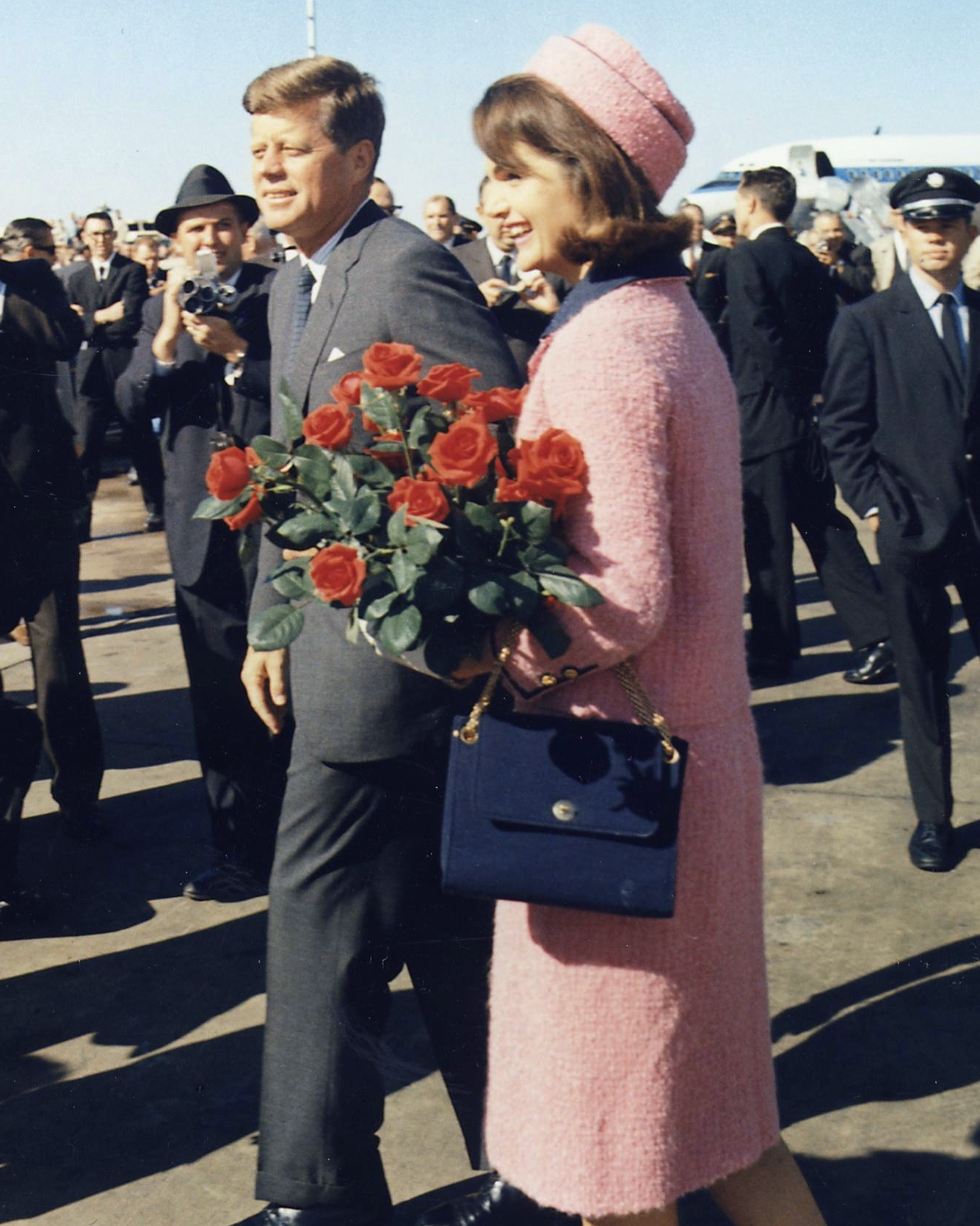
The Kennedys arriving in Dallas

In the late 1950s and early 1960s, the Chanel suit was one of the strongest symbols of bourgeois female chic that could be found anywhere in the Western world; the appearance of the suit was described by fashion critics as evoking an image of "a sophisticated, intelligent and independent modern woman". During this era it became the "wardrobe staple of the upwardly mobile American female which could fit almost every daytime occasion that required a woman to dress stylishly". Although women wearing pink in the 21st century is common, pink was new to fashion in the 1950s and was a color loved and even popularized to an extent in American fashion by Mamie Eisenhower, who endorsed a color which, according to cultural historian Karal Ann Marling, was called "Mamie Pink". Given that the Chanel suit was a strong statement of an independent woman, the color pink has an element of traditional femininity, perhaps evading the foreign and feminist attributes associated with the Chanel suit in a conservative American society.

Before John F. Kennedy departed for Texas he asked his wife what she planned to wear. In an interview with William Manchester after the tragedy, Kennedy said that her husband had told her:

"There are going to be all these rich, Republican women at that lunch ... wearing mink coats and diamond bracelets. And you've got to look as marvelous as any of them. Be simple – show these Texans what good taste really is." So she tramped in and out of his room, holding dresses in front of her. The outfits finally chosen – weather permitting – were all veterans of her wardrobe: beige and white dresses, blue and yellow suits, and, for Dallas, a pink suit with a navy blue collar and a matching pink pillbox hat.

It was said that the pink suit was one of her husband's "particular favorites"; the suit had first been shown by Coco Chanel in her 1961 autumn/winter collection. Photographs exist of Mrs. Kennedy wearing the suit – or one very similar to it – in Washington, D.C. in November 1961; to church on November 12, 1961; in London on March 26, 1962; in Washington, D.C. in September 1962; in Lafayette Square on September 26, 1962; at the visit by the Prime Minister of Algeria on October 15, 1962; and the visit of the Maharaja of Jaipur on October 23, 1962. After the last of these occasions, she was apparently not photographed wearing it until the day of the assassination, when she was pictured in it at Fort Worth and Dallas leading up to the assassination, having been revealed wearing it after stepping out of Air Force One at Love Field.

The suit was double-breasted, with six gold buttons and four square pockets, two on each side. The fabric was a lightweight wool from English firm Linton Tweeds in a nubby weave known as bouclé. The color was raspberry although most press reports described it as strawberry pink. The wide quilted collar, jacket lining, piping trim on the sleeves, and at the top of each pocket was navy blue silk. There were two gold buttons on each sleeve. The buttons on the suit had navy blue piping around the edge. A clever feature of Chanel jackets was a small gold chain sewn along the inside bottom edge of the jacket to provide just enough weight for it to hang straight. The suit came with a sleeveless navy silk shell blouse. For cool weather, Kennedy would wear a matching navy silk scarf knotted at the neck and tucked into the front of the jacket, which she did in Dallas. Accompanying the suit was a trademark pillbox hat in matching pink with a band of navy piping around the crown. She secured the hat to her head with a standard hatpin. Kennedy carried a navy handbag with a gold buckle and gold chain handle. She wore low-heeled navy shoes with a small gold ornament at the toe. A gold bangle bracelet on her left wrist and short white kid leather gloves with tiny pearl wrist buttons completed her outfit. Most of the American public viewing pictures of the presidential couple on television and in newspapers between 1961 and 1963 would not have known the color of the suit, given that at the time of the assassination TV news was still in black and white and newspapers did not print color photographs. The color of the suit became widely known only after the publication of color photos in Life magazine's JFK memorial issue November 29, 1963, and in Life's Warren Commission report issue October 2, 1964.

=== Authenticity ===
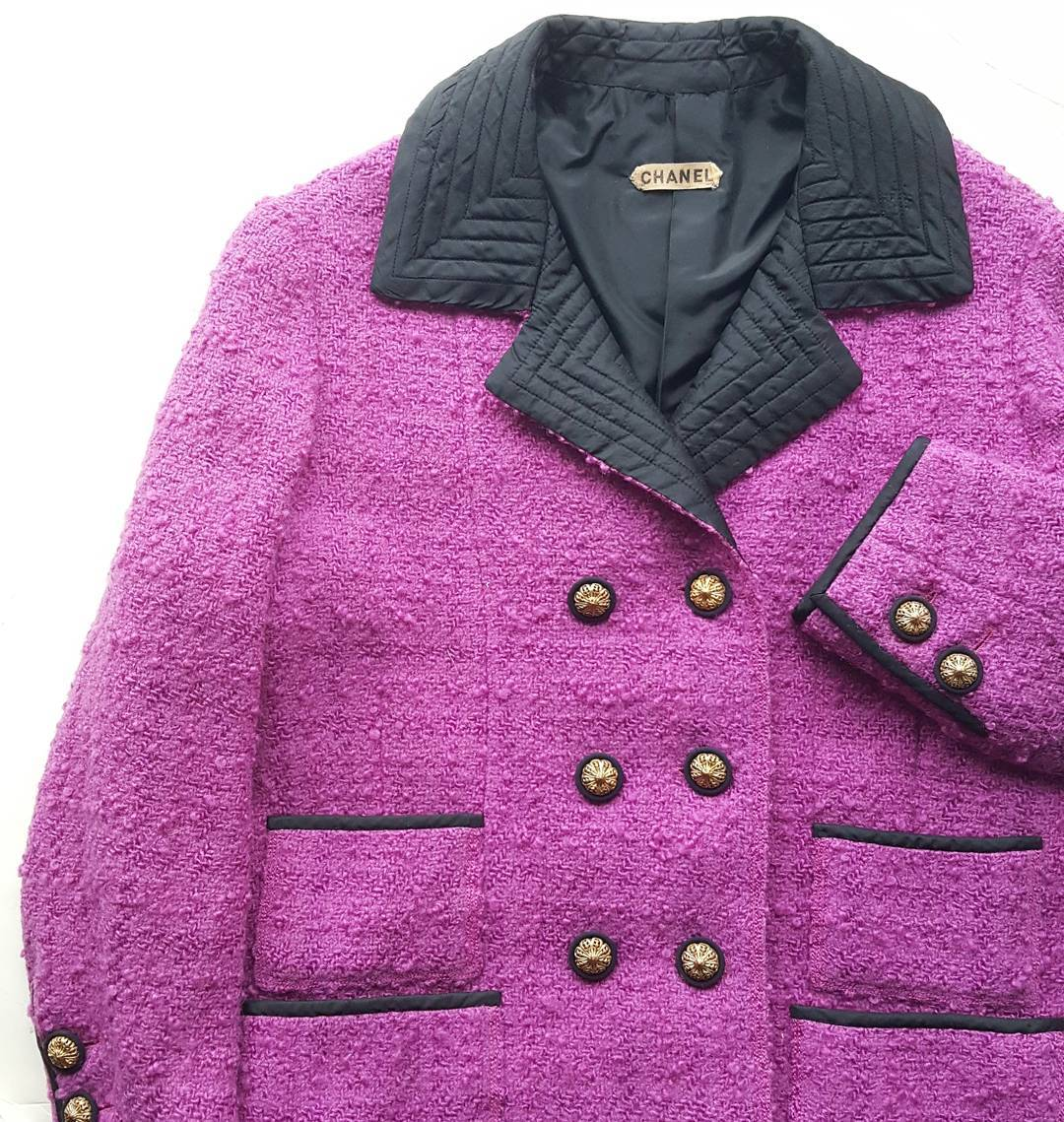
Chanel Haute Couture jacket, F/W 1961. Kennedy's suit was procured directly from Chanel by her fashion adviser, Letizia Mowinckel. The jacket pictured is a separate original Chanel haute couture jacket in a similar raspberry pink, but with black silk trim. Adnan Ege Kutay Collection.

There was long a question among fashion historians and experts whether the suit was made by Chanel in France or a garment purchased from New York's Chez Ninon, a popular dress shop that imported European label designs and materials and put them together in the United States. A number of sources claimed it was more than likely a version of a Chanel pink bouclé wool suit trimmed with a navy blue collar, some asserting it was made by Chez Ninon in 1961. Further complicating the matter was the indisputable fact that the First Lady's "official" designer was Oleg Cassini, who provided much of her public as well as private wardrobe. In her 2010 authorized biography of Coco Chanel, Justine Picardie stated that the fabric, buttons and trim for the jacket came from Chanel in Paris, from which the suit was made and fitted for Kennedy at Chez Ninon.

In February 2026 Letizia Mowinckel died at the age of 105. Obituaries published in The New York Times and The Times subsequently documented her role as Jackie’s fashion scout in Paris and her involvement in procuring the pink Chanel suit that came to symbolize the first lady’s resolve in the wake of her husband’s assassination. Jackie Kennedy had extensive correspondence with Mrs. Mowinckel. In one letter she responded that she preferred the pink suit (from some recommendations that Mrs. Mowinckel had provided) and included a sketch of what she wanted, with her measurements. Mrs. Mowinckel went to Chanel and dealt with a saleswoman named Suzanne, to whom she concocted an elaborate tale about a cousin of hers, a Sicilian princess forbidden by her husband to travel. After some discussion and the approval by Mme. Chanel, the suit was ordered and delivered to the Mowinckel residence at rue de Grenelle to be forwarded to the White House via the U.S. Embassy in Paris.

The suit in 1963 was estimated to cost $800 to $1,000 ($8,400 to $10,500 in 2025 dollars).

== Assassination ==
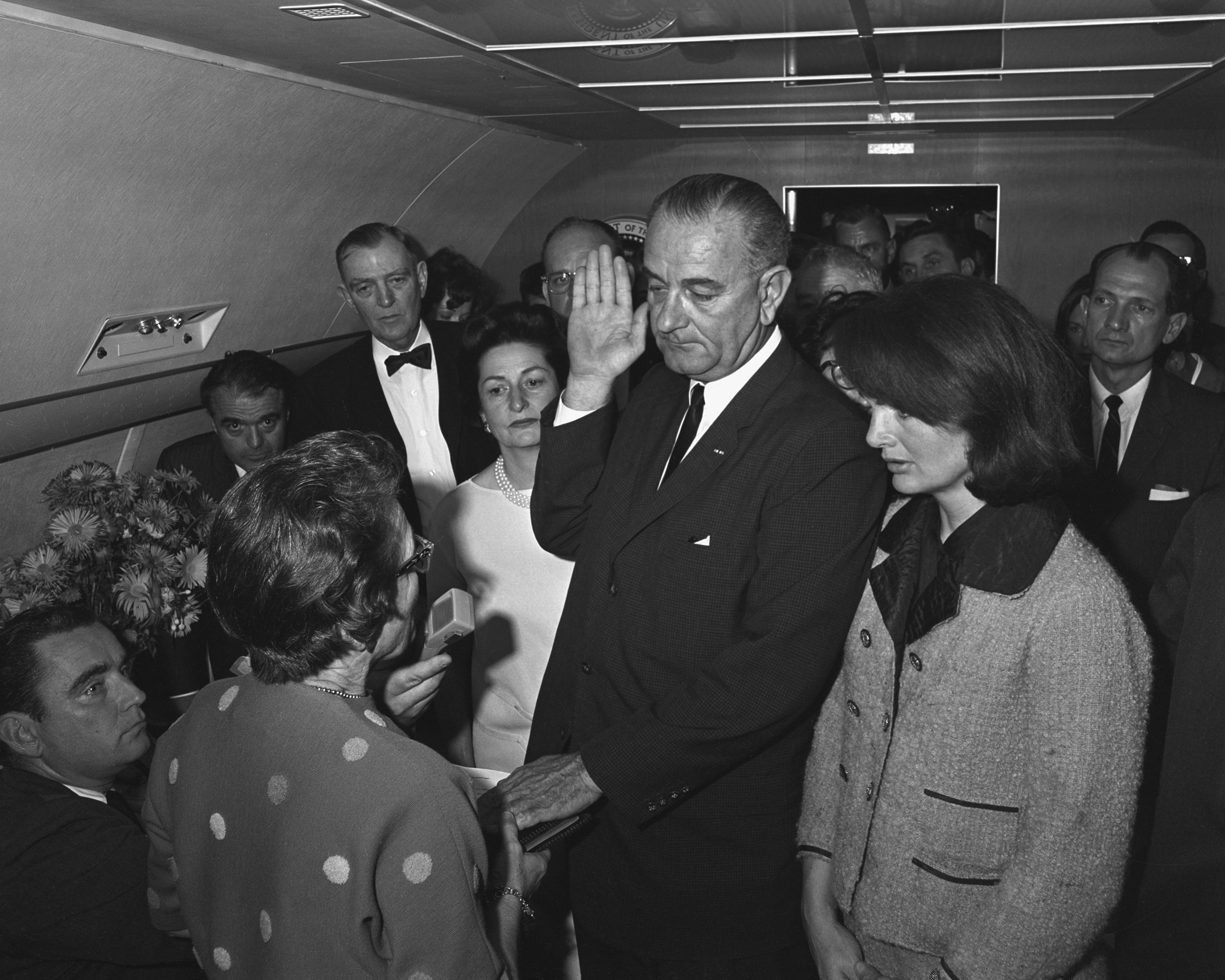
Jacqueline Kennedy wearing her blood-stained pink suit while Johnson takes the oath of office as president

Kennedy was seated to the left side of the President in the back seat of the open-top presidential limousine as the vehicle traveled through local streets in Dallas. Immediately after he was shot in the head, her suit was spattered by his blood.

Upon arriving at Parkland Hospital, Vice President Lyndon B. Johnson's wife Lady Bird saw the car and said:

I cast one last look over my shoulder and saw in the President's car a bundle of pink, just like a drift of blossoms, lying in the back seat. It was Mrs. Kennedy lying over the President's body.

At the hospital, Kennedy continued to wear the blood-stained suit, but she had removed her hat. William Manchester wrote in his 1967 book The Death of a President:

The Lincoln flew down the boulevard's central lane; her pillbox hat, caught in an eddy of whipping wind, slid down over her forehead, and with a violent movement she yanked it off and flung it down. The hatpin tore out a hank of her own hair. She didn't even feel the pain.

The whereabouts of the hat today are unknown, and the last person known to have had it—her personal secretary, Mary Gallagher—refused to disclose its location before her death in 2022. In The Death of a President, Manchester reported that the hat was taken back to the White House, where it was given to Agent Bob Foster of the Secret Service, but nothing further is known.

Several people asked Kennedy whether she would like to change her suit but she refused. When Lady Bird offered to send someone to help her, she responded:

Oh, no ... I want them to see what they have done to Jack.

Despite the advice of John F. Kennedy's physician, Admiral George Burkley, who "gently tried to persuade her to change out of her gore-soaked pink Chanel suit", she wore the suit alongside Vice President Johnson as he was sworn in on Air Force One as the 36th President of the United States. When photographed during the ceremony, the blood stains were not visible since they were on the right-hand side of her suit. Lady Bird recalls that during the swearing-in:

Her hair [was] falling in her face but [she was] very composed ... I looked at her. Mrs. Kennedy's dress was stained with blood. One leg was almost entirely covered with it and her right glove was caked, it was caked with blood – her husband's blood. Somehow that was one of the most poignant sights – that immaculate woman, exquisitely dressed, and caked in blood.

Kennedy had no regrets about refusing to take the blood-stained suit off. Her only regret was that she had washed the blood off her face before Johnson was sworn in.

== Aftermath ==
When Jacqueline Kennedy finally removed her suit the following morning, her maid folded it and placed it in a box. Some days after the assassination, this box was dispatched to Kennedy's mother, Janet Lee Auchincloss, who wrote "November 22nd 1963" on the top of the box and stored it in her attic. Eventually, the box was given to the National Archives in Maryland, together with an unsigned note bearing the Auchincloss letterhead stationery. The note read: "Jackie's suit and bag worn Nov. 22, 1963". The suit, which was never cleaned, is kept out of public view in "an acid-free container in a windowless room ... the precise location is kept secret. The temperature hovers between 65 and 68 °F (18 and 20 °C); the humidity is 40 percent; the air is changed six times an hour."

Kennedy continued to buy Chanel clothes for a time after the assassination.

== Historical significance ==
Kennedy's Chanel suit has been variously described as "a famous pink suit which will forever be embedded in America's historical conscience", "one of those indelible images Americans had stored: Jackie in the blood-stained pink Chanel suit", "the most legendary garment in American history", and "emblematic of the ending of innocence".

The garment is now stored out of public view in the National Archives. It will not be seen by the public until at least 2103, according to a deed of Caroline Kennedy, Kennedy's sole surviving heir. At that time, when the 100-year deed expires, the Kennedy family descendants will renegotiate the matter.

== Cultural references ==
The suit has been well referenced and replicated in theater and film. In 2011, a copy of the suit appeared in the mini-series The Kennedys. However, the Chanel copy was recreated by Giorgio Armani. Costume designer Madeline Fontaine recreated the suit for the 2016 film Jackie, with Natalie Portman portraying Kennedy; the buttons, chain, and label were provided by Chanel. Costume designer Jane Petrie recreated the suit for the eighth episode of the second season of The Crown, titled "Dear Mrs. Kennedy". In the Simpsons 1996 episode "Scenes from the Class Struggle in Springfield", the Chanel outfit worn by Marge Simpson (whose maiden name is Bouvier in a nod to the former First Lady) was modelled upon Kennedy's suit.

Composer Steve Heitzeg's Death Suite for Jackie O is the first musical reference to the pink suit; the second movement is entitled "The Pink Suit ('Let Them See What They Have Done')".

== See also ==
- List of individual dresses
