= Lotfia Elnadi =

Egyptian aviator (1907–2002)

Lotfia El Nadi
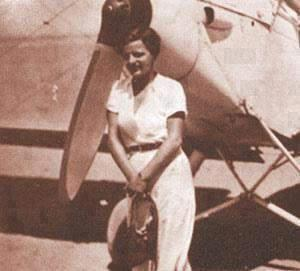
- Born: October 29, 1907; Cairo, Khedivate of Egypt
- Died: 2002 (aged 94–95); Cairo, Egypt
- Occupation: Aviator
- Known for: One of the first female pilots in the world and the first Egyptian woman to fly a plane from Cairo and Alexandria, Egypt.

Lotfia Elnadi (Arabic: لطفية النادي; October 29, 1907 – 2002) was an Egyptian aviator. She was the first Egyptian woman as well as the first woman from the Arab world and Africa to earn a pilot's license.

== Early life ==
Lotfia Elnadi was born on 29 October 1907 into an upper-class family in Cairo. After completion of her primary education, it was expected that she would marry, becoming a housewife and mother. Her father, who worked for the government printing office, Matbaa Amiriya, saw no reason for Elnadi to pursue secondary education. Her mother encouraged her to attend the American College for Girls with its modern curriculum and focus as a language school.

Elnadi read an article about a flying school which had just opened in Cairo and determined that she would attend, despite her father's objections. Initially she approached a journalist to assist her, but when he refused, she went directly to the director of EgyptAir, Kamal Elwi, asking for assistance. He saw the potential for publicity and agreed to help. As Elnadi had no way to pay for the flying lessons, she worked as the secretary and telephone operator for the flying school in exchange for her tuition.

== Flying career ==
Telling her father that she was attending a bi-weekly study group, Elnadi took flight lessons, with 33 male classmates. When Elnadi earned her pilot’s licence, on 27 September 1933, she became the first African as well as Arab woman pilot in the world, after only 67 days of study. Her father was angry, but seeing the favorable press Elnadi received, his anger dissipated and he allowed her to take him on a flight over the pyramids. Her achievement made headlines throughout the world.

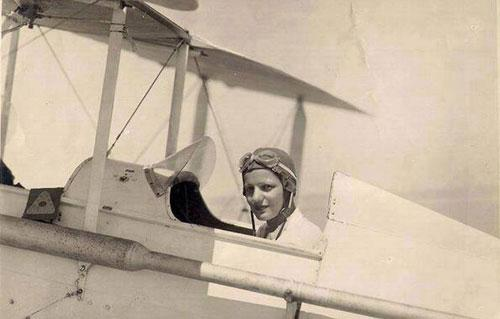
Lotfia Elnadi in a plane, 1933.

On 19 December 1933, Elnadi flew in the international race between Cairo and Alexandria. Flying at speeds averaging 100 miles per hour, she steered her single-engine plane to the finish-line before any of the other competitors. She received a prize of £E200 and the congratulations of King Fuad for her attempt. Huda Sha'arawi, a feminist leader, also sent salutations for the inspiration Elnadi provided and then held a fundraising drive to buy Elnadi a plane of her own. Elnadi worked as the secretary general of the Egyptian Aviation Club and flew for about five years before she was injured in an accident which damaged her spine.

Following Elnadi’s example, for around a decade other Egyptian women attended flight training and became pilots. With the coming of the Second World War, no other women pilots trained up to 1945, until Dina-Carole El Sawy became a pilot for EgyptAir.

== Later life ==
After the flying accident, Elnadi, went to obtain medical treatment in Switzerland and remained there for many years. In 1989, she was invited back to Cairo to participate in the 54th anniversary of civil aviation in the country, where she received the Order of Merit of the Egyptian Organization of Aerospace Education. In 1992, she received the Ninety Nines Award of Merit. In 1996, a documentary film, Take Off From the Sand, was produced telling her story. In her 80s, she moved to Toronto, Canada to live with her nephew and his family for several years before moving to Cairo in her late 80s. She never married and died in Cairo in 2002.

== Legacy ==
In 2014, a Google Doodle celebrated her 107th birthday.

In 2017, a Google Doodle honoured her on International Women's Day.
