= Dan Guenther =

American poet

- Born: 1944 (age 81–82); Waukegan, Illinois, U.S.
- Education: Coe College; Iowa Writers' Workshop (MFA)
- Occupations: Novelist; poet

Dan Guenther (born 1944 in Waukegan, Illinois), is an American novelist and poet. A graduate of Coe College, he has a Master of Fine Arts from the Iowa Writers' Workshop. He was a captain in the U.S. Marine Corps. His poems and letters from Vietnam, during the Vietnam War, were included in the acclaimed novel, The Stones of Summer by Dow Mossman, published by Bobbs-Merrill in 1972 and republished by Barnes & Noble in 2003. In 2002, Guenther appeared in the documentary film Stone Reader by Mark Moskowitz. The film chronicled the director's attempt to revive and have republished the acclaimed book of seemingly vanished author Dow Mossman, a lifelong friend of Dan Guenther. The revival was successful.

High Country Solitudes (Grand River, 1997) is Dan Guenther's first book of poetry. He also has published poems in small magazines and anthologies, most recently, Open Range: Poetry of the Reimagined West, Ghost Road Press, 2007, and The Quadrant Book of Poetry 2001 – 2010, Quadrant Books, 2012, Sydney, Australia.

China Wind, the first novel in the Vietnam trilogy, was originally published in 1990. Dodge City Blues, the second novel in the trilogy, was published in 2007 and has been praised by Veteran Magazine for its realism. The third novel, Townsend's Solitaire, was published in 2008 and has been described by Veteran Magazine as Sam Gatlin's "readjustment blues."

Glossy Black Cockatoos, Guenther's fourth novel, was published in late 2009. It is set in Australia and Asia, among the Hmong. The Colorado Authors' League judged Glossy Black Cockatoos the Best Genre Fiction of 2010.

The Crooked Truth, Dan Guenther's second volume of poetry, was the 2011 winner for Poetry book in the Colorado Authors' League open competition. About The Crooked Truth, Vietnam Veterans Magazine literary critic David Willson stated, "There is no mawkish sentimentality anywhere in this little book because of Guenther’s plain-yet-elegant language. Dan Guenther remains one of the finest poets of the Vietnam War."

== Bibliography ==
Fiction

- China Wind, (Ivy Books, 1990); Redburn Press, 2006
- Dodge City Blues, Redburn Press, 2007
- Townsend's Solitaire, Redburn Press, 2008
- Glossy Black Cockatoos, Redburn Press, 2009

Poetry

- High Country Solitudes, Grand River Press, 1997
- The Crooked Truth, Redburn Press, 2010

Anthologies containing poetry

- Open Range: Poetry Of The Reimagined West, Ghost Road Press
- The Quadrant Book of Poetry 2001 – 2010, Quadrant Books, Sydney, Australia

Anthologies containing essays

- An Elevated View, Colorado Writers on Writing, Seven Oaks Publishing, 2011

Documentary Film Credits

Stone Reader (2002)

== Awards ==
Colorado Author Award 2008

Colorado Author Best Genre Fiction 2010

Colorado Author Award 2011

== Military awards and decorations ==
- Bronze Star with 'V' for Valor (Vietnam 1969)
- Combat Action Ribbon
- Navy and Marine Corps Presidential Unit Citation
- Meritorious Unit Commendation
- National Defense Service Medal
- RVN Vietnam Campaign Medal
- RVN Staff Service Medal - 1st Class (Vietnam 1969)
- RVN Gallantry Cross Unit Citation with Palm
- RVN Civil Action Unit Citation
- Vietnam Service Medal (4 campaign stars, Vietnam 1968–70)
