= Afifa Al Shartouni =

Lebanese author

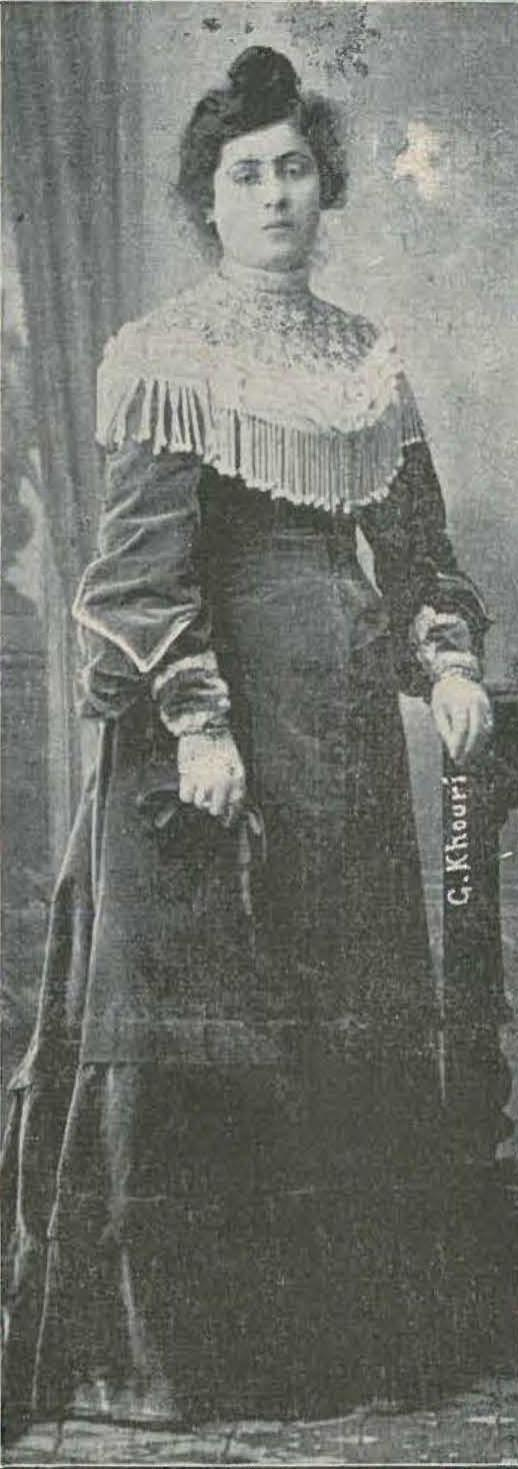

Afifa Al Shartouni (25 March 1886 – 6 February 1906) was a Lebanese author. Born in Beirut, she married Nasri Mousa and traveled with him to Brazil, where she died shortly after.

== Biography ==
Born in Beirut, Lebanon, on 25 March 1886, she spent her early days studying at Madrasat Al-Rahbat Al-Nassira, until her father transferred her to Aintoura school, and then to Taqadom school in Beirut. Along the way, she learned her native Arabic language, the French language, and the sciences. Under her father's guidance, she learned grammar and writing. She started writing and publishing her articles in local Lebanese papers such as Al-Moqtataf, Al-Moktabas, Al-Rawda, and many others.

In 1905, Afifa Al Shartouni married Nasri Mousa from Bikfaya, a town in Lebanon. She then traveled with him to Pará, Brazil.

She died in 1906 in Pará, Brazil.

== Published works ==
After her death, her father collected her and her sister's work and published them as a book named "نفحات الوردتين" as a tribute to his late daughters. Unfortunately, the book appears to be lost to time, as the publisher "Dar Al-Moktabas" kept no records of it, and none of the Lebanese national libraries have it.

== See also ==
- List of Lebanese women writers
- Lebanese writers
- Women in Lebanon
