= The Story of Zahra =

1980 novel by Hanan al-Shaykh

- Cover of the 1996 English edition
- Author: Hanan al-Shaykh
- Original title: حكاية زهرة
- Translator: Peter Ford
- Language: Arabic
- Set in: Beirut, capital of Lebanon
- Published: 1980 (English translation 1986)
- Publication place: Lebanon
- Media type: Novel

The Story of Zahra (Arabic: حِكَاية زَهْرَة, romanized: ḥikāyat zahra) is a novel by Lebanese author Hanan al-Shaykh. It was first published in Arabic in 1980, and in English in 1986 by Anchor Books. The novel is set in Beirut before and during the Lebanese Civil War, and tells the story of a woman named Zahra, whose struggles with her family and country lead to her suffering and eventual death.

== Plot ==
The novel is split into two sections; the first takes place before the start of the Lebanese Civil War, and the second part whilst it is ongoing.

=== Part one ===
At the start of the novel, Zahra is a young Lebanese girl living in Beirut with her mother, father and brother. She is mistreated and abused by her family; her mother forces her to accompany her when she has sex with other men in hotels, and her father beats and whips her. Zahra is sexually abused by a friend of her brother named Malek and undergoes two abortions. To escape the abuse she suffers in Lebanon as well as the shame brought on her by her abortions, Zahra then flees to an unnamed African country, where she lives with her uncle Hashim. Hashim is living in exile after trying to overthrow President Fouad Chehab. Hashim sees in Zahra an extension of his homeland; he seeks to have sex with her, attempting to rape Zahra. Zahra thus marries another Lebanese man living in Africa, Majed, to escape the harassment of her uncle's home. Majed is from a poor family and living in Africa in an attempt to improve his economic situation. The wedding is short-lived, ending in divorce.

=== Part two ===
After her divorce from Majed, Zahra returns to Beirut. The Lebanese Civil War has begun at this point, and Zahra at first lives a very basic life, trying to avoid the war as much as possible. After a while, Zahra is raped by a sniper called Sami. However, Zahra enjoys the rape, experiencing her first orgasm. She subsequently begins a relationship with Sami, hoping that by doing so she is distracting him and thus stopping Sami from killing people. Zahra soon becomes pregnant, and tells Sami, who initially tells her to get an abortion, before seemingly changing his mind and proposing to marry Zahra. Zahra starts walking home, happy about the marriage proposal. However, the sniper then deliberately shoots and kills Zahra in the street.

== Background ==
The novel contains some autobiographical elements. Hanan al-Shaykh's father was strict and very religious, and her mother used Hanan and her sister as cover for her clandestine affair with a man, in a similar way to Zahra's mother in The Story of Zahra. Al-Shaykh has said that she was "obsessed with a sniper, that he'd kill me one day," which is perhaps the reason for the inclusion of the sniper in the novel.

== Publication history ==
The original Arabic novel was first published in Beirut in 1980. It was turned down by 9 different publishers due to its controversial content.The English translation by Peter Ford was first published in 1986 by Quartet.
