= Dow Mossman =

American writer (born 1943)

Dow Mossman (born 1943 in Cedar Rapids, Iowa) is an American writer, known for his novel The Stones of Summer.

== Life and career ==
Dow Mossman studied at Coe College for two years, finished college at the University of Iowa and received his Master of Fine Arts from the Iowa Writers' Workshop in 1969.

His novel The Stones of Summer was published by Bobbs-Merrill in 1972 and Popular Library a year later. Following the publication of the novel, Mossman was mentally exhausted and spent several months in an Iowa sanitorium. The novel soon went out of print. One element of the novel is poems and letters from Vietnam sent by Marine officer Dan Guenther (U.of Iowa, MFA, 1973), who later published the novels China Wind (Ivy, 1990) and Dodge City Blues (Redburn Press, 2007).

=== Stone Reader ===
In 2002, Mossman was the subject of the documentary film Stone Reader by Mark Moskowitz, which chronicled the director's attempt to resuscitate the acclaimed book and speak to its seemingly vanished author.

The film shows Mossman currently living in the home he grew up in, which is filled with books. According to the film, Mossman writes on the porch, and is currently working on a book based on notes he has taken from watching hundreds of old movies. In addition to that book, he is also working on a book of poetry.

Prior to Stone Reader, Mossman had been employed for 19 years as a welder, before quitting his job to look after his aging mother until her death, after which he returned to work as a paper bundler for the local newspaper. After the film's release, The Stones of Summer was re-published by Barnes & Noble. He is now semi-retired.

== External sources ==
- New York Times (February 12, 2003) Recounting Obsession With a 1972 Author. [Review, "The Stone Reader"].
- NPR (June 17, 2003) "The Stone Reader" [Interview, "The Stone Reader"].
- The Observer (August 3, 2003). On the trail of a lost genius. [Review, "The Stone Reader"].
