= Yusuf Idris =

Egyptian writer, playwright, and novelist (1927–1991)

- يوسف إدريس
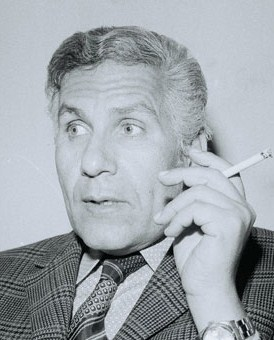
- Yusuf Idris
- Born: 19 May 1927; Faqous, Sharqia, Kingdom of Egypt
- Died: 1 August 1991 (aged 64); London, United Kingdom
- Website: Yusuf Idris at IMDb

Yusuf Idris, also spelled Yusof Idris (Arabic: يوسف إدريس; May 19, 1927 – August 1, 1991) was an Egyptian writer of plays, short stories, and novels.

== Biography ==
Idris was born in Faqous. He originally trained to be a doctor, studying at Cairo University. He sought to put the foundations of a modern Egyptian theatre based on popular traditions and folklore; his main success in this quest was his most famous work, a play called "Al-Farafeer" (الفرافير) depicting two main characters: the Master and the Farfour (poor layman). For some time he was a regular writer in the daily newspaper Al-Ahram.

From the English edition of The Cheapest Nights:

"While a medical student his work against Farouk’s regime and the British led to his imprisonment and suspension from College. After graduation, he worked at Kasr el Eini, the largest government hospital in Egypt. He supported Nasser’s rise to power but became disillusioned in 1954 at the time when his first collection of stories The Cheapest Nights was published … Yusuf Idris’ stories are powerful and immediate reflections of the experiences of his own rebellious life. His continuing contact with the struggling poor enables him to portray characters sensitively and imaginatively".

== Personal life ==
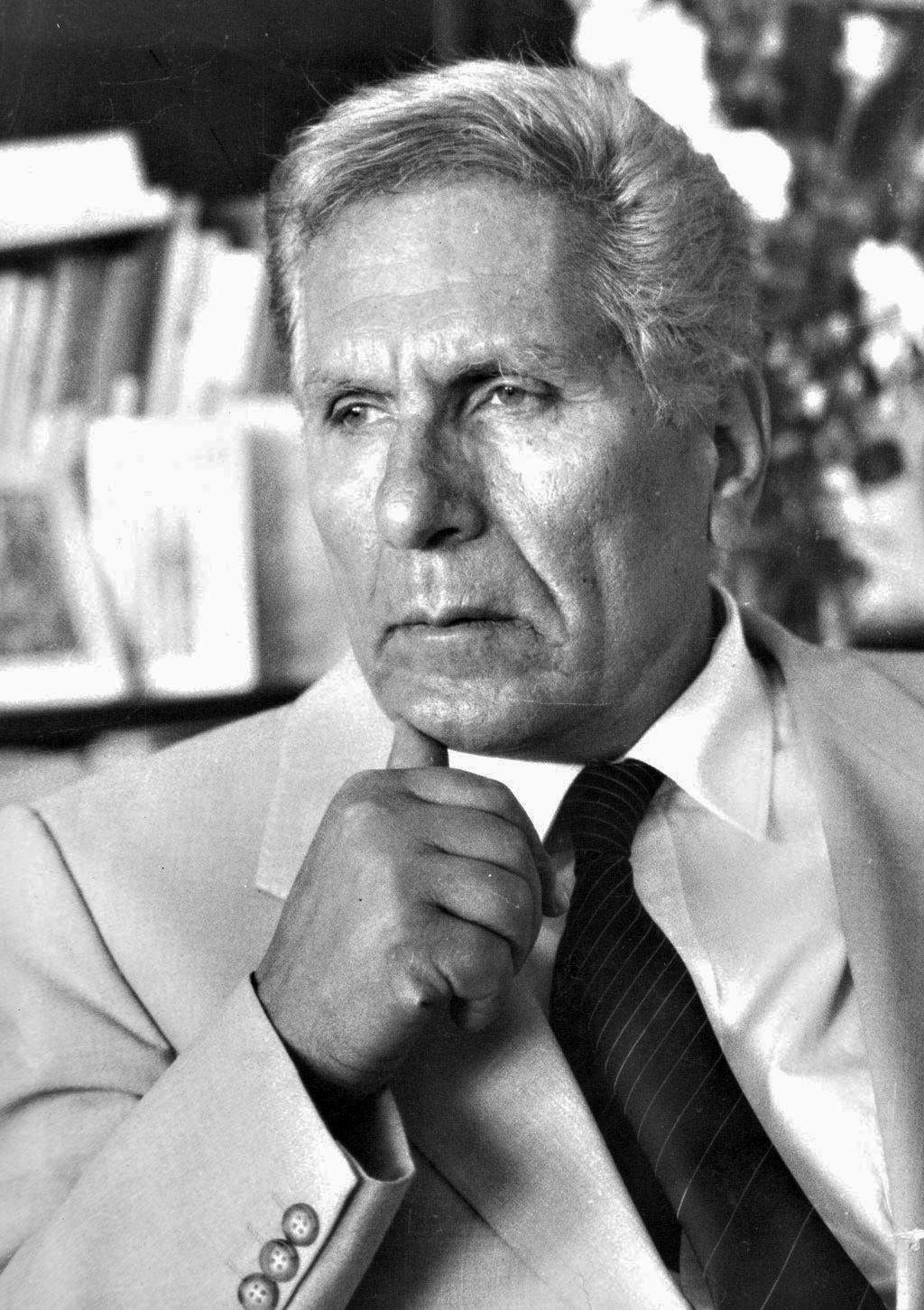

He married Raja al-Refai, with whom he had three children. His daughter Nesma is also a published writer.

== Works in English ==
- Idris, Yusuf: The Cheapest Nights and Other Stories 1978, Peter Owen, London, (First UK edition), translated by Wadida Wassef, ISBN 0-7206-0518-0 (in the UNESCO Collection of Representative Works)
- Idris, Yusuf: The Sinners 1984, U.S.A., (First English Language Edition.) (many reprints) ISBN 0-89410-393-8
- Idris, Yusuf: Rings of Burnished Brass 1992, American University in Cairo Press, ISBN 977-424-248-3 (translator: Catherine Cobham)
- Idris, Yusuf: City of Love and Ashes 1999, American University in Cairo Press, ISBN 977-424-501-6

== Principal works ==
Short Stories

- The Cheapest Nights. أرخص ليالى
- Isn't it ? أليس كذلك ؟
- Dregs of the city. قاع المدينة
- The Hero. البطل
- An incident of Honour. حادثة شرف
- The End of the world. آخر الدنيا
- Tha Language of Oh Oh. لغة الآى آى
- The summons. النداهة
- A House of Flesh بيت من لحم
- I am Sultan of the law of existence. أنا سلطان قانون الوجود
- The Freak

Plays

- The Cotton King & Farahat's republic. Two Plays ملك القطن و جمهورية فرحات
- The Critical Moment.اللحظة الحرجة
- Al-Farafir. الفرافير
- Earthly Comedy. المهزلة الأرضية
- The striped Ones. المخططين
- The Third Sex. الجنس الثالث
- Towards an Arabic Drama نحو مسرح عربى
- The Harlequin البهلوان

Novels and Novellas

- Farahat's Republic & A Love story. [Two novellas] جمهورية فرحات و قصة حب
- The Sin. الحرام
- The Disgrace. العيب
- Men and Bulls, The Black Soldier, Mrs. Vienna. [Novellas] رجال وثيران- العسكرى الأسود- السيدة فيينا
- The White. البيضاء

Other writings

- Not very frankly speaking. بصراحة غير مطلقة
- Discovery of a continent. إكتشاف قارة
- The Will. الإرادة
- Diary of Dr. yusuf Idris. مفكرة الدكتور يوسف إدريس
- The '60s Gabarty. جبرتى الستينات

== Awards and honours ==
Idris won the 1997 Naguib Mahfouz Medal for Literature for his novel City of Love and Ashes.
