= Suad al Lamkiyah =

Omani lawyer (1938– 2021)

- سعاد اللمكية
- Born: November 26, 1938; Rustaq
- Died: May 7, 2021
- Occupation: Lawyer

Suad bint Mohammed al Lamkiya (Arabic: سعاد بنت محمد بن ناصر اللمكية; November 26, 1938 – May 7, 2021) was as Omani lawyer, known for being the first female lawyer in Oman and second Arab female judge.

== Biography ==
Lamkiyah was born on November 26, 1938 in Hilat al Dhahir, Rustaq. Educated at the St. Joseph's Convent School in Zanzibar, Lamkiyah later attended the American School for Girls in Cairo, and Alexandra College in Dublin. In 1959, Lamkiyah began studying law at the School of Law, Trinity College Dublin and was later called to the Bar on October 29, 1963. Lamkiyah was the 54th woman to be called to the Irish Bar.

Lamkiyah began working as a lawyer in 1966 in a number of government agencies. In 1971, Lamkiyah was the first woman to become a public prosecutor in Tanzania, and the next year the second woman to become a judge there. Starting in 1974, Lamkiyah returned to Oman and worked for a number companies, Omantel, Petroleum Development Oman, and the Abu Dhabi National Oil Company. Lamkiyah worked for the Omani Ministry of Legal Affairs from 1994 until her retirement.

On May 7, 2021 Lamkiyah died aged 82. Lamkiyah had two children.
