= Hoda Barakat =

Lebanese novelist

Hoda Barakat هدى بركات
- Born: 1952 (age 73–74); Lebanon
- Occupations: writer, novelist

Hoda Barakat (Arabic: هدى بركات; born 1952) is a Lebanese novelist. She lived most of her early life in Beirut before moving to Paris, where she now resides. She has published six novels, two plays, a book of short stories, and a book of memoirs. Her works are originally written in Arabic and have been translated into English, Hebrew, French, Italian, Spanish, Turkish, Romanian, Dutch, Brazilian Portuguese, and Greek.

Her work often explores themes of trauma and war; three of her early novels are narrated by male characters living in the margins of society during the Lebanese civil war.

== Biography ==
Barakat was raised in the Maronite Christian town of Bsharré, Lebanon. After moving to Beirut, Barakat studied French Literature at the Lebanese University, from which she graduated in 1975. In 1975 and 1976, she lived in Paris, where she worked towards a PhD, but she decided to return home when the Lebanese Civil War started. During this period, she worked as a teacher, translator, and journalist. In 1985, she released her first formal publication, a collection of short stories called Za'irat ("Women Visitors").

She moved back to Paris in 1989 and has lived there ever since, publishing her remaining works from Paris, including Hajar al-Dahik (The Stone of Laughter, 1990) and Ahl el-Hawa (People of Love, 1993), among others. In addition to writing, she has also worked in radio broadcasting.

In 2004, she visited the United Kingdom on the first Banipal Live UK tour. Between 2010 and 2011, she was appointed as a fellow in Nantes Institute for Advanced Study Foundation. In fall 2013, Barakat was appointed the first Arabic Scholar in Residence at the University of Texas at Austin Middle Eastern Studies Program. She was also recently visiting professor of Middle Eastern Studies at Dartmouth College and Artist in Residence at the Institute for Advanced Study at Central European University.

=== Personal life ===
She married the poet Mohammad El Abdallah (Arabic: محمد العبدالله), whom she met in college. She acquired French nationality by naturalization on 24 March 1998.

== Works translated into English ==
- The Stone of Laughter, Interlink Books, New York, 1995, ISBN 9781566561976
- The Tiller of Waters, American University in Cairo Press, Cairo, 2001, ISBN 9789774246906
- Disciples of Passion, Syracuse University Press, Syracuse, 2005, ISBN 9780815608332
- Hoda Barakat's Sayyidi wa habibi: the authorized abridged edition for students of Arabic, Georgetown University Press, Washington DC, 2013, ISBN 9781626160026
- Voices of the Lost, Oneworld, London, 2021 ISBN 9781786077226

== Awards ==
Barakat's first work Hajar al-Dahik (The Stone of Laughter), which is the first Arabic work to have a gay man as its main character, won the Al-Naqid prize.

Her third novel, Harit al-miyah (The Tiller of Waters), won the 2001 Naguib Mahfouz Medal for Literature.

Her 2019 novel Bareed Al-Layl ("The Night Mail") won the 2019 International Prize for Arabic Fiction (IPAF); it was thereafter translated into English by Marilyn Booth and published in English under the title Voices of the Lost. Barakat is the second woman to have ever won the IPAF. She was previously longlisted for the IPAF in 2013, for her novel Malakoot hadhahi al-ard ("The Kingdom of This Earth").

She was decorated with the Chevalier de l'Ordre des Arts et des Lettres in 2002 and the Chevalier de l'Ordre national du Mérite in 2008.
