= Nadia Sahari =

Nadia Simone Sahari
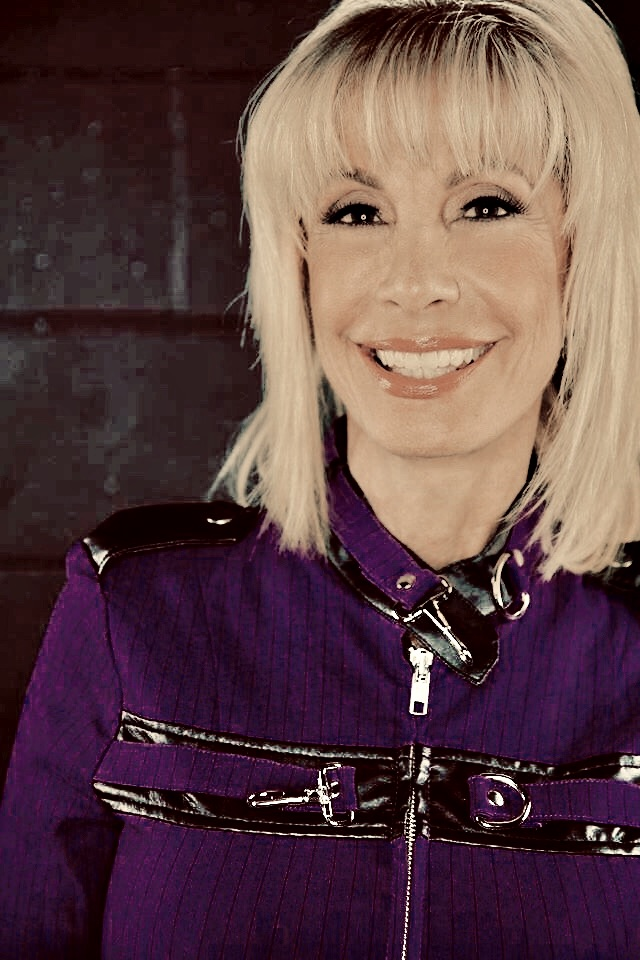
- Born: Nadia Simone Berri; Beirut, Lebanon
- Citizenship: USA
- Education: University of the Incarnate Word, San Antonio
- Occupations: Actress, producer, author, radio host, record label
- Website: www.nadiasahari.com

Nadia Sahari is an actress, author, producer, talk show host, singer and entrepreneur.

She has appeared in several movies including Bandslam and Corruption.Gov and in the TV series Friday Night Lights and Lust 'n' Love, which she created and wrote and in which she plays the female lead. In addition, she has produced two movies: Smoke 'N' Love and The Con-Test. She has a radio show where she interviews celebrities, authors, filmmakers, actors, casting directors, musicians, and other media personalities.

She was the cover girl for the February/March 2008 issue of Country Woman Magazine, in 2012 and 2013, May 2013 cover girl for Latin Connection Magazine, and cover girl for the August 2013 issue of The Platform Magazine.

Nadia's memoir Breakaway: The Road To Freedom, describing her survival of abuse, is now in its second printing. She has written a children's book called The Bully Cat and a business manual, Be Your Own Boss.

Nadia has opened four boutiques and a national vitamin company which grossed $1.5 million during its first year.

Nadia is of Lebanese, Italian, and French descent. She was born in Beirut, Lebanon, and raised in a Detroit suburb of Michigan. In high school she studied music and the arts. She became a professional belly dancer, opening a school where she taught belly dancing. After marriage and two children she studied theater at the University of the Incarnate Word in San Antonio, Texas.
