= Beirut Blues =

1992 novel by Hanan al-Shaykh

- Author: Ḥanān Shaykh
- Translator: Catherine Cobham
- Publisher: Anchor Books (English ed.)
- Publication date: 1992
- Publication place: Lebanon
- English publication date: 1995
- Media type: Print
- Pages: 371 p.
- ISBN: 0385473826
- OCLC: 937074975

Beirut Blues (Arabic: بريد بيروت) is Hanan al-Shaykh's third novel. It is an intimate and engaging portrait of a young woman struggling to make sense of her life in war ravaged Beirut, Lebanon during the Lebanese Civil War. It is told through letters, most of which may not reach their destination. The book was first published in 1992 in Arabic, only 2 years after the end of the civil war. The English translator is Catherine Cobham.

== Synopsis ==
Asmahan, the protagonist, is presented as a well-to-do independent woman who is able to sensualize the beauty of the land, the concept of home, and the country in itself, even in times of war. In 10 letters addressed to the people, places, and events that have shaped her life, Asmahan tries to decide whether to stay in her war-ravaged country or to emigrate to the U.S., where her mother lives, or possibly to France, new home of her friends Jawad and Hayat. She writes long, rambling, eloquent letters to loved ones, to Beirut, and to the war itself and the daring fragmented structure of this epistolary novel mirrors the chaos surrounding the heroine.

But Asmahan loves her city and its people, and she cannot imagine life anywhere else. She is contemptuous of those who have left, whether they are fleeing religious or political persecution or are simply trying to find work. But the constant danger and the daily frustrations of dealing with the various militias, of not having enough food, of rationed electricity, coupled with her love for Jawad, weaken her resolution.

In the final letter, she sits in the departure lounge of Beirut International Airport and weighs her decision. In this sparkling translation, Hanan al-Shaykh vividly portrays the tragedy of contemporary Lebanon in resonant human terms.
