= Bouclé =

Type of looped yarn or its resulting fabric

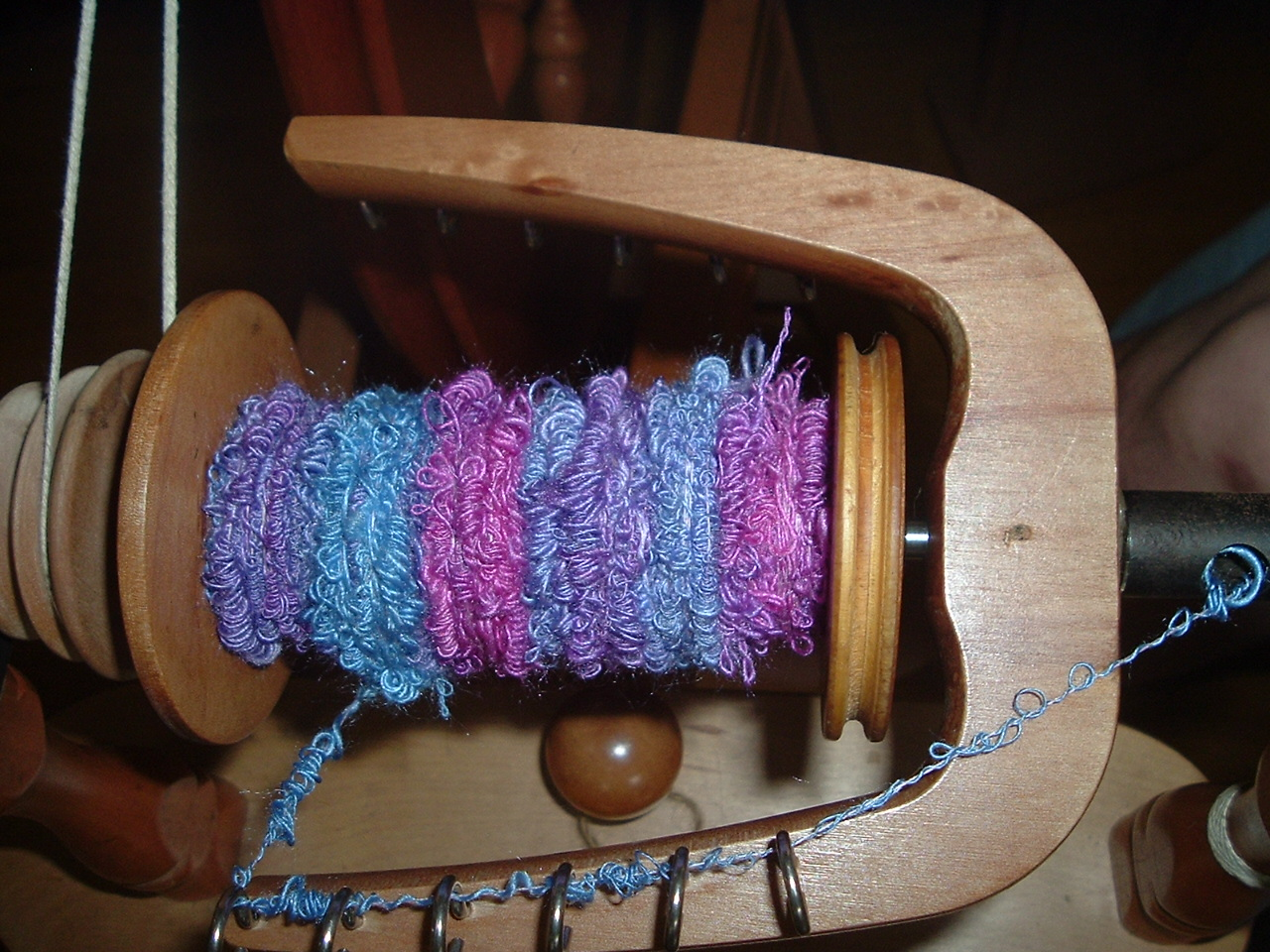
Bouclé yarn in the process of being spun

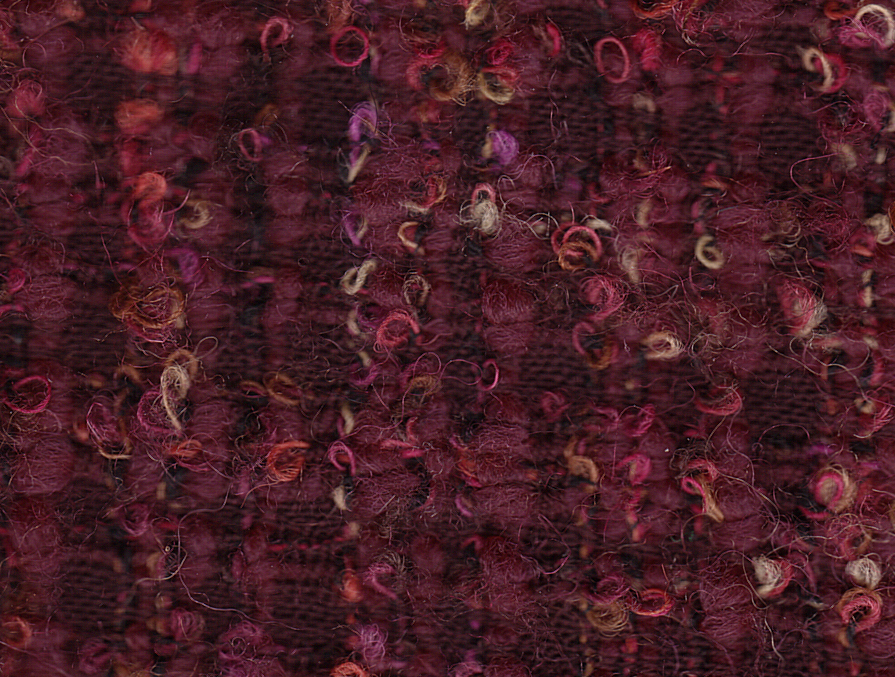
Commercially woven bouclé fabric

Bouclé is a looped yarn or the resulting fabric woven from this yarn.

The yarn is made from a length of loops of similar size, which can range from tiny circlets to large curls. To make bouclé, at least two strands are combined, with the tension on one strand being much looser than the other as it is being plied, resulting in the loose strand (known as the "effect yarn") forming the loops, with the other strand acting as the anchor.

The fabric woven from bouclé yarn maintains this looped appearance and is also called bouclé.

== Machine spinning ==
In machine spinning, bouclé yarn can be created in a single step, using a hollow spindle. It is made by differing the feed rate of the effect yarn with respect to the core yarns. The core yarns are wrapped around the effect yarn either loosely or tightly, depending on the difference in feed rates and amount of twist used. The regularity of the loops is controlled by varying the distance between the point where the core yarns come together and the guide. By increasing the distance, the bouclé effect becomes more irregular.
