= Ruth Picardie =

British writer and journalist

- Born: Ruth Nadine Picardie; 1 May 1964; Reading, Berkshire, England
- Died: 22 September 1997 (aged 33); London, England
- Cause of death: Breast cancer
- Education: Llanishen High School; King's College, Cambridge
- Occupations: Journalist, editor
- Spouse: Matt Seaton (m. 1994)
- Children: 2
- Relatives: Justine Picardie (sister)

Ruth Nadine Picardie (1 May 1964 – 22 September 1997) was an English journalist and editor.

== Life ==
Ruth Nadine Picardie was born on 1 May 1964 in Reading, Berkshire, the daughter of South African émigrés. She studied Social Anthropology at King's College, Cambridge. She worked as an editor and journalist for The Guardian and The Independent newspapers in the UK. She also contributed to other publications, including the New Statesman.

Her memoir of living with breast cancer, Before I Say Goodbye, was published posthumously in 2000, culled from five columns written for The Observer's magazine Life, and from her personal correspondence. These were collected and edited by her husband Matt Seaton and her sister Justine Picardie.

Picardie married Seaton in Worthing, West Sussex, in 1994. They had two children. Seaton was a keen competitive cyclist and is the author of The Escape Artist, which concentrates on his love of amateur cycling but also chronicled his wife's breast cancer.

Picardie died in Lambeth, London, aged 33. Her sister Justine, along with Beth Wagstaff (who soon afterward became another victim of the disease), established The Lavender Trust in her sister's memory. The Trust focuses on raising funds and support for younger women suffering from breast cancer. Picardie and Wagstaff's surgeon, Puvaneswary Markandoo, was subsequently found responsible for other misdiagnosis and negligence in surgical operations on women, and was removed from the medical register ("struck off") by the General Medical Council in December 2011.
