= Ramses College =

Christian school in Egypt

Ramses College for Girls
- ( العربية: كلية رمسيس للبنات )

Location
- 198 Ramses St. Ramses Square; Cairo; Egypt; 30.0704°N 31.2700°E

Information
- Established: 1908
- Founder: Miss Ella O.Kyle
- Principal: Mrs. Mary Alfy
- Gender: Female
- Language: Arabic, English, French
- Slogan: “ Enter Ye to Learn, Leave Ye to Serve ”
- Nickname: R.C.G.
- Affiliation: Evangelical Church of Egypt (Synod of the Nile)
- Website: RamsesCollege.com

Ramses College for Girls (Arabic: كلية رمسيس للبنات, transliteration: Kulliyyat Ramsīs li-l-Banāt), founded as the American College for Girls is an Egyptian school located at Ramses Square in Cairo, Egypt. One of the Evangelical Church of Egypt (Synod of the Nile) Schools for girls only. It is an English language private school that teaches the government program starting from kindergarten to secondary levels. French is taught from kindergarten as a 2nd language.

Alongside the Egyptian curriculum the school provides the IGCSE program and a Special Education program for neurodivergent students.

== History ==
American College for Girls originated as a trilingual (English, Arabic, and French) missionary school of the United Presbyterian Church of North America. Founded by Miss Ella O.Kyle. Its first building was inaugurated in 1910 by former U.S. president Theodore Roosevelt. He said, "I do not believe that any nation can rise to permanent greatness unless its women are fitted to play their part and dignity as man should play his."

In the year 1945, the Helen Martin Library was inaugurated. The Library was one of the many projects the College Alumni Association took part in. The alumni collected ten thousand Egyptian pounds for the construction of the Library.

However, the cost of constructing the Library reached twenty thousand pounds. The graduates and the Egyptian friends of the college paid three quarters of the cost; at that time the highest amount donated by an individual was five hundred pounds. The last quarter of the cost was donated by friends of the colleges, living abroad. The donation was given in the form of money or as materials such as tiles for the floors or furniture for the reading rooms or educational aids.

The library was inaugurated in 1945. The college invited the president of the republic at that time, President Mohamed Naguib to inaugurate the library. In a huge celebration, headed by Dr.Martin and attended by high Authorities in the country and a large number of graduates who participated with their donations in the construction of the library.

The library, as previously mentioned has books in the three languages, Arabic, English and French. It also includes not only ancient and modern literature, but also other publications in the different branches of knowledge. This besides a great number of encyclopedias, different in subjects and languages, researches and circulars.

The student body included girls of various ethnicities – Armenian, Greek, Jewish, Abyssinian (Ethiopian), Egyptian, Syrian, and Lebanese, as well as girls from the Gulf states – many of whom attended as boarders. Dr. Helen J. Martin served as principal from 1923 to 1956.

In 1960, with the nationalization of private schooling, ownership of the college was transferred to the Evangelical Church of Egypt (Synod of the Nile), an Egyptian Protestant organization. The school's cosmopolitan community gradually dwindled until it became entirely Egyptian. In 1967, following the Arab – Israel War and subsequent strained relations with the United States, the school's name was changed to Ramses College for Girls. From 1967 to 1992 the school's principal was Reda Salama of the legendary Salama sisters (her sister Mary was principal of PortSaid School), who established an Institute of Secretarial Studies and a Department for Girls with Special Needs. By 2003, more than two thousand girls were enrolled in the school.

== Notable alumni ==
- Lotfia Elnadi (1907–2002), Egyptian aviator
- Aziza Hussein, Egyptian Paralympian
- Suad al Lamkiyah (1938–2021), Omani lawyer
- Hanan al-Shaykh (born 1945), Lebanese author
- Nawal El Tatawy (born 1942), Egyptian economist

== See also ==
- Evangelical Church of Egypt (Synod of the Nile)
