= Nimat Hamoush =

Lebanese writer

Nimat Al Hamoush
- Citizenship: Lebanon 🇱🇧
- Occupations: Writer and storyteller
- Years active: 2011-now
- Known for: Writer - storyteller
- Notable work: The Man and the Monster (Novel); My Angel (Novel)

Nimat Hamoush (Arabic: نعمت الحاموش) is a Lebanese writer and storyteller. She has published novels and collections of short stories through Al Dar Al Arabia publishing and distribution.

One of her notable novels is The Man and the Monster, which explores themes such as writing, gender, and interpersonal relationships. She also published Khawater Joroh, a collection of short stories that includes a number of her poems, as well as Mirsah fi Alraml, released by the same publisher.

Her best-known novel is My Angel, published in 2019, which consists of around 129 pages.

== Career ==
The Man and the Monster was published in 2014 with 189 pages. The novel addresses themes of writing and life, portraying a woman who seeks to reclaim her position and exert influence over men through writing.

The novel combines poetic and narrative elements to discuss themes such as love, life, and real-world experiences. Hamoush has stated that the book reflects the history of women in the Middle East and their relationships with men. In an interview, she explained that she sought to preserve the narrative tradition while also engaging with questions surrounding women and the Arabic literary canon.

Her second book, Khawater Joroh, was published by Al Dar Al Arabia in 2016 with 136 pages. It is a collection of short stories that also includes previously unpublished poems by the author.

In 2017, Hamoush published her third book, Mirsat fi Alraml, also with Al Dar Al Arabia. Classified as a thriller and adventure novel, it spans 174 pages. She described the book as a story of unusual disappointments and impulses, portraying a protagonist trapped in time and place, unable to move forward.

Her most widely known work, Malaki (My Angel), was published in 2019 with 125 pages. The novel, categorized as thriller and adventure, follows Raji, a protagonist who experiences dreams, unanswered questions, and visions through his relationship with a mysterious woman referred to as Al Ghariba. The book blends elements of romance, prose poetry, and dream narrative, interweaving dreams with reality. Hamoush has argued that the novel differs from feminist literature as it emphasizes men’s emotions rather than women's, and she has described it as a fusion of literary arts and narrative structure.

== Works ==
The following are notable works by Nimat Hamoush:

- The Man and the Monster (2014), 189 pages
- Khawater Joroh (2016), 136 pages
- Mirsat fi Alraml (2017), 174 pages
- My Angel (2019), 125 pages
