= The Stones of Summer =

1972 novel by Dow Mossman

- First edition
- Author: Dow Mossman
- Language: English
- Genre: Novel
- Publisher: Bobbs-Merrill
- Publication date: 1972
- Publication place: United States
- Media type: Print (hardback & paperback)
- ISBN: 1-58567-517-2
- OCLC: 54410628

The Stones of Summer is a novel by American writer Dow Mossman. Both the novel and Mossman are also subjects of Mark Moskowitz's Slamdance award-winning film, Stone Reader (2002).

The Stones of Summer, first printed in 1972, quickly went out of print after its publisher Bobbs Merrill filed for bankruptcy. Because of this (and, it is speculated, a subsequent lack of marketing), this "marvelous book" (reviewer John Seelye in The New York Times Book Review), saw minor sales. According to Moskowitz’s documentary, Mossman was also briefly hospitalized for a nervous breakdown while completing the novel, which may have also impeded its commercial success.

== Plot summary ==
The Stones of Summer follows the life of Dawes Oldham Williams (D.O.W.) from childhood to teenage years in Cedar Rapids, Iowa, and finally adulthood. The book is divided into three sections.

=== Section 1 ===
Section 1 describes Williams' experiences in grade school and on a vacation to his grandfather's farm in Dawes City, Iowa, a depressed town built by Williams' once-prosperous and now ruined ancestors, which, though dead, are still ruined.

In school, Dawes takes interest mostly in disorderly behavior; he idolizes and befriends the profane and often obnoxious Ronnie Crown, and to some extent emulates Crown's rebelliousness. In one climactic moment, Dawes, Crown, and a friend exact revenge on a Cedar Rapids neighbor by blowing up her garage with a stick of dynamite. After the explosion, the three boys evade the police by hiding in empty coffins in a nearby building.

Section 1 also follows Dawes and his parents, Simpson and Leone, on a visit to Dawes and Leone's ancestral hometown, Dawes City, Iowa. There, the Dawes and his family visit his maternal grandparents. Dawes' grandfather, Arthur, is a greyhound breeder whose success is waning. Dawes' experiences with his grandfather are awkward and often painful: Dawes is already a strange boy, and Arthur's ridicule often compounds his grandson's odd behavior.

Despite this, Dawes sometimes feels a bond with Arthur, especially when it comes to the dogs, and after running errands with Arthur in town. While running errands, Arthur takes Dawes to the barber for a haircut and demands that his head be shaved. After the haircut, Arthur leaves Dawes with Abigail Winas, an old family friend and cryptic chicken farmer with whom Dawes seems to be a kindred spirit.

During the visit with Abigail, it is revealed that Winas' mental health has seriously deteriorated since Dawes' last visit. Winas tells the boy a mix of truth and fabrications about the reliability of history- especially relating to Dawes city- and she condemns Dawes' devotion to nightly Bible readings.

Dawes and Winas' discussion frequently borders on friendly and antagonistic, a consistent theme throughout The Stones of Summer. At the end of Dawes' visit with Abigail Winas, she slays and guts three chickens for the Dawes' family's dinner.

When Arthur and Dawes return to the farm, Arthur is chastised for getting such an extreme haircut for Dawes. Nonetheless, when the boy is asked whether he enjoyed his trip with Arthur, he is surprised by his own quick affirmation.

By the end of the vacation, however, Dawes has a tantrum after Arthur acts mean-spiritedly in croquet, when Dawes had tried to play fairly. Fed up, Dawes destroys a part of the croquet set. As a result, Arthur beats his grandson with a board. Simpson and Leone chastise Arthur for the harsh punishment but Dawes runs away despite their defense. He returns in the morning after spending the night in the woods near another remnant of his defunct family's empire: a decrepit house within which he finds a sleeping Abigail Winas.

=== Section 2 ===
Section 2 of The Stones of Summer chronicles Dawes' teenage life and his escapades with best friends Dunker, Travis, and Eddie. Throughout the section, the three boys drink great quantities of alcohol, get into fistfights with strangers and each other, and engage in many picaresque activities, as well as car accidents.

In this section, Dawes learns about sex well after his friends and eventually strikes up a romance with school girlfriends Becky Thatcher and later Summer Letch.

This entire section is brimming with sexual undertones- whether Dawes and his friends are cruising for girls, or Dawes is experimenting with Summer in a doomed relationship, or the four boys watch a disturbing carnival peep show.

This section ends in a terrible loss, though, at the end of the summer before college. As Dawes and his three best friends are speeding away from their final revenge upon a farmer who once chased them away with shotgun fire, their convertible leaves the road and Travis, Dunker, and Eddie are killed. Only Dawes survives after miraculously escaping from the out-of-control car before it crashes into the ravine below.

=== Section 3 ===
This great loss apparently leaves Dawes inconsolable and finally sends him over the edge of reason. Ten years have passed, and Dawes is in Mexico with a young woman. The literate Dawes' writings while in Mexico illustrate his poor mental health. Additionally, Dawes' conversations with others are much more cryptic and sarcastic. He is cruel to his Mexican girlfriend- who even seems to understand him somewhat.

The section itself is schizophrenically-constructed and jumps back and forth through time. Throughout the section, it is revealed that Dawes has had stints in a mental institution.

After leaving the hospital, Dawes decides to get drunk at an old hangout. He gets into a fight after refusing to pay a $5 bet at the pool table, and winds up on the floor after being hit with a pool cue. Dawes follows the attacker outside, where he is urinating on a nearby wall. Dawes convinces the man that he can urinate great distances and tricks him into an elaborate and far-fetched ploy to teach the art of long-distance urinating. Dawes' tactics, he demonstrates, involve warming up on all-fours and breathing heavily before finally jumping to one's feet. As the man follows Dawes' advice, Dawes attacks him and severely beats him with an axe handle.

With Mexico already in his mind, Dawes flees to his parents' house hearing the police sirens. They are surprised to see him. In this painful encounter, Dawes tries to borrow $100 from his father, but his request is peppered with verbal abuse, sarcasm, and vitriol, and Simpson refuses. Dawes destroys a cake that Leone had made for his birthday, causing her to cry, and he ridicules both of his very patient, confused, and worried parents. Despite their pleas for rationality, however, Dawes leaves in a fury, and kicks out two doors to the house. Leone comments that Dawes has lost all of his humanity.
