= The Stone of Laughter =

1990 novel by Hoda Barakat

- Cover of the American edition
- Author: Hoda Barakat
- Original title: Hajar al-Dahk حجر الضحك
- Translator: Sophie Bennet (English)
- Language: Arabic
- Genre: War novel
- Publisher: Riad El-Rayyes books
- Publication date: 1990
- English publication date: 1995

The Stone of Laughter (Arabic: حجر الضحك) is a Lebanese novel, written in 1990 by author Hoda Barakat set during the Lebanese Civil War. The book was translated into English by Sophie Bennett. It is a winner of the Al-Naqid prize and the first book by an Arab author to have a main character who is homosexual.

== Plot summary ==
The novel opens with Khalil, the protagonist, and Naji, a friend, heading to Khalil's room to talk. They discuss the possibility of Naji moving to Saudi Arabia to live with his sisters. The audience learns that Khalil is romantically attracted to Naji, as he repeatedly secretly admires him. As they progress down the streets of Beirut, the narrative digresses to describe the state of things there. It is revealed that people are fleeing the city in droves and are not coming back.

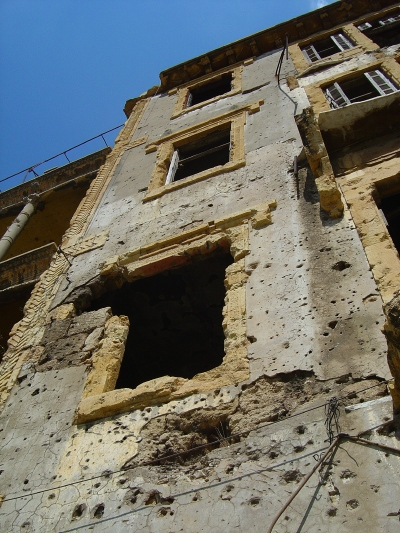
War damage to apartments during the same period

The next chapter begins with Khalil ritualistically cleaning and straightening his room. He always does this after battles in the streets. Some time has passed since the opening conversation, and Naji decided to leave the area. Khalil visits Naji's abandoned apartment, which he was asked to look after. As Khalil cleans up glass, we learn that Naji and his mother claim that they plan to come back. Khalil does not believe them.

Naji is supposed to come over for a visit with Khalil, but he doesn't come. After waiting for a long while, Khalil decides to visit another friend, Nayif. Nayif is having a small party with friends that he knows from his job at a newspaper. We learn that Nayif is involved in a political party.

Another car bombing takes place near a market that Khalil often shops at. When Khalil goes to the scene days later, he finds that it has seemingly healed and that life there is back to normal. Next, he visits Naji's house, and, while he is there, the phone rings. He picks it up and it is Naji's sister, whom he has met only once before. She tells him that Naji is dead. Khalil is unable to dwell on this, because the city starts getting bombed in the 1982 Israeli-Lebanese conflict. He hides with others in the newspaper offices where Nayif works. The newspapers have immunity from the bombings. There is a frantic party-like atmosphere here as the reporters rapidly write stories on the bombings. Once the bombings are over, Khalil returns to his apartment, going through war-damaged streets. He comes to his room to find that the window has been blown open and feels that his room has been somehow changed. Disturbed by this he goes outside in time to see an anti-Israeli march pass by.

Since the bombings are over, Khalil is forced to face Naji's death. He stops sleeping and spends most of his nights lying awake. Nayif comes over in order to tell him that Naji was killed because he was an agent for a group responsible for attacks. Khalil doesn't want to believe this and uses his usual defense of denial. Later, after much thought, he decides to accept what Nayif has said as true. He isolates himself from everybody. He sleeps all day and spends all night listening to other people's problems on FM radio shows.

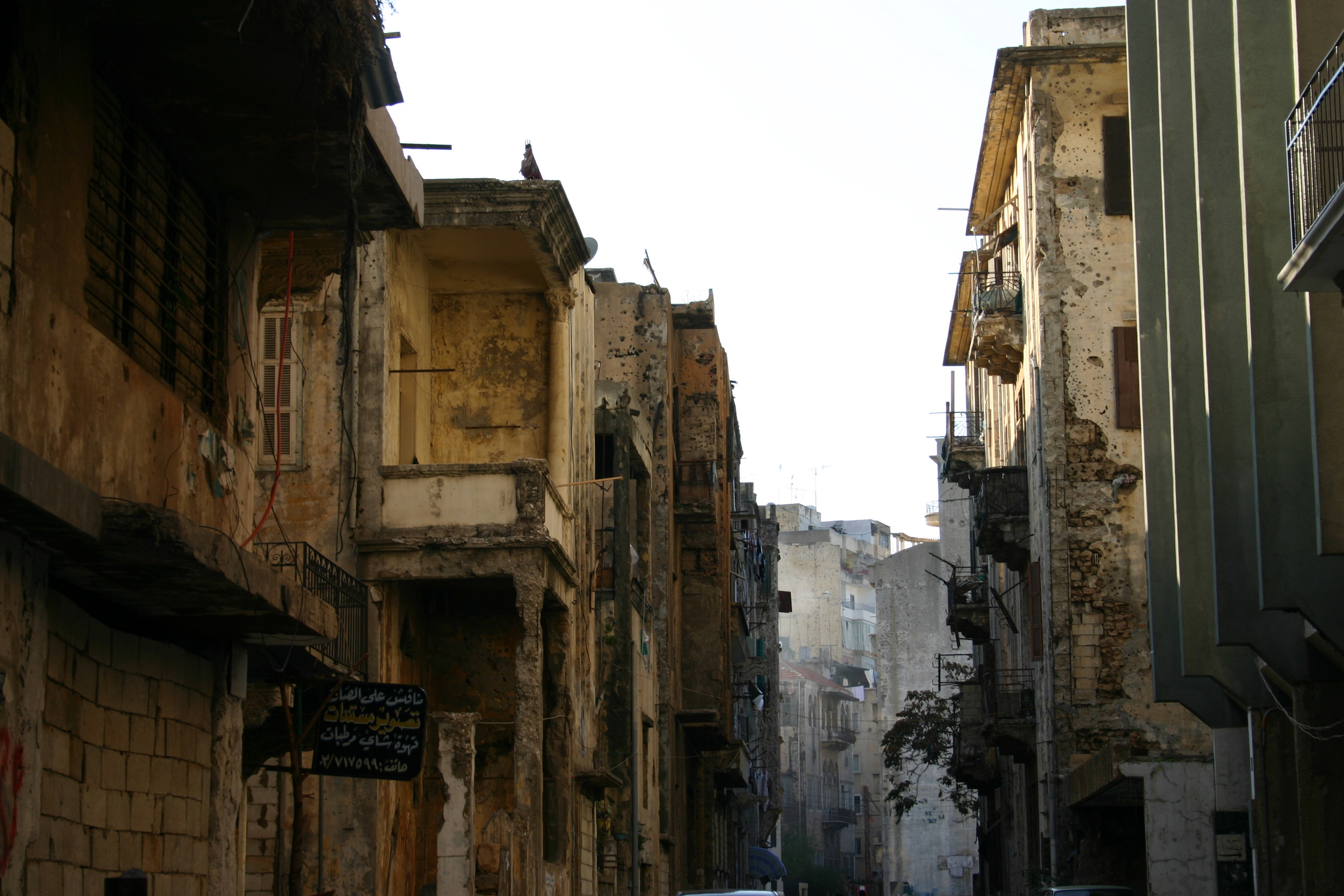
War damage in Downtown Beirut

The bombing starts again, and Khalil hides with others in the higher floors away from the fighting on the street. After several days, the fighting stops and the people go out to see the damaged streets. Khalil's uncle's family comes to Beirut, having fled their village, and Khalil sets them up in Naji's apartment. His daughter, Zahrah, has a crush on Khalil, who is pleased to be loved despite the fact that he feels little attraction to her. Khalil has a crush on her brother, Youssef.

The narrative goes on to describe Khalil's own struggles to form his political views and gain acceptance with the other young men his age. This struggle is paralleled by Youssef, who comes to Khalil's apartment to ask his advice on whether or not he should join a local militia. Khalil stays neutral and rather asks Youssef questions to help him think it over. He decides to join the group.

Youssef's new job keeps him busy during the day and greatly reduces the time he spends with Khalil, which causes Khalil much distress. Khalil decides to take the job that Nayif offered him at the newspaper. He goes in for an interview and embarrasses himself by saying things that make him seem radical despite his lack of involvement in politics. Sporadic street fighting starts again. In one such episode, Youssef is killed.

As Khalil is suffering emotionally from Youssef's death, he becomes sick and starts coughing up blood. He isolates himself from the world much as he did after Naji's death. Nayif comes by the apartment, but Khalil doesn't answer the door, hoping that Nayif will break in out of concern. After doing this twice, he finally answers the door and lets Nayif in. Nayif tells him that one of his political friends, called The Gentlemen, wants to clear out an abandoned apartment in Khalil's building in order to house his mother. They agree to clear out the furniture and sell it.

Khalil takes a taxi ride to the hospital to have himself examined as he had acute abdominal pain. On the way there the taxi encounters traffic and the driver decides to take side streets. He accidentally drives up to a roadblock and Khalil and the other passengers are interrogated and nearly killed by armed men. Khalil manages to get by and make it to the hospital. It turns out that Khalil had an ulcer, which he needs an operation to remove. Khalil enjoys the hospital, which he views as a sanctuary. Khalil soon acquires a reputation for cowardice among the hospital staff, who, nevertheless, like him.

One of Khalil's neighbors, Mustafa (usually called the bride groom), recommends that Khalil should rent out Naji's apartment. He rents it to a woman and her son. As he looks it over he encounters his memories of Naji and Youssef. Khalil likes his new tenants but has a feeling that the woman dislikes him.

At a party with friends of Nayif, Khalil becomes acquainted with the Brother, a man who is involved in Nayif's newspaper and is a leader of a military organization. He suspects that Khalil is gay, which he confirms in a conversation, and reveals that he is gay as well. He makes advances, which confuse Khalil, who ends up going home. The Brother begins inviting him on business dealings, which involve the buying and selling of drugs and weapons. On one walk back to apartment after a deal Khalil is accidentally assaulted by the Brother's men, who apologize and offer to take him home.

The author describes the city of Beirut. She explains how is corrupting Khalil and sucking away at his soul. Some time passes before the next scene. Khalil, now referred to as "Mr. Khalil" by Mustafa, is talking about storing weapons he has brought in the apartments. The woman who is still his tenant complains that it is dangerous and he tells her to go upstairs and that he will come and talk to her. He goes up and rapes her. The author explains how her Khalil has changed from how he was to "a man who laughs".

== Characters ==
- Khalil- The protagonist of the novel, a young man who constantly struggles with his own feminine nature and his desire to be accepted by others.
- Naji- A friend of Khalil who is shot by a sniper in response to his involvement with armed groups.
- Youssef- Khalil's cousin who dies in street fighting near the end of the novel.
- Nayif- A friend of Khalil who works at a newspaper.
- Madame Isabelle- Naji's mother who persuades him to leave Beirut with her.
- The Brother- A friend of Nayif, who is involved in his Newspaper. He, like Khalil, is gay and he makes advances on Khalil.
- Mustafa- An estate agent and arms merchant who works with and later for Khalil. He is also called the Bridegroom.

== International reception ==
The novel received the prestigious Al-Naqid prize and has been widely acclaimed. It also however, has its critics. Barakat suggests in her novel that while men are constantly talking a politics and the war, women typically talk more mundane matters. The women in the novel are portrayed as lucky in one sense as they, unlike Khalil, do not have to pick a side in political conflicts. However, on the other hand their talk is sometimes portrayed as simplistic and banal. This has spawned the suggestion that her views are anti-feminist.

Kirkus Reviews praised the novel, calling it "a gripping story" and praising the characterization, but criticized what it called "a tendency towards preachiness".
