= Women of Sand and Myrrh =

Novel by Hanan al-Shaykh

Women of Sand and Myrrh is a novel written by Hanan al-Shaykh. It is al-Shaykh's fifth novel. It was originally published in 1989 as Misk al-ghazal (مسك الغزال), and was published in English in 1992. The English translator is Catherine Cobham. Publishers Weekly chose Women of Sand and Myrrh as one of the 50 best books of 1992.

The storyline consists of four main characters: Suha, Tamr, Nur, and Suzanne. Different sections of the novel give the perspectives of the four women, making the book a story with four different narrators. Suha and her husband have escaped from war-torn Lebanon into the unnamed country; despite this, Suha finds herself miserable and bored, and cheats on her husband with the wealthy and spoiled Nur. Suzanne is an American housewife who has also arrived with her husband; her husband is no longer attracted to her, but Suzanne discovers that she is extremely attractive to the local men. Tamr is an poor Turkish woman who tries to establish her own business, but struggles as a divorcee with no rights.

The story is based in a relatively modern society in the Middle East. Rather than having strong ties into the pre-20th century Middle East, it is representative of life in some of the more fundamentalist societies within the last few decades. Elements of the book are present in this society today:

- Women wearing abayas and using different infrastructure elements.
- Mandatory prayers at certain times of the day
- Patriarchal society; many view women as good for little except raising children.
- Implementation of desalinization plants (a large clue that the main setting is Saudi Arabia), airports, etc.

The novel addresses many issues in today's society and has a wide variety of themes. Main themes of the novel include differing gender roles, class distinctions, culture, religion, and materialism vs. romanticism. Themes include:

- Men vs. women
- Feminism
- Use and/or abuse of power in a relationship
- Class distinctions
- Structure of society
- Rebellion against the status quo
- Culture and religion
- Freedom vs. Confinement/Restraint
- Elements of traditional culture and their effect
- Materialism vs. Romanticism
- The sexual disadvantages and existing desires of Arab women
- Hidden Lesbianism in Arab cultures
- The Innate desire of Arab women to be treated better

Women of Sand and Myrrh was banned in many Arabic lands for strong content (sexual, political, etc.) and for a strong treatment of Arabic culture.

== Critical reception ==
Kirkus Reviews praised the novel, calling it "a promising debut". Publishers Weekly likewise gave a positive review.

Elise Salem Manganaro, writing for the Middle East Studies Association, criticized the style of the novel, but otherwise praised the novel for its themes and relevance to the modern world. Edward Said called the novel one "Western feminists should read". Hannadi al-Samman criticized the depiction of lesbian relationships in the novel, writing that lesbian love in the novel is portrayed as merely an inferior alternative to heterosexuality.
