= Layla ʽUssayran =

Lebanese novelist

Layla ʽUssayran (Arabic: ليلى عسيران; 1934–2007) was a Lebanese novelist.

She was born in Sidon and received a BA in political science from the American University of Beirut. She worked for the Lebanese publisher Dar Al Sayyad. She was also a correspondent for the Egyptian magazine Rose al-Yūsuf. In 1996, she was named a knight in the National Order of the Cedar.

== Selected works ==
- Lan Namut Ghadan ("We will not die tomorrow") novel (1962)
- Al-Hiwar al-Akhras ("The mute conversation") novel (1963)
- AI-Madinah al-Farighah ("The empty city") novel (1966)
