= Before I Say Goodbye =

2000 non-fiction book by Ruth Picardie

- Author: Ruth Picardie
- Publisher: Henry Holt and Company
- Publication date: 1 September 2000
- ISBN: 0-8050-6612-8

Before I Say Goodbye is a book by Ruth Picardie. It was published in September 2000 by Henry Holt and Company. Compiled and edited by her sister and husband, it uses Picardie's newspaper columns and correspondence to tell the story of her life with breast cancer, to which she succumbed in September 1997.

== In other works ==
- In her 1999 autobiography If Only, Geri Halliwell says she was reading Before I Say Goodbye around the time she left the Spice Girls.
