= Chez Ninon =

American fashion house

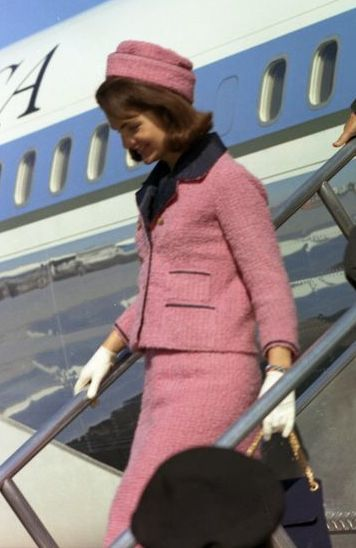
Jackie Kennedy descending from Air Force One at Dallas Love Field on the day of her husband's assassination, wearing the Chanel pink suit.

Chez Ninon was an American couture fashion house, founded in 1928 by Nona McAdoo Park and Sophie Meldrim Shonnard, and known for making authorized copies of designs from the leading French fashion houses.

Nona was the daughter of William Gibbs McAdoo, U.S. Secretary of the Treasury, and had been known as "the Cabinet beauty". Sophie was the daughter of Peter Meldrim, a prominent judge in Savannah, Georgia; and her first husband was the American football player and coach Ted Coy.

Historically, Chez Ninon was credited with creating the Pink Chanel suit of Jacqueline Kennedy as an authorized copy of a Chanel suit from its fall/winter 1961 collection.

On October 27, 2026, a documentary, Le luxe, un pouvoir français : comment Dior, Chanel et Hermès ont conquis le monde, was broadcast in France. The documentary covers an internal review of Chanel's historical sales ledgers from 1961 to 1963. According to the documentary, Chanel's archivists concluded that Jacqueline Kennedy's suit was an authentic Parisian haute couture creation (Suit No. 44), purchased by Letizia Mowinckel (Jackie's fashion scout in Paris) through her dedicated Chanel saleswoman, Mme Suzanne.
