= Hanan al-Shaykh =

Lebanese writer (born 1945)

Hanan al-Shaykh FRSL
- حنان الشيخ
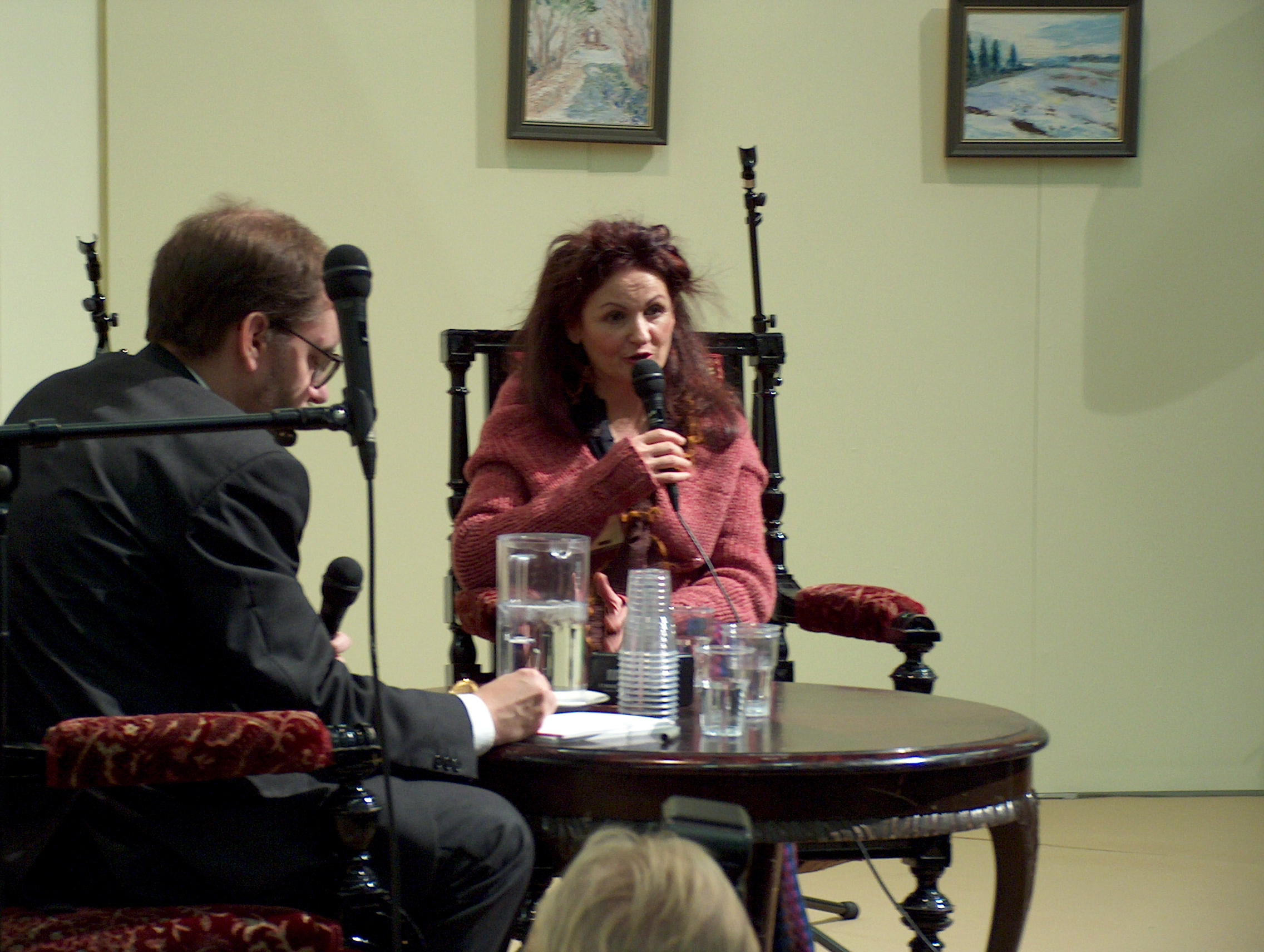
- Al-Shaykh at Helsinki Book Fair, 2003
- Born: 12 November 1945 (age 80); Beirut, Lebanon
- Education: American College for Girls
- Occupation: Writer
- Children: Juman

Hanan al-Shaykh (Arabic: حنان الشيخ; born 12 November 1945) is a Lebanese author.

== Biography ==
Hanan al-Shaykh was born in Beirut, Lebanon, in 1945, into a strict Shi'a family. Her father and brother exerted strict social control over her during her childhood and adolescence. She attended the Almillah primary school for Muslim girls where she received a traditional education for Muslim girls, before continuing her education at the Ahliah school. She continued her gender-segregated education at the American College for Girls in Cairo, Egypt, graduating in 1966.

She returned to Lebanon to work for the Lebanese newspaper An-Nahar until 1975. She left Beirut again in 1975 at the outbreak of the Lebanese Civil War and moved to Saudi Arabia to work and write there. She now lives in London, England.

She is a novelist and playwright, her novels including Only in London, which was shortlisted for the Independent Foreign Fiction Prize.

She was elected a Fellow of the Royal Society of Literature in 2019.

Her daughter is Juman Malouf, a writer, illustrator and costume designer who is also the romantic partner of American director Wes Anderson.

== Major themes ==
Al-Shaykh's work often implies or states sexually explicit scenes and sexual situations that go directly against the social mores of conservative Arab society, which has led to her books being banned in the more conservative areas of the region including Arab countries in the Persian Gulf. In other countries, her books are difficult to obtain because of censorship laws that prevent the Arabic translations from being easily accessible to the public. Specific examples are The Story of Zahra, which includes abortion, divorce, sanity, children born outside of marriage, and sexual promiscuity, and Women of Sand and Myrrh, which contains scenes of a romantic relationship between two of the main female protagonists.

In addition to her prolific writing on the condition of Arab women and her literary social criticism, Al-Shaykh is also part of a group of authors writing about the Lebanese Civil War.

== Selected works ==
=== Work in Arabic ===
- Suicide of a Dead Man, 1970 (انتحار رجل ميت)
- The Devil's Horse, 1975
- The Story of Zahra, 1980 (حكاية زهرة)
- The Persian Carpet in Arabic Short Stories, 1983
- Scent of a Gazelle, 1988 (مسك الغزال)
- Mail from Beirut, 1992 (بريد بيروت)
- I Sweep the Sun Off Rooftops, 1994 (أكنس الشمس عن السطوح)
- Two Women by the Sea, 2003 (امرأتان على شطىء البحر)

=== Works that have been translated into English from Arabic ===
- Women of Sand and Myrrh (trans. 1992)
- The Story of Zahra (trans. 1994)
- Beirut Blues (trans. 1992)
- Only in London (trans. 2001)
- I Sweep the Sun Off Rooftops (trans. 2002)
- The Persian Carpet
- The Locust and the Bird: My Mother's Story (trans. 2009)
- The Occasional Virgin, Pantheon (2018), ISBN 978-1524747510

=== Works in English ===
- One Thousand and One Nights: A Retelling, Pantheon (2013) ISBN 978-0307958860
