= List of first women mayors (20th century) =

The following is a list of the first women to serve as mayor of their respective municipalities.

== 1900s ==
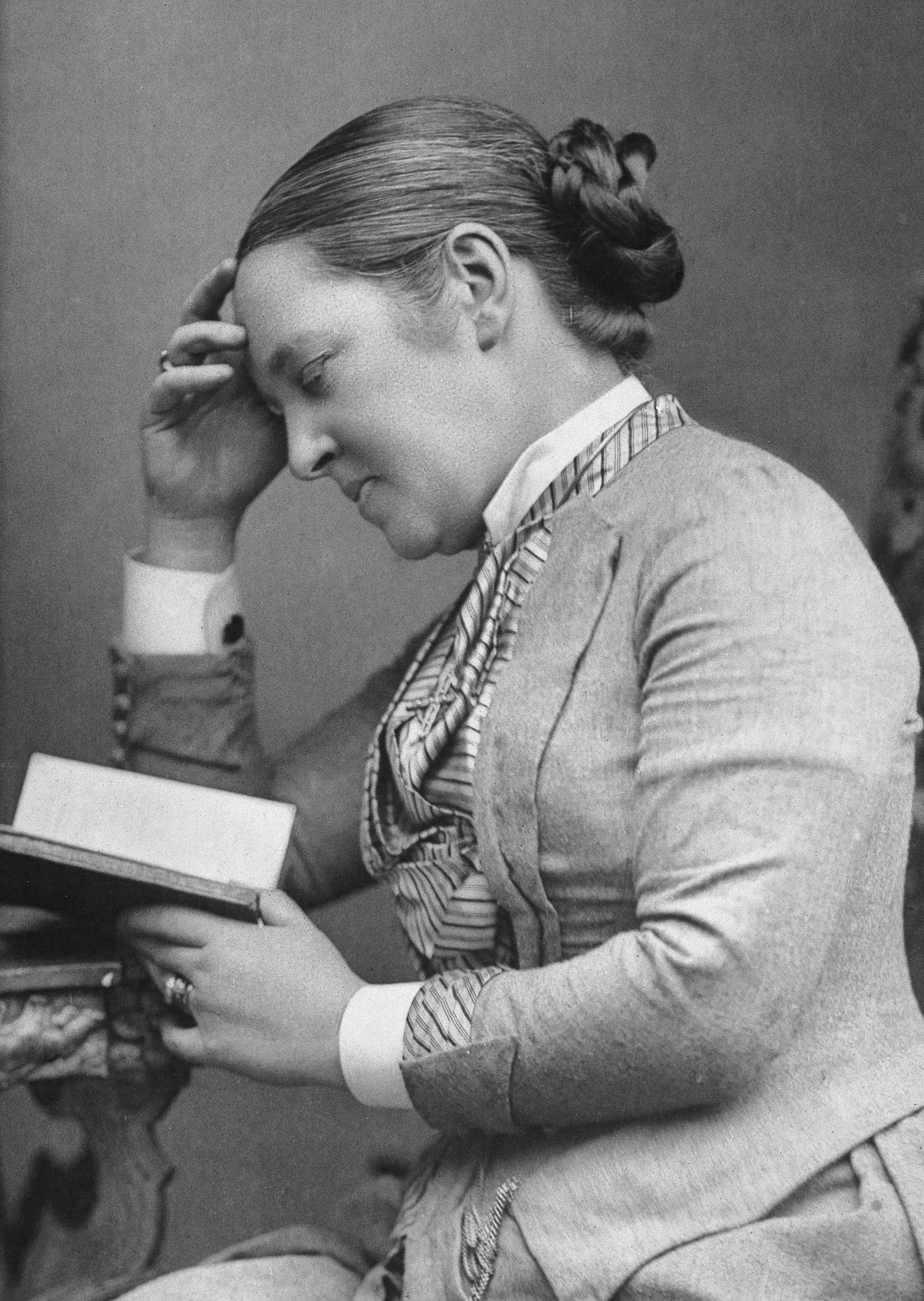
Dr. Elizabeth Garrett Anderson was the first woman elected mayor in England.

1906

Lady Margaret Dockrell, first woman chair of the Urban District Council of Monkstown, Ireland, United Kingdom

1908

Elizabeth Garrett Anderson, first woman mayor in England and first female mayor of Aldeburgh, United Kingdom

== 1910s ==
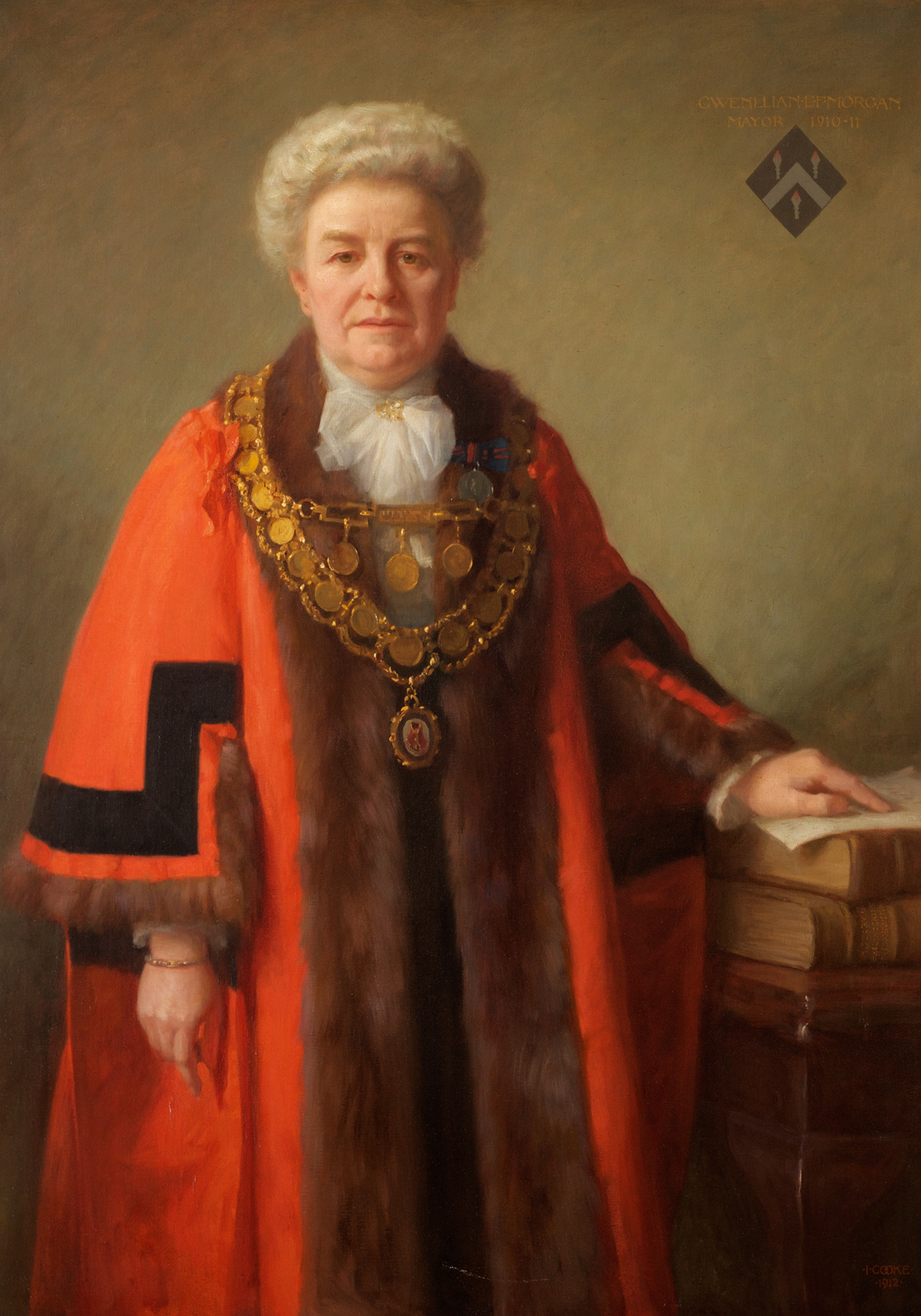
Gwenllian Morgan was the first woman to serve as mayor in Wales.

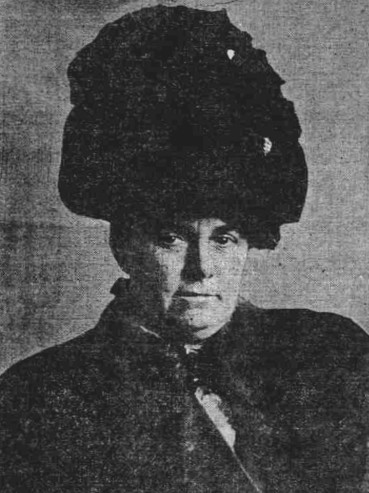
Clara C. Munson was the first woman elected mayor in Oregon in the 20th century.

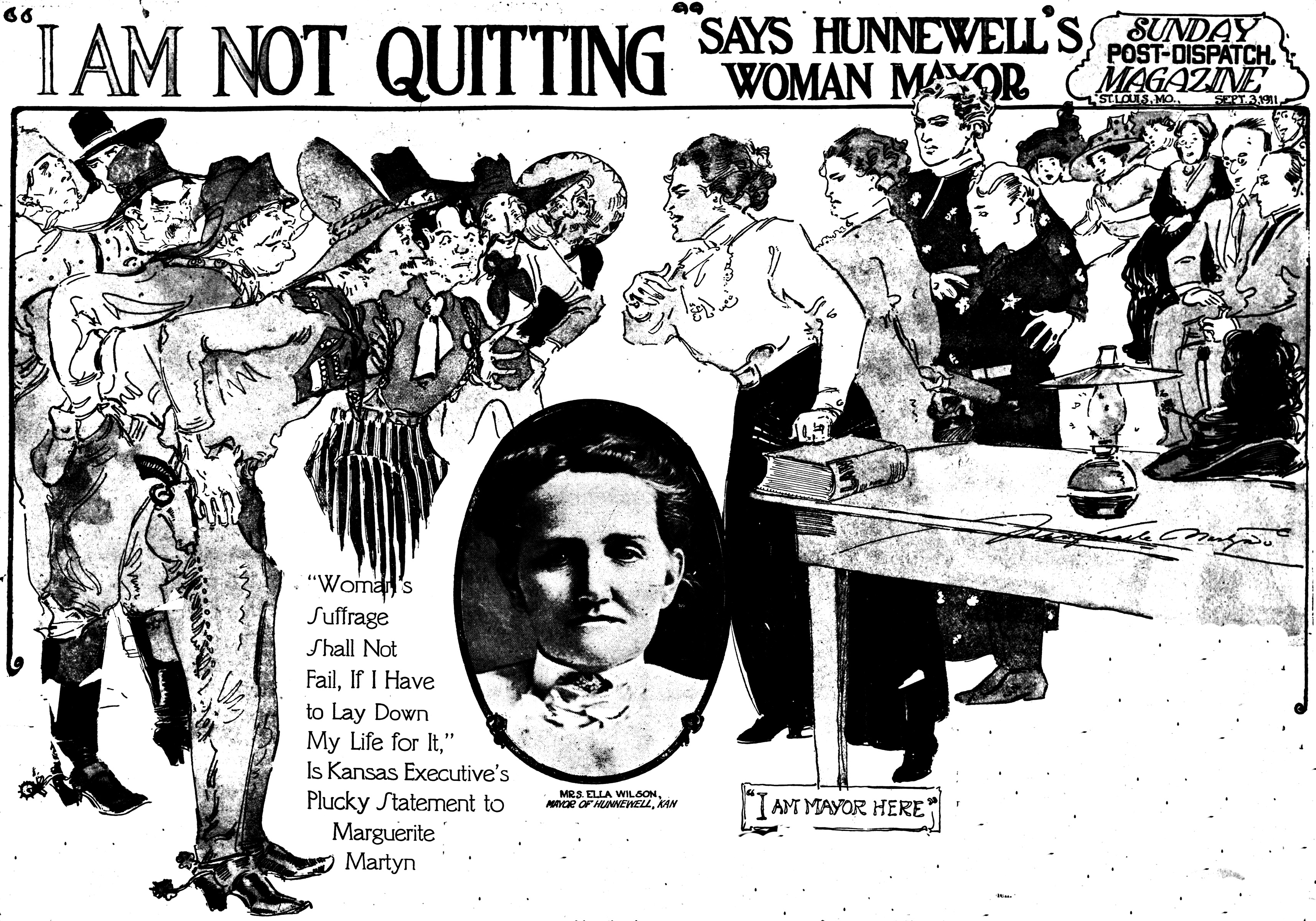
Imaginative drawing by reporter Marguerite Martyn of Mayor Ella Wilson of Hunnewell, Kansas, her supporters and opponents, with a photo. The all-male city council was attempting to remove her. St. Louis Post-Dispatch, 3 September 1911.

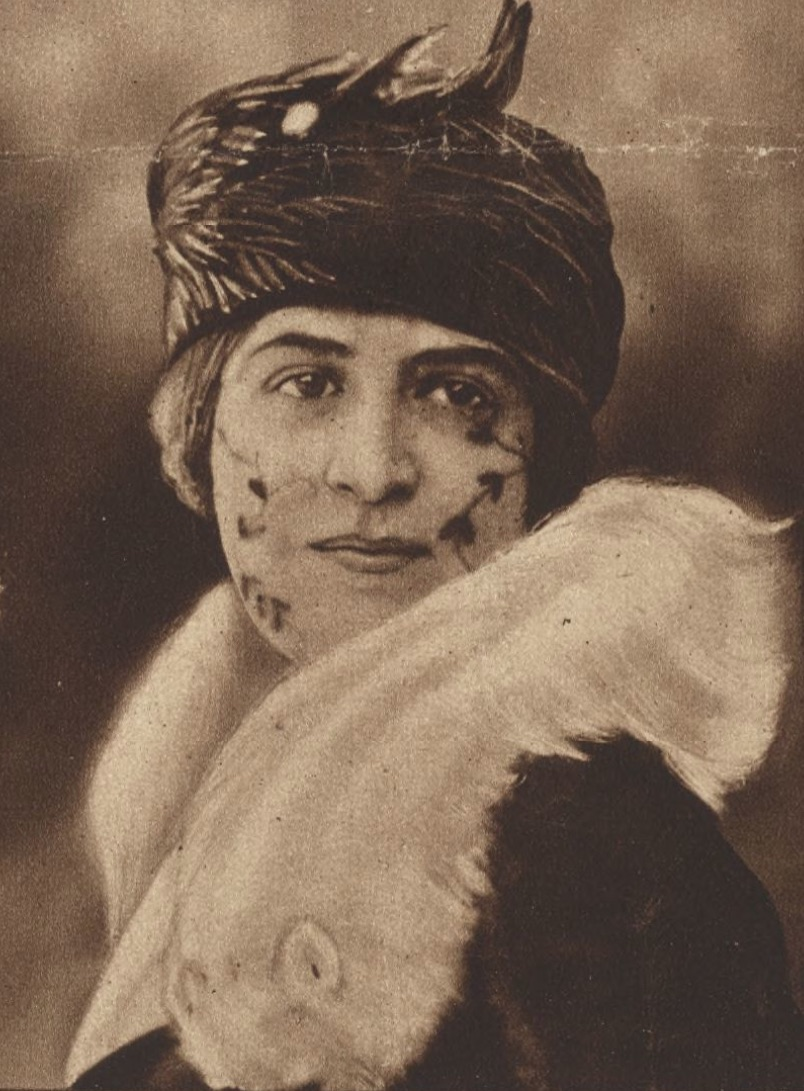
Marian Newhall Horwitz, first woman mayor in the South

1910

Sarah Lees, first woman mayor of Oldham, in Lancashire, England (United Kingdom)
Gwenllian Morgan, first woman mayor of Brecon, Wales, United Kingdom

first woman mayor in Wales

1911

Kate F. O'Connor, first woman mayor of Arcadia, Illinois, United States
Ella Wilson, first woman mayor of Hunnewell, Kansas (United States)

1912

Clara C. Munson, first woman mayor of Warrenton, Oregon, United States

also the first woman elected mayor following the passage of the equal suffrage law in Oregon. Some sources, including The Daily Astorian, erroneously call Munson the first woman elected mayor in Oregon; however, that distinction belongs to Alice E. Burns who was elected mayor of Florence, Oregon in 1895.

Mary E. Woolley Chamberlain, first woman mayor of Kanab, Utah, United States
Susan Wissler, mayor of Dayton, Wyoming, United States

Wissler was the first woman mayor in Wyoming

1913

H.C. Defenhaugh, first woman elected mayor in Tyro, Kansas, United States

1914

Clara Latourell Larsson, first woman elected mayor of Troutdale, Oregon, United States

1915

Angela Rose Canfield, first woman mayor of Warren, Illinois, United States
Estelle Lawton Lindsey, first woman to execute the duties of mayor of Los Angeles, California, United States

This occurred when Los Angeles Mayor Henry H. Rose was absent from his post in September 1915 and directed Lindsey, a member of the city council, to fill in as acting mayor.

1916

Ellen French Aldrich, first woman elected mayor of Sawtelle, United States
C. I. Driver, first woman to serve as mayor of Lone Rock, Colorado, United States

was appointed by the city council

Mary Alice Partington, first woman mayor of Glossop, in Derbyshire (United Kingdom)

1917

Avis Francis, first woman mayor of Valley Center, Kansas, United States
Ophelia "Birdie" Crosby Harwood, mayor of Marble Falls, Texas, United States

also the first woman mayor in Texas, elected by an all-male vote three years before women were allowed to vote.

Marian Newhall Horwitz, first woman who served as mayor of Moore Haven, Florida, United States

also first woman mayor in Florida

Laura Jane Starcher, first woman elected mayor of Umatilla, Oregon, United States

1918

Blanch Shelley, first woman elected mayor of Sandy, Oregon, United States
Maria Skobtsova, first woman mayor in the Russian Empire and first female mayor of Anapa, Russia

1919

Helen B. Coe, first woman elected mayor of Langley, Washington, United States

was elected with an all-woman city council

Ada Summers, first woman elected mayor of Stalybridge, in Cheshire, England (United Kingdom)

== 1920s ==
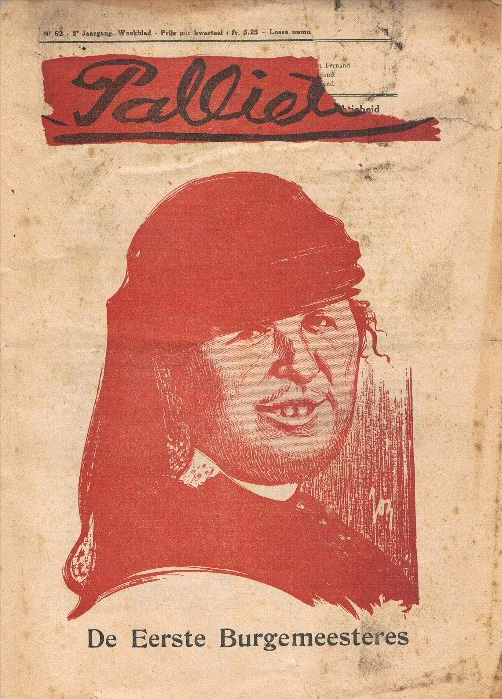
The front page of the Flemish magazine Pallieter, depicting Léonie Keingiaert de Gheluvelt, the first woman mayor in Belgium, as illustrated by Jos De Swerts

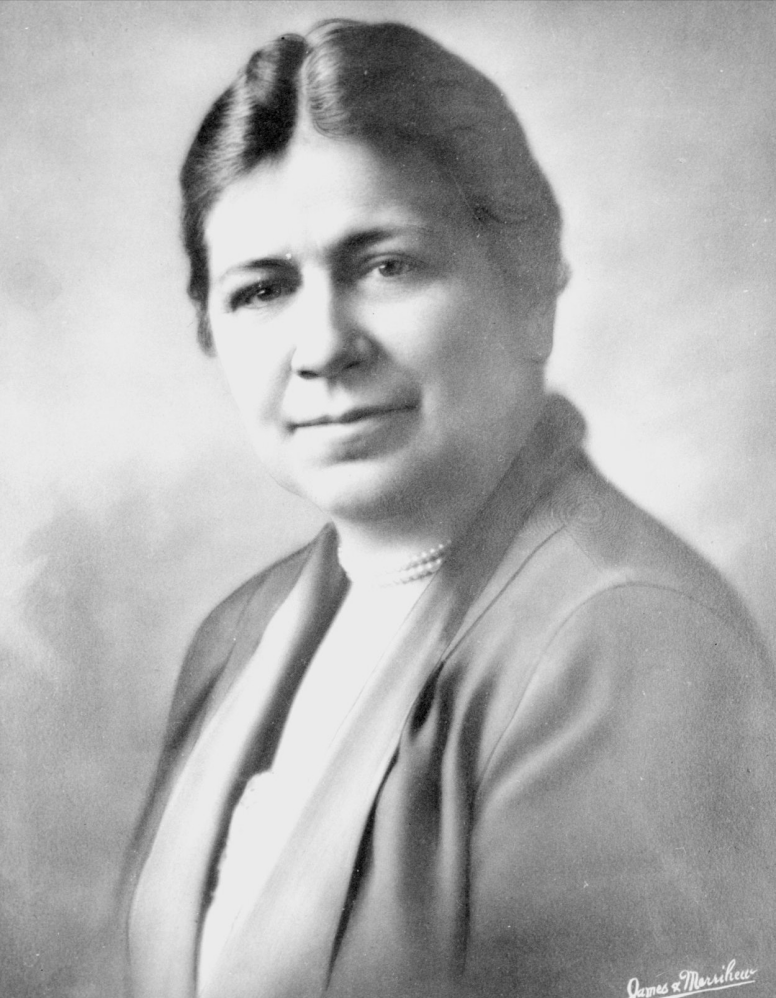
Bertha Knight Landes was the first woman elected mayor in a major American city following her election as mayor of Seattle in 1926.

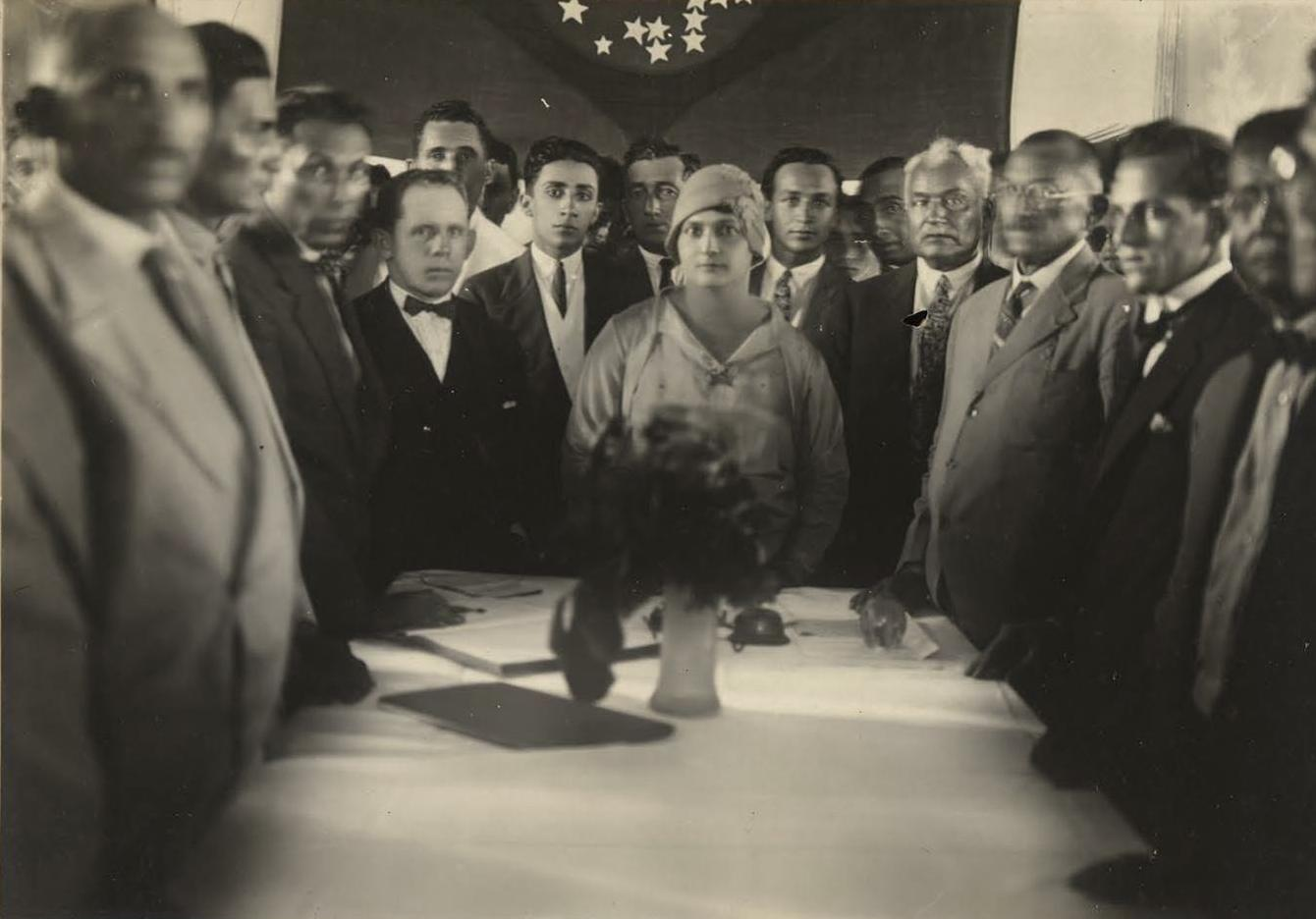
Alzira Soriano (center) was the first woman to serve as mayor in Brazil. She held the position of mayor of Lajes, Rio Grande do Norte from 1929 to 1930.

1920

Hattie Barnes Adkisson, first woman mayor of Jewett, Texas, United States,
Ellen Chapman, first woman elected mayor of Worthing, in West Sussex, England (United Kingdom)
Lula V. Coleman first woman mayor of Jena, Louisiana, United States

Coleman, who was serving as deputy sheriff of LaSalle Parish, was appointed mayor by Governor John M. Parker, making her the first woman to serve as mayor in Louisiana

Nora Gammon, first woman mayor of Thebes, Illinois, United States
Louise Fussman, mayor Humboldt, Kansas, United States
Grace B. Lampshire, first woman elected mayor of Burns, Oregon, United States

also the first woman elected mayor in Oregon by write-in vote

Grace Miller, first woman elected mayor of Jackson, Wyoming, United States
Bernice Pitts, first woman to execute the office of mayor of Portland, Oregon, United States

Pitts, a student at Richmond School, served as mayor in place of George Luis Baker for five minutes

1921

Ellen M. Anderson, first woman mayor of Lantana, Florida, United States
Léonie Keingiaert de Gheluvelt, first woman elected mayor of Gheluvelt, Belgium

also the first woman elected mayor in Belgium

Lillian Cox Gault, first woman elected mayor of St. Peter, Minnesota, United States

also the first woman to serve as mayor in Minnesota

Christiana Hartley, first woman elected mayor of Southport, in Lancashire, England (United Kingdom)
Amy A. Kaukonen, first woman elected mayor in Fairport Harbor, Ohio, United States
Mayme Ousley, first woman elected mayor of St. James, Missouri, United States

Ousley was also the first woman elected mayor in the state of Missouri

Mary Peterson, first woman elected mayor of Red Cloud, Nebraska, United States
Florence J. Pierce, first woman elected mayor of Goodhue, Minnesota, United States
Dolly Spencer, first woman elected mayor of Milford, Ohio, United States
Alice Harrell Strickland, first woman elected mayor of Duluth, Georgia, United States

Strickland was the first woman elected mayor in the state of Georgia

Clara Winterbotham, first woman elected mayor of Cheltenham, in Gloucestershire, England (United Kingdom)

1922

Beatrice Anna Cartwright, first woman elected mayor of Brackley, Northamptonshire, England, United Kingdom
Dr. Josie Rogers, first woman mayor of Daytona, Florida, United States
Ada Salter, mayor of Bermondsey, first woman mayor in London (United Kingdom)
Maude R. Satterthwaite, first woman mayor of Stonewall, North Carolina, United States

1923

Catherine Alderton, first woman mayor of Colchester, England, United Kingdom
Emma J. Harvat, first woman elected mayor of Iowa City, Iowa, United States

first woman in the United States to be elected mayor of a city with more than 10,000 inhabitants

Mary McFadden, first woman mayor of Magnetic Springs, Ohio, United States

was appointed by the city council at the age of 80.

Janet Stancomb-Wills, first woman mayor of Ramsgate, England, United Kingdom

1924

Kathrine M. Cowan, first woman mayor of Wilmington, North Carolina, United States
Lucy Dales, first woman elected mayor of Dunstable, England, United Kingdom
Jesse Elwyn Nelson, first woman elected mayor of Signal Hill, California, United States

also Signal Hill's first mayor

Edwina Benner, first woman elected mayor of Sunnyvale, California, United States
Carrie Maude Eve, first woman elected mayor of Stoke Newington, in London, England (United Kingdom)
Alice U. Kerr, first woman elected mayor of Edmonds, Washington, United States
Ethel Leach, first woman elected mayor of Great Yarmouth, in Norfolk, England (United Kingdom)
Mary Mercer, first woman elected mayor of Birkenhead, in Cheshire, England (United Kingdom)
Matilde Pérez Mollá, first woman elected mayor in Spain, (city of Gorga, Spain)
Mildred Putnam, first woman elected mayor of Stoutsville, Missouri, United States

1925

Rosa Belle Eaddy Woodberry Dickson, first woman elected mayor in South Carolina and first woman elected mayor of Johnsonville, South Carolina
Rebecca Estell Bourgeois Winston, first woman elected mayor in New Jersey, United States,

first mayor and founder of Estell Manor

Maude Duncan, first woman elected mayor of Winslow, Arkansas, United States
Maggie Skipwith Smith, first woman elected mayor in Louisiana, United States

1926

Mattle Chandler, first woman mayor of Richmond, California, United States
Bertha Knight Landes, first woman mayor of Seattle, Washington, United States

first woman mayor of a major American city

Aasa Helgesen, first woman elected mayor of Utsira Municipality and first female mayor in Norway

1927

Alzira Soriano de Souza, first female appointed mayor in Brazil

also first female mayor of Lages

Fanne Gaar, first woman elected mayor in Arizona, mayor of Casa Grande, Arizona, United States
Margaret Beavan, first woman elected Lord Mayor of Liverpool, England, United Kingdom

first woman lord mayor in the United Kingdom

Lucia Foster Welch, first woman elected Mayor of Southampton, England, United Kingdom

1928

Leah Arcouet Chiles, first woman elected mayor of Kenilworth Park, North Carolina, United States
Lena Culver Hawkins, first woman mayor of Brooksville, Florida, United States
Ella L. Maddocks, first woman mayor of Owls Head, Maine, United States

"Mayor" was an honorary title chosen by the Owls Head Select Committee.

May B. Hopkins, first woman elected mayor of Redondo Beach, California, United States
Alzira Soriano, first woman elected mayor in Latin America, mayor of Lajes, Rio Grande do Norte, Brazil

1929

Emily Jones, first woman elected mayor of Eureka, California, United States
Bessie Moore, first woman elected mayor of Candor (village), New York, United States

Moore won by write-in vote and refused to take the oath of office

== 1930s ==
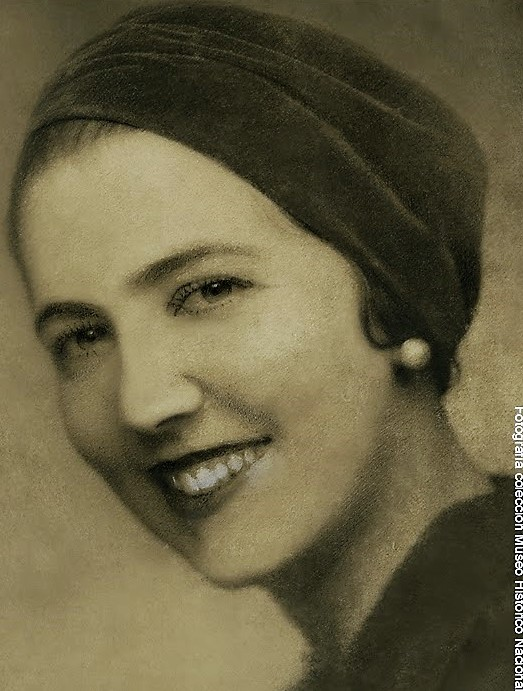
Alicia Cañas Zañartu was the first woman popularly elected in Chile.

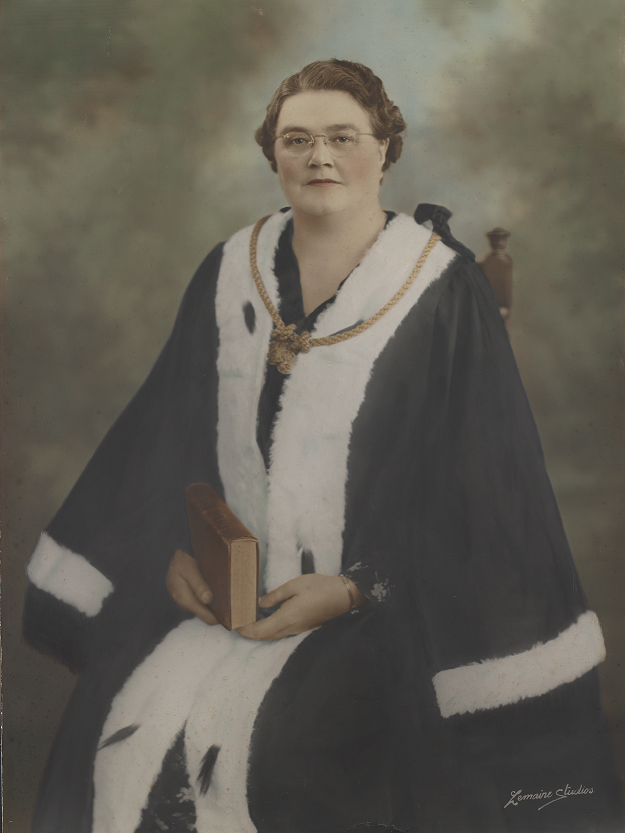
Australia's first woman mayor was Lilian Fowler, who began her tenure as mayor of Newtown in 1938.

1930

A. F. Board, first woman elected mayor of Watford, England, United Kingdom
Sadiye Hanım, first woman elected mayor in Turkey when elected for Kılıçkaya in Artvin
Essie Ward, first woman elected mayor of King City, Missouri, United States
Luiza Zavloschi, first woman elected mayor in Romania when elected for Buda (Bogdănești)

1931

Clara E. Grauert, the 72-year-old widow of Emile W. Grauert chosen to fill the office of her husband as mayor of Weehawken, New Jersey
Miriam Moses, first woman elected mayor of Stepney, England, United Kingdom

also the first Jewish woman mayor in the United Kingdom

Phenie Lou Ownby, first woman elected mayor of Broken Arrow, Oklahoma, United States
Julia Platt, first woman elected mayor of Pacific Grove, California, United States
Grace Prescott, first woman elected mayor of Godmanchester, England, United Kingdom

1932

Stella Alexander, first woman elected mayor of Issaquah, Washington, United States
Edna Allen, first woman elected mayor of Jefferson, Oregon, United States
Elsie Kimber, first woman elected mayor of Newbury, England, United Kingdom
June G. Olsen, first woman elected mayor of Ekalaka, Montana, United States

1933

Elena Azcuy, first woman mayor of Consolación del Norte, Cuba

Azcuy was the first woman to serve as mayor of a Cuban municipality.

Doris W. Bradway, first woman mayor of Wildwood, New Jersey, United States
Lily Sophia Tawney, first woman elected mayor of Oxford, England, United Kingdom

in 1960, the title was changed to Lord Mayor of Oxford.

Clara Marie Emma Heiser, first woman elected mayor of Ellsworth, Kansas, United States

1934

Mrs. Solomon S. Youmans, first woman mayor of Oak Park, Georgia, United States

1935

Alicia Cañas, first female elected mayor in Chile, the first of Providencia
Louise Bucks, first woman elected mayor of Waconia, Minnesota, United States

1936

Ella M. Amdahl, first woman elected mayor of Hingham, Montana, United States
Aurora Mesa Andraca, first woman mayor of Chilpancingo, Mexico
Barbara Hanley, first woman elected mayor in Canada when elected to office in Webbwood, Ontario
Evalina Herd, first woman elected mayor of Kevin, Montana, United States
Ann Eliza Longden, first woman elected Lord Mayor of Sheffield, England, United Kingdom

1937

Mary Lucy Kyle Hartson, first woman elected mayor of Kyle, Texas, United States
Ines V. Serion, first woman elected mayor in Philippines—elected in Vallehermoso, Negros Oriental
Kathrine Wykle, mayor of Clyde, New York, United States

also the first woman mayor in New York

1938

Nellie Babcock, first woman mayor of Rochester, Indiana, United States
Lilian Fowler, first woman mayor in Australia, at Newtown
Lady Gwladys Delamere, first woman mayor of Nairobi, Kenya Colony (today Kenya)
Nettie Terrill, first woman elected mayor of Dixon, Wyoming, United States

Terrill ran unopposed

1939

Kathleen Clarke, first woman Lord Mayor of Dublin, Ireland (Republic of Ireland)
Graciela Contreras, first woman elected mayor in Santiago, Chile
Alice Burke, first woman elected as mayor in New England—in Westfield, Massachusetts, United States

== 1940s ==
1940

Mary Ellen Presnell Brendle, first woman mayor of Englewood, Tennessee, United States

1941

Elsie Chamberlain, first woman mayor of Bangor, Gwynedd, Wales, United Kingdom
Marie Elizabeth May Bell, first woman mayor of Windhoek, South West Africa (today Namibia)
Edna Annie Crichton, first woman Lord Mayor of York, England, United Kingdom

1942

Gladys Maasdorp, first woman mayor of Salisbury, Southern Rhodesia (today Harare, Zimbabwe)
Jessie Beatrice Kitson, first woman Lord Mayor of Leeds, England, United Kingdom

took office after the previous male holder, Arthur Clark, died in office

Jessie Reed, first woman elected mayor of Seal Beach, California, United States

1943

Edith May Greenan, first woman to serve as mayor of Avalon, New Jersey, United States
Nellie Grace Ibbott, first woman mayor of Heidelberg, Victoria, Australia

1945

Mary Dondero, first woman mayor of Portsmouth, New Hampshire, United States
Ursula Meisterernst, first woman mayor of Arnstadt, Germany

Meisterernst was the first woman to serve as mayor in Germany.

Mabel Nielsen, first woman mayor of Panguitch, Utah, United States
Odette Roux, first woman mayor of Les Sables-d'Olonne and the first woman mayor in France
Walker, first woman mayor of Lisle (village), New York, United States

1946

Virginia Oteyza-De Guia, first woman mayor of Baguio, Philippines
Doris Barnes, first woman elected mayor of Wrangell, Alaska, United States
Truus Smulders-Beliën, first woman mayor of Oost-, West- en Middelbeers and the first woman mayor in Netherlands
Luise Albertz, first woman elected mayor in Oberhausen and the first elected female mayor (Oberbürgermeisterin) in Germany
Felisa Rincón de Gautier, first woman mayor of San Juan, Puerto Rico

first woman mayor of a capital city in United States soil

Ninetta Bartoli and Ada Natali, first women mayors in Italy, elected on the same day

1947

Juliet M. Gregory, first woman elected mayor of Missoula, Montana, United States
Mary Kingsmill Jones, first elected female Lord Mayor of Manchester, England, United Kingdom
Louise Schroeder, first female mayor of Berlin, Germany

1948

Zenzi Hölzl, first female mayor of Gloggnitz and also the first female mayor in Austria
Belle Cooledge, first female mayor of Sacramento, California, United States
Mildred Stark, first female mayor of East Detroit (now Eastpointe), Michigan

also first female mayor in Michigan

1949

Gertrude A. Richardson, first woman mayor of Taree, New South Wales, Australia

also the first woman mayor of a municipality in New South Wales

Beryl Archbald Crichlow, first female mayor of San Fernando, and the first woman elected mayor in Trinidad and Tobago
Dorothy McCullough Lee, first woman mayor of Portland, Oregon, United States
Edith P. Welty, first woman mayor of Yonkers, New York, United States
Salawati Daud, first woman mayor of Makassar, Indonesia and the first female mayor in Indonesia
Bertha Trim, first woman elected mayor of Plainview, Minnesota, United States

== 1950s ==
1950

Dorothy Davis, first woman mayor of Washington, Virginia, United States
Kathleen Harper, first woman to serve as mayor of Bath, England, United Kingdom
Jacquetta Marshall, first woman mayor of Plymouth, England, United Kingdom
Dorothy Painter Crawford, first woman elected mayor in Mississippi, Madison, Mississippi (United States)
Erika Keck, first woman elected mayor in Ahrensburg and the first elected female mayor (Bürgermeisterin) in Germany
Katharine Elkus White, first woman mayor of Red Bank, New Jersey, United States
Müfide İlhan, first woman elected mayor in Turkey and of Mersin
Augustine Magdalena Waworuntu, first woman mayor of Manado, Indonesia
Rohana Muthalib, first woman mayor of Pontianak, Indonesia

1951

Blanche Barkl, first woman mayor of Bankstown, New South Wales, Australia
Miriam Cummings, first woman elected mayor of Mill Valley, California, United States
Rebekah H. Hord, first woman mayor in Kentucky and Maysville, Kentucky, United States
Emily L. Perry, first woman mayor of Floyd, Iowa, United States
Charlotte Whitton, first woman elected mayor of Ottawa, Ontario, Canada
Olga Maturana, first woman elected mayor of Pichilemu, Chile
Vera Martucci, first woman appointed mayor of Teterboro, New Jersey, United States

1952

Violet Grantham, first woman elected Lord Mayor of Newcastle-upon-Tyne, England, United Kingdom
Alice S. Johnson, first woman elected mayor of Boston, Lincolnshire, England, United Kingdom
Martha Priscilla Shaw, first woman elected Mayor of Sumter, South Carolina, United States

1953

Elsie Gibbons, first woman elected mayor of a municipality in the Canadian province of Quebec (Canada)
Agnes Israelson, first woman elected mayor in Thief River Falls, Minnesota, United States

1954

Dorothy Porter, first woman elected mayor in Nevada and first woman elected mayor of North Las Vegas, Nevada, United States
Dorothy N. Dolbey, first woman elected mayor in Cincinnati, Ohio, United States
Emílie Knotková, first woman elected mayor in Liberec, Czechoslovakia
Olive Louise Urquhart, first woman mayor of Pointe-Claire, Quebec, Canada

also the first woman mayor in Quebec

Adela Van Severen, first woman mayor of Santa Tecla, El Salvador

also the first woman mayor in the country

1955

Ragina Balas, first woman elected mayor of Ferry Village, New York, United States
Jane Forrester, first woman elected mayor of Belleville, Ontario, Canada
Maud Godsmark, first woman elected mayor of Gatooma, Southern Rhodesia (now Kadoma, Zimbabwe)
Alba Roballo, first woman elected to the (then collective) Municipal Council of Montevideo, Uruguay
Mary Van Stevens, first woman elected mayor of Heppner, Oregon, United States

1956

Maria Desylla-Kapodistria, first woman elected mayor in Greece and of Corfu (city)
Dorothy Edwards, first woman elected mayor in Tasmania, Australia and of Launceston
Hannah Levin, first woman mayor of Rishon LeZion, Israel
Smt. Sulochana M. Modi, first woman elected mayor in Mumbai, India
Myrth Sarvela, first woman elected mayor of Sitka, Alaska, United States
Mary Estus Jones Webb, first woman to serve as Mayor-President of Baton Rouge, Louisiana, United States
Winnifred Breward, first woman elected mayor of West Hartlepool, United Kingdom

1957

Lolita Cass, first mayor of Watkins Glen, New York, United States
Josephine Fey, first woman mayor in Laramie, Wyoming, United States
Hulda Dóra Jakobsdóttir, first woman elected mayor in Kópavogur and first female mayor in Iceland
Elizabeth Hall, first woman mayor of Sag Harbor, New York
Betty Potter, first woman mayor of Mount Kisco, New York, United States

1958

Aruna Asaf Ali, first woman elected mayor in Delhi, India
Tara Cherian, first woman elected mayor in Chennai, India
Iris Winnifred King, first woman elected mayor in Kingston, Jamaica
Aldamira Guedes Fernandes, first woman elected mayor in Brazil and also first female mayor of Quixeramobim
Ester Roa, first woman elected mayor in Concepción, Chile
Mary Pearce, first woman elected Lord Mayor of Leeds, England, United Kingdom

1959

Barbara Ashton, first woman elected mayor of Que Que, Southern Rhodesia (today Kwekwe, Zimbabwe)
Helena Evans, first woman elected Lord Mayor of Cardiff, Wales, United Kingdom
Jane Dowdall, first woman elected Lord Mayor of Cork, Ireland (Republic of Ireland)
Joyce Newton-Thompson, first woman elected mayor of Cape Town, South Africa

== 1960s ==
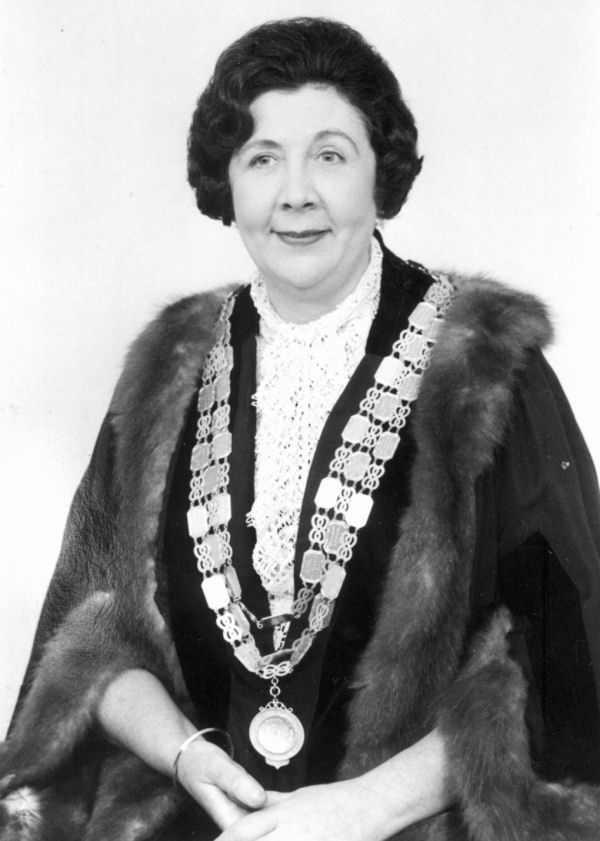
The first woman mayor in Queensland, Australia was Nellie Robinson, who was mayor of Toowoomba from 1967 to 1981.

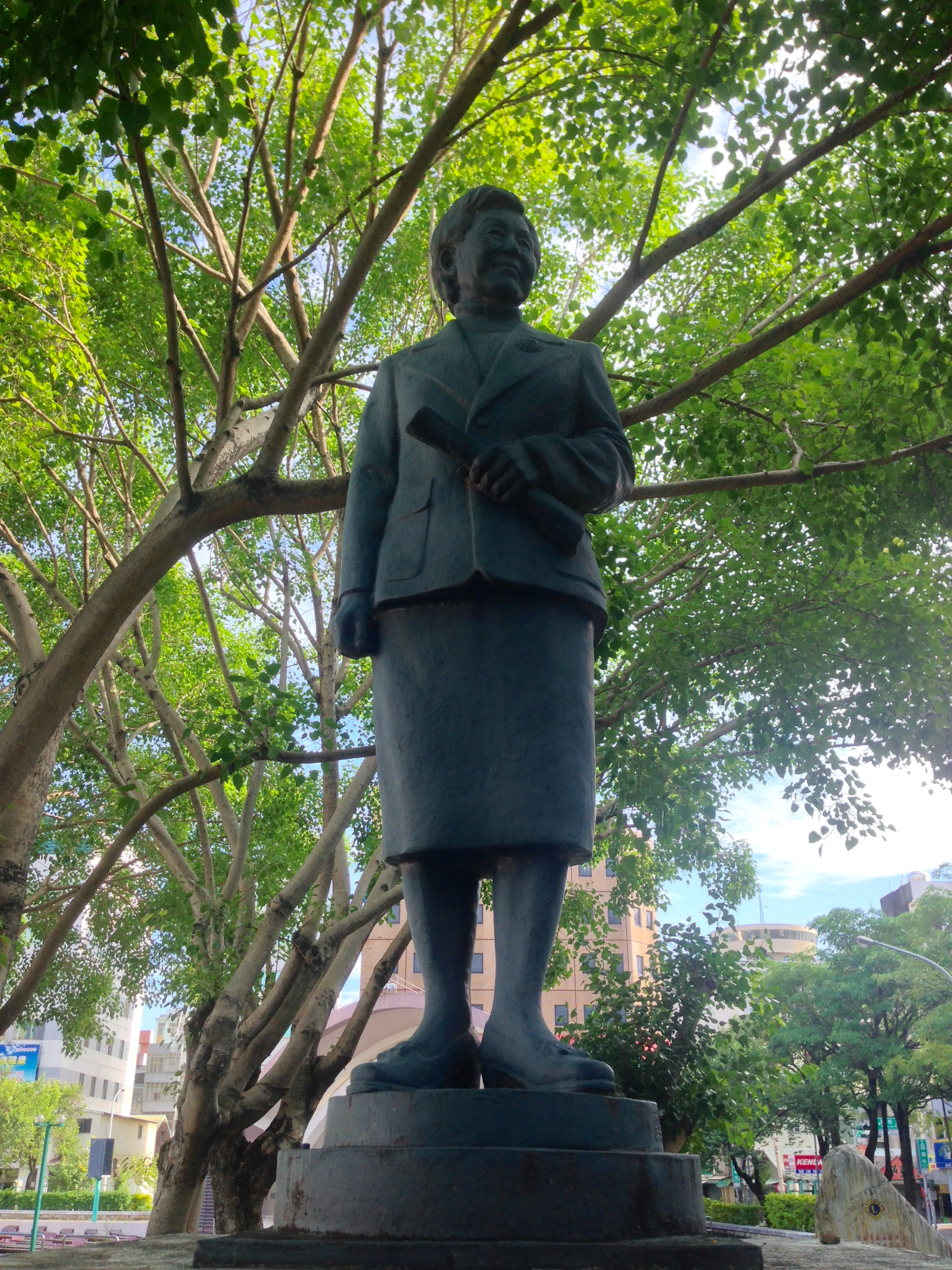
A statue depicting Taiwan's first woman mayor, Hsu Shih-hsien, who was first elected in 1968. She was elected for a second term in 1982.

1960

Auður Auðuns, first woman mayor of Reykjavík, Iceland
Dame Jean Roberts, first woman Lord Provost of Glasgow, Scotland, United Kingdom

first woman lord provost. "Provost" is used instead of "mayor" in Scotland

Margot Brett, first woman mayor of Bulawayo, Southern Rhodesia (today Zimbabwe)
Bessie Bicknell, first woman mayor of Bournemouth, England, United Kingdom

1961

Barbara Saben, first woman mayor of Kampala, Uganda
May Ross McDowell, first woman elected mayor of Johnson City, Tennessee, United States
Violet Kusbel Cimbora, first woman elected mayor in Florida. Mayor of Masaryktown, Florida, United States
Myrtle Reed, first woman mayor of Grand River, Ohio, United States

1962

Araguacy Gonçalves, first woman elected mayor of Antônio Gonçalves, Bahia, Brazil
Eleanor P. Sheppard, first woman elected mayor of Richmond, Virginia, United States
Leonida Tămaș, first woman mayor of Timișoara, Romania

1963

Teena Clifton, first woman mayor of Rolling Hills, California, United States
Florence E. Douglas, first woman elected mayor of Vallejo, California, United States
Marian Erdmann, first woman elected mayor of Great Falls, Montana, United States
Ann Hitch Kilgore, first woman mayor of Hampton, Virginia, United States
Anita Fernandini de Naranjo, first woman mayor of Lima, Peru
Florence Mills Brown, first woman elected lord mayor of Bristol, England, United Kingdom

1964

Lenore Bishop, first woman mayor of Mount Gambier, South Australia, Australia

also first woman mayor in South Australia

Vera Kolarič, first woman mayor of Maribor (present Slovenia)
Margaret H. Prickett, first woman elected mayor of Mishawaka, Indiana, United States

1965

Norma O. Walker, first woman mayor of Aurora, Colorado, United States
Annie Major, first elected female Lord mayor of Kingston upon Hull, England, United Kingdom
Florence Kathleen Lower, first woman elected Lord Mayor of Oxford, England, United Kingdom
Maxine Patterson, first woman elected mayor of Edgerton, Wyoming, United States
Grace Onyango, first woman elected mayor of Kisumu, Kenya

also the first African woman who was a mayor of an African city

1966

Sarita Baracat, first woman mayor of Várzea Grande, Mato Grosso, Brazil
Katherine Green, became the first female mayor of Eureka Spring, Arkansas.
Constance Cummings-John, first appointed woman mayor of Freetown, Sierra Leone
Bernice Stokke, first woman mayor of Petersburg, Alaska, United States

1967

Norma Villareal de Zambrano, first woman mayor in Mexico
Ann Uccello, first woman mayor of Hartford, Connecticut, United States
Grace Hartman, first woman mayor of Sudbury, Ontario, Canada
Janet Wesonga, first woman mayor of Mbale, Uganda
Mary "Peggy" Kerr, first woman mayor of Sayreville, New Jersey, United States

was elected with three female councilwomen, creating the first female-majority municipal government in New Jersey

Nellie Robinson, first woman mayor of Toowoomba, Queensland, Australia

also the first woman mayor in Queensland

Marie Madoé Sivomey, first woman mayor of Lomé, Togo

also the first woman mayor in the country

1968

Silvia Boza, first woman mayor of Las Condes, Chile
Dorothy Corrigan, first woman elected mayor of Charlottetown, Prince Edward Island, Canada
Lise Girardin, first woman mayor of Geneva, Switzerland
Hsu Shih-Hsien, first woman elected mayor of Chiayi City and the first woman elected mayor in Taiwan
Rena Parker, first woman mayor of Corona, California, United States
Jean Robinson, first woman elected mayor of Blackpool, England, United Kingdom

1969

Pilar Careaga Basabe, first woman mayor of Bilbao, Spain
Eve Homeyer, first woman elected mayor of Aspen, Colorado, United States
Viola Phillips, first woman mayor elected in Loveland, Ohio, United States

also first woman mayor in Hamilton County

== 1970s ==
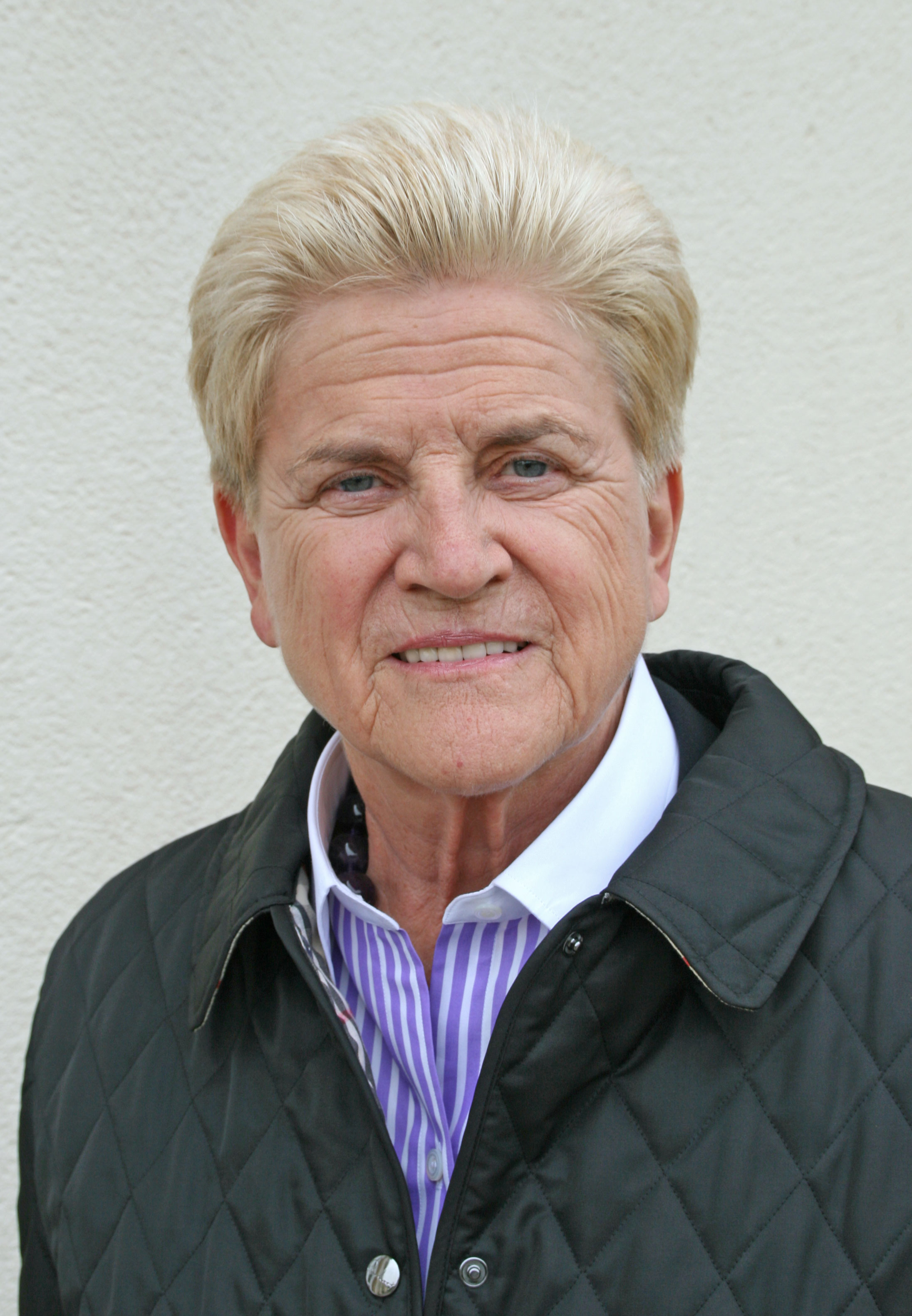
Luxembourg City elected its first woman mayor, Colette Flesch, in 1970.

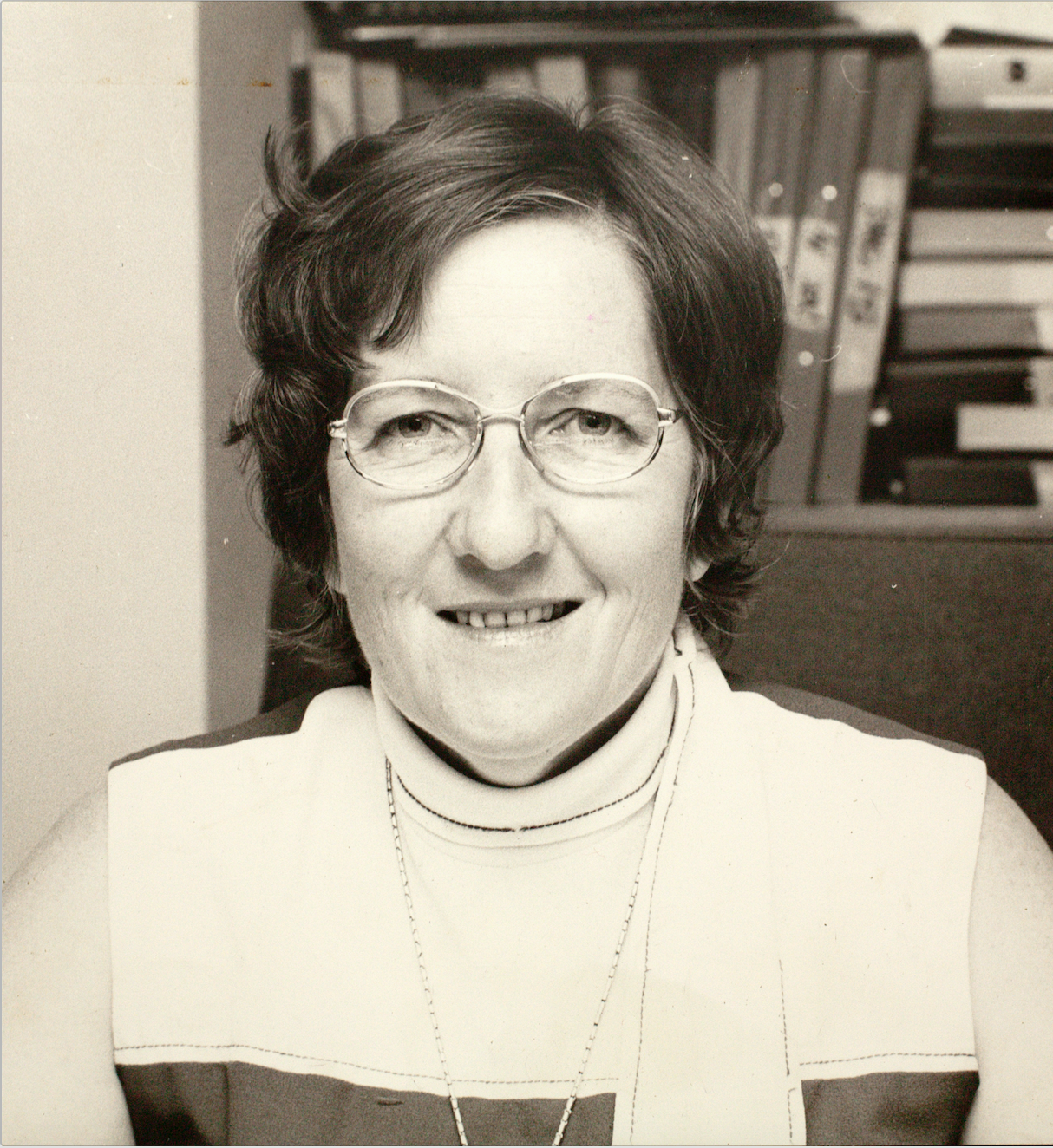
In 1975, Ella Stack became the first woman elected lord mayor of Darwin, Australia.

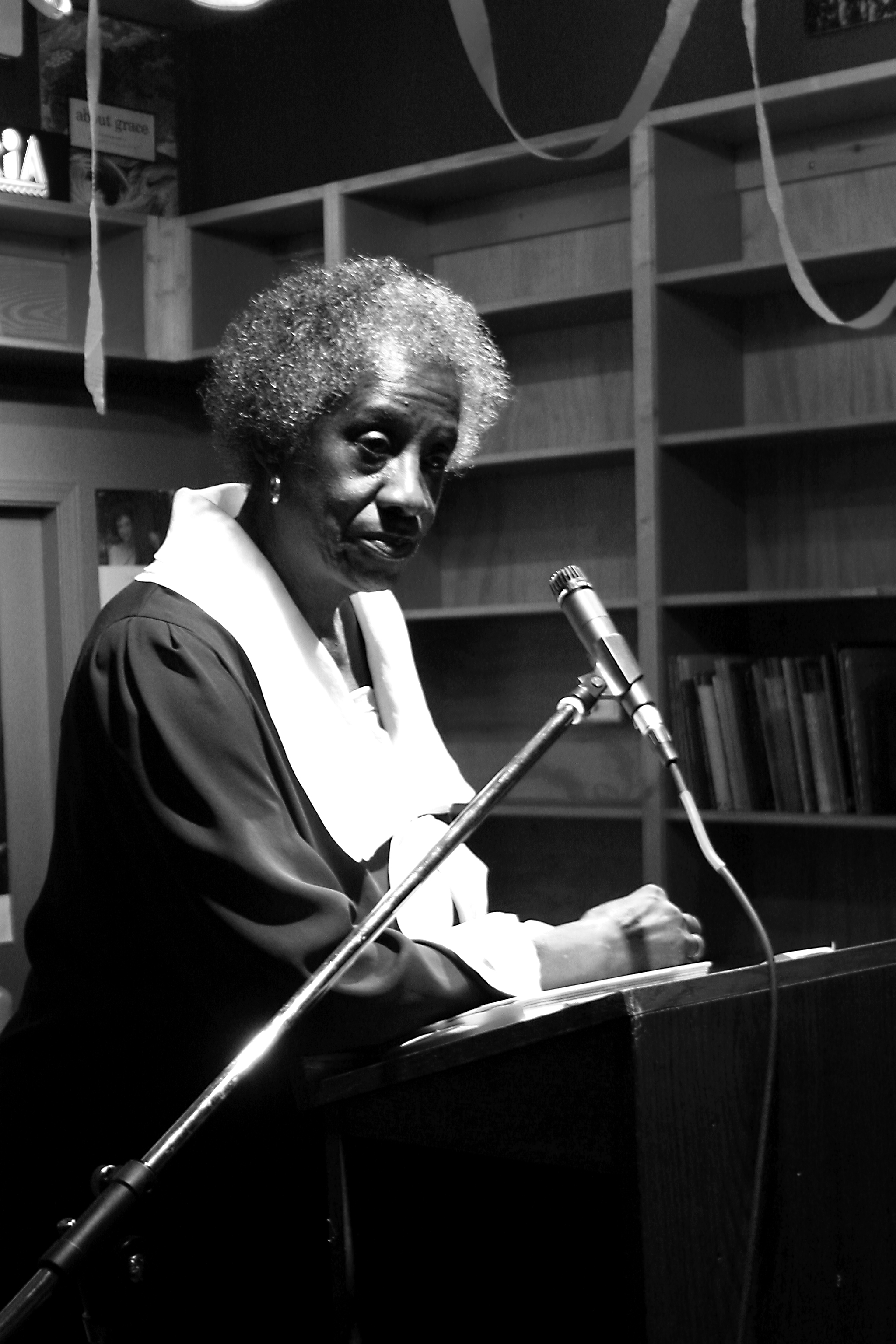
Unita Blackwell was the first African American woman elected mayor in Mississippi. She served as mayor of Mayersville from 1976 to 2001.

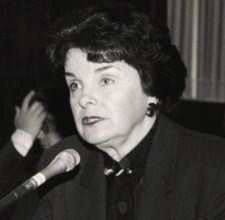
On 4 December 1978, Dianne Feinstein was named acting mayor of San Francisco, making her the city's first woman mayor. In 1979, she ran and won as mayor, making her the first elected woman to serve as mayor in San Francisco.

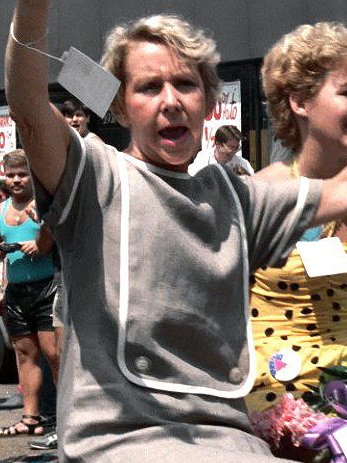
Jane Byrne was the first woman elected mayor of Chicago, Illinois in 1979.

1970

Margaret Kenyatta, first black female mayor of Nairobi, Kenya
Dabir Azam Hosna, first woman elected mayor of Babolsar, Iran
Colette Flesch, first woman elected mayor of Luxembourg, Luxembourg

1971

Patience Latting, first woman elected mayor of Oklahoma City, Oklahoma, United States

Latting was also the first female mayor of any major U.S. city with more than 350,000 residents.

Kathryn Kirschbaum, first woman elected mayor of Davenport, Iowa, United States
Lorette Wood, first woman mayor of Santa Cruz, California, United States
Norene Mosley, first woman elected mayor of Polson, Montana, United States

1972

Mila Elaine Cameron, first woman elected mayor of Point Comfort, Texas, United States
Ellen Walker Craig-Jones, first woman elected mayor of Urbancrest, Ohio, United States

also the first African-American woman to be elected mayor by popular vote of a United States municipality.

Phyllis Loe, first woman elected Lord mayor of Portsmouth, United Kingdom
Jane Bigelow, first woman mayor of London, Ontario, Canada
Stella Harris Oaks, first woman to serve as mayor of Vernal, Utah, United States

Oaks was served as acting mayor

Marian Perry Whitehurst, first woman mayor of Chesapeake, Virginia, United States

1973

Jemima Cook, first woman elected mayor of Twin Bridges, Montana, United States
Doris A. Davis, first woman mayor of Compton, California, United States
Lelia Foley, first woman mayor of Taft, Oklahoma (United States)
Eileen Lloyd, first woman elected mayor of Keansburg, New Jersey, United States
Marjorie Alice Brown, first woman elected Lord mayor of Birmingham, United Kingdom
Julianne M. Jensen was elected the first woman mayor of Knoxville, Iowa, United States
Barbara Impellittiere, first woman elected mayor of Cold Spring, New York, United States
Jane Tolmach first woman elected Mayor of Oxnard, California, United States

1974

Diane L. Bervig, First elected Mayor of Williston, North Dakota, United States A chance meeting, a day of fun
Janet Gray Hayes, first woman elected mayor of San Jose, California, United States

Hayes was also the first female mayor of a major U.S. city with more than 500,000 residents.

Eleanor Kieliszek, first woman elected mayor of Teaneck, New Jersey, United States
Anne Kaplan, first woman mayor of Monticello, New York, United States

1975

Ruth Blankman, first woman elected mayor of Canton, New York, United States
Helen Boosalis, first woman elected mayor of Lincoln, Nebraska, United States
Mary Byrne, first woman elected mayor of Galway, Ireland (Republic of Ireland)
Ione Christensen, first woman elected mayor of Whitehorse, Yukon, Canada
Lila Cockrell, first woman elected mayor of San Antonio, Texas, United States
Joy Cummings, first woman elected Lord Mayor of Newcastle (New South Wales), Australia
Beth Finch, first woman elected mayor of Fayetteville, North Carolina, United States
Betty Edmondson, first woman mayor of Yakima, Washington, United States
Evelyn Helena Parker, first woman mayor of Subiaco, Western Australia, Australia

also the first woman mayor in Western Australia

Connie Ames Peters, first woman elected mayor of Wichita, Kansas, United States
Jeannette Plambeck, first woman mayor of Burns, Wyoming, United States
Eleanor A. Simpson, first woman elected mayor in Old Westbury, New York, United States

also first woman elected mayor in Nassau County, New York

Ella Stack, first woman elected Lord Mayor of Darwin, Australia

1976

Unita Blackwell, first African American woman elected mayor in Mississippi, United States

served as Mayor of Mayersville, Mississippi from 1976 to 2001

Sofía Medina de López, first woman elected mayor of Medellín, Colombia
Adelina Rodriguez, first woman elected mayor of Quezon City, Philippines
Margaret Hance, first woman elected mayor of Phoenix, Arizona, United States
Adlene Harrison, first woman mayor of Dallas, Texas, United States
Floretta K. Lauber, first woman mayor of Arcadia, California, United States
Dorothy Wilken, first woman elected mayor of Boca Raton, Florida, United States
Phyllis Sweeney, first woman elected mayor of Laguna Beach, California, United States

1977

Maria Barnaby Greenwald, first woman elected mayor of Cherry Hill, New Jersey
Isabella Cannon, first woman elected mayor of Raleigh, North Carolina, United States
Eleanor Crouch, first woman elected mayor of Santa Paula, California, United States
Joyce Ebert, first woman to serve as mayor of Everett Washington, United States
Carole Keeton Strayhorn, first woman elected mayor of Austin, Texas, United States
Betty Marshall, first woman elected mayor of York, Pennsylvania, United States
Suzi Oppenheimer, first woman elected mayor of Mamaroneck (village), New York, United States
Mathilde Schroyens, first woman elected mayor of Antwerp, Belgium

1978

Dianne Feinstein, first woman and first person of Jewish faith to serve as mayor of San Francisco, United States

Feinstein was appointed mayor on 4 December 1978 following the shooting death of her predecessor, George Moscone. In 1979, she became the first woman elected Mayor of San Francisco.

Enma González, first elected female mayor of Vigo, Spain
Dusty Miller, first woman elected Mayor of Thunder Bay, Ontario, Canada
Marjorie Carroll, first woman elected mayor of Waterloo, Ontario, Canada
Helen Wilkes, first woman to become mayor of West Palm Beach, Florida, United States
Frances Prince, first woman to become mayor of Thousand Oaks, California, United States

also served 1983 to 1984

Carrie Kent, first African-American woman mayor of Walthourville, Georgia, United States

1979

Núria Albó, first woman elected mayor of La Garriga, Spain
Jane M. Byrne, first woman elected mayor of Chicago, Illinois, United States, United States

Byrne was also the first female mayor of any United States city with more than 3 million residents.

Clo Hoover, first woman elected mayor of Santa Monica, California, United States
Delitha Kilgore, first woman elected mayor of Lewiston, Idaho, United States
Virginia Smith, first woman mayor of Ticonderoga, New York, United States
Regina Zokosky, first woman elected mayor of Indio, California, United States

== 1980s ==
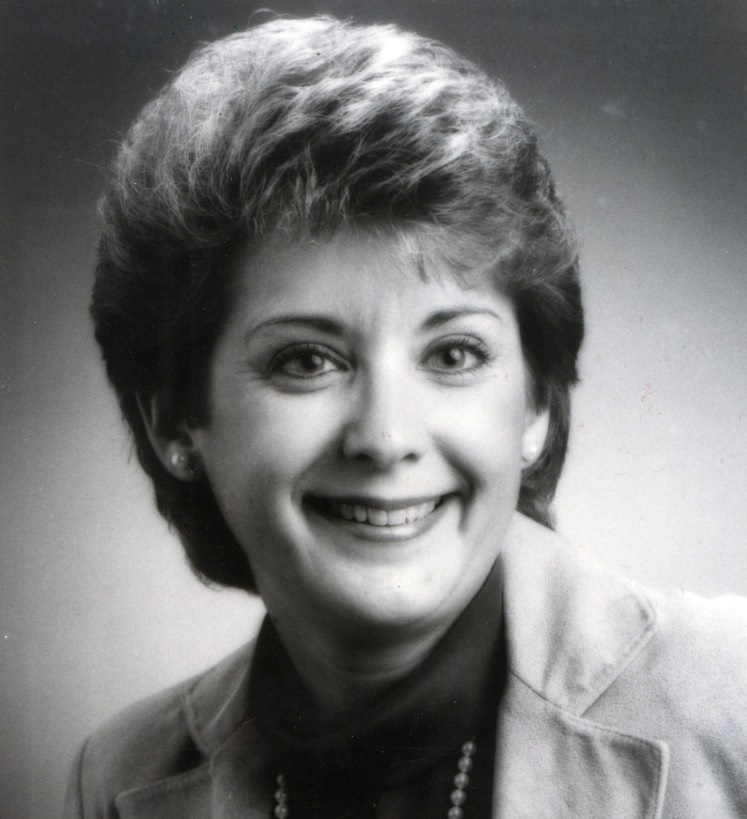
Kathryn J. Whitmire was the first woman elected mayor of Houston, Texas in 1982.

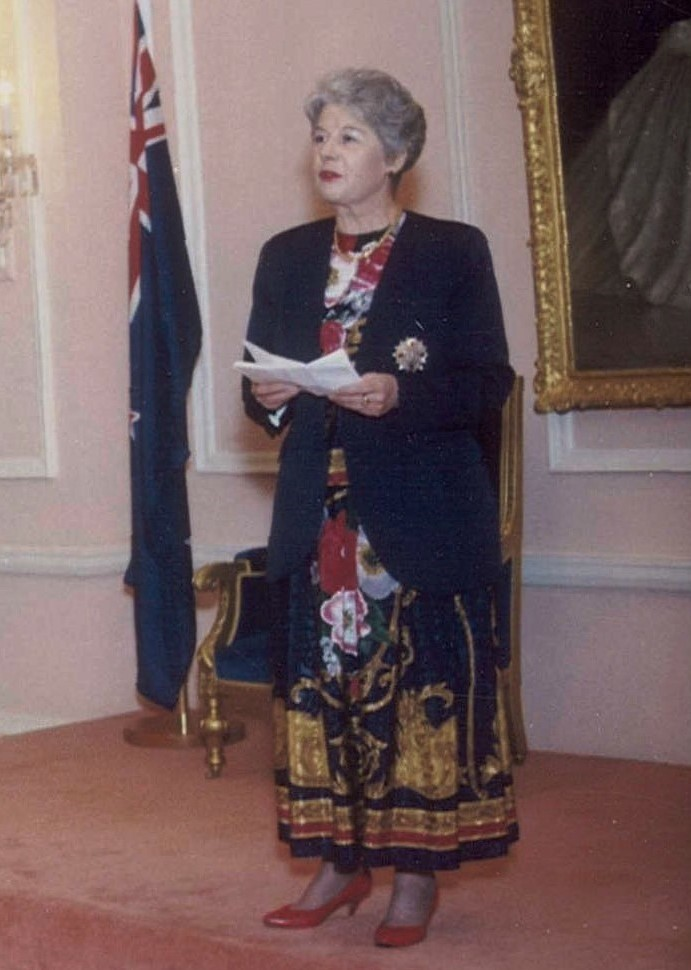
The first woman mayor of Auckland City, Catherine Tizard, was elected in 1983.

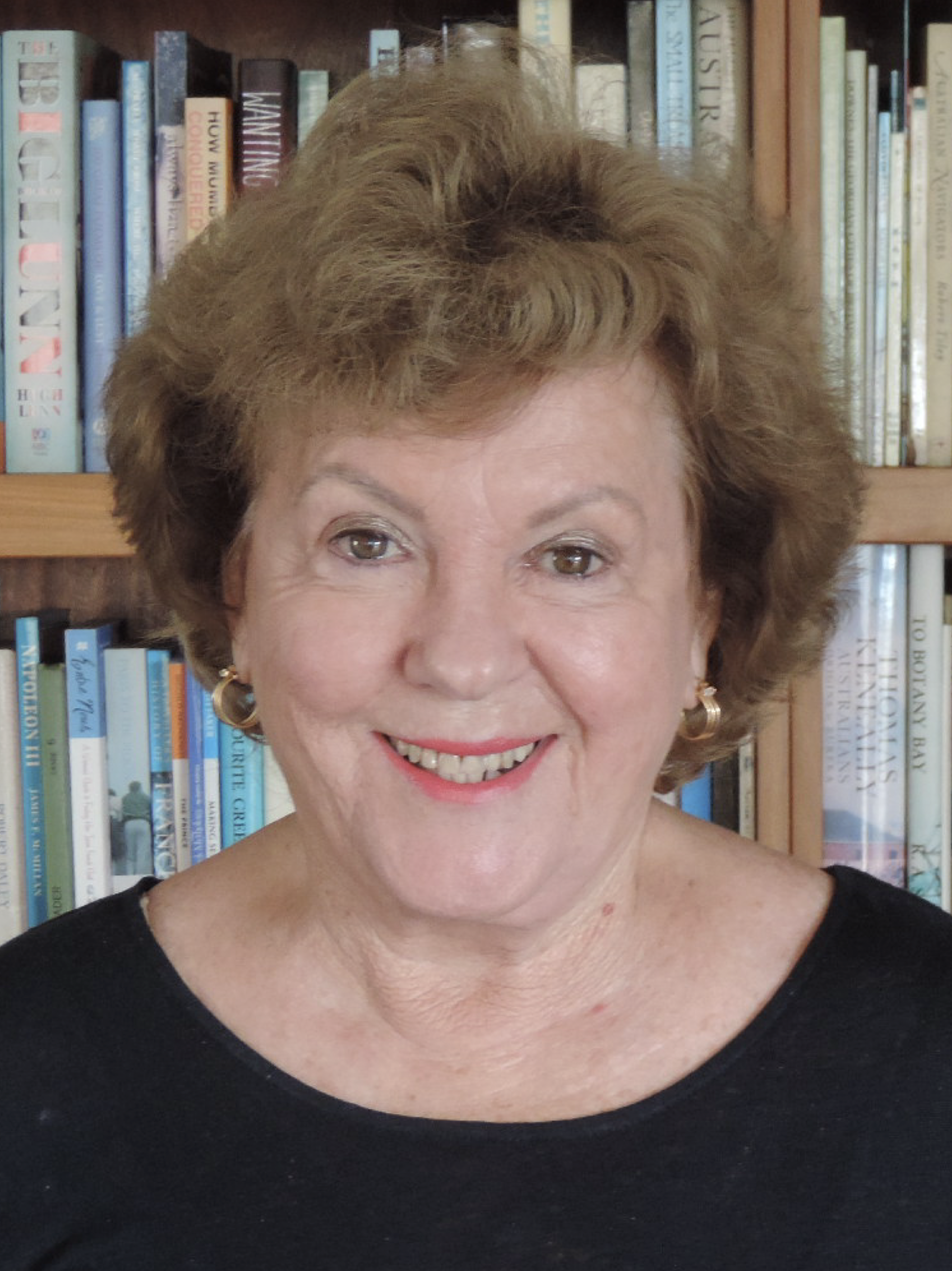
Sallyanne Atkinson was the first woman elected lord mayor of Brisbane, Australia in 1985.

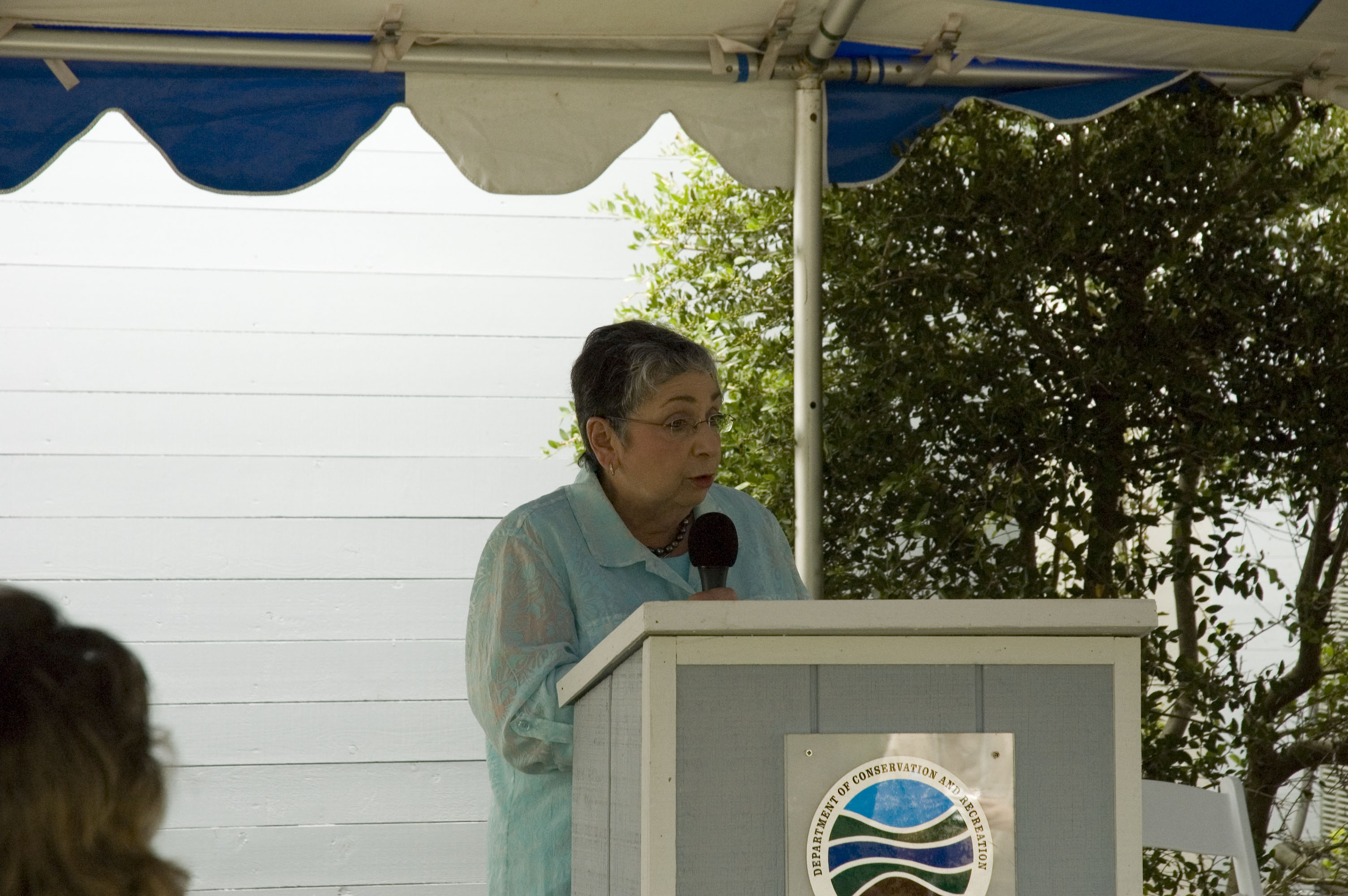
Virginia Beach first elected Meyera Oberndorf mayor in 1988, making her the city's first woman mayor. She served in that capacity until 2009.

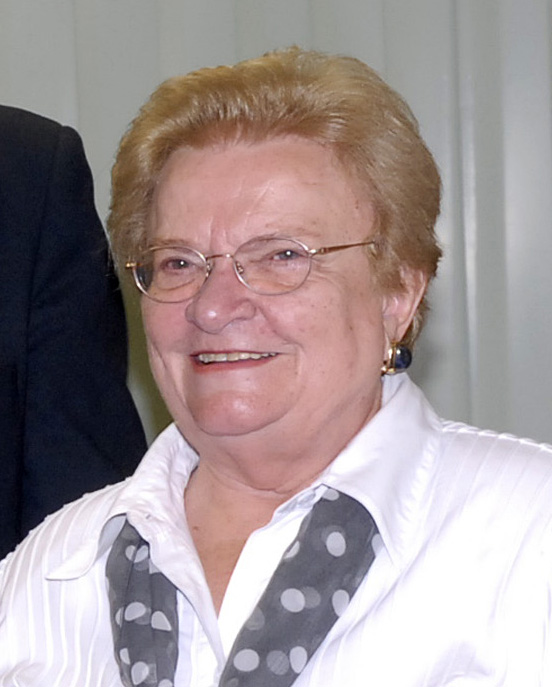
In 1989, Luiza Erundina became the first woman mayor of São Paulo, Brazil.

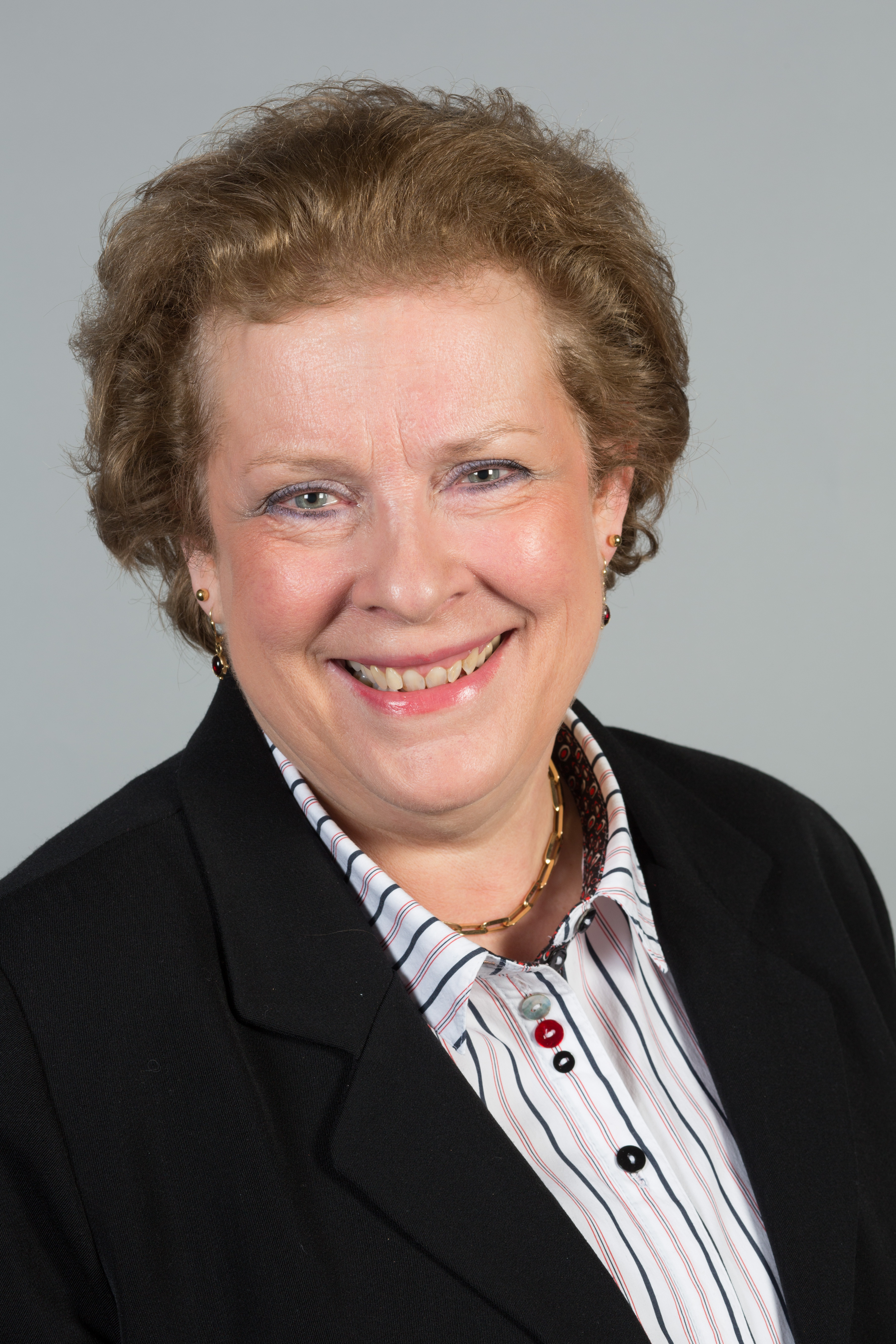
In 1989, Strasbourg, France elected its first woman mayor, Catherine Trautmann.

1980

Janice Bateman, first woman mayor of Berwick, Victoria, Australia
Sr. Carolyn Farrell, first woman elected mayor of Dubuque, Iowa, United States

Farrell was the first nun elected mayor in Iowa

Josephine Heckman, first woman elected mayor of Pasadena, California, United States
Patricia Logan, first woman elected mayor of Noblesville, Indiana, United States
Janet Smith, first woman elected mayor of St. Albans (city), Vermont, United States

less than a week after she was sworn-in Smith was shot and killed at her home. Barbara Shinpoch, first woman mayor of Renton, Washington, United States.

1981

Joy Burgess, first woman elected mayor of Milwaukie, Oregon, United States
Ruth Burleigh, first woman elected mayor of Bend, Oregon, United States
Juanita Crabb, first woman elected Mayor of Binghamton, New York, United States
Eileen Anderson, first woman elected mayor of Honolulu, Hawaii, United States
Maria Barnaby Greenwald, first woman elected mayor of Cherry Hill, New Jersey, United States

previously served from 1977 to 1979 as chosen by city council

Violet Khouri, first woman elected mayor of Kafr Yasif and the first female mayor in Israel
Mary K. Shell, first woman elected mayor of Bakersfield, California, United States
Deborah Ponder Baker, first woman mayor of Hot Springs, North Carolina, United States
Dr. G. M. Wells, first woman elected mayor of Enterprise, Kansas, United States

1982

Claudette Kaye McCrary, first woman elected mayor of Casper, Wyoming, United States
Kathryn J. Whitmire, first woman elected mayor of Houston, Texas, United States
Tina Tomlje, first woman mayor of Ljubljana, present Slovenia
Grace Bannister, first woman elected Lord Mayor of Belfast, United Kingdom
Patricia Rustad, first woman elected mayor of Beaconsfield, Quebec, Canada
Kit Ward, first woman mayor of Nuneaton and Bedworth, England, United Kingdom
Sue Marie Young, first woman elected mayor of Richfield, Utah, United States

1983

Mary Donaldson, Baroness Donaldson of Lymington, first woman elected Lord Mayor of London, England, United Kingdom
Luiza Erundina, first woman elected mayor of São Paulo, Brasil (Brazil)
Wendy Chapman, first woman elected Lord Mayor of Adelaide, Australia
Edith Henningsgaard, first woman elected mayor of Astoria, Oregon, United States
Elizabeth Kishkon, first woman elected mayor of Windsor, Ontario, Canada
Sue Miller, first woman elected mayor of Salem, Oregon, United States
Eve Poole, first woman elected mayor of Invercargill, New Zealand
Elda Pucci, first woman elected mayor of Palermo, Italy

also the first female mayor of an Italian city

Catherine Tizard, first woman elected mayor of Auckland, New Zealand
Helen Westberg, first woman mayor of Carbondale, Illinois, United States

1984

Daurene Lewis, first black female mayor in Nova Scotia, Canada (Annapolis Royal)
Mary Kate Stovall, first female, and first African American mayor of Hurtsboro, Alabama, United States

also first African-American woman mayor in the state of Alabama

Donna Owens, first woman elected Mayor of Toledo, Ohio, United States
Karen Johnson, first woman elected mayor of Schenectady, New York, United States
Elsie Wayne, first woman elected mayor of Saint John, New Brunswick Canada

1985

Sallyanne Atkinson, first woman elected Lord Mayor of Brisbane, Australia

first woman member of the Liberal Party of Australia to serve as Lord Mayor

Ella Bengel, first woman elected mayor of New Bern, North Carolina, United States
Dee Donne, first woman elected mayor of Torrington, Connecticut, United States
Bogdana Glumac-Levakov, first woman elected mayor of Zrenjanin, present Serbia
Shirley Huffman, first woman elected mayor of Hillsboro, Oregon, United States
Lorna Kesterson, first woman elected mayor of Henderson, Nevada, United States
Karen Kirby, first woman elected mayor of Miami Shores, Florida, United States
Gerri Lynn O'Connor, first woman elected mayor of Uxbridge, Ontario, Canada
Ann Pomykal, first woman elected mayor of Lewisville, Texas, United States
Joan Barr, first woman elected mayor of Evanston, Illinois, United States
Kristi M. Vetri, first woman elected mayor of O'Fallon, Illinois, United States

1986

Julene Kennerly, first woman elected mayor of Browning, Montana, United States

also the first Native American woman elected mayor in the United States

Alexis Ord, first woman elected mayor of Lord Mayor of Melbourne, Australia
Gretchen Brewin, first woman elected mayor of Victoria, British Columbia, Canada
Doone Kennedy, first woman elected Lord Mayor of Hobart, Tasmania, Australia
Maria Luíza Fontenele, first woman elected mayor of Fortaleza, Ceará, Brasil (Brazil)
Maureen O'Connor, first woman elected mayor of San Diego, California, United States
Jessie M. Rattley, first woman and African American elected by fellow Council members as mayor of the City of Newport News, Virginia, United States
Lois Reed, first woman elected mayor of Malinta, Ohio, United States

Reed served for ten minutes before tendering her resignation

Willie Mae Leake, first woman and first African American mayor of Chester, Pennsylvania

1987

Maria Magnani Noya, first woman elected mayor of Turin, Italy
Carrie Saxon Perry, first woman elected mayor of Hartford, Connecticut, United States
Sandra Warshaw Freedman, first woman elected mayor of Tampa, Florida, United States
May Cutler, first woman elected mayor of Westmount, Quebec, Canada (United States)
Sue Myack, first woman elected mayor of Charlotte, North Carolina, United States
Lottie Shackelford, first woman to serve as mayor of Little Rock, Arkansas, United States
Laura Slate, first woman elected mayor of Gouverneur, New York, United States
Annette Strauss, first woman elected mayor of Dallas, Texas, United States
Betty Turner, first woman elected mayor of Corpus Christi, Texas, United States
Helen Perkins, first woman elected mayor of Hollandale, Mississippi, United States

also the city's first African American mayor

1988

Agnes Devanadera, first woman elected mayor of Sampaloc, Quezon, Philippines
Elizabeth H. Dwarica, first woman elected mayor of Leonia, New Jersey, United States
Luiza Erundina, first woman elected mayor of São Paulo, São Paulo, Brazil
Wilma de Faria, first woman elected mayor of Natal, Rio Grande do Norte, Brazil
Eleanor McLaughlin, first woman Lord Provost of Edinburgh, Scotland, United Kingdom
Sophie Masloff, first woman elected mayor of Pittsburgh, Pennsylvania, United States
Meyera E. Oberndorf, first woman elected mayor of Virginia Beach, Virginia, United States
Joyce Trimmer, first woman elected mayor of Scarborough, Ontario, Canada
Rosalia I. Umali, first woman elected Mayor of Calapan, Philippines

1989

Annette Jäger, first female mayor of Essen, Germany
Catherine Trautmann, first woman elected mayor of Strasbourg, France
Jan Reimer, first woman elected mayor of Edmonton, Alberta, Canada
Vicki Buck, first woman elected mayor of Christchurch, New Zealand
Krystyna Nesteruk, first woman elected mayor of Katowice, Poland
Janice Stork, first woman elected mayor of Lancaster, Pennsylvania, United States
Suzie Azar, first woman elected mayor of El Paso, Texas, United States
Martha S. Wood, first woman elected mayor of Winston-Salem, North Carolina, United States
Clementina Ródenas, first woman elected mayor of Valencia, Spain
Marguerite Balenguélé-Zarambaud, first woman mayor of Bangui, Central African Republic

== 1990s ==
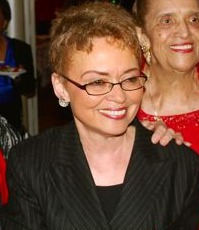
Sharon Pratt Kelly was the first woman mayor of Washington, D.C. (elected in 1990, took office in 1991).

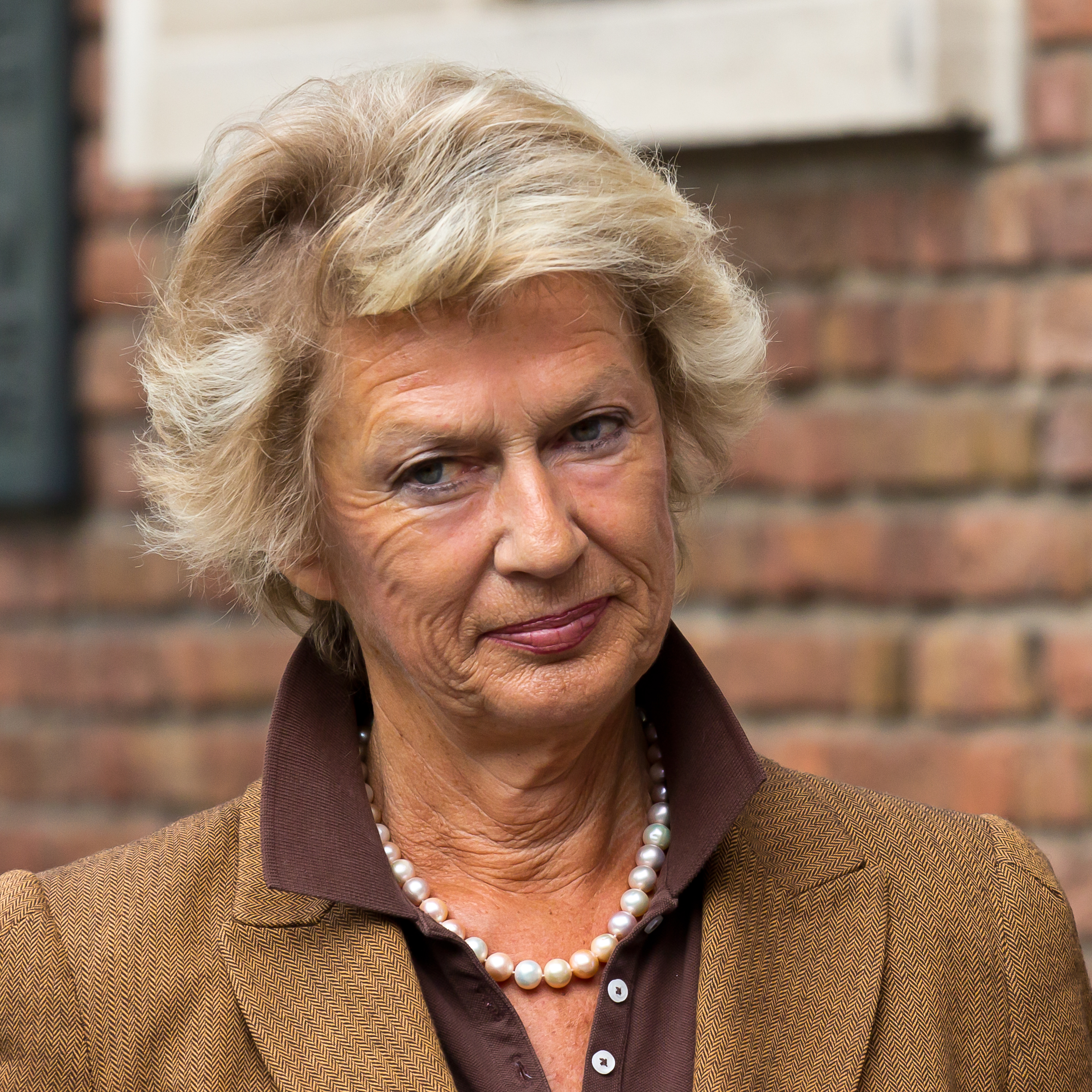
Frankfurt, Germany elected Petra Roth mayor in 1995, making her the first woman to serve the city in that capacity.

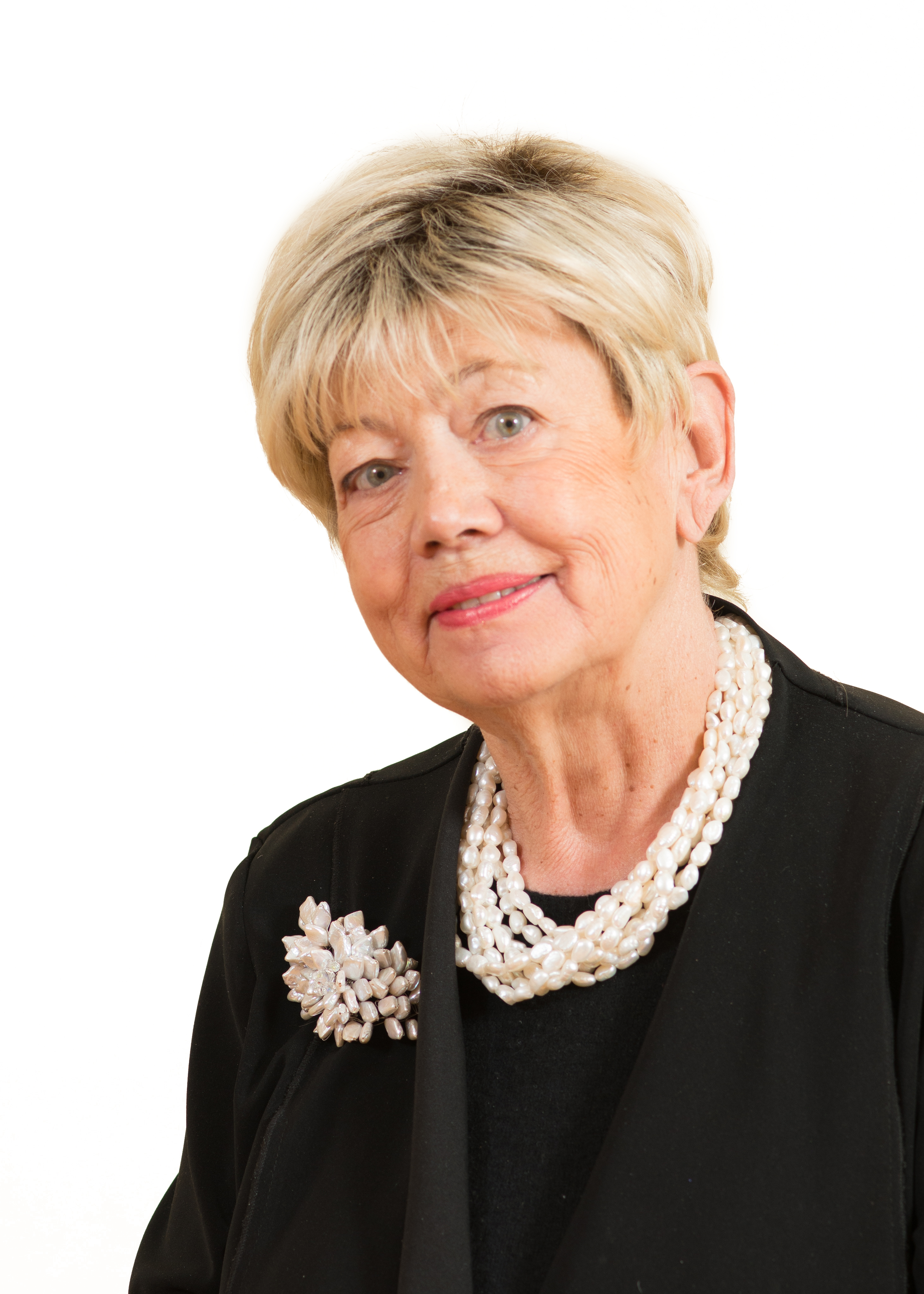
Ivi Eenmaa was the first woman mayor of Tallinn, Estonia, serving from 1997 to 1999.

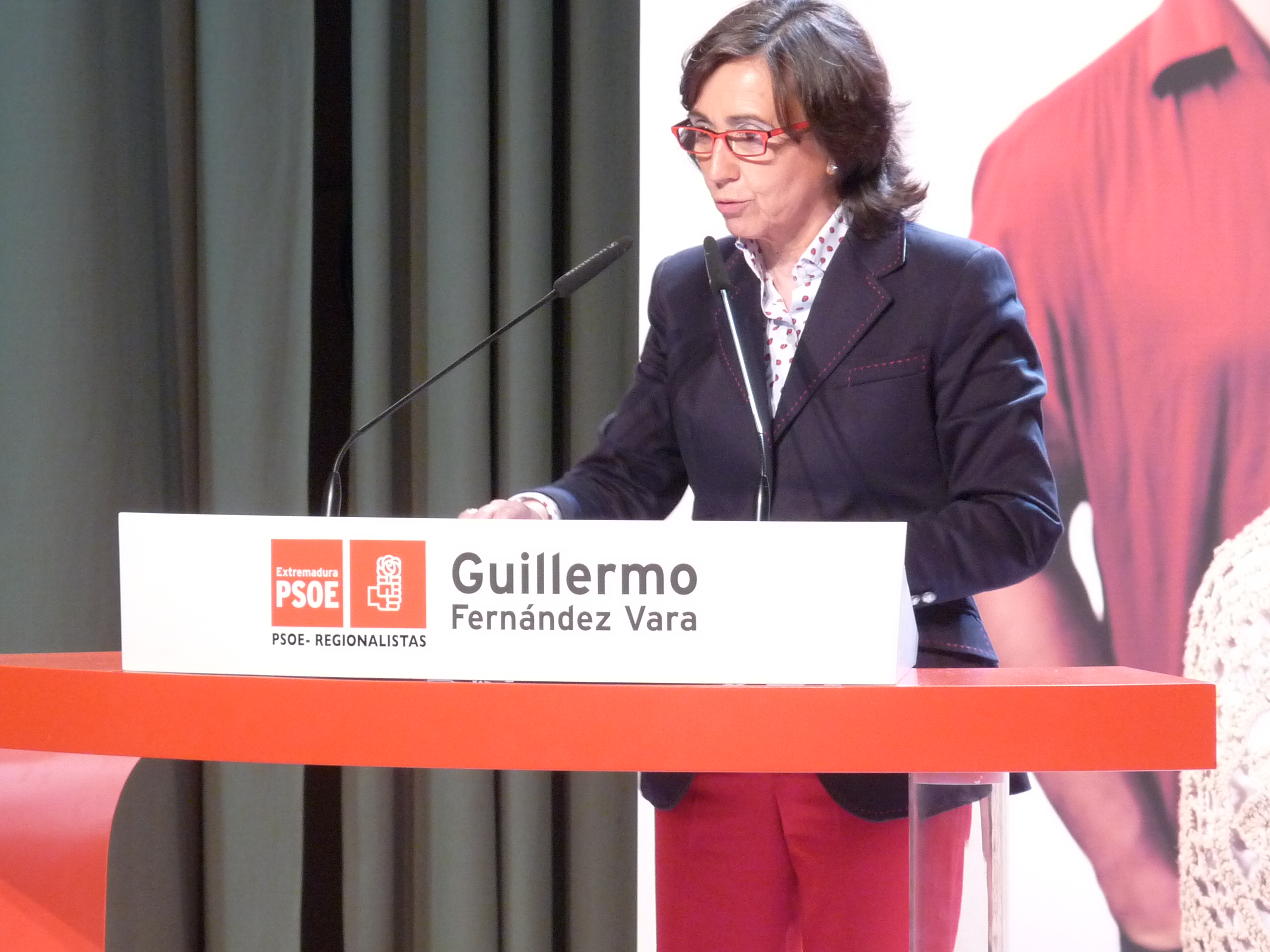
From 1999 to 2009, Rosa Aguilar was the mayor of Córdoba, the first woman in the city's history to serve in that capacity.

1990

Hazel Beard, first woman elected mayor of Shreveport, Louisiana, United States
Franciszka Cegielska first woman elected mayor of Gdynia, Poland
Alice Jempsa, Los Alamitos, California, United States
Rohani Darus Danil first woman mayor of Tebing Tinggi, Indonesia
Marie Bednářová, first woman elected mayor of Kladno, Czech Republic

1991

Cosetta Castagno, first woman elected mayor of Vernon, Utah, United States
Ruth Devenney, first woman mayor of Kiama, New South Wales, Australia
Harue Kitamura, first woman elected mayor of Ashiya, Japan
Moira Leiper Ducharme, first woman elected mayor of Halifax, Nova Scotia, Canada
Linda Lingle, first woman elected mayor of Maui, Hawaii, United States
Sharon Pratt Kelly, first woman elected mayor of the District of Columbia, United States
Ana Rosa Payán, first woman elected mayor of Mérida, Mexico
June Rowlands, first woman elected mayor of Toronto, Ontario, Canada
Kaba Rougui Barry, first woman elected mayor of Matam, Guinea
Susan Weiner, first woman elected mayor of Savannah, Georgia, United States
Elizabeth Brater, first woman elected Mayor of Ann Arbor, Michigan, United States
Joyce Johnson, first woman mayor of Orem, Utah, United States
Mary Kanyha, first woman mayor of Pine Knoll Shores, North Carolina, United States
Maria Marxer, first woman mayor of Gamprin, Liechtenstein, and first woman mayor in the country.

1992

Deedee Corradini, first woman elected mayor of Salt Lake City, Utah, United States
Irene Sáez, first woman elected mayor of Chacao Municipality, Venezuela
Sonia Durán de Infante, first woman in function of mayor of Bogotá, Colombia
Rose Janneire, first woman elected mayor of Arima, Trinidad and Tobago
Jane Robbins, first woman elected mayor of Pine City, Minnesota, United States
Marilyn Roman, first woman to serve as mayor of Jersey City, New Jersey, United States

served as acting mayor for over four months following the removal of her predecessor, Gerald McCann, who was convicted of fraud

Ann-Marit Sæbønes, first woman elected mayor of Oslo Municipality, Norway
M. Susan Savage, first woman elected mayor Tulsa, Oklahoma, United States
Claire Stewart, first woman elected mayor of New Plymouth, New Zealand
Susan Thompson, first woman elected mayor of Winnipeg, Manitoba, Canada
Fran Wilde, first woman elected mayor of Wellington, New Zealand
Cheryll Woods-Flowers, first woman elected mayor of Mount Pleasant, South Carolina, United States
Stella Welsh, first woman elected mayor of Orem, Utah, United States

Welsh defeated Joyce Johnson, the first woman mayor of Orem who was appointed by the city council, in the 1991 general election.

1993

Linda Blogoslawski, first woman elected mayor of New Britain, Connecticut, United States
Eunice Britto, first woman elected mayor Mangalore (Mangaluru), India
Rita Cutajar, first woman mayor of Għasri (Gozo), and also first female mayor in Malta
Slobodanka Gruden, first woman elected mayor of Belgrade, Serbia
Ildikó Asztalos, first woman elected mayor of Miskolc, Hungary
Agnethe Davidsen, first woman elected mayor of Nuuk, Greenland
Ruth Bascom, first woman mayor of Eugene, Oregon, United States
Frances Gibbs, first woman elected mayor of Peekskill, New York.
Anne Jones, first woman elected mayor of Pottstown, Pennsylvania, United States
Sylvia Kerckhoff first woman elected mayor of Durham, North Carolina
Shirley Seney, first woman mayor of Lake Placid, New York, United States
Judy Green, first woman to serve as mayor of Oviedo, Florida, United States
Sharon Sayles Belton, first woman and first African-American elected mayor of Minneapolis, Minnesota, United States
Hana Demlová, first woman elected mayor of Pardubice, Czech Republic
Patsy Jo Hilliard, first woman and first African American mayor of East Point, Georgia, United States

1994

Patricia Candiano, first woman mayor of Asbury Park, New Jersey, United States
Dagmar Lastovecká, first woman elected mayor of Brno, Czech Republic
Marie-Luise Smeets, first woman elected mayor of Düsseldorf, Germany

1995

Muriel Allerton, first woman elected mayor of Fulton, Oswego County, New York, United States
Soledad Becerril, first elected female mayor of Seville, Spain
Ivi Eenmaa, first woman mayor of Tallinn, Estonia
Christine Korff, first woman elected mayor of Port Chester, New York, United States
Lydia Magallon, first woman elected mayor of Escaldes-Engordany, Andorra
Mary Lou Makepeace, first woman mayor of Colorado Springs, Colorado, United States
Bibiana Rossa, first woman elected mayor of Canillo, Andorra
Petra Roth, first woman elected mayor of Frankfurt, Germany
Luisa Fernanda Rudi, first elected female mayor of Zaragoza, Spain
Joan Shafer, first woman elected mayor of Surprise, Arizona, United States
Saroj Singh, first woman elected mayor of Varanasi, India
Sukhi Turner, first woman elected mayor of Dunedin, New Zealand
Celia Villalobos, first elected female mayor of Málaga, Spain
Rosemary Waldorf, first woman elected mayor of Chapel Hill, North Carolina, United States

1996

Alicen Chelaite, first woman elected mayor of Nakuru, Kenya
Margaret Farquhar, first woman elected Lord Provost of Aberdeen, Scotland, United Kingdom
Marina Matulović-Dropulić, first woman in function of mayor of Zagreb, Croatia

(appointed 1996, elected 1997)

Eva-Riitta Siitonen, first woman elected mayor of Helsinki, Finland

1997

Sue Bauman, first woman elected mayor of Madison, Wisconsin, United States
Fay Brennan, first woman elected mayor of Wyong, New South Wales, Australia
Jessica Maes, first woman elected mayor of Huntington Park, California, United States
Joan Wagnon, first woman elected of mayor of Topeka, Kansas, United States
Tokozile Xasa, first woman elected mayor of Amathole District, South Africa

also first woman mayor in Eastern Cape

1998

Maria Clara Lobregat, first woman elected mayor of Zamboanga City, Philippines
Elenita Binay, first woman elected mayor of Makati City, Philippines
Fran Barford, first woman elected mayor of Temple Terrace, Florida, United States

Barford ran unopposed

Roxanne Browning, first woman elected mayor of Northport, New York, United States
Janet Crampsey, first woman mayor of Carrickfergus, Northern Ireland, United Kingdom
Miriam Feirberg, first woman elected mayor of Netanya, Israel
Betty Flores, first woman elected mayor of Laredo, Texas, United States
Yael German, first woman elected mayor of Herzliya, Israel
Diane Mathis, first woman mayor of Tulare, California, United States
Fikile Mtembu, first woman elected mayor of Manzini, Eswatini

also first woman mayor in Swaziland

Maria O'Brien Campbell, first woman mayor of Drogheda, Ireland (Republic of Ireland)
Vilma Santos, first woman elected mayor of Lipa City, Philippines
Sarojini Yogeswaran, first woman elected mayor of Jaffna, Sri Lanka

she was assassinated three months into her term

Molly Mulyahati Djubaedi, first woman mayor of Sukabumi, Indonesia

1999

Rosa Aguilar, first woman elected mayor of Córdoba, Spain
Yolanda Barcina, first woman elected mayor of Pamplona, Spain
Kay Barnes, first woman elected mayor of Kansas City, Missouri, United States
Paz Fernández, first woman elected mayor of Gijón, Spain
Jan Laverty Jones, first woman elected mayor of Las Vegas, Nevada, United States
Patricia Nawa, first woman elected mayor of Lusaka, Zambia
Shirley Robb, first woman elected mayor of Princeton, Indiana, United States
Rosario Robles, first woman appointed Head of Government of the Federal District in Mexico City, Mexico

in Mexico City, "Head of Government of the Federal District" is the equivalent of a mayor.

Theresia Samaria, first woman elected mayor of Walvis Bay, Namibia
Frankie Seaberry, first woman elected mayor of Centerville, Missouri, United States
Jennifer Stultz, first woman elected mayor of Gastonia, North Carolina, United States
Helen Wright, first woman elected Lord Provost of Dundee, Scotland, United Kingdom
Yvonne Thorne, first woman elected mayor of Dorset Council in Tasmania, Australia
Blanca Vela, first woman elected mayor of Brownsville, Texas, United States
Deborah C. Whitcraft, first woman elected mayor of Beach Haven, New Jersey, United States
Sharon J. Bilinski, first woman elected mayor of Pana, Illinois, United States, 1 May 1999

== See also ==
- List of first women governors and chief ministers
- List of first women mayors
- List of first women mayors (18th and 19th centuries)
- List of first women mayors (21st century)
- List of first women mayors in the United States
- List of the first women holders of political offices
- Women in government
