= Soleki Yusufeli =

Soleki (Georgian: სოლეკი) or Sollek was a vanished settlement in the historical Tao region, within the boundaries of the present-day Kılıçkaya (formerly Ersis) village in the Yusufeli District of Artvin Province in Turkey. All that remains of this village are the ruins of a castle and agricultural land.

== History ==
Soleki is mentioned in early Ottoman registers as "Solporek" (صولپورك) or "Solborek" (صولبورك). Over time, it took the forms Solek, Sollek, and Söllek.

Soleki was located in Tao, one of the regions forming the western part of Georgia during the Middle Ages. Indeed, the Ottomans captured this region from the Georgians after the Georgian campaign of 1549. The ruined walls of Soleki Castle, which fell into Ottoman hands along with Pertekrek (Peterek) and Nikhakhi castles during this campaign, have survived to the present day.

In the 1574 land-survey register (mufassal defter) of the Ottoman administration, the village of Soleki or Söllek was one of the villages of the Pertekrek district (nahiye) of the Tortum sanjak, under the name "Solporek" or "Solborek". The village had a population of 20 or 27 households. In 1555, 16 households were registered in the village.

Soleki or Söllek is not mentioned as a village in later Ottoman registers. Significant rice cultivation was carried out in the area known as "Söllek Vineyards" on the banks of the Çoruh River. However, with the construction of the Yusufeli Dam, rice cultivation in the Söllek vineyards became impossible. In the Söllek region, the Aros Plateau Festival is held every year in July in the Aros area, which is located within the forested area.

Soleki Castle, also known as Kajeti Castle (ქაჯეთის ციხე) or Sollek Castle, is the only historical structure remaining from the village of Soleki or Söllek. The castle is located on a rock on the right bank of the Çoruh River. The height of its surviving walls reaches 2 meters.
