= Jean Robinson =

British mayor

Jean Robinson CBE
- Born: 8 December 1889; Ashton-under-Lyne, England
- Died: 5 November 1987 (aged 97)

Jean Robinson CBE JP (8 December 1899 – 5 November 1987) was the first female mayor of Blackpool, Lancashire, serving from 1968 to 1969, after having been a member of the town council for 14 years.

Born in Ashton-under-Lyne, Robinson's mother died in 1907, and her father left in 1909, leaving the children to look after themselves. At the age of 12, Robinson began working in a cotton mill, later becoming a weaver. In 1934, due to unemployment, she moved with her husband to Blackpool. There, they set up a stall in the Abingdon Street Market, and Robinson devoted her spare time to the Labour Party and the co-operative movement. She also became active in the Workers' Educational Association, and in the Soroptimist movement.

Robinson was elected to Blackpool Town Council in 1954, and in 1968 she became the first woman to serve as Mayor of Blackpool. During her year in office, she gave the welcome address at the Trades Union Congress, and both the Labour and Conservative Party Conferences which were all held in the town in 1968.

Following the end of her term of office, Robinson was appointed as a Commander of the Order of the British Empire. She later studied for O levels and A levels at college. In 2020, a plaque commemorating her was erected at the market.

== See also ==
- List of first women mayors (20th century)
