= Sadiye Hanım =

Turkish politician

Sadiye Hanim

Mayor of Kılıçkaya
- In office 1930–1932

Sadiye Hanim (1897–1951), was a Turkish politician. She was the Mayor of Kılıçkaya in Turkey (1930–1932) and she was the first woman mayor in Turkey.
