= Rohana Muthalib =

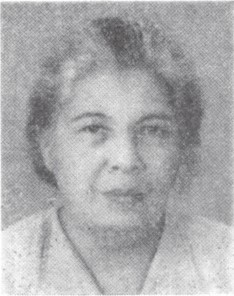
- Official portrait, c. 1958

Mayor of Pontianak
- In office 1952–1956
- Governor: Moerdjani; Mas Subarjo; RTA Milono
- Preceded by: A.D.S. Hidayat
- Succeeded by: Soemartoyo

Personal details
- Born: 29 April 1900 Solok, West Sumatra, Dutch East Indies
- Died: 7 April 1983 (aged 82) Jakarta, Indonesia
- Spouse: Abdul Muthalib
- Children: 5
- Occupation: Beautician

Rohana Muthalib (29 April 1900 — 7 April 1983) was an Indonesian beautician who served as the third mayor of Pontianak from 1952 to 1956.

== Early and personal life ==
Muthalib was born on 29 April 1900 in Baso, Solok, as the youngest child and daughter of the two children of Djamin Datuk Mangkuto Sati (1879–1951), an assistant to the Baso sub-district head, and Siti Sawiyah (1879–1959) of Minangkabau descent. She had a brother, Noermattias Datuk Bagindo Sati (1896–1987), the father of Kris Noermatias who served as the ambassador of Indonesia to Germany from 1982 to 1985. Muthalib's maternal great-grandfather was Mahmoed from Balingka. She was of Minangkabau descent.

She was married to Abdul Muthalib, an architect. They had four sons, Abdullah Idwan (1918–1975), Edwin (1920–1991), Ahmed (1924–1993), a musical artist, and Barmansyah "Basye" Latief Muthalib (1942–2004), and a daughter Erna Fatma Muthalib (1922–1988), later known as Nani Razak who became a famous lawyer in Jakarta and was the first Indonesian female lawyer.

Muthalib lived in Bandung after retirement. Since 1978, she underwent several treatments in the hospital due to complications. Muthalib died in Jakarta, Indonesia, on 7 April 1983 at 23:00 WIB at the age of 82. She was buried at Blender Cemetery, a public cemetery in Bogor.

== Career ==
Prior to her appointment as the Mayor of Pontianak, Muthalib worked as a beautician. She graduated with a cosmetology degree from the Cor van der Leeuw Institute. Muthalib became the first Indonesian to become a cosmetologist after her graduation.

She was appointed as the Mayor of Pontianak by the Minister of Internal Affairs Mohammad Roem in 1952. Muthalib was one of the two female mayors appointed during Roem's term. She was the first female to serve as the mayor of Pontianak and was succeeded by Augustine Magdalena Waworuntu as the mayor of Manado. Muthalib served for four years until 1956. She was credited by Roem for fixing "minor but important" problems in the city, such as garbage problems and potholes. On one occasion, Muthalib was reported to have spent 250 thousand rupiahs for the extension of eight main roads in the city, reparation of bridges and improvement of pavements.

During her term, she faced protests from trade unions affiliated with the Central All-Indonesian Workers Organization. The trade unions demanded a raise. However — as Roem described it — Muthalib handled the protesters "like her own children" and managed to subdue the demand.

In 1954, she held the city's first press exhibition. The exhibition, which was organized by the Pembangunan newspaper which was owned by the brothers Aliaswat and Ibrahim Saleh, displayed thousands of daily publications and magazines.

At the end of her term — between 1955 and 1956 — Muthalib embarked on a program to provide the city with clean water.

After her resignation from the mayoral office, she stated that "It is easier to sit in a beauty salon than to sit as a mayor."

The main hall at the Pontianak City Development Planning Agency is named after Muthalib.
