= Marie Madoé Sivomey =

Togolese politician (1923–2008)

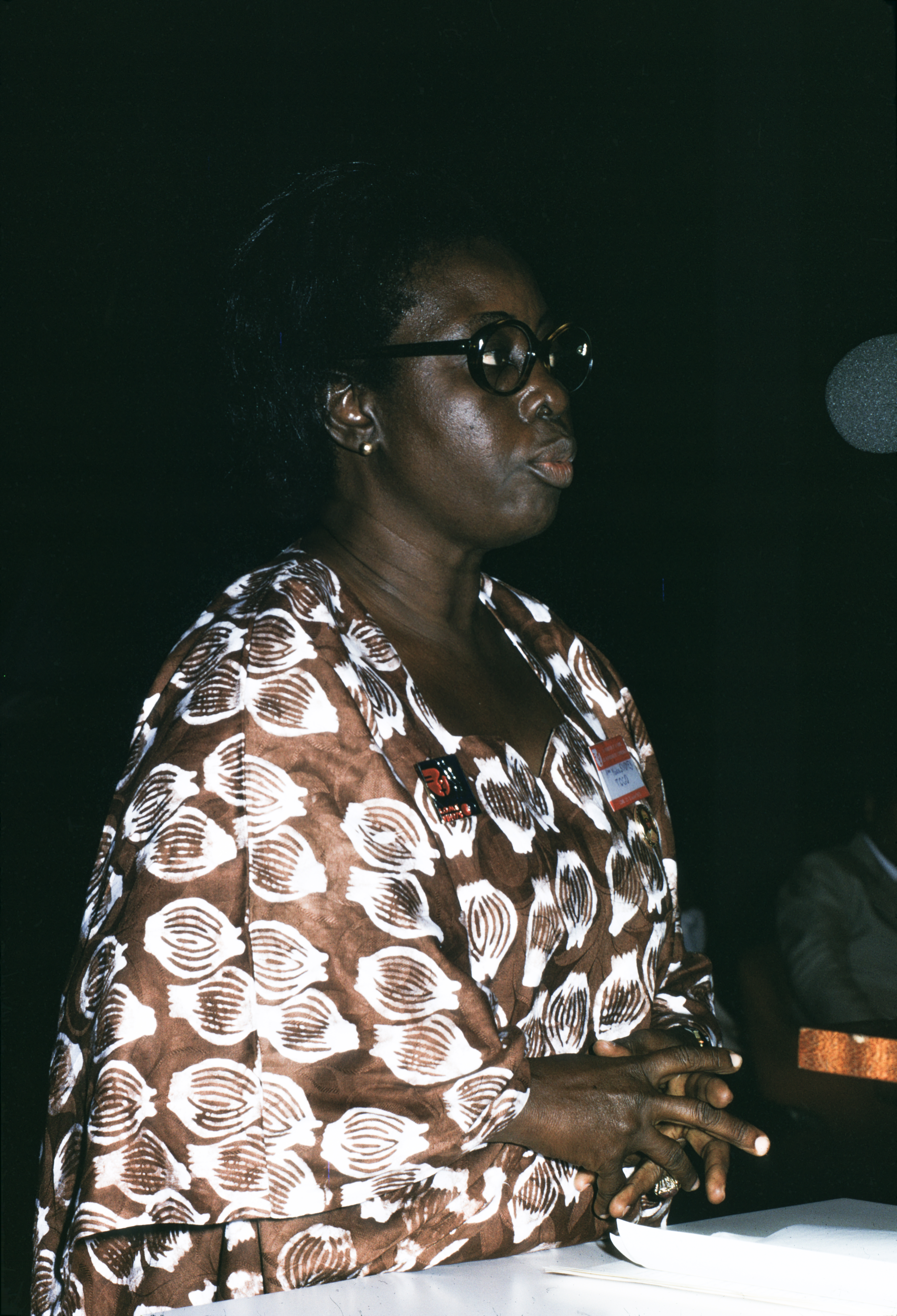
- Marie Madoé Sivomey in 1975

Mayor of Lomé
- In office July 24, 1967 – May 17, 1974

Personal details
- Born: Marie Madoé Gbikpi–Benissan; July 3, 1923 Aného, Togo
- Died: September 15, 2008 (aged 85)

Marie Madoé Sivomey (July 3, 1923 – September 15, 2008), born Marie Madoé Gbikpi–Benissan, was a Togolese politician who was the first woman to serve as a mayor in Togo, overseeing the capital, Lomé, from 1967 to 1974.

== Early life and education ==
She was born in 1923 in a Christian family in Aného, a town in southeastern Togo's Maritime region, the spiritual center of the Guin-Mina people. Her brother, Jean Kuassi Gbikpi, would later become archbishop of Lomé.

After beginning her primary studies in Aného, she graduated in Porto-Novo, Benin. She then attended the Cours Complémentaire in Lomé.

== Career as civil servant ==
Sivomey was hired by the French colonial administration as a civil servant, working in the Finance Department from 1940 to 1945. She continued this Finance Department work under the framework of French West Africa from 1945 until 1953, including in the Direct Tax Department of the city of Bobo-Dioulasso, in what is now Burkina Faso.

She returned permanently to Togo, which gained independence from France in 1960, and supported the leadership of the country's Direct Tax Department from 1960 to 1962. She then worked as chief administrative secretary and then director of social affairs starting in 1963. At the same time, she represented Togo at various symposiums and congresses, and in 1961 she became the first Togolese woman to participate in a session of the United Nations General Assembly.

It was in this period that she also helped organize L'Union des Femmes du Togo (UFEMTO), the Union of Togolese Women, alongside Marguerite Adjoavi Thompson-Trénou and other women activists.

== Mayor of Lomé ==
Following the January 1967 Togolese coup d'état and the ascent to power of President Gnassingbé Eyadéma, all the country's elected bodies were dissolved, political parties were banned, and the administration of Togo's communes fell to délégations spéciales, or special delegations. In this fraught context, Marie Madoé Sivomey was designated mayor of Lomé on July 24, 1967, based on her extensive experience as a civil servant.

"Among the potential candidates for the post of mayor, I was the most experienced in the workings of the administration, having previously overseen social services," she later said.

She held the position until May 17, 1974.

== Later years ==
In her retirement, Sivomey lived in Lom-Nava. She was heavily involved in her local parish, as a deeply religious woman who was at times criticized by the country's youth for her moralizing stances. She also continued to advocate on behalf of Togolese women, particularly in support of women's education.

She died on September 15, 2008, in Lomé.
