= Marguerite Pétro-Koni-Zezé =

Central African politician

Minister of Social Affairs, National Solidarity and Gender Promotion
- In office 22 April 2011 – 3 February 2013
- President: François Bozizé
- Prime Minister: Faustin-Archange Touadéra
- Preceded by: Bernadette Say
- Succeeded by: Marie-Madeleine Moussa Yadouma

Mayor of Bangui
- In office 24 April 1989 – 1992
- Preceded by: Etienne Ogbalet
- Succeeded by: Raymond Behorou

Personal details
- Born: 19 July 1948 (age 77) Mobaye, Ubangi-Shari (now the present-day Central African Republic)
- Party: RDC

Marguerite Pétro-Koni-Zezé (formerly Balenguélé-Zarambaud; born 19 July 1948) is a Central African politician who served as the first female mayor of Bangui from 1989 to 1992.

== Early life and education ==
Marguerite Zarambaud was born in Mobaye on 19 July 1948. In the 1970s, she studied law at the University of Caen and married Abel Balenguélé. Afterwards, she replaced her name with Marguerite Balenguélé-Zarambaud.

== Career ==
Zarambaud went back to Bangui and got involved in politics. On 22 August 1977, she was arrested for distributing Central African Student Union flyers that referred to the country as a republic instead of an empire. She was sentenced to 10 years imprisonment and put under house arrest due to five-month pregnancy.

Upon the fall of the Bokassa regime, she was released from home arrest and worked at the Central African Republic's customs service. She then joined RDC party. In May 1988, she ran for the Bangui Municipal election and won a seat in the city council. She was later appointed as the first deputy mayor and later served as the mayor of Bangui from 24 April 1989 to 1992 after the dismissal of Etienne Ogbalet.

Zarambaud ran for the 1998 election representing Mobaye's first district and won a seat at National Assembly. As an MP, she joined the Committee on the Interior, Laws and Administrative Affairs. On 29 May 2003, she was chosen as a member of National Transitional Council from the customs office and took part in the National Dialogue in Bangui. In the 2005 election, she was re-elected as a member of the parliament from Mobaye First District.

Following the death of Andre Kolingba in 2010, RDC faced internal conflict. Koni-Zezé responded to it by joining the breakaway faction, RDC Mouvance Grand-K, on 20 November 2010 and became the leader of it. She participated in the 2011 election and did not gain a seat in the parliament. Nevertheless, Bozize appointed her as the Minister of Social Affairs, National Solidarity, and Gender Promotion from 22 April 2011 to 3 February 2013.

As a Minister of Social affairs, Koni-Zezé endorsed the project of Women's Entrepreneurship in the Central African Republic organized by NGO "PlaNet Finance".

== Personal life ==
Zarambaud changed her name to Pétro-Koni-Zezé and belongs to Yakoma.
