= Rohani Darus Danil =

Sumatran politician (born 1939)

Hajjah Rohani Darus Danil S.H.
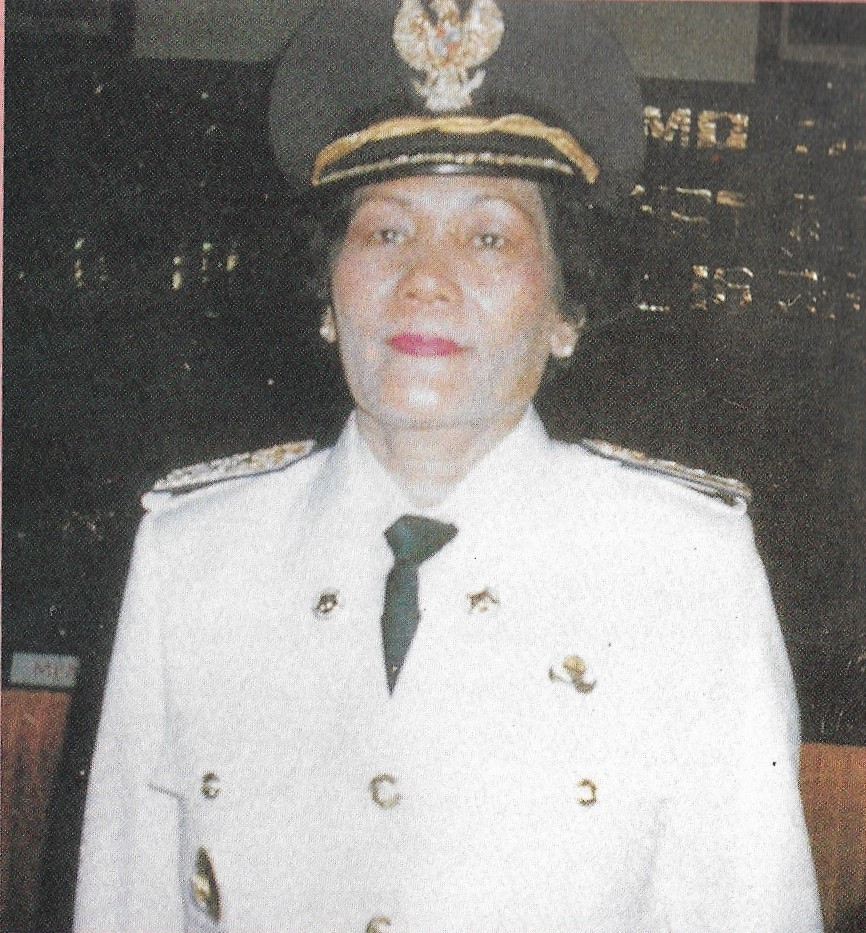

Mayor of Tebing Tinggi
- In office 16 July 1990 – 24 July 2000
- Preceded by: Rupai Perangin-Angin
- Succeeded by: Abdul Hafiz Hasibuan
- Majority: 78% – 1990; 90% – 1995

Personal details
- Born: 26 June 1939 (age 86) Tanjungpura, Sultanate of Langkat, Dutch East Indies
- Political party: Golkar
- Spouse: Danil Achmad

Hajjah Rohani Darus Danil, S.H. (born 26 June 1939) is a former Sumatran Malay politician who became the first female mayor of Tebing Tinggi and the province of North Sumatra.

After graduating from the Gadjah Mada University, Danil began her career as a civil servant. She was elected Mayor of Tebingtinggi in 1990, and re-elected for a second term in 1995. She was credited for doubling the per-capita income and the regional income in her term. For her efforts to develop Tebingtinggi, she was nominated in 1998 as the Governor of North Sumatra.

== Early life and education ==
Rohani Darus Danil was born on 26 June 1939 in Tanjung Pura, Sultanate of Langkat (now Langkat Regency). She was the thirteenth child of Orang Kaja Muhammad Darus Umar and Salamah. She began her studies at the Sekolah Rakyat (People's School) in Hitam, graduating in 1953, then continued her studies at the Sekolah Menegah Pertama (Junior High School) in Jentera, Tanjung Pura. She then moved to Medan and entered the Sekolah Menegah Atas (high school) in Jalan Jati, graduating in 1960.

To pursue her college education, Danil moved to Yogyakarta, and studied at the Law Faculty of the Gadjah Mada University. She graduated from the university in 1966.

== Career ==
After graduation, Danil was employed in the Langkat Regency as the Head of the Law Bureau and Head of the Economic Bureau. She was promoted to Regional Secretary of Langkat Regency some time later. Due to her proficiency at her job, the Governor of North Sumatra at that time, Raja Inal Siregar, appointed her as the Head of the Law Bureau in the Office of the Governor of North Sumatra.

== Mayor of Tebingtinggi ==
=== Nomination and election ===
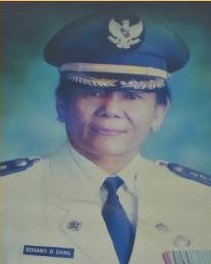
Official portrait of Rohani Darus Danil as the Mayor of Tebingtinggi.

In 1990, Siregar, the Governor of North Sumatra, nominated Danil as the candidate for the Mayor of Tebingtinggi. For the position, she competed against Rizal Alam (Head of the Public Works Bureau) and Makmur Saleh Pasaribu (Head of Inspectorate). At the election for the mayor held on 21 June 1990, Danil won by an absolute majority, obtaining 14 out of 18 votes.

Danil was inaugurated as mayor on 16 July 1990 by Rudini, the Minister of Internal Affairs at the time. Her inauguration was unusual, as only governors could be inaugurated by the Minister of Internal Affairs, while regents and mayors were inaugurated by the governor. To this, Rudini replied that "...I inaugurated (her)...to show how much I respected women". (Note: Original translation: ...saya melantik...untuk menunjukkan betapa saya menghargai wanita.)

At the election held in June 1995, Danil won again, this time with 18 out of 20 votes cast for her. Danil was inaugurated on 24 July 1995 by Siregar himself.

=== Activities ===
According to Danil, she delegates most of her administrative tasks to the city secretary, Achyar. She was more often seen traversing Tebingtinggi and held dialogues with the Tebingtinggi populace. Every Friday, she frequently joined wirids (religious meetups) in local communities. In an interview, she stated that she spent a minimum of two hours each day meeting the Tebingtinggi populace.

Danil's focus during her term was on improving the conditions for small private enterprises, as she believed that sector has the largest workforce. She managed to increase the number of enterprises from 1,130 units in the year 1993-1994, to 1,246 units in 1995-1996, and the absorbed workforce from 12,967 people to 14,978.

According to Achyar, the improvement of small private enterprises impacted the economy of Tebingtinggi. Danil managed to double the per-capita income of Tebingtinggi in her two terms, and managed to doubled the regional income in just her first term.

Among her efforts were the expansion of the territory of Tebingtinggi and the enactment of a regional law on cleanliness, which became the first environmental law in the city in 20 years.

=== Achievements ===
During Danil's term, the city of Tebingtinggi received the "Adipura" award three times (1994, 1995, 1996) due to its success in maintaining cleanliness and management of the urban environment.

=== Nomination as Governor of North Sumatra ===
At the end of her term, in 1998, Danil was nominated by the Kosgoro Women of Tebingtinggi as a possible candidate for the Governor of North Sumatra.

== Later life ==
At the 2004 Indonesian legislative election, Danil nominated herself as the member of the Regional Representative Council, number 47. Danil went in the 9th place and obtained 167,998 votes in the election. She did not win any seats in the election.

== Personal life ==
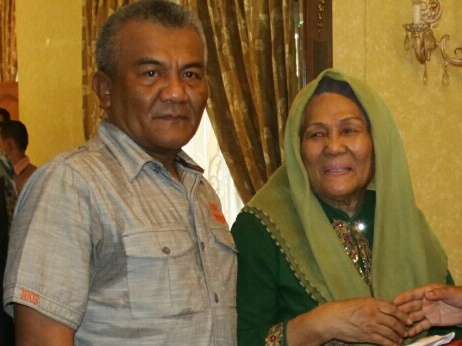
Danil with one of her sons, Gustian Danil.

Danil married Danil Ahmad, a lecturer at the Literature Faculty of the University of North Sumatra. The marriage resulted in three children.

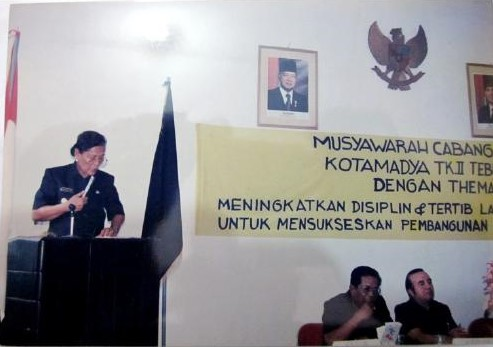
Danil (far left) in a meeting.

== Awards ==
=== Medals ===
Satyalancana Karya Satya, 2nd Class (1994)
Satyalancana Wirakarya (1996)

=== Titles ===
- Pengelola Kebersihan Kota (City Cleanliness Manager) (1992, 1993) from the Minister of Internal Affairs and Minister of the Environment
- Pembina Perumahan dan Pemukiman (Patron of Housing and Settlements) (1995) from the Minister of People's Housing.
- Tokoh Wanita Indonesia (Indonesian Woman's Figure) (1990) from the Indonesian Women Congress,
- The Best Executive of the Year (1995) from International Management Indonesia
- 21 Wanita Kartini Indonesia (21 Kartini Women of Indonesia) (1993)

== Bibliography ==
- Rahmadhani, Wahyu (2016), PERANAN Hj. ROHANI DARUS DANIL TERHADAP PEMBANGUNAN KOTA TEBING TINGGI (1990-2000) (in Indonesian), Medan: UNIMED
- Al-Balga, Ramdhy; Zulfi, Ade; Sopian, M. (2013), 96 tahun Tebingtinggi: Menjawab Tantangan Menuju Kemandirian, Tebingtinggi
