= Mary Peterson =

American politician (1885 – 1973)

Mary Peterson (1885–1973; later Mary Peterson Arnold) was an American politician. She was the mayor of Red Cloud, Nebraska from 1921 to her resignation in 1926, and the first woman mayor of any town in the state.

== Early life ==
Mary Peterson was born in Bellaire, Kansas, in 1885, and moved in her childhood to Red Cloud, Nebraska. She helped managed parts of her father's business.

== Career ==
She was a partial owner of an ice plant in the town prior to her election as mayor.

In 1921, at the age of 35, and just one year after women had won the right to vote, she was elected mayor of Red Cloud. While preliminary results had shown that she lost to her opponent, Alf McCall, there were miscounted votes: She had won by seven votes. For years prior, Red Cloud had a succession of male mayors who had accumulated high debt for the town; Peterson was selected to change their spending, and her campaign used a slogan to demonstrate her focus on reducing the debt amassed.

She was elected three times, becoming the first woman mayor in the state. She paid down the debts of the city during her terms in office (some $90,000 at the time), as well as increased municipal workers' pay and expanded the town's resources, such as water treatment facilities and power plants.

She resigned to marry Fred C. Arnold in 1926, renaming herself Mary Arnold. The residents of the town appreciated her services so much that they bought her a new car after her resignation.

== Later life and death ==
She died in 1973 at the age of 88.
