= Sarita Baracat =

Brazilian politician (1930–2017)

Sarita Baracat in 2022

Sarita Baracat de Arruda (29 December 1930 – 9 October 2017) was a Brazilian politician. She served as mayor of Várzea Grande, Mato Grosso, from 1967 to 1970, and then as a member of the Legislative Assembly of Mato Grosso beginning in 1978. She was the first woman to serve in either capacity.

== Early life ==
Sarita Baracat de Arruda was born in Várzea Grande, Mato Grosso, on 29 December 1930. Her parents, Miguel Baracat and Warda Zain, were born in Syria and met in Buenos Aires, Argentina. She was one of eight children.

Baracat attended the Escola Estadual Liceu Cuiabano in the 1940s. As she lived in Várzea Grande, she had to take a boat across the Cuiabá River to reach the school. She studied to become a teacher. Baracat began working as a treasurer for the city of Várzea Grande when she was twenty years old. She became a history and geography teacher at twenty-two.

== Political career ==
Baracat was elected city councilor in 1957, and she later became president of the city's branch of the National Renewal Alliance. When the party's mayoral candidate dropped out in 1966, Baracat's position as party president led to her becoming the replacement nominee. She was elected mayor, making her the city's first female mayor and the second overall female mayor in the state of Mato Grosso. Her term began in 1967. Baracat sought to incentivize businesses to come to Várzea Grande while she way mayor by offering land and tax exemptions. Her term ended in 1970.

As a member of Brazilian Democratic Movement, Baracat was elected to the Legislative Assembly of Mato Grosso in 1978, where she was the first female member. Baracat also served as secretary of state for education and secretary of the state general audit office, and she was president of the Mato Grosso branch of the Brazilian Democratic Movement.

== Personal life ==
Baracat married Emanuel Benedito de Arruda in 1960. The couple had two sons: legislator Nico Baracat and journalist Fernando Baracat. Nico died in 2012. Baracat's grandson, Kalil Baracat, later served as mayor of Várzea Grande.

Baracat founded the Escola Agrícola de Mato Grosso (transl. Agricultural School of Mato Grosso) and served as its inaugural director. She supported the football team CE Operário Várzea-Grandense and advocated for them while she was mayor.

Baracat died of cardiac arrest on 9 October 2017.

== Legacy ==
Baracat is lauded by supporters as an early example for women's participation in Brazilian politics. She defied societal norms for women at the time, wearing pants and smoking cigarettes while in office. Baracat expressed the belief that more women in politics would be beneficial throughout the world.

Baracat was honored at the Sarita Baracat Auditorium during the Casa Cor Mato Grosso 2002 architecture event. She was the subject of an episode of Tipos Mato-Grossenses.
