= Matilde Pérez Mollá =

Matilde Pérez Mollá (1858 - 1936) was the first woman mayor in Spain. She served as mayor of Quatretondeta between 27 October 1924 and 1 January 1930.

Matilde Pérez Mollá was born in Quatretondeta, Alicante. She held office under the governor of Alicante, General Cristino Bermúdez de Castro under the dictatorship of Primo de Rivera. She was the first women mayor to hold office, however, the first woman to have been elected to the office of mayor was María Domínguez Remón, who was elected mayor of Gallur 28 July 1932. She modernized the city of her office, installed electricity and build a road to connect it with the neighboring Gorga.

== Legacy ==
Matilde Pérez Mollá is regarded as a pioneer in women's politics in Spain.

In 2004 mayor Maria Magdalena Childe, named a street after her and inaugurated a plaque to her honor on the building of her birth.
