= Augustine Magdalena Waworuntu =

Indonesian politician

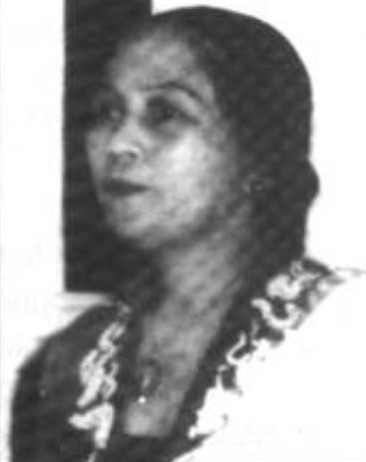

Mayor of Manado
- In office 30 September 1950 – 29 March 1951
- Preceded by: E.R.S. Warouw
- Succeeded by: Hendrik Reingardt Ticoalu

Personal details
- Born: 4 June 1899; Manado, Dutch East Indies
- Died: 21 November 1987 (aged 88)

Augustine Magdalena Waworuntu (4 June 1899 – 21 November 1987), was an Indonesian politician who became the first post-federal Indonesian mayor of Manado and the first female mayor of Manado.

== Early life ==
Waworuntu was born on 4 June 1899 as the daughter of Albertus Lasut Waworuntu, a member of the Volksraad. She began to studied at the Sekolah Rendah (Elementary School) in Manado, then at the age of 14, she moved to Batavia and lived in a monastery. She continued to study at the Hoogere Burgerschool (Junior High School), and in 1917, she was the first Indonesian woman to held a certificate for teaching the French language. During her period in Jakarta, she participated in the Youth Pledge.

During the Japanese occupation of the Dutch East Indies, she became the member of the Committee for Forming Scientific Terms in the Indonesian Language, alongside prominent figures such as Sutan Takdir Alisjahbana. After the Proclamation of Indonesian Independence, she began to teach French and German in high schools.

== Mayor of Manado ==
At the end of 1949, there was an election held to elect the new acting Mayor of Manado. Waworuntu was elected as the acting mayor of Manado, and on 30 September 1950, she was inaugurated as the acting Mayor of Manado. She remarked that the main problem facing Manado was post-war reconstruction and handling of ex-KNIL members. She also stated that in the past five years, only five new government houses had been completed, and her official residence as a mayor was a hotel made of bamboo.

On 13 March 1951, Waworuntu was officially appointed by the Ministry of Internal Affairs as the mayor of Manado. Her appointment was revoked by the Minahasa Council on 29 March 1951, and the body that initially elected her, the Manado City Council, was frozen. A new mayor, H.R. Ticoalu, was appointed to replace her position.

The revocation of her appointment caused conflict between the Ministry of Internal Affairs and the Minahasa Council. The Ministry of Internal Affairs stated that in accordance to the decree dated 6 November 1930, the Minahasa Council only had the right to organize an election, while the Speaker of the People's Representative Council, in favor of the Minahasa Council, stated that Waworuntu's appointment violated the Law of the State of East Indonesia No. 44 of 1950 which was still in effect in Minahasa.

Waworuntu intended to come to Jakarta to ask the Ministry of Internal Affairs about this matter, but she was put under house arrest by the military police in Manado. She was finally released, and managed to get to Jakarta on 8 April 1951.

The conflict between the Ministry of Internal Affairs and the Minahasa Council finally ended on 10 May 1951 when the ministry released a decree that officially revoked the previous appointment. On 25 May 1951, Waworuntu sent a letter to the ministry appealing her dismissal as the mayor of Manado.

Waworuntu's dismissal was also addressed by the Deputy Speaker of the People's Representative Council, Arudji Kartawinata at a session of the council on 2 June 1951. Kartawinata stated that after her dismissal as the mayor of Manado, the Pikiran Rakyat newspaper was warned by the Minahasa government for publishing an article about Waworuntu.

== Death ==
Waworuntu died on 21 November 1987. She was buried in Matani, Tumpaan, South Minahasa.
