= Kılıçkaya =

Kılıçkaya Ersis
- Village
- Location within Turkey
- Coordinates: 40°43′N 41°29′E
- Country: Turkey
- Province: Artvin
- District: Yusufeli
- Elevation: 1,200 m (3,900 ft)
- Time zone: UTC+3 (TRT)
- Postal code: 08820
- Area code: 0466

Kılıçkaya (formerly: Ersis) is a village in the Yusufeli District, Artvin Province, Turkey. Its population is 806 (2021). At 22 kilometres (14 mi) south of Yusufeli it is one of the southernmost settlements of the province. Before the 2013 reorganisation, it was a town (belde).

In 1547, the town was incorporated into Ottoman Empire. After Russian occupation following the Russo-Turkish War (1877-1878) Kılıçkaya was returned to Turkey. In 1930, Sadiye Hanım became the mayor of the town as one of the first female town mayors of Turkey.
