= List of first women mayors (21st century) =

The following is a list of the first woman to serve as mayor of their respective municipalities.

== 2000s ==
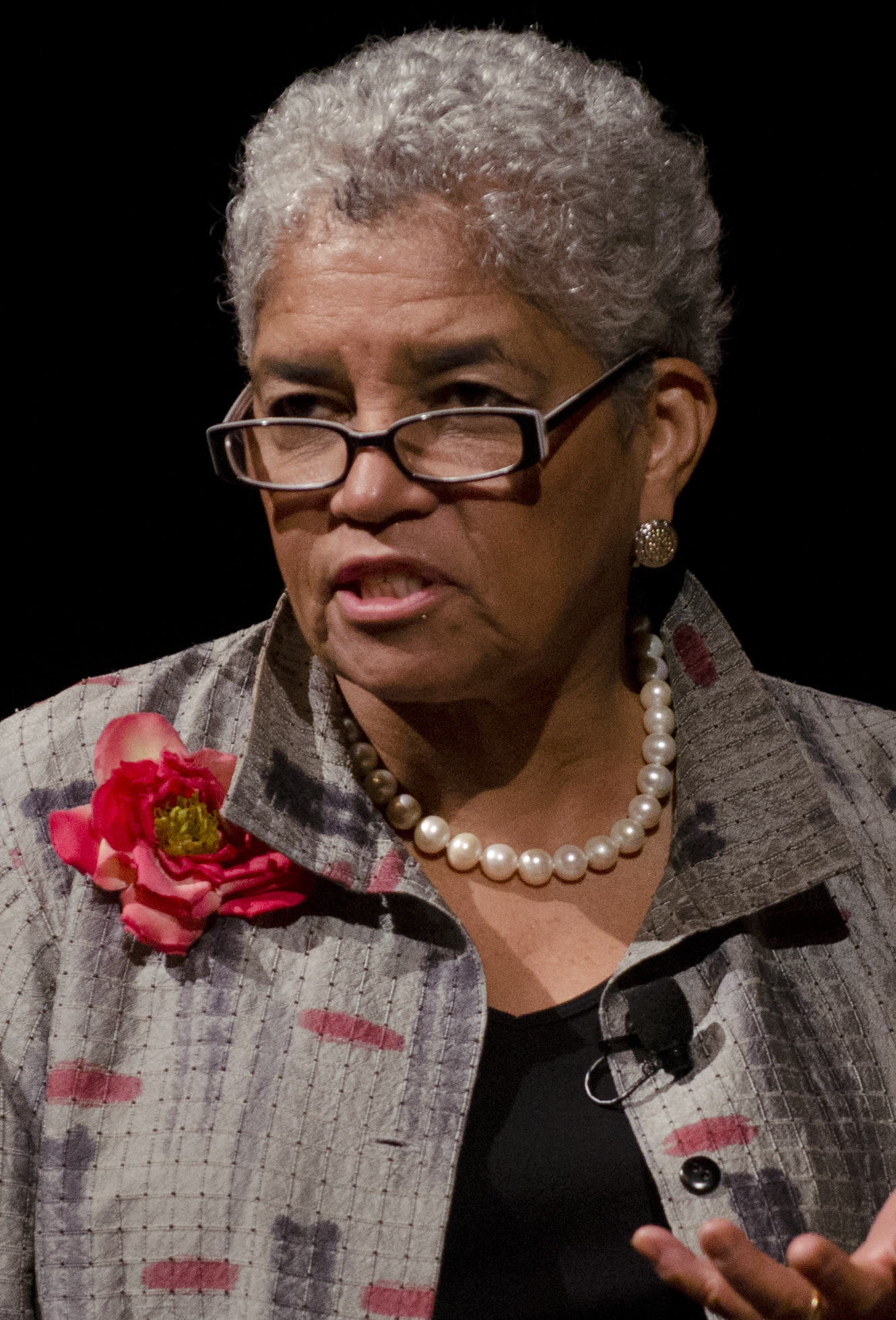
In 2002, Shirley Franklin became the first woman to assume the office of Mayor of Atlanta, United States.

2000

Lore Christopher, first woman elected mayor of Keizer, Oregon, United States
Alison Grosse first woman elected mayor of the Shire of Maroochy, Queensland, Australia

2001

Izalene Tiene, first woman elected mayor of Campinas, Brazil
Yvonne Brown, first black woman elected mayor of Tchula, Mississippi, United States

first black Republican woman elected mayor in the state of Mississippi

Martine Aubry, first woman elected mayor of Lille, France
Berta Cabral, first woman elected mayor of Ponta Delgada, Azores, Portugal
Lauren Fortmiller, first woman elected mayor of Sag Harbor, New York, United States

also the first lesbian mayor of Sag Harbor

Rhine McLin, first woman elected mayor of Dayton, Ohio, United States
Shirley Franklin, first woman and black woman elected mayor of Atlanta, Georgia, United States
Jane Leaver, first woman elected mayor of Medina, Ohio, United States
Ellen O. Moyer, first woman elected mayor of Annapolis, Maryland, United States
Dubravka Šuica, first woman elected mayor of Dubrovnik, Croatia
Rosa Russo Iervolino, first woman elected mayor of Naples, Italy
Ophelia Hoff Saytumah, first woman elected mayor of Monrovia, Liberia
Sandra Strader, first woman elected mayor of Tupper Lake, New York, United States

2002

Dora Bakoyannis, first woman elected mayor of Athens, Greece
Annika Billström, first woman elected mayor of Stockholm, Sweden
Jane L. Campbell, first woman elected mayor of Cleveland, Ohio, United States
Brigitte Fouré, first woman elected mayor of Amiens, France
Sekesai Makwavarara, first woman deputy mayor of Harare, Zimbabwe
Nancy Merse, first woman mayor of Edgewater, New Jersey, United States
Danica Simšič, first woman elected mayor of Ljubljana, Slovenia
Hilde Zach, first woman elected mayor of Innsbruck, Austria
Lou Ann Christensen, first woman elected mayor of Brigham City, Utah, United States
Milada Halíková, first woman elected mayor of Havířov, Czech Republic

2003

Catalina Cirer, first woman mayor of Palma de Mallorca, Spain
Asma Chaabi, first female mayor of Essaouira, and the first woman elected mayor in Morocco
Rosina Hoebes, first woman elected mayor of Swakopmund, Namibia
Laine Jänes, first woman mayor of Tartu, Estonia
Josefa Luzardo, first woman mayor of Las Palmas, Spain
Valentina Matviyenko, first woman mayor of Saint Petersburg, Russia
Aneesa Mirza, the first woman elected mayor of Ahmedabad, India

also the first woman of Muslim faith elected mayor in India

Manorama Dobriyal Sharma, first woman mayor of Dehradun, Uttarakhand, India
Carolyn Terteling-Payne, first woman Mayor of Boise, Idaho, United States
Rose Garland Thornton, first woman mayor pro tem of Grosse Pointe Shores, Michigan (United States)
Lucy Turnbull, first woman Lord Mayor of Sydney, Australia
Joan Vinton, first woman mayor of Shellharbour, New South Wales, Australia

Vinton served as interim mayor and was defeated in an election in December 2003 by deputy mayor David Hamilton.

Angelika Volquartz, first woman mayor of Kiel, Germany

2004

Deborah Cantwell, first woman elected mayor of Lawrence, Indiana, United States

also the first Democrat to be elected mayor in Lawrence

Maja Gojković, first woman mayor of Novi Sad, Serbia
Aminata Thiam, probably the first woman mayor of Dakkar, Senegal
Oumou Sall Seck, first woman mayor of Goundam, Mali
Dianna Freelon-Foster, the first woman and first African-American mayor of Grenada, Mississippi, United States

2005

Kim Driscoll, first woman elected mayor of Salem, Massachusetts, United States
Semiha Borovac, first woman mayor of Sarajevo, Bosnia and Herzegovina
Marija-Maja Ćatović, first woman mayor of Kotor and first female mayor in Montenegro
Andrée Boucher, first woman elected mayor of Quebec City, Quebec, Canada
Dianne Watts, first woman elected mayor of Surrey, British Columbia, Canada
Janet Mikhail, first woman mayor of Ramallah, Palestine

also the first woman mayor of a West Bank town

Violeta Menjívar, first woman mayor of San Salvador, El Salvador
Mercy Williams, first woman mayor of Kochi, India
Prof. R Bindhu, first woman mayor of Thrissur, India
Sheriel F. Perkins, first woman and African American elected mayor of Greenwood, Mississippi, United States
Theresa Murray, first woman mayor of Poplar, Montana, United States

2006

Patricia Christensen, first woman elected mayor of Port St. Lucie, Florida, United States
Eleni Mavrou, first woman elected mayor of Nicosia, Cyprus
Ritt Bjerregaard, first woman mayor of Copenhagen, Denmark
Letizia Moratti, first woman elected mayor of Milan, Italy
Zenaida Moya, first woman elected mayor of Belize City, Belize
Hanna Gronkiewicz-Waltz, first woman elected mayor of Warsaw, Poland
Olga Velazquez, first woman elected mayor of Portage, Indiana, United States
Margaret Hornady, first woman elected mayor of Grand Island, Nebraska, United States
Aissa Kirabo Kakira, first woman elected mayor of Kigali, Rwanda
Irena Ondrová, first woman elected mayor of Zlín, Czech Republic

2007

Rita Ellis, first woman elected mayor of Delray Beach, Florida, United States
Chen Wei, first woman elected mayor of Pingliang, China
Donnalee Lozeau, first woman elected mayor of Nashua, New Hampshire, United States
April Capone Almon, first woman elected mayor of East Haven, Connecticut, United States
Matti Herrera Bower, first woman elected mayor of Miami Beach, Florida, United States
Sheila Dixon, first black woman elected mayor of Baltimore, Maryland, United States
Barbara Ewing, first female Democrat elected mayor of Tell City, Indiana, United States
Susan M. Kay, first woman elected mayor of Weymouth, Massachusetts, United States
Shawna M. Gurgis, first woman elected mayor of Bedford, Indiana
Lisa Scaffidi, first woman elected mayor of Perth, Australia
Katrina Shimbulu, first woman mayor of Oshakati, Namibia
Marta Vincenzi, first woman elected mayor of Genoa, Italy
Mónica Fein, first woman elected mayor of Rosario, Argentina
Aurora Villamayor, first woman elected mayor of Angono, Philippines

2008

Sylviana Murni, first woman appointed mayor of Central Jakarta, Indonesia
Elise Partin, first woman elected mayor of Cayce, South Carolina, United States
Alys Lawson, first woman elected mayor of Conway, South Carolina, United States
Pam Lee, first woman elected mayor of Mullins, South Carolina, United States
Mimi Elrod, first woman elected mayor of Lexington, Virginia, United States
Patricia Sweetland, first woman mayor of Adams, New York, United States
Jeanne-Marie Napolitano, first woman mayor of Newport, Rhode Island, United States
Mary Rossing, first woman elected mayor of Northfield, Minnesota, United States
Nancy Tia Brown, first woman elected mayor of Cody, Wyoming, United States
Wilda Diaz, first woman elected mayor of Perth Amboy, New Jersey, United States
Linda Johnson, first woman elected mayor of Suffolk, Virginia, United States
Jetta Klijnsma, first woman mayor of The Hague, Netherlands
Helma Orosz, first woman elected mayor of Dresden, Germany
Blanca Alcalá, first woman elected mayor of Puebla, Mexico
Sonia Castedo, first woman mayor of Alicante, Spain
Azra Jafari, first woman appointed mayor of Nili and first woman mayor in Afghanistan
Eva Habil, first woman elected mayor of Komboha and first woman mayor in Egypt

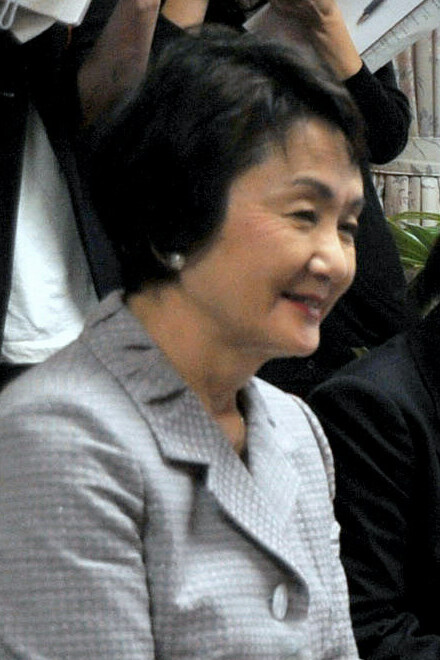
In 2009, Fumiko Hayashi became the first woman to assume the office of Mayor of Yokohama, Japan.

2009

Cheri Barry, first woman elected mayor of Meridian, Mississippi, United States
Donna McFadden-Connors, first woman appointed mayor of Pittston, Pennsylvania, United States
Yordanka Fandakova, first woman elected mayor of Sofia, Bulgaria
Fumiko Hayashi, first woman elected mayor of Yokohama, Japan
Melissa Johnson, first woman elected mayor of West Jordan, Utah, United States
Jyoti Khandelwal, first woman mayor of Jaipur, India
Mia Love, first woman mayor of Saratoga Springs, Utah, United States

also first black woman mayor in the state of Utah

Corine Mauch, first woman elected mayor of Zürich, Switzerland
Stephanie Miner, first woman elected mayor of Syracuse, New York, United States
Natasha Navas, first woman elected mayor of Chaguanas, Trinidad and Tobago
Banda Karthika Reddy, first woman elected mayor of Hyderabad, India
Linda Thompson, first woman elected mayor of Harrisburg, Pennsylvania, United States

also the first African American mayor of Harrisburg

Kimiko Kubota, first woman mayor of Ube, Yamaguchi, Japan

== 2010s ==
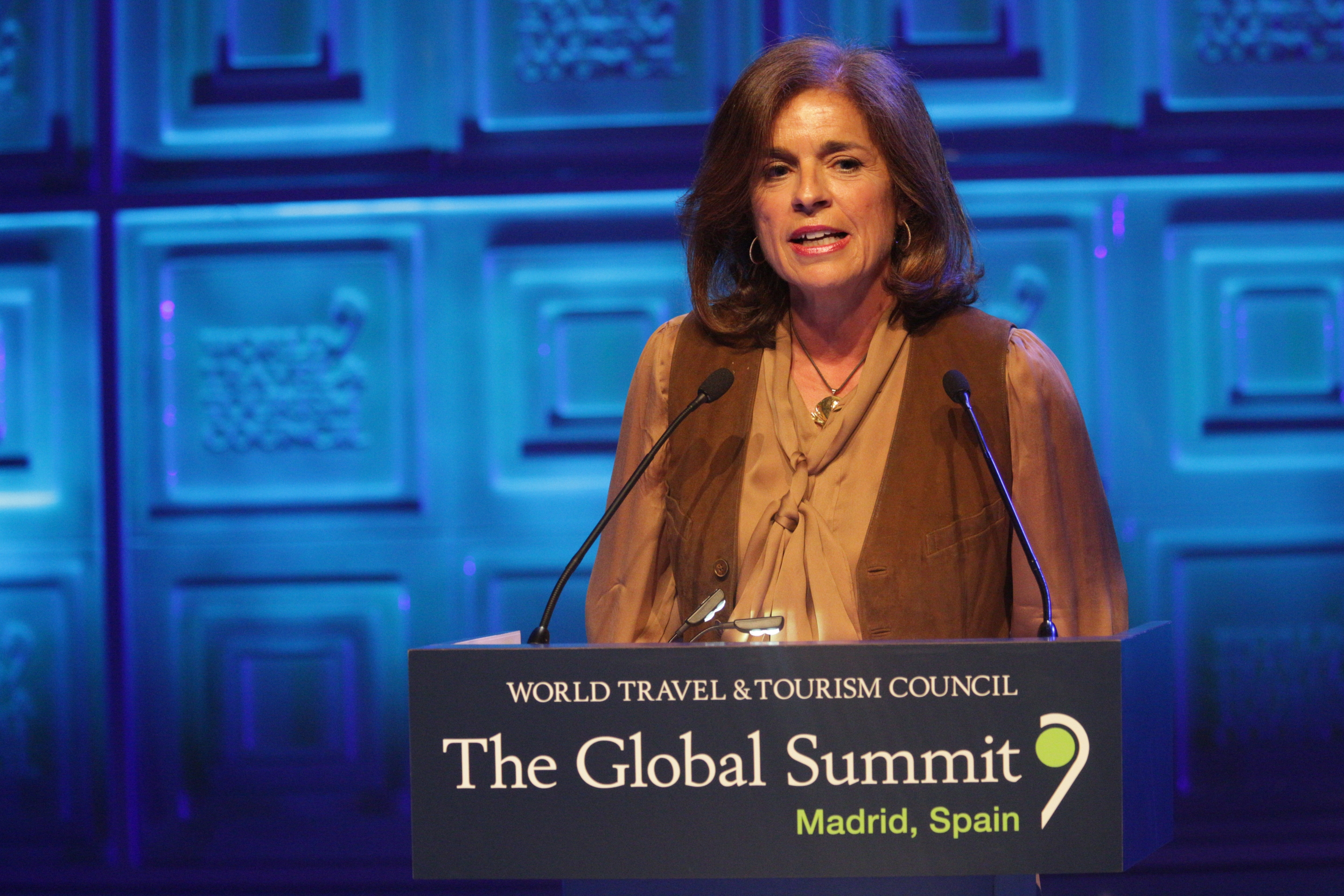
Ana Botella was the first woman to serve as Mayor of Madrid, Spain, serving from 2011 to 2015.

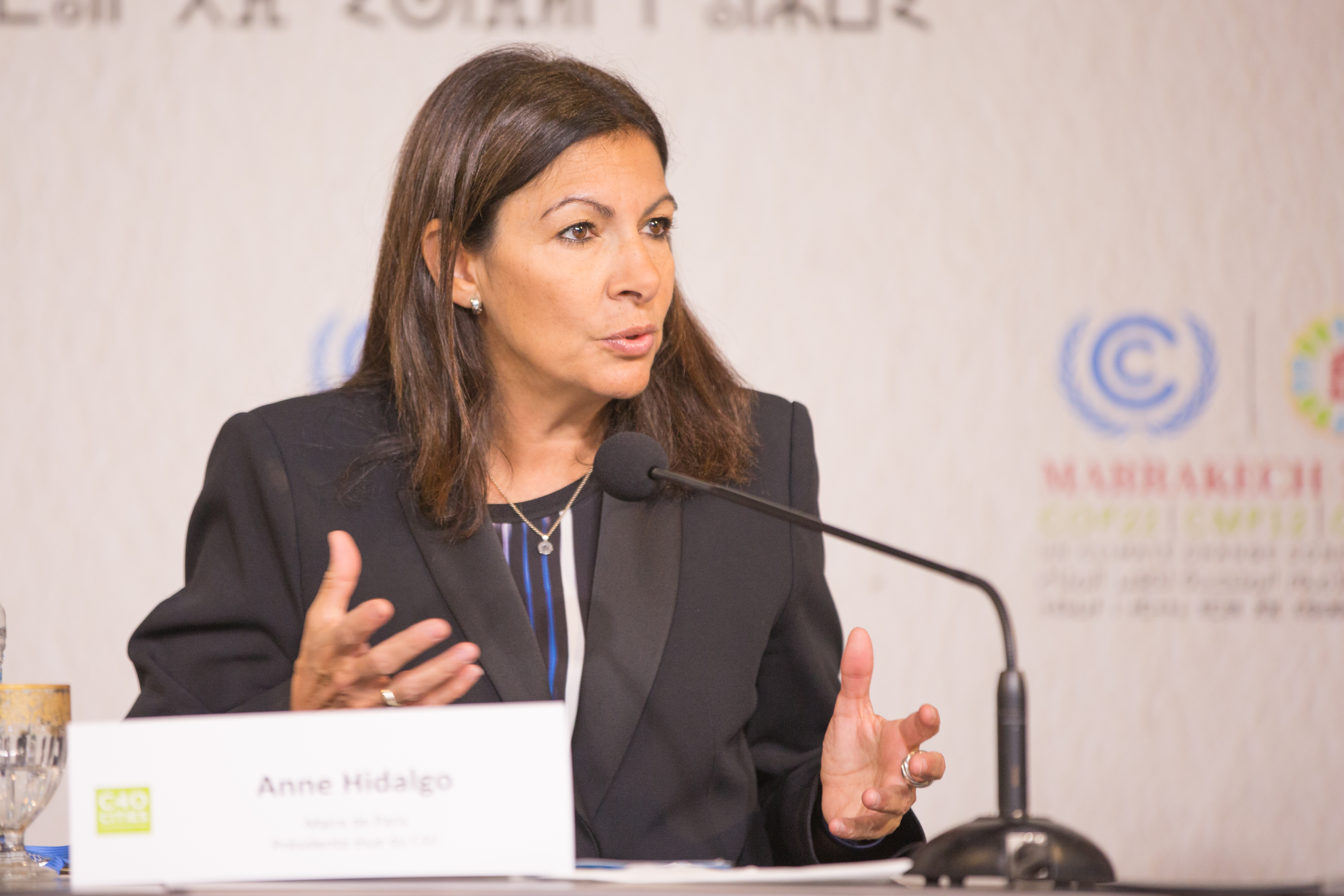
Since 2014, Anne Hidalgo has been serving as the Mayor of Paris, France—the first woman to do so.

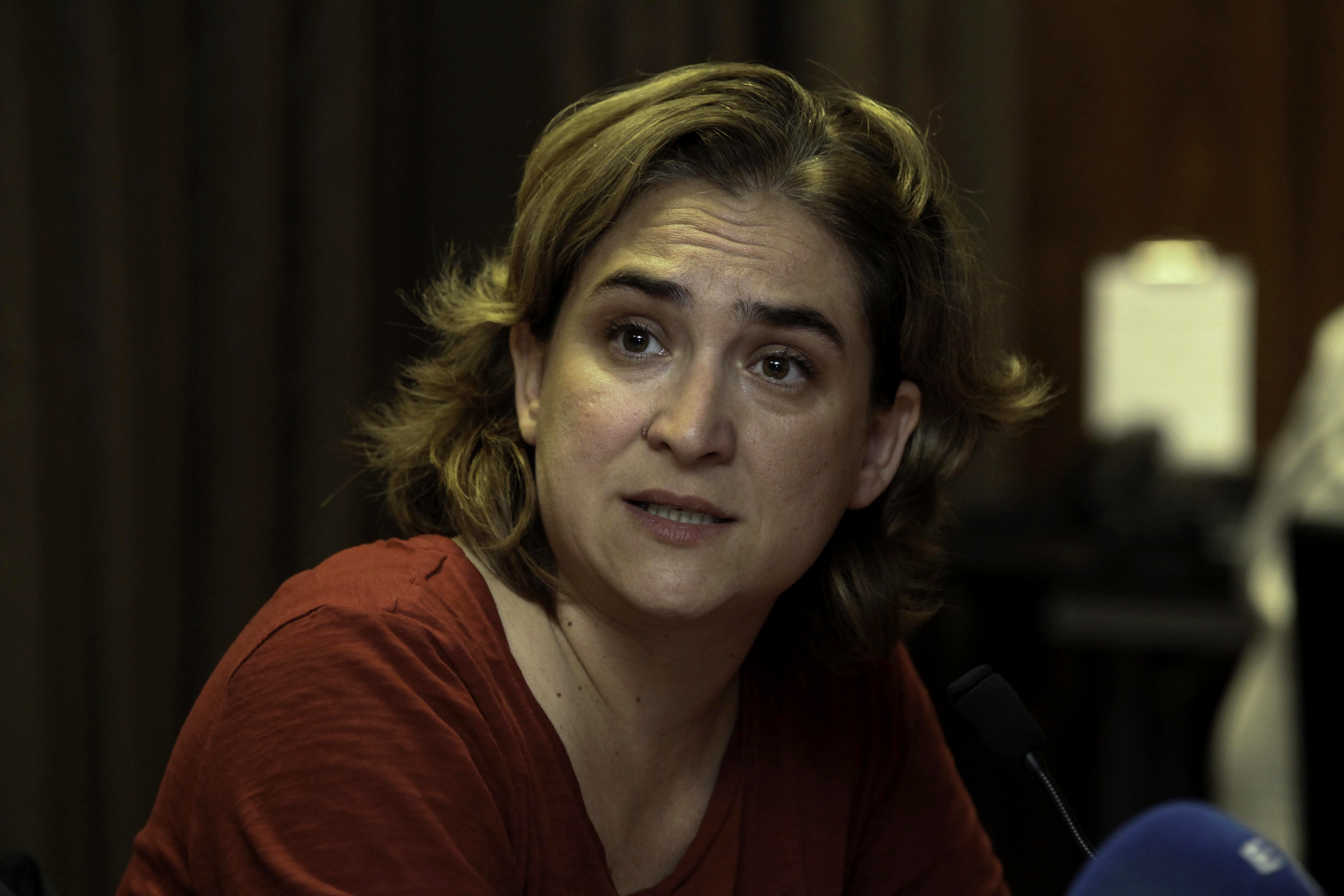
In 2015, Ada Colau became the first woman to assume the office of Mayor of Barcelona, Spain.

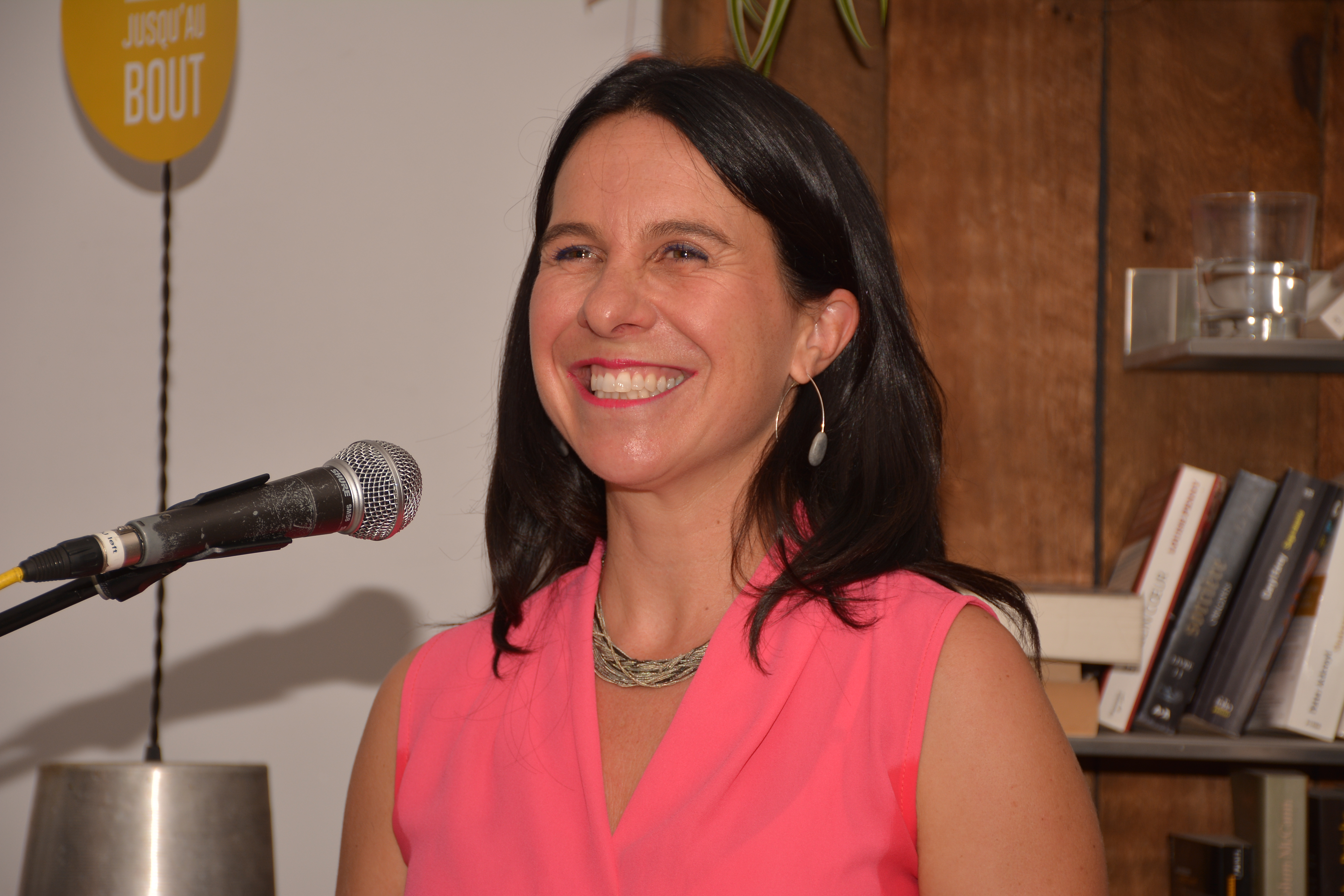
Valérie Plante assumed office as Mayor of Montreal in 2017, making her the first woman to serve as the city's mayor.

2010

Debbie Amaroso, first woman elected mayor of Sault Ste. Marie, Ontario, Canada
Patricia Ayala, first woman elected mayor of Artigas, Uruguay
Shari Decter Hirst, first woman elected mayor of Brandon, Manitoba, Canada
Sara Duterte, first woman elected Mayor of Davao City, Philippines
Kazumi Inamura, first woman mayor of Amagasaki, Japan
Patahiyah Ismail, first woman municipal council president of Penang Island, Malaysia
Katarína Macháčková, first woman mayor of Prievidza, Slovakia
Selma Nelumbu, first woman mayor of Omaruru, Namibia
Ana Olivera, first woman elected mayor of Montevideo, Uruguay
Adriana Peña, first woman elected mayor of Lavalleja, Uruguay
Tri Rismaharini, first woman elected mayor of Surabaya, Indonesia
Elaine Trepper, first black woman mayor of Windhoek, Namibia
Hanna Zdanowska, first woman elected mayor of Łódź, Poland

2011

Ana Botella, first woman designated mayor of Madrid, Spain
Charlotte Brower, first woman elected mayor of North Slope Borough, Alaska, United States
Joyce Chepkoech Korir, first woman elected mayor of Bomet, Kenya
Adelina Farici, first woman elected mayor of Burrel, Albania
Karen Freeman-Wilson, first woman elected mayor of Gary, Indiana, United States

also first African-American woman elected mayor in the State of Indiana

Selina Hayat Ivy, first woman elected mayor of Narayanganj, Bangladesh
Grace Mahosi, first woman elected mayor of Thulamela, Limpopo, South Africa
Lilian Osundwa, first woman elected mayor of Mumias, Kenya
Jean Quan, first woman elected mayor of Oakland, California, United States

also the first Asian American mayor of Oakland

Madeline Rogero, first woman elected mayor of Knoxville, Tennessee, United States
Laura Roughton, first woman elected mayor of Jurupa Valley, California, United States

also first mayor of Jurupa Valley, California

Teresa Tomlinson, first woman elected mayor of Columbus, Georgia, United States
Mercy Wanjiku Kimwe, first woman elected mayor of Muranga, Kenya

2012

Margarita Arellanes Cervantes, first woman elected mayor of Monterrey, Mexico
Vera Baboun, first woman elected mayor of Bethlehem, Palestine
Joanna Gash, first woman elected mayor of Shoalhaven, Australia
Jodie Harrison, first woman elected mayor of Lake Macquarie, Australia
Halyna Hereha, first woman appointed mayor of Kyiv, Ukraine
Dorothy Hubbard, first woman elected mayor of Albany, Georgia, United States
Naomi Koshi, first woman elected mayor of Ōtsu, Japan
Kelli Linville, first woman elected mayor of Bellingham, Washington, United States
Alice Patino, first woman elected mayor of Santa Maria, California, United States
Frances Ann Romero, first woman elected mayor of Guadalupe, California, United States

2013

Trish Abato, first woman elected mayor of Suffern, New York, United States
Alinah Ahmad, first woman mayor of Petaling Jaya, Malaysia
Priscilla Arhin, probably the first woman elected mayor of Cape Coast, Ghana
Teuta Arifi, first woman elected mayor of Tetovo, Macedonia (North Macedonia)
Mary Ann Arnold, first woman elected mayor of Marked Tree, Arkansas, United States
Karen Cadieux, first woman mayor of Easthampton, Massachusetts (United States)
Usha Chaudhary, first woman mayor of Kashipur, Uttarakhand, India
Dorine Chukowry, first woman elected mayor of Port Louis, Mauritius
Renu Dabla, first woman elected mayor of Rohtak, India
Agnes Delgado-Tolentino, first woman elected mayor of Tagaytay, Philippines
Anita Dugatto, first woman elected mayor of Derby, Connecticut, United States
Belen Fernandez, first woman elected mayor of Dagupan, Philippines
Toni Harp, first woman elected mayor, and first female African-American mayor of New Haven, Connecticut, United States
Ashley Hennings, first woman elected mayor of Newport, New York, United States
Deb Hinchey, first woman elected mayor of Norwich, Connecticut, United States
Stacey Jordan, first woman elected mayor of Moorestown, New Jersey, United States
Soni Koli, first woman mayor of Rudrapur, Uttarakhand, India
Cecilia Oba Tito, first woman elected mayor of Yei, South Sudan and also the first female mayor in South Sudan
Olga Rasamimanana, first woman elected mayor of Antananarivo, Madagascar
Kathy Sheehan, first woman elected mayor of Albany, New York, United States
Katrin Stjernfeldt Jammeh, first woman elected mayor of Malmö, Sweden
Jean Stothert, first woman elected mayor of Omaha, Nebraska, United States
Stephanie Uy-Tan, first woman elected mayor of Catbalogan, Philippines
Lovely Warren, first woman elected mayor, and first African-American woman mayor of Rochester, New York, United States
Del Rae Williams, first woman elected mayor of Moorhead, Minnesota, United States
Diana Willits, first woman elected mayor of Windsor Heights, Iowa, United States
Maile Wilson, first woman elected mayor of Cedar City, Utah, United States

2014

Katari Anuradha, first woman mayor of Chittoor, India
Louise Carter-King, first woman elected mayor of Gillette, Wyoming, United States
Lourdes "Baby" S. Cataquiz, first woman elected mayor of San Pedro, Laguna, Philippines
Maty Mint Hamady, first woman elected mayor of Nouakchott, Mauritania
Anne Hidalgo, first woman elected Mayor of Paris, France
Lisa Helps, first woman elected mayor of Victoria, British Columbia, Canada
Gültan Kışanak, first woman elected mayor of Diyarbakır, Turkey
Adriana Krnáčová, first woman elected mayor of Prague, Czech Republic
Mimoza Kusari-Lila, first woman elected mayor of Gjakova, Kosovo
Mayra Peña Lindsay, first woman mayor of Key Biscayne, Florida, United States
Sylvia Muzila, first woman elected mayor of Francistown, Botswana
Shaik Noorjahan, first woman elected mayor of Eluru, Andhra Pradesh, India
Joana Ntaja, first woman elected mayor of Zomba, Malawi
Tana Raymond, first woman elected mayor of Garfield, New Jersey, United States
Johanna Rolland, first woman elected mayor of Nantes, France
Celeste Sanchez, first woman elected mayor of San Benito, Texas, United States
Liesbeth Spies, first woman mayor of Alphen aan den Rijn, Netherlands (since 15 December 2014)
Marian Tudela, first woman mayor of Saipan, Northern Mariana Islands
Andrea Turčanová, first woman elected mayor of Prešov, Slovakia

2015

Zekra Alwach, first woman mayor of Baghdad, Iraq
Gail Ash, first woman elected mayor of Clermont, Florida, United States
Megan Barry, first woman elected mayor of Nashville, Tennessee, United States
Manuela Carmena, first woman elected mayor of Madrid, Spain
Ada Colau, first woman elected mayor of Barcelona, Spain
Christine Dansereau, first woman elected mayor of Roselle, New Jersey, United States
Laura Hill, first woman elected mayor of Southlake, Texas, United States
Patahiyah Ismail, first woman mayor of Penang Island, Malaysia
Věra Nechybová, first woman mayor of Ústí nad Labem, Czech Republic
Henriette Reker, first woman elected mayor of Cologne, Germany
Pravina Thakur, first woman elected mayor of Vasai-Virar, India
Karen Weaver, PhD, first woman elected mayor of Flint, Michigan, United States
Maria Kaiser-Eberle, first woman elected mayor of Ruggell, Liechtenstein

2016

Rosalynn Bliss, first woman elected as mayor of Grand Rapids, Michigan, United States
Gabriela Firea, first woman elected mayor of Bucharest, Romania
Milissa Holland, first woman elected mayor of Palm Coast, Florida, United States
Yuriko Koike, first woman elected governor of Tokyo, Japan
Maimunah Mohd Sharif, first woman municipal council president of Seberang Perai, Malaysia
Lily Mei, first woman elected mayor of Fremont, California, United States
Lani Mercado, first woman elected Mayor of Bacoor, Philippines
Marian Orr, first woman elected mayor of Cheyenne, Wyoming, United States
Virginia Raggi, first woman elected mayor of Rome, Italy
Michelle Roman, first woman elected as Mayor of Kingsburg, California, United States

2017

Loretta Baker, first woman elected mayor of Maitland, New South Wales, Australia
Sanyukta Bhatia, first woman elected mayor of Lucknow, India
Sharon Weston Broome first woman elected as Mayor-President of Baton Rouge, Louisiana, United States
Tasha Cerda, first woman to be elected Mayor of Gardena, California, United States

Also the first person of either African American and Native American descent to be elected mayor of Gardena and the first person of Native American descent to be elected mayor in the state of California.

Tjhai Chui Mie, first woman elected mayor of Singkawang, Indonesia
Joyce Craig, first woman elected mayor of Manchester, New Hampshire, United States
Cassie Franklin, first woman elected Mayor of Everett, Washington, United States
Ruthanne Fuller, first woman elected mayor of Newton, Massachusetts, United States
Lyda Krewson, first woman elected mayor of Saint Louis, Missouri, United States
Diane Langman, first woman elected mayor of Warfield, British Columbia, Canada
Anne McEnerny-Ogle, first woman elected mayor of Vancouver, Washington, United States
Silvia Radu, acting mayor of Chișinău, Moldova
Valérie Plante, first woman elected mayor of Montreal, Quebec, Canada
Yvonne M. Spicer, first woman elected mayor of Framingham, Massachusetts, United States
Lynn Spruill, first woman elected mayor of Starkville, Mississippi, United States
Carol Westfall, first woman elected mayor of Klamath Falls, Oregon, United States

2018

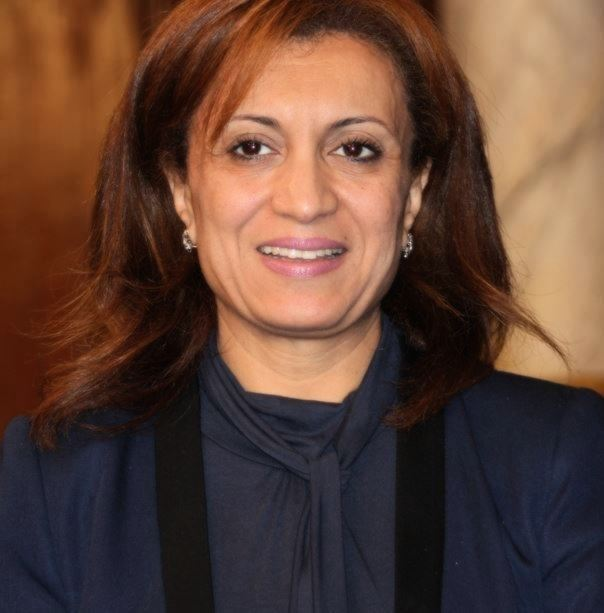
Souad Abderrahim became the first elected female mayor of Tunisia on 3 July 2018.

Latoya Cantrell, first woman elected mayor of New Orleans, Louisiana, United States
Femke Halsema, first woman elected mayor of Amsterdam, Netherlands
Einat Kalisch-Rotem, first woman elected mayor of Haifa, Israel see: 2018 Haifa mayoral election
Anita Mamgain, first woman mayor of Rishikesh, Uttarakhand, India
Hemlata Negi, first woman mayor of Kotdwar, Uttarakhand, India
Lisa Pasin, first woman elected mayor of Trail, British Columbia, Canada
Anita Sharma, first woman mayor of Haridwar, Uttarakhand, India
Claudia Sheinbaum, first woman elected mayor of Mexico City, Mexico (since 5 December 2018)
Souad Abderrahim, first woman mayor of Tunis, Tunisia in its first local election

2019

Aleksandra Dulkiewicz, first woman mayor of Gdańsk, Poland
Juliana Kaduya, first woman mayor of Lilongwe, Malawi
Claudia López, first woman elected mayor of Bogotá, Colombia
Lova Rajaona, first woman mayor of Antanifotsy, Madagascar
Safiya Hassan Sheikh Ali Jimale, Mayor of Beledweyne, first woman mayor in Somalia

== 2020s ==
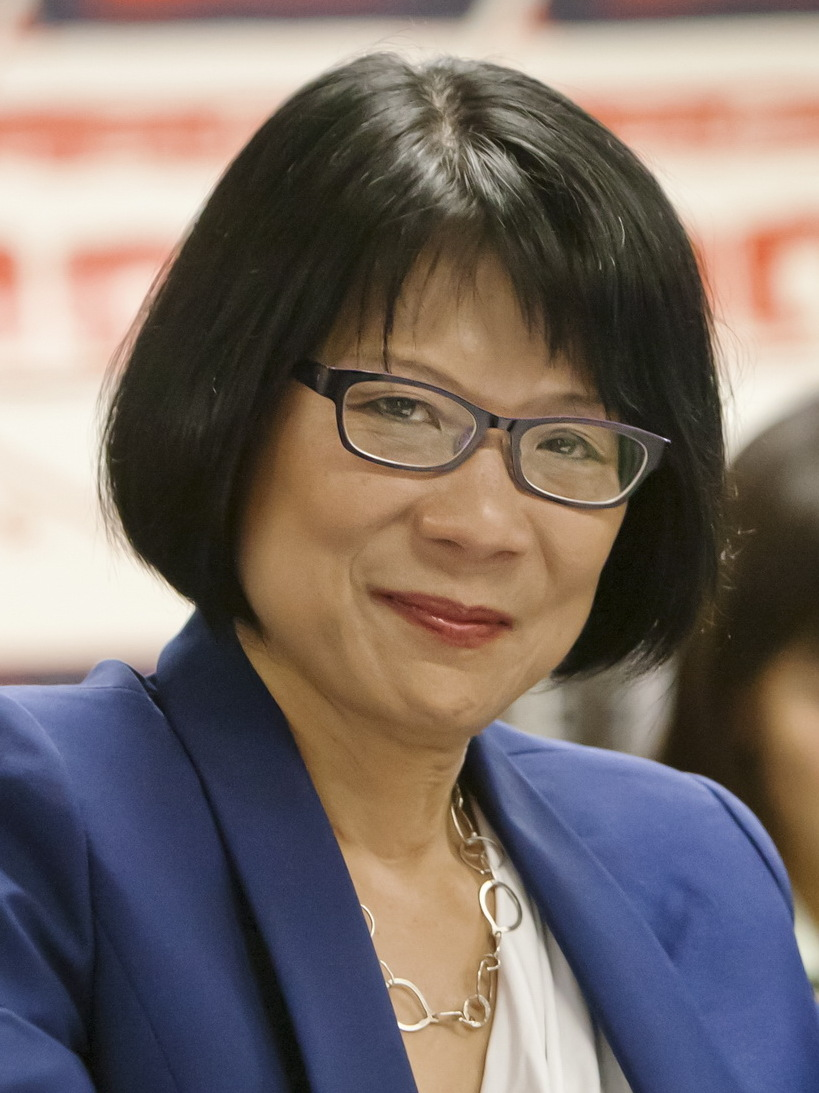
In 2023, Olivia Chow became the first woman to assume the office of Mayor of post-amalgamation Toronto, Canada.

2020

Sandra Masters, first woman elected mayor of Regina, Saskatchewan, Canada
Ella Jones, first woman and elected mayor of Ferguson, Missouri, United States

also the first African American woman elected mayor

Michèle Rubirola, first woman mayor of Marseille, France
Saleema McCree Thomas, first woman elected mayor of Point Fortin, Trinidad and Tobago (since 26 August 2020).

2021

Nyachek De-tuel, first woman mayor of Bentiu, South Sudan
Jyoti Gondek, first woman elected mayor of Calgary, Alberta, Canada
Kim Janey, acting mayor of Boston, Massachusetts, United States

also first African American mayor of Boston

Michelle Wu, first woman elected mayor of Boston, Massachusetts, United States

also first Asian American mayor of Boston

2022

Andrea Horwath, first woman elected mayor of Hamilton, Ontario, Canada
Honey Lacuna, first woman mayor of Manila, Philippines
Maila Ting-Que, first woman mayor of Tuguegarao, Philippines
Dagmar Škodová Parmová, first woman mayor of České Budějovice, Czech Republic
Pavlína Springerová, first woman mayor of Hradec Králové, Czech Republic
Mohinder Midha, first female Dalit Mayor in United Kingdom.

2023

Flora Gabriel Modi, first woman mayor of Juba, South Sudan
Olivia Chow, first woman elected mayor of post-amalgamation Toronto, Ontario, Canada

also first Asian Canadian mayor of Toronto

2024

Cynthia Block, first woman elected mayor of Saskatoon, Saskatchewan, Canada
Cherelle Parker, first woman mayor of Philadelphia, Pennsylvania, United States

also 100th mayor of Philadelphia overall

2025

Anita Agrawal, first woman mayor of Roorkee, Uttarakhand, India
Arti Bhandari, first woman mayor of Sringar, Uttarakhand, India
Kalpana Devlal, first woman mayor of Pithoragarh, Uttarakhand, India
Amy Marasco, first woman mayor of Lewes, Delaware, United States
Eileen Higgins, first woman elected mayor of Miami, Florida, United States
Mary Sheffield, first woman elected mayor of Detroit, Michigan, United States

== See also ==
- List of first women governors and chief ministers
- List of first women mayors
- List of first women mayors (18th and 19th centuries)
- List of first women mayors (20th century)
- List of first women mayors in the United States
- List of the first women holders of political offices
- Women in government
