= List of first women mayors (18th and 19th centuries) =

The following is a list of the first woman to serve as mayor of their respective municipalities.

== 1730s ==
1734

Madame Malotteau, first woman to execute the office of mayor of Namur, Belgium

Her husband served as mayor and following his death his colleagues requested she take over the mayoral duties.

== 1780s ==
1788

Johanne Dorothea Glomstad (1756-1835) was a Danish businesswoman and colonial official. She had the office købmand or kolonibestyrer ("Merchant or Colonial Administrator") of the colonial city of Jakobshavn (Ilulissat) in April-July 1788.

== 1860s ==
1862

Nancy Smith, first woman elected mayor in the United States in Oskaloosa, Iowa, United States but declined to serve as mayor.

== 1880s ==
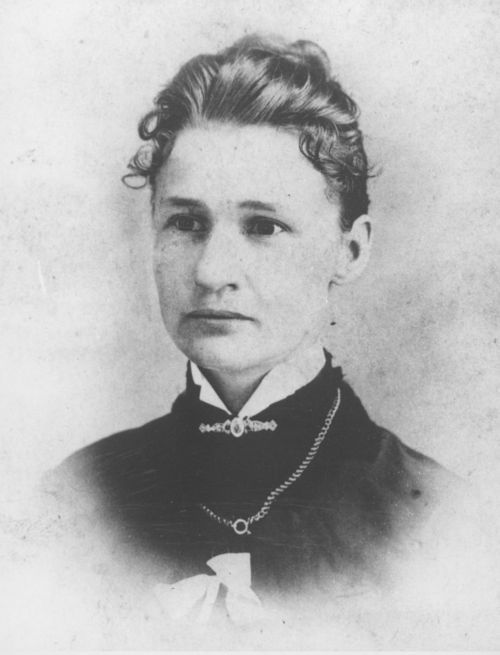
Susanna M. Salter was the first woman to serve as mayor in the United States.

1887

Susanna M. Salter, the first woman to serve as mayor in United States as mayor of Argonia, Kansas, United States

1888

Mary D. Lowman, the first woman elected mayor of Oskaloosa, Kansas, United States

She served alongside the first all-woman city council in the United States.

1889

America L. King, first woman mayor of Elk Falls, Kansas, United States
Ella Miller, first woman mayor of Rossville, Kansas, United States
Wilhelmina Morgan, first woman mayor of Cottonwood Falls, Kansas, United States
Lucy Sullivan, the first woman mayor of Baldwin City, Kansas, United States

== 1890s ==
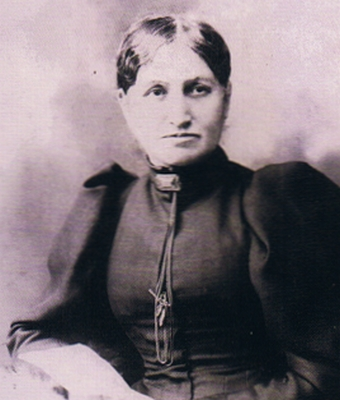
Elizabeth Yates was the first woman elected mayor in the British Empire in 1893

1890

Belle Gray, first woman mayor of Canton, Kansas, United States

1891

Mary E. Paxton, first woman mayor of Kiowa, Kansas, United States
Elizabeth Vedder, first woman mayor of Haddam, Kansas, United States

1893

Elizabeth Yates, first woman mayor in the British Empire and first female mayor of Onehunga, New Zealand
Emma J. Barnes, elected the first woman mayor of Geuda Springs, Kansas, United States.
Smith, first woman mayor of Wamego, Kansas, United States

1894

Anna Austin, the first woman mayor of Pleasanton, Kansas, United States [population approx., 1,500]

1895

Alice E. Burns, first woman mayor of Florence, Oregon, United States

Burns was also the first woman elected in the state of Oregon. Women were elected to all other town offices as well.

Antoinette L. Haskell, the first woman mayor of Gaylord, Kansas, United States

1896

Clara A. Curtis, the first woman mayor of Cimarron, Kansas, United States
May Burbank Wade, the first woman mayor of Ellis, Kansas, United States

Wade served with an all-woman municipal government.

1897

Anna M. Strain, the first woman mayor of Jamestown, Kansas, United States

1898

Jesse Parker, first woman mayor of Kendrick, Idaho, United States

also the first woman mayor in the state of Idaho.

1899

Elizabeth Totten, first woman mayor of Beattie, Kansas, United States

== See also ==
- List of first women governors and chief ministers
- List of first women mayors
- List of first women mayors (20th century)
- List of first women mayors (21st century)
- List of first women mayors in the United States
- List of the first women holders of political offices
- Women in government
