= 2024 Haifa municipal election =

Mayoral election in Haifa

- 27 February 2024
- Mayoral election
- Turnout: 43.74% (First round); 34.45% (Second round)
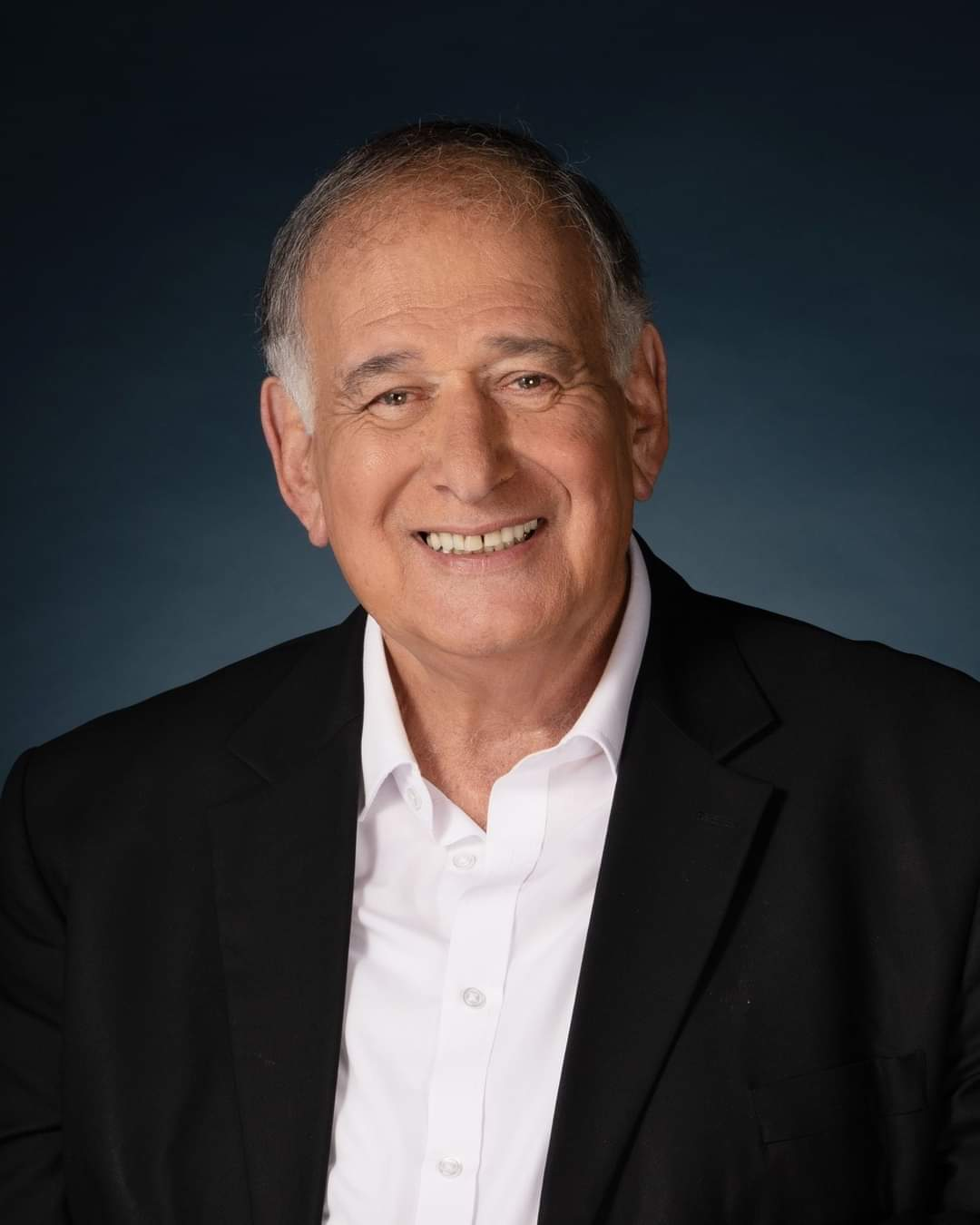
Candidate	Yona Yahav	David Etzioni
Party	Our Haifa	Our Home
Popular vote	57,323	34,281
Percentage	62.58%	37.42%
Mayor before election
Einat Kalisch-Rotem
Living in Haifa
Elected mayor
Yona Yahav
Our City
- City council election
- Turnout: 43.94%
Party	Leader	Vote %	Seats	+/–
Our Haifa	Yona Yahav	13.79	5	+1
The Greens - B&W	Avihu Han	7.90	3	−1
Our City	David Etzioni	7.08	2	−1
Haifa for us - New Deal	Sarit Golan	6.70	2	+1
Likud	Yaniv Ben-Shushan	4.99	2	−1
Haifa Beiteinu	Tatiana John	4.97	2	0
Yesh Atid	Yossi Yosef Shalom	4.71	2	+2
Pensioners' Lobby	Israel Savyon	4.50	2	+1
Hadash	Raja Zaatra	4.36	2	0
Ani Hai-Po	Kirill Karetnik	3.91	1	+1
Connected to Haifa	Ya'akov Borovski	3.74	1	+1
Shas	Uri Ozen	3.50	1	0
United Agudat Yisrael	Avraham Stern	3.37	1	0
Degel for the Resident	Michael Alfer	3.30	1	−1
United Religious Zionists	Yosef-Meir Hanig	3.03	1	0
City Majority	Sally Abed	3.00	1	+1
Balad	Dakwar Sharbel	2.96	1	+1
I Care	Zvika Barabi	2.84	1	0
This lists parties that won seats. See the complete results below.

The 2024 Haifa municipal election was held 27 February 2024 to elect the mayor and city council of Haifa. Originally scheduled for 31 October 2023, the elections were delayed due to the Gaza war.

== Background ==
Haifa's incumbent mayor was Einat Kalisch-Rotem who had defeated the previous mayor, Yona Yahav, in 2018.

In July 2021, several parties in the City Council formed the Change Council, an informal coalition of parties opposing Kalisch-Rotem. The Change Council held a majority in the City Council. Later that month, two of Kalisch-Rotem's deputy mayors were removed from office by the City Council, and replaced by Change Council members in August.

On 13 June 2023, former Mayor Yona Yahav announced his intention to run for Mayor. Yahav won the mayoral election in February 2024 by defeating David Etzioni, winning over 62% of the vote.

== Candidates ==
=== Declared ===
- Einat Kalisch-Rotem - Incumbent Mayor.
- David Etzioni - Lawyer.
- Israel Savyon - Former Deputy Mayor of Haifa.
- Ya'akov Borkovski - Former City Councillor and candidate for Mayor in 2008 and 2013.
- Yona Yahav - former mayor of Haifa (2003-2018), Member of the Knesset (1996-1999).
- Kirill Karetnik - Former City Councillor, and the new Chairman of the Haifa Immigrant Absorption Authority (2024)

=== Expressed Interest ===
- Naama Lazimi - Member of the Knesset (2021-).

== Results ==
=== Mayoral ===
Candidate	Party	First round		Second round	
Candidate	Party	Votes	%	Votes	%
Yona Yahav	Our Haifa	40,677	35.98	57,323	62.58
David Etzioni	Our Home	24,864	21.99	34,281	37.42
Ya'akov Borovski	Connected to Haifa and Kiryat Hayim	13,242	11.71		
Avihu Han	The Greens - Blue and White	10,725	9.49		
Sarit Golan-Steinberg	Haifa for us - New Deal	5,178	4.58		
Einat Kalisch-Rotem	Living in Haifa	5,094	4.51		
Kirill Karetnik	Ani Hai-Po	4,934	4.36		
Zvika Barabi	I Care about the Residents of Haifa	2,576	2.28		
Yossi Yosef Shalom	Yesh Atid and Haifa's Youth	2,061	1.82		
Ibrahim Ghatas	For Our Children	1,805	1.60		
Lazar Kaplon	Da Haifa	1,510	1.34		
Ishak Balas	Haifans Together Win Together	382	0.34		
Total		113,048	100.00	91,604	100.00
Valid votes		113,048	96.32	91,604	99.09
Invalid/blank votes		4,317	3.68	845	0.91
Total votes		117,365	100.00	92,449	100.00
Registered voters/turnout		268,342	43.74	268,342	34.45
Source: Reshumot, Municipality of Haifa

=== City council ===
Party	Leader	Votes	%	Seats	+/–
Our Haifa	Yona Yahav	15,849	13.79	5	+1
The Greens - Blue and White	Avihu Han	9,073	7.90	3	-1
Our Home	David Etzioni	8,131	7.08	2	-1
Haifa for us - New Deal	Sarit Golan-Steinberg	7,695	6.70	2	+1
Likud	Yaniv Ben-Shushan	5,731	4.99	2	-1
Haifa Beiteinu	Tatiana John	5,714	4.97	2	0
Yesh Atid and Haifa's Youth	Yossi Yosef Shalom	5,408	4.71	2	New
Pensioners' Lobby	Israel Savyon	5,169	4.50	2	+1
Hadash	Raja Zaatra	5,010	4.36	2	0
Ani Hai-Po	Kirill Karetnik	4,488	3.91	1	New
Connected to Haifa and Kiryat Hayim	Ya'akov Borovski	4,301	3.74	1	New
Shas	Uri Ozen	4,026	3.50	1	0
United Agudat Yisrael	Avraham Stern	3,878	3.37	1	0
Degel for the Resident	Michael Alfer	3,787	3.30	1	-1
United Religious Zionists	Yosef-Meir Hanig	3,478	3.03	1	0
City Majority	Sally Abed	3,451	3.00	1	New
Balad and Local Leadership	Dakwar Sharbel	3,400	2.96	1	New
I Care about the Residents of Haifa	Zvika Barabi	3,268	2.84	1	0
Living in Haifa	Einat Kalisch-Rotem	2,548	2.22	0	-4
Only Zionism	Yoav Ramati	2,188	1.90	0	New
Da Haifa	Lazar Kaplon	2,131	1.85	0	New
Haifa Development	Nir Shover	2,098	1.83	0	New
For Our Children	Ibrahim Ghatas	1,472	1.28	0	New
The Resident in the Center	Yaakov Sheetrit	1,395	1.21	0	New
Tech and the City	Nachshon Tzuk	822	0.72	0	New
Haifans Together Win Together	Ishak Balas	402	0.35	0	New
Total		114,913	100.00	31	–
Valid votes		114,913	97.45		
Invalid/blank votes		3,004	2.55		
Total votes		117,917	100.00		
Registered voters/turnout		268,342	43.94		
Source: Reshumot, Municipality of Haifa

== Gallery ==
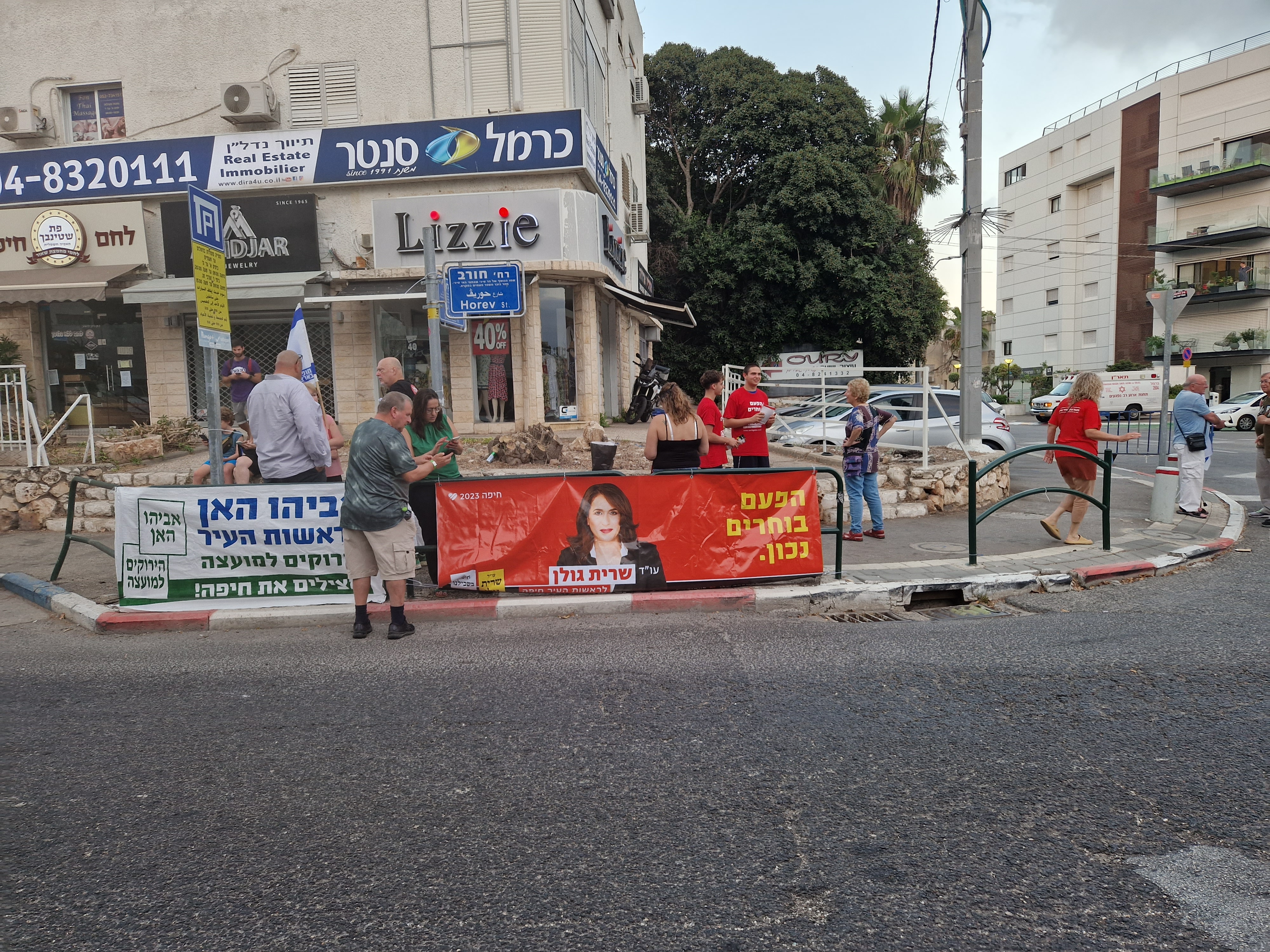
Election posters of Sarit Golan (right) and Avihu Han

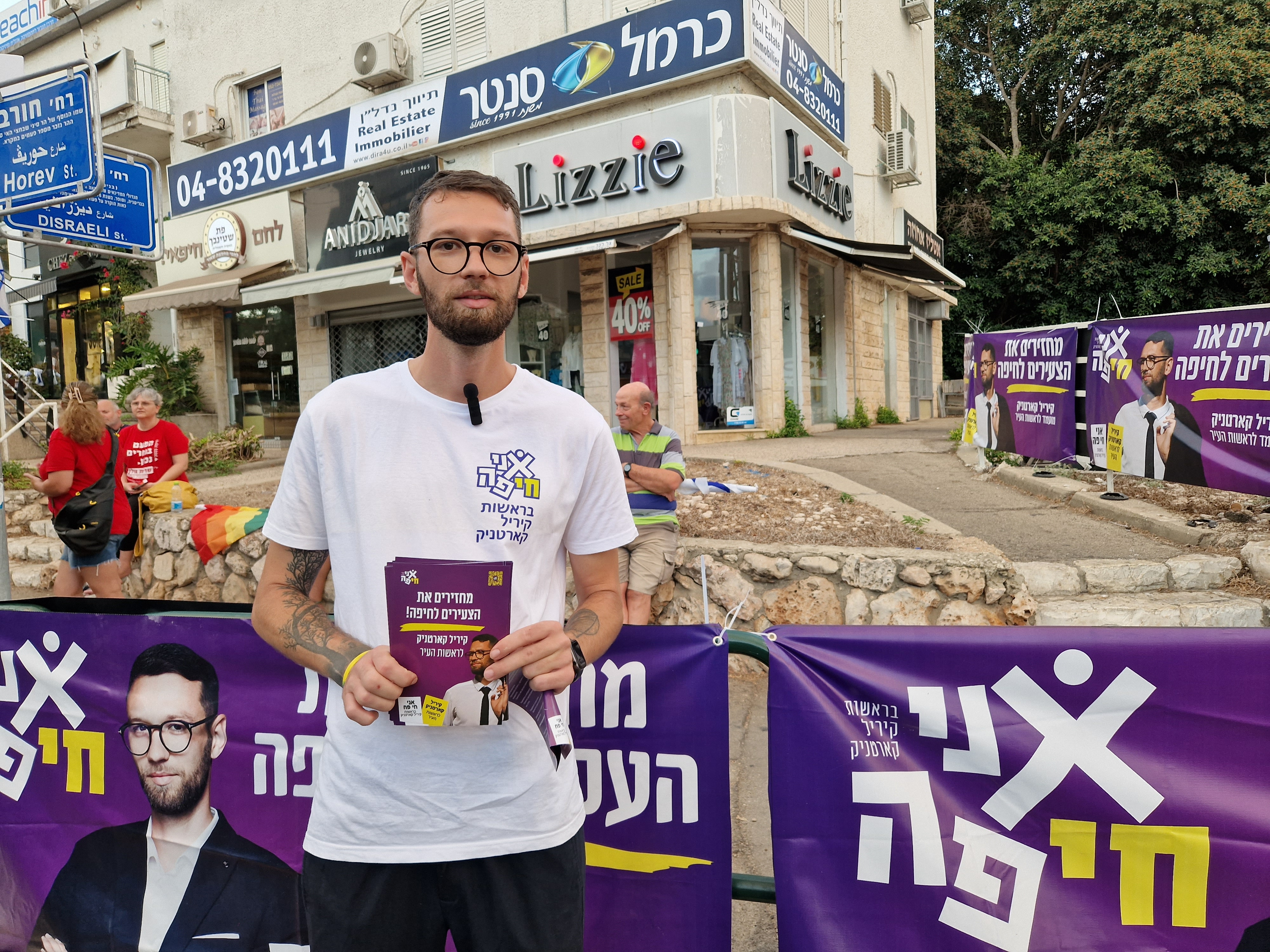
Candidate Kirill Karetnik and posters supporting him

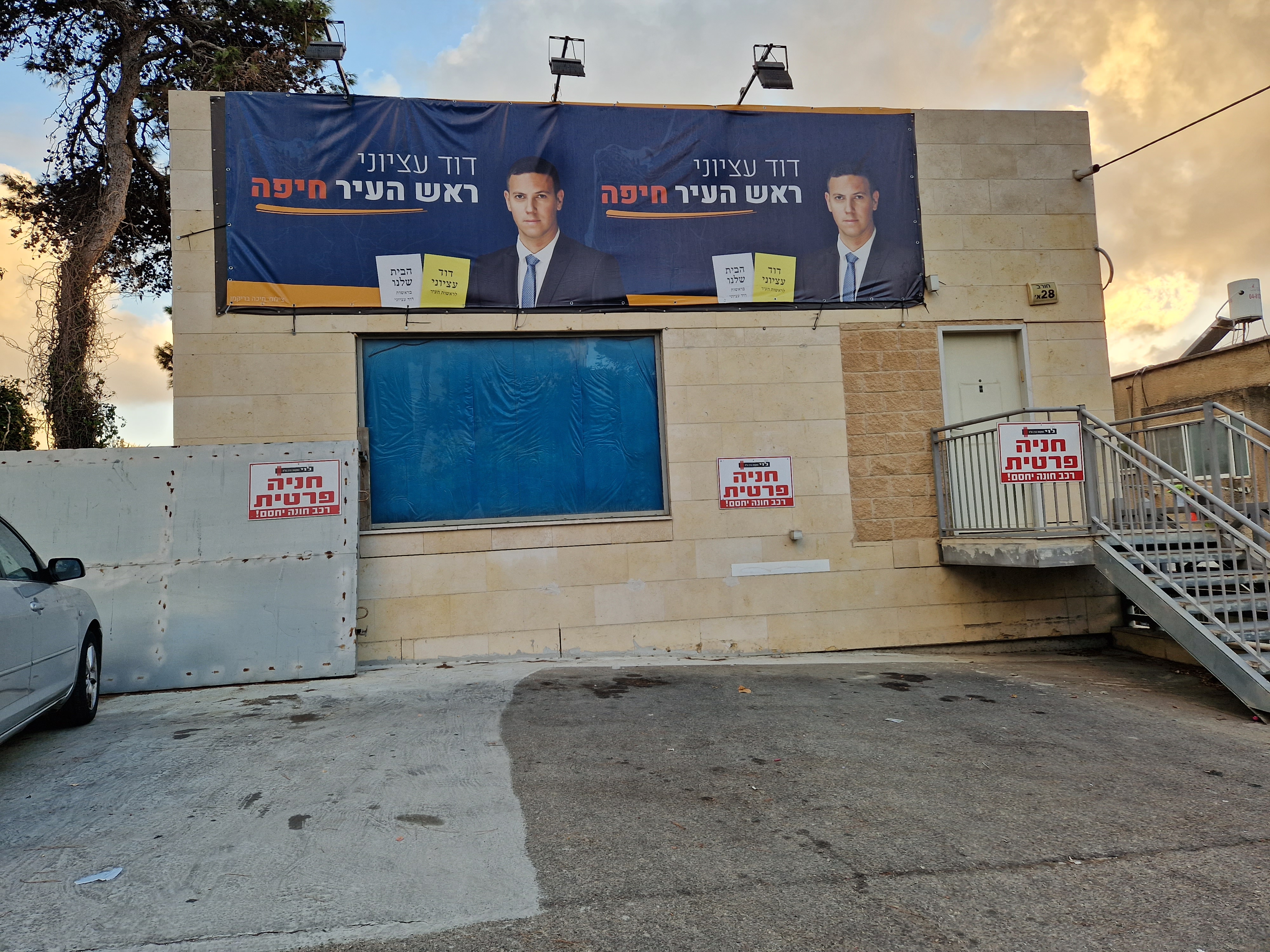
Election posters of David Etzioni

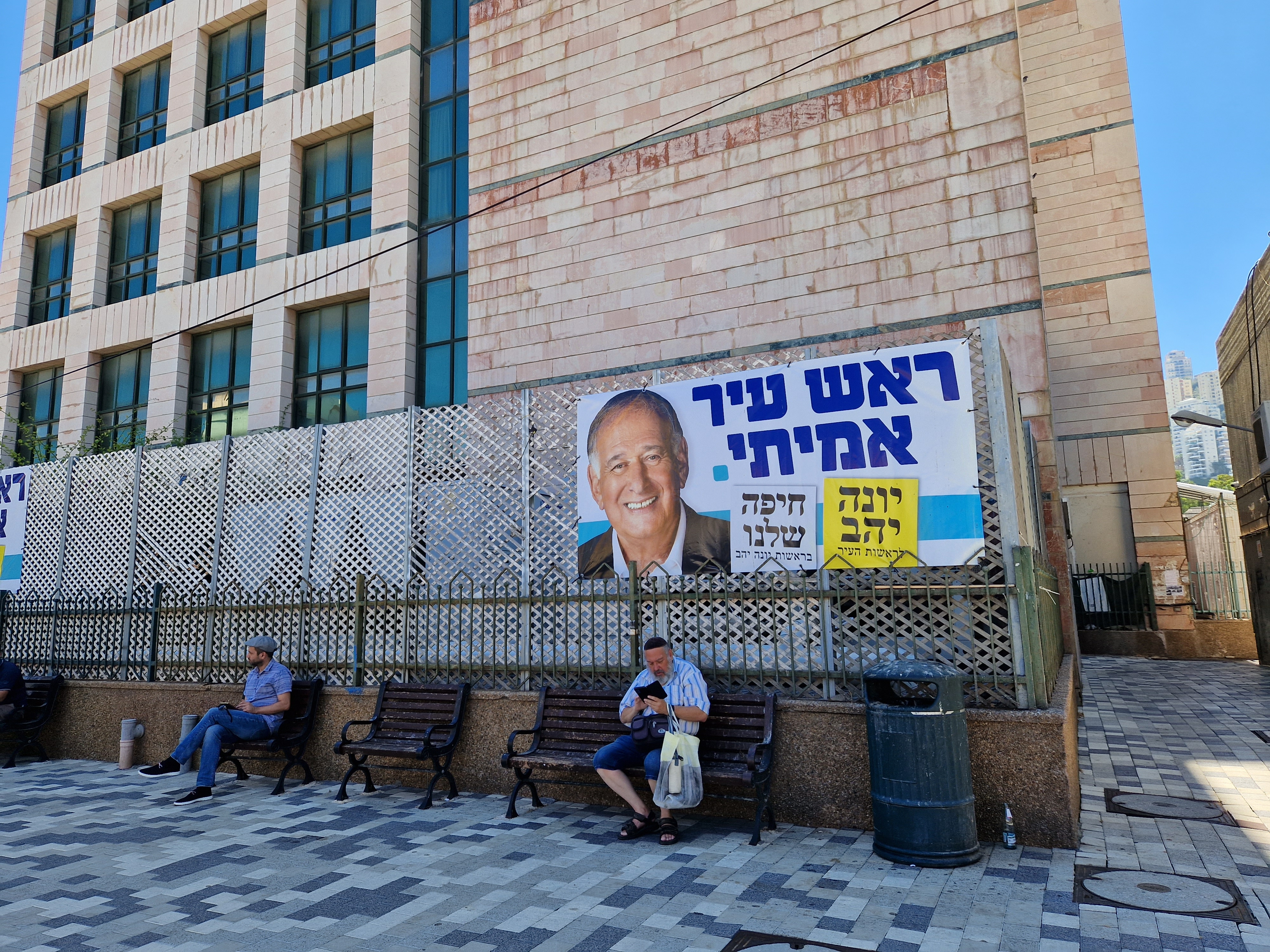
Election poster of Yona Yahav in Kiryat Eliezer, Haifa
