= UNESCO Square =

Roundabout in Haifa, Israel

UNESCO Square for Tolerance and Peace
- כיכר אונסק"ו לסובלנות ולשלום
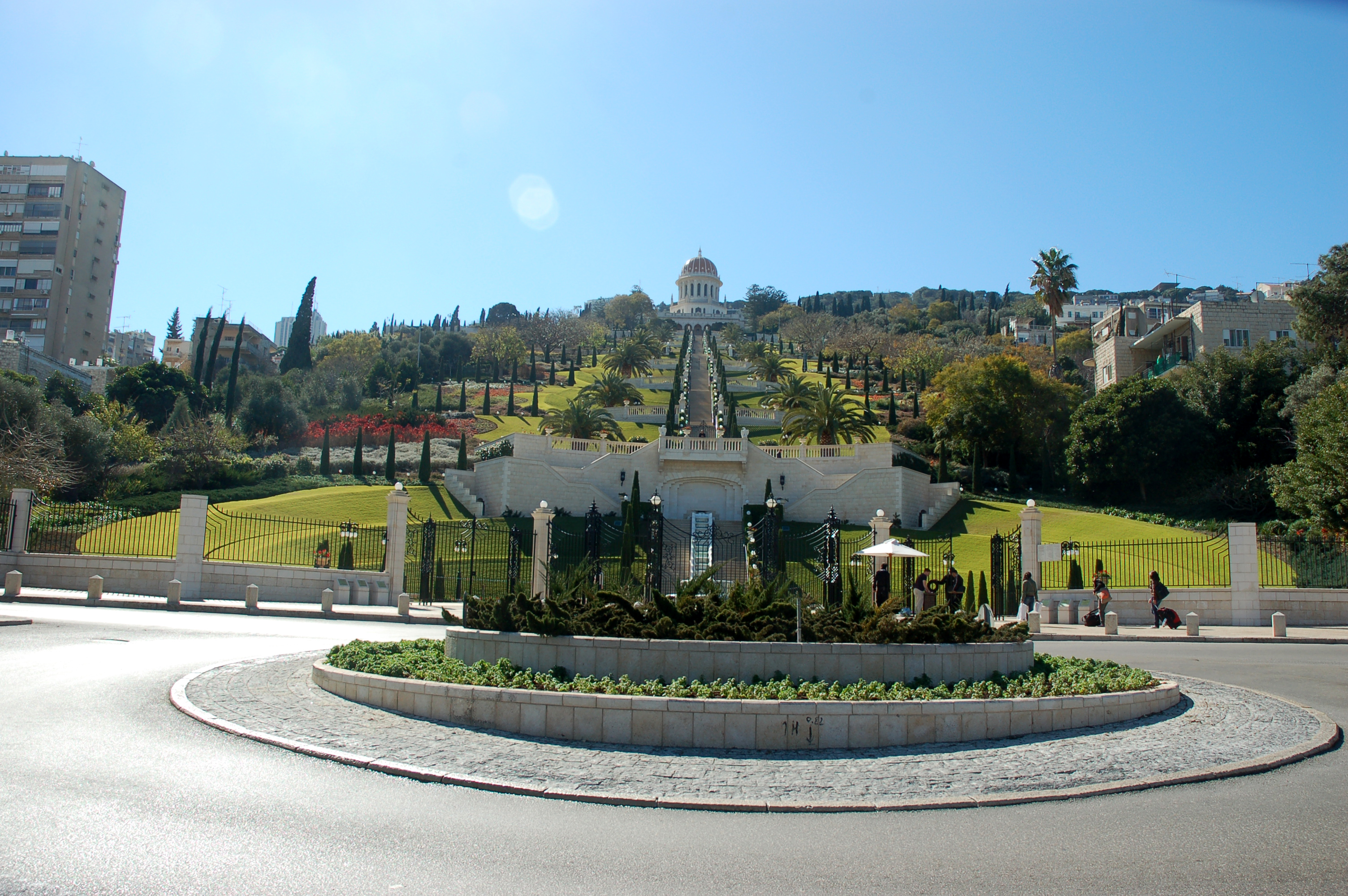
- Interactive map of UNESCO Square for Tolerance and Peace

Location
- Haifa
- Roads at junction: Ben-Gurion Boulevard, HaGeffen Street

Construction
- Type: roundabout

UNESCO Square for Tolerance and Peace (Hebrew: כיכר אונסק"ו לסובלנות ולשלום, romanized: Kikar UNESCO LeSovlanut UleShalom; commonly referred to as UNESCO Square) is a roundabout located in the German Colony in Haifa, Israel. The square is situated at the base of the garden terraces around the Shrine of the Báb on Mount Carmel, at the intersection of Ben-Gurion Boulevard and HaGeffen Street, which leads to the Arab neighborhoods in Haifa's downtown. On its southern side lies the main entrance plaza to the Baháʼí Gardens, and on its northern side begins the German Colony promenade.

The square is named after UNESCO, the United Nations' educational, scientific and cultural organization. It was inaugurated on 9 December 2012, in honor of UNESCO's declaration of the Baháʼí Gardens in Haifa as a World Heritage Site on 8 July 2008, and in celebration of the local Holiday of Holidays festival (Note: Hebrew: החג של החגים, Arabic: مهرجان عيد الأعياد) held on the same date. The inauguration ceremony was attended by Haifa's mayor, Yona Yahav, and the Secretary-General of the worldwide Baháʼí community, Albert Lincoln. During the opening ceremony, dozens of white doves were released throughout the area. On 30 May 2011, a year and a half before the inauguration, a naming ceremony for the square took place, attended by UNESCO's Director-General, Irina Bokova.

== Gallery ==
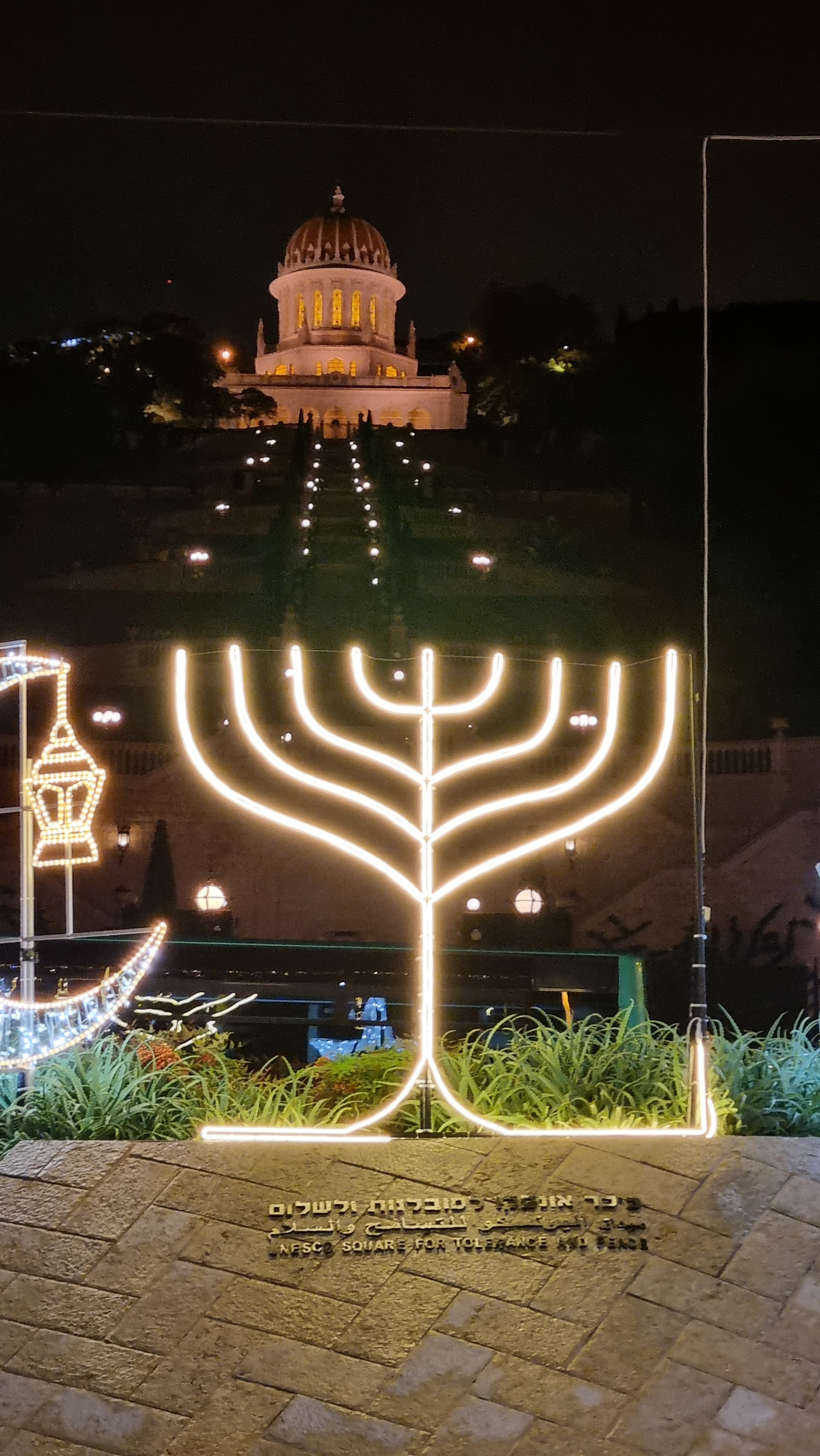
UNESCO Square with the Bahá’í Gardens in the background during the Holiday of Holidays

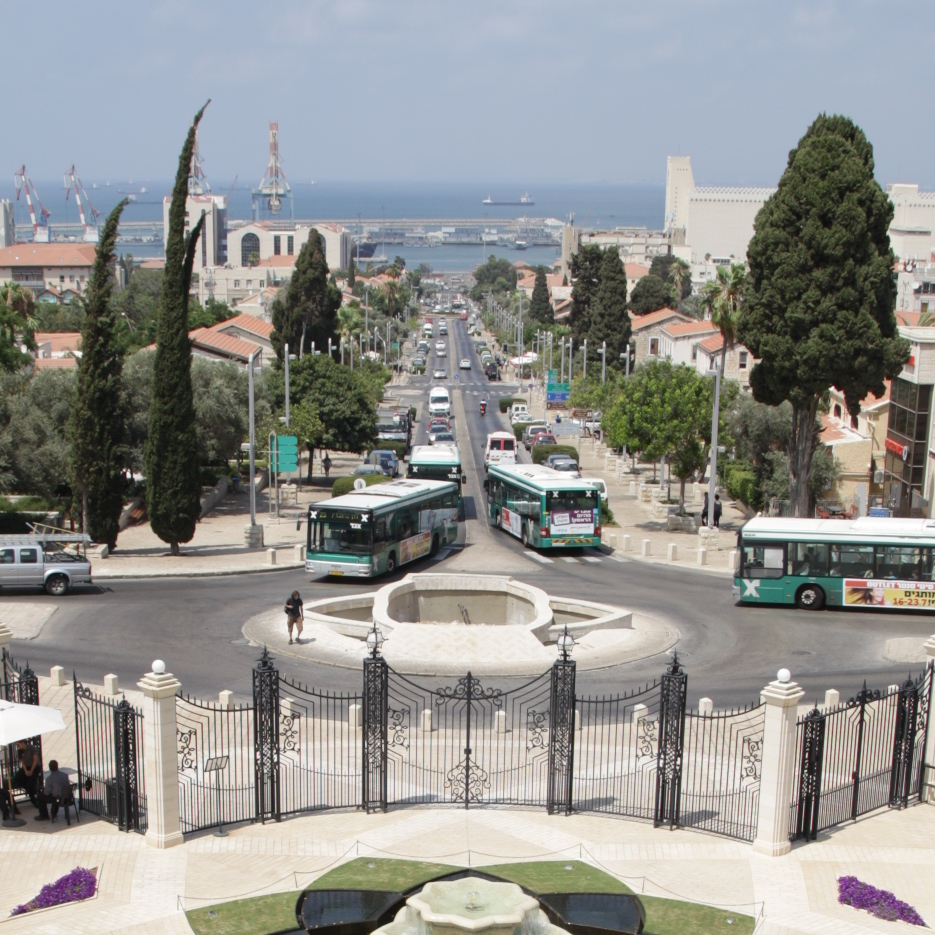
A view from the south side of the square toward Haifa's German Colony

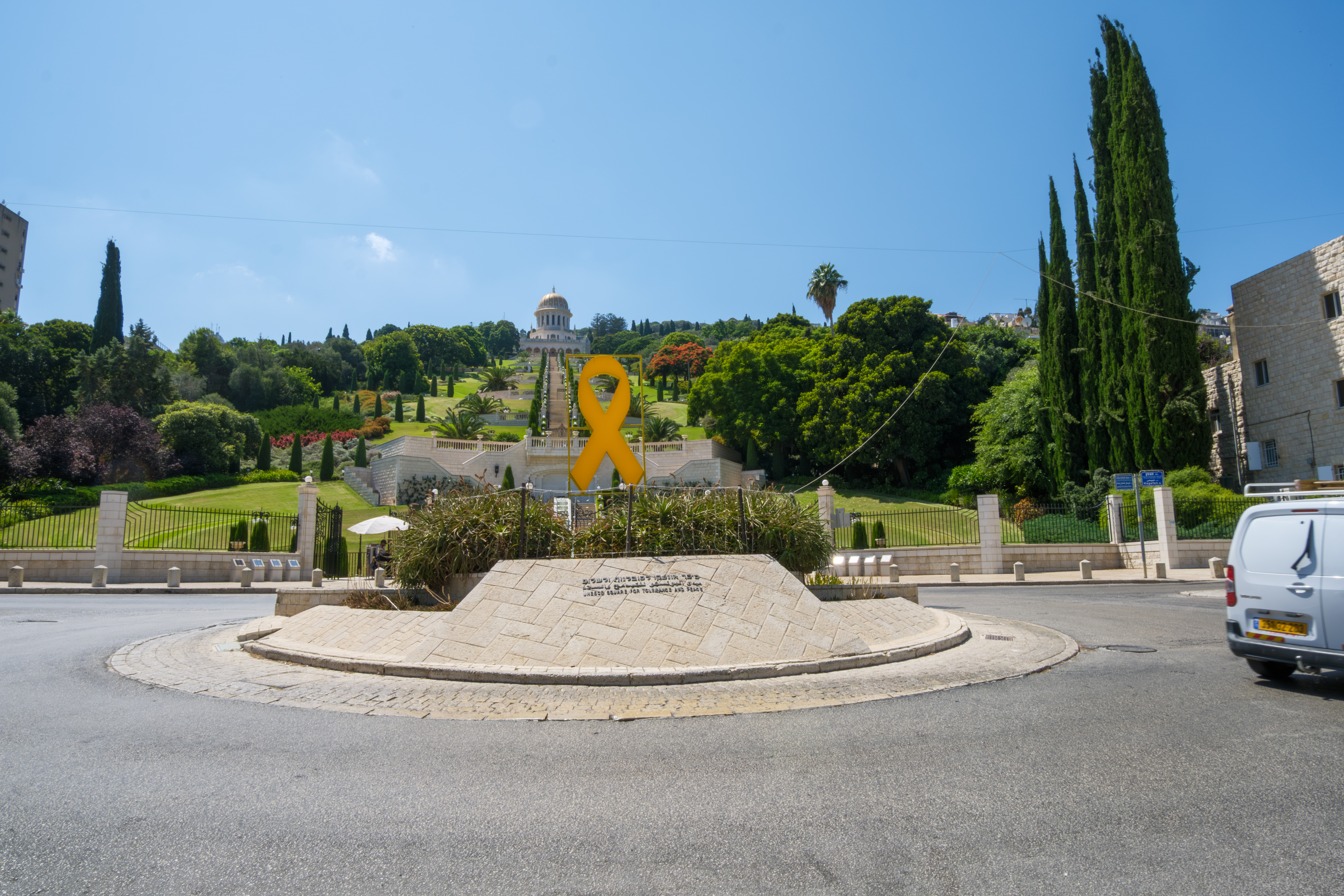
A yellow ribbon in the square calling for the return of the Israeli hostages abducted by Palestinian terrorists to Gaza in the October 7 attacks, 2025
