= Kiryat Eliezer =

Kiryat Eliezer may refer to:

- Kiryat Eliezer, Netanya, a neighborhood in Israel
- Kiryat Eliezer Stadium in Haifa, Israel
- Kiryat Eliezer, Haifa
