= Jane Tolmach =

American politician (1921–2013)

Jane McCormick Tolmach
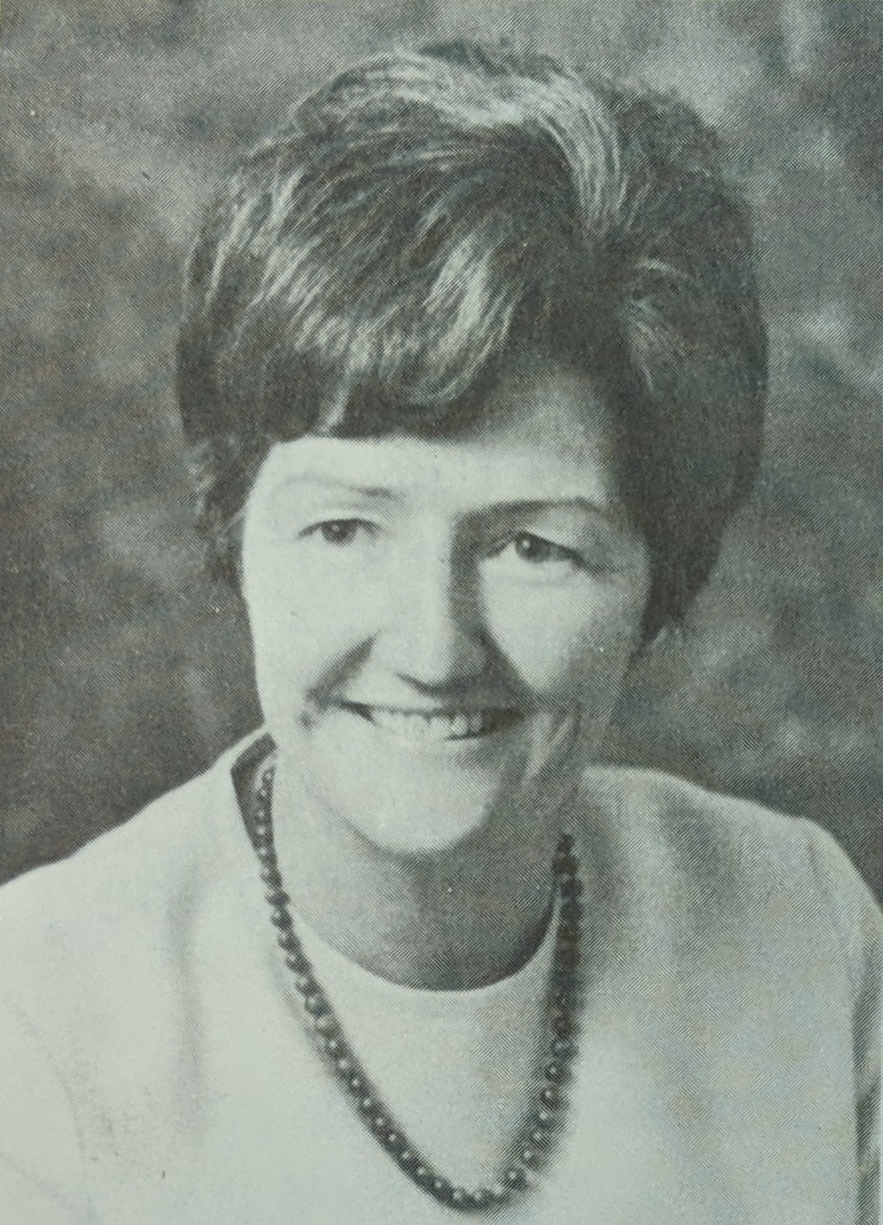
- Jane Tolmach

Mayor of Oxnard, California
- In office 1973–1974
- Preceded by: Donald Miller
- Succeeded by: Tsujio Kato

Personal details
- Born: November 12, 1921 Havre, Montana
- Died: August 23, 2015 (aged 93) Oxnard, California
- Party: Democratic Party
- Spouse: Daniel Tolmach
- Children: 5
- Parents: Burt F. McCormick (father); Vern A. McCormick (mother)
- Education: UCLA, Smith College
- Occupation: Politician
- Known for: First woman mayor of Oxnard, California

Jane Tolmach (1921–2015) is a former American politician in California. Tolmach was the first woman to be mayor of Oxnard, California.

== Life ==
Her father, Burt F. McCormick was a first-generation Irish immigrant who arrived in the US at the age of 1. Jane McCormick Tolmach's family moved to Ventura County when she was two years old, first settling in Santa Paula and later in Ventura. She graduated from Ventura High School.

Though it was uncommon for women at the time, Jane was encouraged to attend college. She graduated from UCLA in 1943 and Smith College a few years later with a degree in Social Work. Jane worked for the Red Cross in Baltimore and at the Corona Naval Base, where she met her future husband. In 1948 she married Dr. Daniel M. Tolmach and the couple settled in Oxnard. Dr. Tolmach (1915-2003) was the first pediatrician in Oxnard.

== Politics ==
Mother of five children, Jane became active in politics hosting coffee-fundraisers for Democratic presidential hopeful Senator Estes Kefauver (TN). She supported Adlai Stevenson for the nomination in 1956, attending the first in a long line of Democratic National Conventions. Tolmach was an early supporter of California Governor Edmund "Pat" Brown, organizing pro-Brown rallies during the 1958 gubernatorial election.

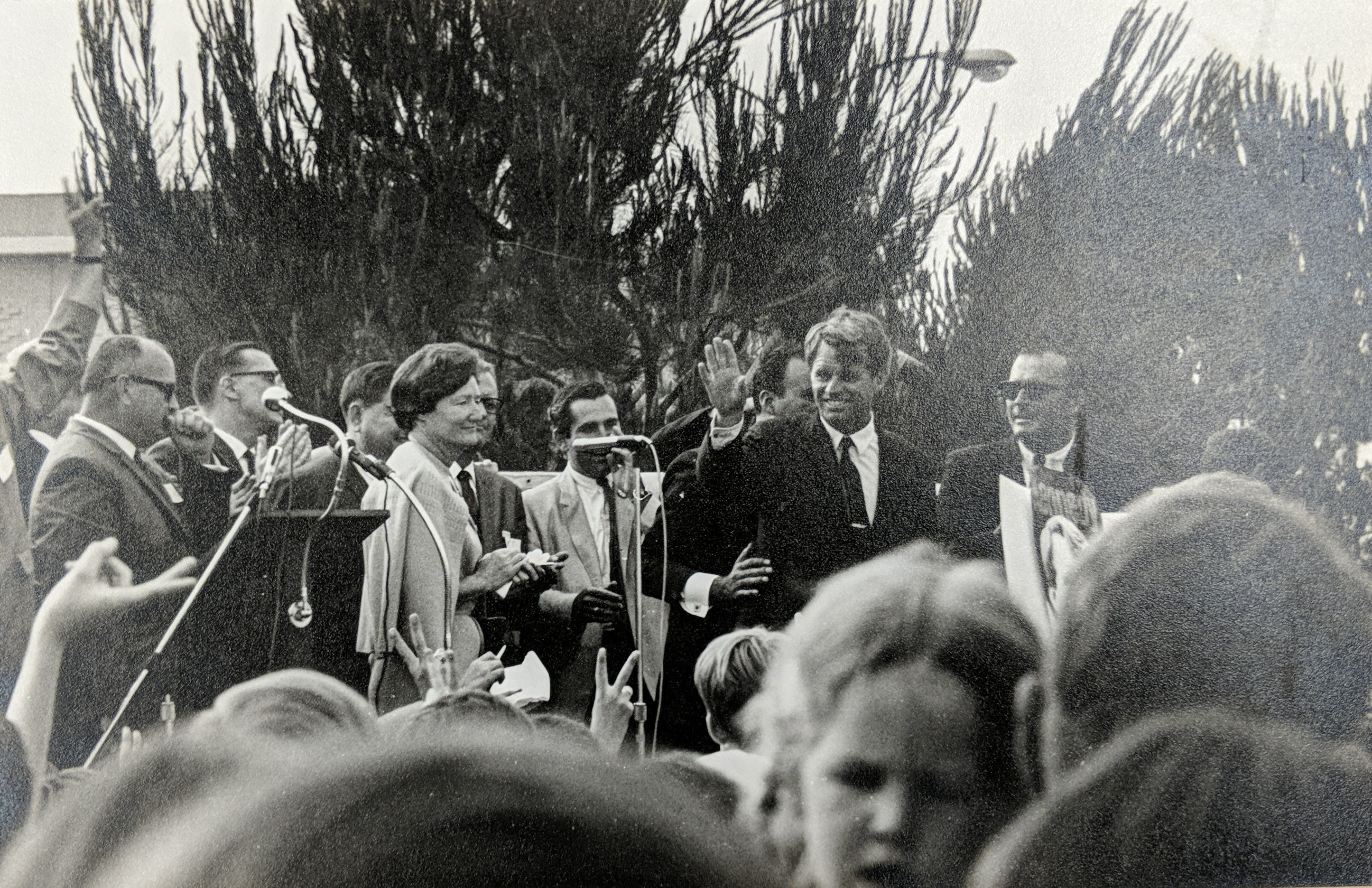
Jane Tolmach hosted a campaign event in Oxnard, CA, with Robert Kennedy the day before he was assassinated in Los Angeles. Tolmach was the only woman on the dais.

Jane supported John Kennedy's election in 1960 and Robert F. Kennedy's candidacy in 1968. She was fundamentally shaken by the assassination of RFK in Los Angeles, the day after she appeared with him at a campaign event in Oxnard. As a result, she turned her intellect and interest toward local issues.

"I never wanted to run for office myself," Tolmach told the Los Angeles Times in 1997, "But then, after supporting some candidates that were disappointing after they ran and being asked to run a few times, I started to think about it."

Tolmach served on the Oxnard City Council for eight years (1970-1978) and served as the mayor of Oxnard in 1973-1974, the first woman to do either of those things. In 1976 she ran unsuccessfully for the State Assembly, losing in an upset to Republican newcomer Charles Imbrecht, despite endorsements from Governor Jerry Brown, former Governor Pat Brown, and LA Mayor Tom Bradley.

== Law school ==
In 1981 she returned to law school to learn the intricacies of municipal law. She successfully fought a planned liquefied natural gas facility planned for Oxnard, sought to ease tensions between police and minority communities, and helped to stop development of a major casino in Oxnard.

== Oxnard politics ==
Jane remained active in Oxnard politics, supporting the victorious special election campaign of Bert Perello to the Oxnard City Council in 2013. She accompanied him to his swearing-in ceremony at Oxnard City Hall. Upon her death, August 27, 2013, her children agreed to donate her political records and memorabilia to California State University Channel Islands.

== Personal life ==
Tolmach's husband was Daniel Tolmach (died 2003). They have five children. Tolmach and her family lived in Oxnard, California.

On August 23, 2015, Tolmach died in Oxnard, California. She was 93 years old.

== See also ==
- List of mayors of Oxnard, California
