= List of mayors of Oxnard, California =

Mayor of Oxnard
- Flag of Oxnard
- Term length: 4 years
- Formation: 1903
- First holder: Richard Barrett Haydock

This is a list of mayors of Oxnard, California.

The city's first mayor was Richard B. Haydock who led the effort to build the city's Carnegie library, now known as the Carnegie Art Museum.

The city's longest-serving mayor was Manuel M. Lopez who was mayor for 12 years from 1992 to 2004.

The current mayor is Luis McArthur, voted into office in November 2024 after retiring as an Oxnard Police Commander. He served 35 years on the police force.

#	Image	Name	Term	Notes	Sources
1		Richard Barrett Haydock	1903–1906	Born 1857 in Smithland, Kentucky. Oxnard's first mayor. He led the effort to build the city's Carnegie library, now known as the Carnegie Art Museum.	
2		S. B. Bagnall	1906–1910		
3		Joseph Sailer	1910–1920	Born in Austria c. 1867.	
4		Hubert H. Eastwood	1920–1926	Born in England c. 1870.	
5		E. Gerrie Driffill	1926–1928		
6		A. B. Westfield	1928–1929		
7		E. Roy Gill	1929–1937		
8		Fred Snodgrass	1937–1938	Born in Ventura in 1887. Played Major League Baseball as an outfielder for the New York Giants and Boston Braves from 1908 to 1916. Best known for having dropped a fly ball that cost the Giants the final game of the 1912 World Series. After retiring from baseball, he returned to California, bought a ranch in the El Rio area of Oxnard where he grew lemons and apricots, sold iceless refrigerators and other home appliances for Kelvinator, served as mayor of Oxnard in 1937, and moved to Ventura in 1938. Died in 1974 in Ventura.	
9		W. Roy Guyer	1938–1942	Born 1885 in Michigan	
10		Hubert H. Eastwood (2nd term)	1942–1944	See above	
11		Edwin L. Carty	1944–1950	Born 1897 in Santa Barbara. Worked as a real estate broker and developer. He was credited with leading many of the city's developments, including Channel Islands Harbor. He served as mayor from 1944 to 1950. Later served as a county supervisor 1950–1965. Died 1990.	
12		A. Elliott Stoll	1950–1951	Born in South Dakota in 1916. A dentist by profession, he left position as mayor for military service; returned to the post in 1954. Died in 1996.	
13		Rudolph Beck	1951–1954		
14		A. Elliott Stoll (2nd term)	1954–1956	See above	
15		Carl E. Ward	1956–1960		
16		C. E. Davidson	1960–1962		
17		Robert F. Howlett	1962–1966	Born 1902, died January 27, 1990, in Oxnard.	
18		William "Bill" Soo Hoo	1966–1970	First Chinese-American mayor in California. He was also the first Oxnard native to serve as mayor. He died in 1990 in Oxnard.	
19		Salvatore Sanchez Jr.	1970–1971	Born c. 1927 in Los Angeles. A teacher by profession. The first Latino to serve as Oxnard's mayor. Died in 2014 at his home in Oxnard.	
20		R. H. "Bud" Roussey	1971	Born 6 November 1912 in Oxnard. Died in Oxnard on 9 May 2005.	
21		Donald H. Miller	1971–1972		
22		E. "Al" Jewell	1972–1973		
23		Jane Tolmach	1973–1974	Born in Havre, Montana, and moved to Ventura County at age two. A social worker and community activist for many years. The first and still only woman mayor of Oxnard, serving from 1973 to 1974. She also served on City Council starting in 1970. Died in 2015.	
24		E. "Al" Jewell (2nd term)	1974–1976		
25		Tsujio Kato	1976–1982	Born in Oxnard in 1938. He spent World War II with his family at the Gila River internment camp. He became a dentist and opened a practice in Oxnard in 1965. He served on City Council 1972-1976 and as mayor 1976–1982. He is credited with having led Oxnard's California Strawberry Festival to national prominence.	
26		Nao Takasugi	1982–1992	Born 1922 in Oxnard, his parents operated Asahi Market. Spent a portion of World War II at the Gila River internment camp. Served on City Council 1976-1982 and as mayor for 10 years from 1982 to 1992. Later served in the California Assembly 1992–1998. Died in 2009.	
27		Manuel M. Lopez	1992–2004	Began practice as an optometrist in Oxnard in 1962. Served on City Council starting in 1978. Elected as mayor in 1992, 1994, 1996, 1998, 2000, and 2002. Later served as a commissioner for the Port of Hueneme. At 12 years, he had the longest tenure as mayor in Oxnard history.	
28		Thomas E. Holden	2004–2012	An optometrist by profession, the second consecutive optometrist to serve as mayor of Oxnard. Served on City Council, 1993–2002. Elected as mayor in 2004, 2006, 2008, and 2010	
29		Timothy B. Flynn	2012–2020	Teacher of German and social science in the Oxnard Union High School District and political science at Oxnard College. Elected as mayor in 2012, 2014, and 2016.	
30		John C. Zaragoza	2020–2024	Former Ventura County Supervisor and former Oxnard City Council member.	
31		Luis McArthur	2024–present	Retired after 35 years on the Oxnard Police Department to become Mayor.	
