= Einat Kalisch-Rotem =

Mayor of Haifa (born 1970)

Einat Kalisch
- עינת קליש
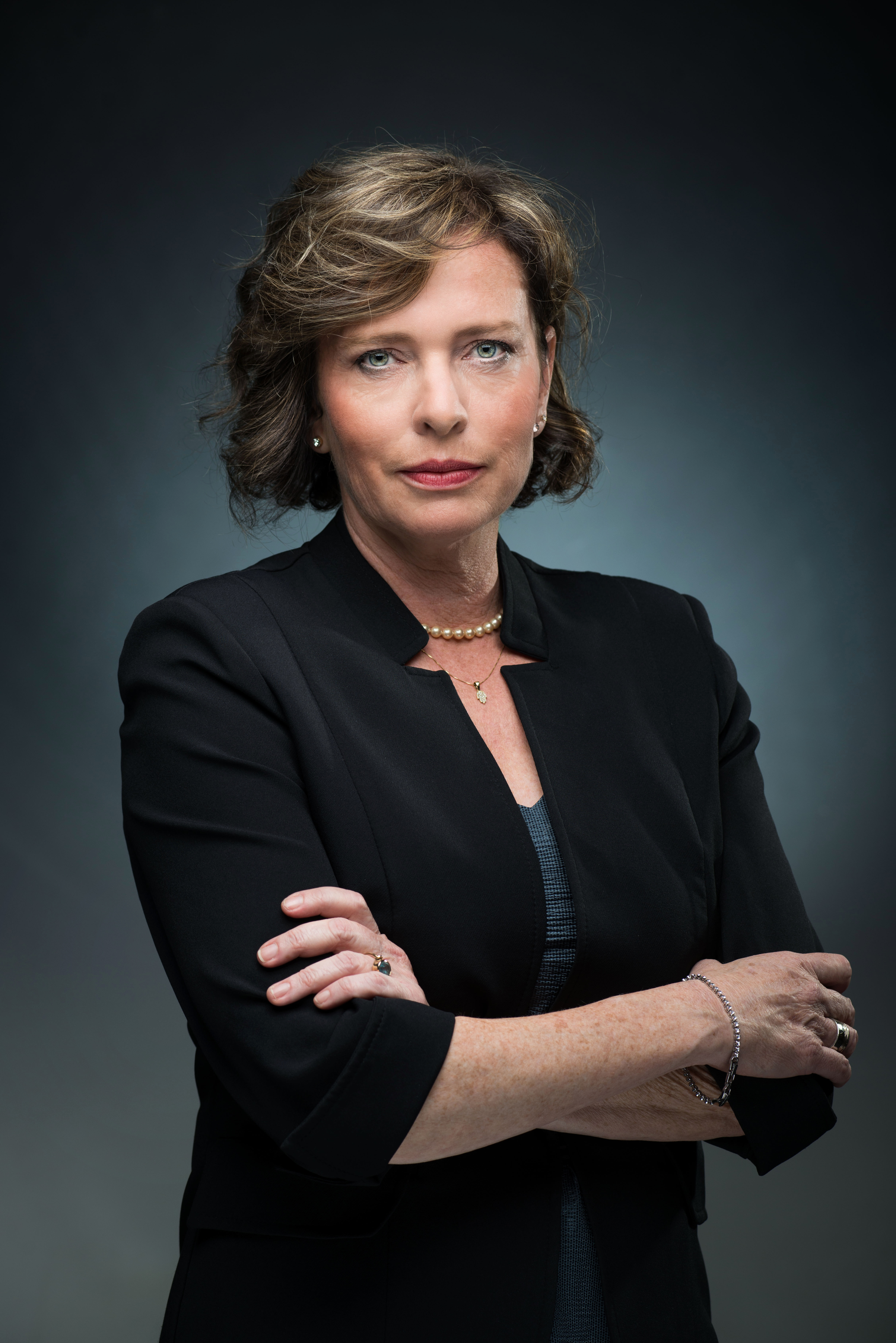

Mayor of Haifa
- In office 20 November 2018 – 31 March 2024
- Preceded by: Yona Yahav
- Succeeded by: Yona Yahav

Personal details
- Born: 3 September 1970 (age 56) Haifa, Israel
- Party: Labour
- Children: 2
- Education: Technion; ETH Zurich
- Occupation: Urban planner

Einat Kalisch-Rotem (Hebrew: עינת קליש-רותם; born 3 September 1970, Haifa) is an Israeli urban planner and politician who served as mayor of Haifa from 2018 to 2024. She was the first female mayor to lead any of the three major cities in Israel.

== Early life and career ==
Kalisch was born, raised, and educated in Haifa. Her father, Avraham, was a researcher and lecturer at the Technion's material engineering department, and at the Shmuel Na'am institution. As a youth, she studied at the Alliance All Israel Friends high school, where she was active in the student council. During her military service, Kalisch served in the Israeli Air Force as a research diagnostician. Her brother died at the age of 19 from cancer, and a year later, her mother died of cancer at 54.

In 1995, Kalisch earned her Bachelor's in Architecture from the Technion, and in 2001, she earned her Master's in Urban Planning from the Technion. In 2007, she completed her PhD in Urban Planning from ETH Zurich in Switzerland. From 1996-2012, she taught at Tel Aviv University and at the Technion.

In the year 2012, Kalisch established the "Metvah Eroni" firm for planning cities and regions, together with architect Yael Sion-Geist. The firm continues its professional activities under the management of Sion-Geist after Kalisch became mayor of Haifa in October 2018. The company prepared the outline plans for the development of Majdal Shams, Yarka, and Kibbutz Meirav. She won an award and a commendation for a project proposal she submitted to the High Line in Manhattan. In 2004, she hosted and produced several programs of "House Stories - The Development of Architecture in Tel Aviv", for the Teva HaHavid channel.

In 2007, she won a prize from the Ministry of Environmental Protection's Green Building competition's "restoration of existing textures and the built environment" category. In the year 2010, Kalisch won the prize in the "Reusing the water towers" category in the competition held by the Council for Conservation of Heritage Sites in Israel and the Bezalel Academy of Arts and Design.

== Public career ==
In 2011, Kalisch was elected as chairwoman of the Architects' Association of Haifa and to the executive committee of the Coalition for Public Health. In the following year, she led, together with Gila Zamir and Nitzan Kloch, a campaign to find a solution for the route of the railways in Haifa to allow a greater opening of the sea for the city.

Kalisch first ran for Mayor of Haifa in 2013. She won 14% of the vote, coming in third place behind Yaakov Borowski and incumbent Yona Yahav.

She was convicted in March 2018 of violating the Planning and Construction Law in the Court for Local Affairs in Hadera, regarding the construction of a private house in Zichron Yaakov, which was built without a building permit and fined 30,000 ILS.

In the municipal elections of 2018 held in October, she and her party were disqualified from running in the elections according to the decision of the Elections Administration, after the Labor Party's lawyer signed both her forms and those of the "Lovers of Haifa" list run by Yisrael Savyon of the Labor Party. This created a situation in which two lists represented the Labor Party in the elections in the city, in violation of the election law. In response, Kalisch-Rotem and several organizations submitted a petition to the Haifa District Court, but the petition was rejected. In the appeal filed with the High Court of Justice, her appeal was accepted, and it was determined that she was entitled to contend because she acted in good faith.

In the 2018 Haifa mayoral election, she defeated Yona Yahav with 56% of the vote.

=== Mayor of Haifa ===
Kalisch has put the development of Haifa airport as one of the main points in her platform. In March 2019, after a struggle with other institutions in Haifa, an agreement with the Ministry of Transportation was reached to allow for the airport's runway to be lengthened, but not to the length that Kalisch campaigned for.

During her first year in office, she continued to hold conferences intended for public participation in various issues such as clearing and construction in the neighborhoods of Kiryat Eliezer and Kiryat Haim Mizrahit as well as on the issues of feeding cats and establishing a "pig patrol" in order to reduce the damage caused by wild pigs. In addition, it worked with the "Tovvan" company on an internet platform to receive feedback from the public regarding various urban programs (dog parks, rehabilitation of water parks, bicycle paths, etc.) and the "2030 Administration" was established, with the aim of formulating a strategy for the renewal of the city of Haifa for the coming years on a variety of issues.

Kalisch promoted the parking project according to which you can park for free for 20 minutes in selected areas of the city.

In July 2021, a coalition crisis broke out. Most of the members of the city council signed a document in which there was an attack against her. Unusually, the city council approved a proposed resolution calling for her to resign. Following the move, Attorney David Etzioni resigned, and her two other deputies, Shahira Shelvi and Lazar Kaplan, were fired and in their place opposition members Sofi Nakash, Shimshon Ido and Avihu Han were appointed as deputies by the council. The salary of two of her substitutes and her deputy: Michi Alper and Nachshon Tzuk was denied. Kalisch was left with an opposing council, in which she does not have a majority, and her ability to promote moves within the scope of her position is limited.

After five years in office as mayor, in 2024 Haifa mayoral election, she received only 4.5% of the votes and was eliminated from the race. In the end, Yona Yahav was elected.

== Personal life ==
Kalisch has a black belt in karate.

She is married to Boaz Kalisch, a mechanical engineer specializing in medical technologies, and they have two sons. She lives in the Ramot Sapir neighborhood in Haifa.
