= Johanne Glomstad =

Danish colonial official

Johanne Dorothea Glomstad (1756-1835) was a Danish businesswoman and colonial official. She had the office købmand or kolonibestyrer ("Merchant or Colonial Administrator") of the colonial city of Jakobshavn (Ilulissat) on Danish Greenland between April and July 1788. She succceded her husband to the office. She was the only woman to have ruled a Danish colony.

== Life and career ==
Johanne Dorothea Glomstad was born in the village Kvernes outside of Trondhjem in Danish Norway to the wealthy landowner merchand and official Gert Christensen Mechlenborg (1734-1796).

In 1783 she was bethrothed to the Danish lawyer merchant and official Jens Peter Hansen Glomstad (1752-1788) in Copenhagen. The same year, her fiance travelled to the danish colony of Greenland, were he was in 1784 appointed to the office købmand or kolonibestyrer ("Merchant or Colonial Administrator"), essentially governor or mayor, in the colony and city of Jakobshavn (later named Ilulissat). In 1785, Johanne Glomstad travelled to the colony in order to marry her fiance. Her trip was financed by Royal Greenland Trading Department, and she was married on her arrival to her fiance by Jørgen Sverdrup. On her arrival, she was the only fully Danish woman in the area in a colony consisting of Danish men and their half Danish-Inuit wives. She had a son during her marriage.

When she was widowed on 8 April 1788, the office of her late spouse was vacant, and his former superior inspector Jens Wille appointed his widow Johanne Glomstad to fill the vacancy of the office. She thereby became the first and only woman to rule a Danish colony. At the time however this was not regarded as controversial, since a widow continuing the business or profession of her late husband was viewed as a noncontroversial temporary holder of a vacancy in the name of her husband, and not truly as a woman acting in her own right.

In July 1788, she returned to Copenhagen and later to Norway. In 1792, she remarried merchant Jørgen Rendtler (1750-1833).

== See also ==
- Catherine Malotteau
