= Rosina ǁHoabes =

Namibian politician

Mayor of Swakopmund
- In office December 2015 - ? 2 December 2010 - 16 November 2012; January 2003 - 2008

Personal details
- Born: c. 1961 (age 64–65) Otavi, Otjozondjupa, Namibia
- Party: SWAPO
- Children: 3
- Education: Rhodes University

Rosina ǁHoabes (Note: The ǁ character represents a tenuis lateral click in the Khoisan languages and is sometimes rendered as // in text) (born c. 1961) is a Namibian politician.

== Career ==
Rosina ǁHoabes was a full-time advisor on biology, life sciences and natural sciences education at the Khorixas Regional Education Office prior to becoming a politician. She is married with three children. ǁHoabes was also studying part-time for a master's degree when she was first elected mayor of Swakopmund, Namibia's fourth largest city in January 2003. On 16 November 2004 she was appointed a member of the national housing advisory committee for a three-year term by Minister of Regional and Local Government and Housing, Joel Kaapanda. During ǁHoabes' first tenure as mayor, the city's 1882 jetty was refurbished at a cost of N$4 million, having been closed for seven years on safety grounds. The reopened structure housed shops, tourist facilities and a bar.

ǁHoabes was re-elected mayor of Swakopmund in May 2007 but was out of office by 2008. ǁHoabes was president of Association of Local Authorities of Namibia in 2009. She stood for a seat as councillor representing the SWAPO party in 2010, she was successful and was re-elected mayor by the council on 2 December 2010. In June 2012, as mayor, ǁHoabes launched the Namibia's Coast: ocean riches and desert treasures book on behalf of the Minister of Environment and Tourism, Netumbo Nandi-Ndaitwah.

She was out of office again by 16 November 2012 when she was elected chairperson of the municipality's management committee. In 2015 she raised water, sewerage, refuse, and housing rates to pay for new capital expenditure on council centres, museums, public buildings, sewerage and road works. ǁHoabes lost out in the first round of the April 2015 SWAPO internal elections for mayor to Juuso Kambueshe but was elected mayor again in December 2015. She was also appointed chairperson of the Retirement Fund for Local Authorities and Utility Service in Namibia (RFLAUN) in 2015. ǁHoabes was in consideration for the Africa Travel Association's World Mayor Awards. As of 2017, she does not hold a seat on the Swakopmund council.

In 2025, Hoabes was assignes as ambassador of Japan and still working as ambassador there.
