= Yona Yahav =

Israeli lawyer and politician (born 1944)

- יונה יהב
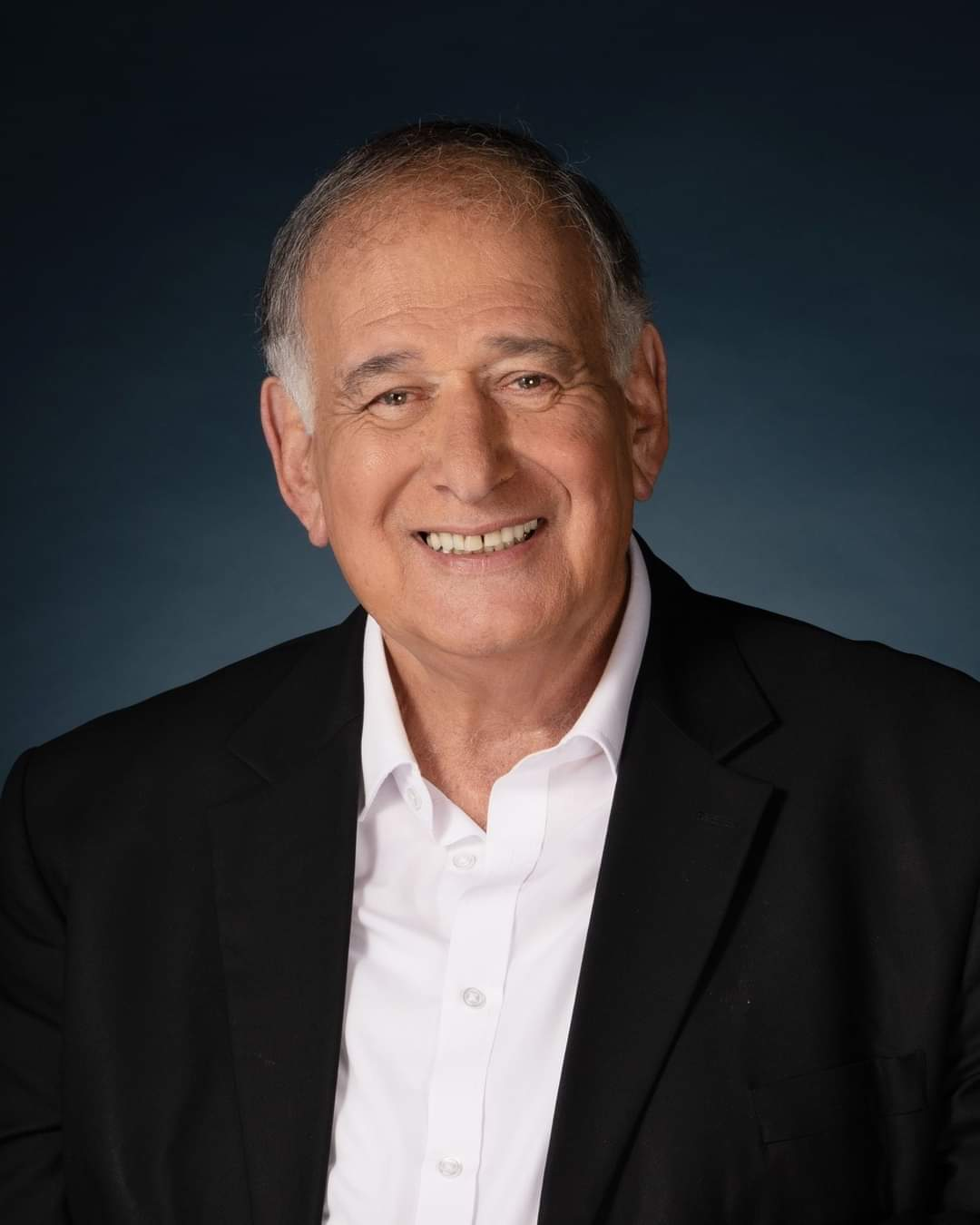

Mayor of Haifa
- Incumbent
- Assumed office 2024
- Preceded by: Einat Kalisch-Rotem
- In office 2003–2018
- Preceded by: Giora Fisher (acting)
- Succeeded by: Einat Kalisch-Rotem

Faction represented in the Knesset
- 1996–1999: Labor Party

Personal details
- Born: 19 June 1944 (age 82) Haifa, Mandatory Palestine

Yona Yahav (Hebrew: יונה יהב; born 19 June 1944) is an Israeli lawyer and politician currently serving as the mayor of Haifa since 2024. Yahav previously served as Mayor from 2003 and, 2018, when he lost re-election to Einat Kalisch-Rotem. In 2024, Yahav was re-elected as Mayor, defeating David Etzioni. Yahav also served as a member of the Knesset for Labor from 1996 to 1999.

== Biography ==
Yahav was born in Haifa during the period of Mandatory Palestine, as a son of an immigrant from Cologne, Germany. During his national service he reached the rank of lieutenant colonel in the Military Police Corps of the IDF. He studied law at the Hebrew University of Jerusalem, gaining a LL.B, before continuing his legal studies at the University of London, where he served as secretary-general of the World Union of Jewish Students.

When he returned to Israel, Yahav became active in politics. He was an advisor to Minister of Transport Gad Yaacobi and the spokesman of Teddy Kollek, mayor of Jerusalem. In 1996 he was elected to the Knesset on the Labor Party list, and served as the chairman of the subcommittee for banking. However, he lost his seat in the 1999 elections.

Yahav later left Labour and joined Shinui. In 2003, he was elected mayor of Haifa on a joint Shinui-Greens ticket, having already served as deputy mayor. On 29 June 2006 he defected to Kadima, but remained mayor of the city. He is also chairman of the Haifa Economic Corporation and previously chaired the Haifa International Film Festival organisation and the city's theatre executive. In the 2018 Haifa mayoral election, he lost to Einat Kalisch-Rotem, who garnered 56% of the votes. However, in the following elections, in 2024, he ran again and defeated David Etzioni by winning 62% of the votes.

== Published works ==
- The Anatomy of the Fall of the Labor Party with Shevah Weiss (1977)
- Libel and Slander (1987, updated and re-released in 1996)
