= Souad Abderrahim =

Tunisian politician

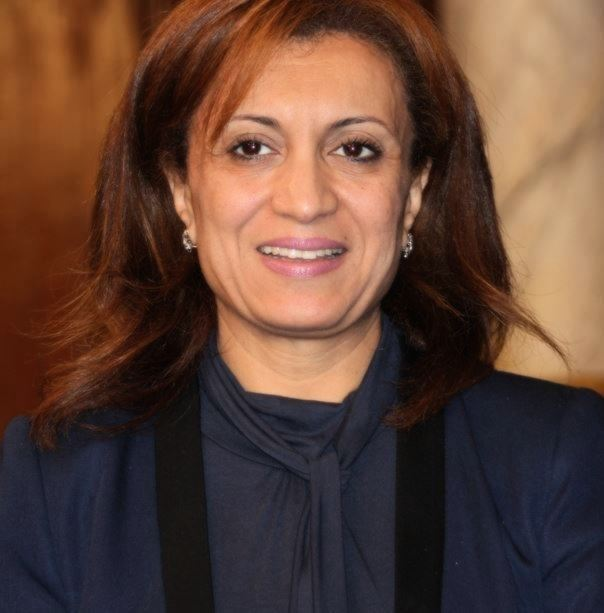

Mayor of Tunis
- Incumbent
- Assumed office July 3, 2018
- Preceded by: Seifallah Lasram

Personal details
- Political party: Ennahda Movement

Souad Abderrahim (born 1964) is a Tunisian politician. She was elected as the mayor of Tunis, Tunisia's capital, on July 3, 2018. She is a member of the Islamist Ennahda Movement, and the first woman to serve as Tunis's mayor.

== Life ==
She is a native of Métouia. She studied at the Lycée Khaznadar in the suburbs of Tunis. She wore the veil during her years of study at the Faculty of Medicine of Monastir. She began to campaign and meet with activists such as Ajmi Lourimi, who later became a member of Ennahdha's political bureau. She was also a member of the executive Board of the Tunisian General Union of Students (UGTE).

Her militant involvement earned her 15 days of imprisonment in 1985, while she tried to calm a violent quarrel between students. She was forced to leave the faculty and later resumed her studies in pharmacy at Monastir. In 1991, she began a militant course; her activism earned her an arrest and imprisonment as an opponent of the régime.

She did not start overt political activity until after the 14 January 2011 revolution.

She joined the Islamist party Ennahdha, following a meeting of the UGTE, over which she presided and where party leaders were present. The political bureau of Ennahdha then contacted her to bring her into the party.

On 23 October 2011, she was elected to the Constituent Assembly, for Ennahdha representing of Tunis. She chairs the parliamentary Committee on Human Rights and Freedoms.

On 9 November 2011, she declared in a debate on Monte Carlo Doualiya that freedoms must be "framed by customs, traditions and respect for good morals"; she illustrated her point by denouncing single mothers, "an infamy, a plague on Tunisian society", which "should not aspire to a legal framework that protects their rights". She was then dubbed "Souad Palin", in reference to Sarah Palin.

She was an Ennahdha candidate for the City Council of Tunis in the municipal elections of 2018. On 3 July, she was elected by 26 votes of the Municipality Council members, with 22 voting against. She became the first woman elected mayor of Tunis and the first Arab woman to hold such a position.
