= Sylvia Muzila =

Motswana politician

Sylvia Muzila Her Worship

Mayor of Francistown
- Preceded by: James Kgalajwe
- Succeeded by: Godisang Radisigo

Special Councillor, Francistown City Council

Personal details
- Born: Sylvia Tabitha Nlea Dombodema, Zimbabwe
- Party: Botswana Democratic Party (BDP)
- Education: University of Birmingham
- Awards: Botswana's Presidential Order of Meritorious Service in 2005

Sylvia Muzila (at times referred to as Sylvia Tabitha Muzila née Nlea) is a Motswana politician and first female mayor of Francistown, Botswana. Politically affiliated to the Botswana Democratic Party (BDP), she was elected to this position in 2014 and served up till 2019. Muzila was also among the first cohort of women to be recruited in the then Botswana Police Force.

== Background and education ==
Muzila was born Sylvia Tabitha Nlea in Dombodema, Zimbabwe. She has a degree in Urban Development in addition to a Master's of Social science degree in Development Administration which she obtained in 1989 from the University of Birmingham in the United Kingdom.

== Career ==
Muzila was among the first eight women to join Botswana Police Service in Francistown in 1971 which she left in 1978 She then joined the Selebi Phikwe Town Council as a Community Clerk and was then transferred to the Self Help Housing Agency (SHHA). After her Masters studies, she served as a Housing Officer in Botswana's Ministry of Lands and Housing.

Between 1996 and 2008, Muzila was the District Commissioner, first for Gaborone, before being appointed to Kweneng, the North East and finally Francistown in 2008.

Muzila joined active politics in 2008. In December 2014, on the ticket of the Botswana Democratic Party (BDP), Muzila was elected unopposed for her first two and a half-year term as the first female Mayor of Francistown after other party Councillors withdrew from the mayoral race. She was re-elected unopposed to the same position in 2017

She is also the owner of Thabitha Secondary School in Francistown.

== Personal life ==
Muzila was married to Robert Muzila, a Francistown councillor, whom she divorced in 2009.

== Awards ==
Muzila was a recipient of Botswana's Presidential Order of Meritorious Service in 2005.

== See also ==
- Francistown
- Botswana Democratic Party
