= Cecilia Oba =

Cecilia Oba Tito
- Born: 1974; Yei, South Sudan
- Died: November 9, 2014 (aged 40); Jebel, South Sudan
- Occupation: Politician

Cecilia Oba Tito was the first woman mayor of Yei in South Sudan. Elected in 2013, Oba was killed in a homicide on 9 November 2014.

== Early life ==
In 1974, Oba was born in Morsak Village, Yei, as a member of the Kakwa tribe. From 1981 to 1987, Oba attended Kagelu Primary School. From 1987 to 1991, she attended Yei Girl's Secondary School, but she relocated to Uganda due to war, attending Nyangilia Secondary School in West Nile. After graduation in 1994, Oba did a Social Development course for one year at the Nsameji National Institute.

== Career ==
Oba served as Central Equatoria state's minister for cabinet affairs. Elected deputy of the National Assembly of Sudan, she was involved in drafting the Constitution of South Sudan. Oba was elected as mayor in 2013 and dismissed from the post in September 2014.

== Death ==
Oba and her office manager Emmanuel Lemi were murdered on 9 November 2014 in Jebel, at the age of 40. On 14 November, four people were arrested in connection with the double homicide. The government stated in November 2015 that investigation was ongoing.

== Beliefs ==
Oba was a Christian. She supported education rights for women.
