= 2018 Haifa mayoral election =

- 30 October 2018
- Turnout: 48.85%
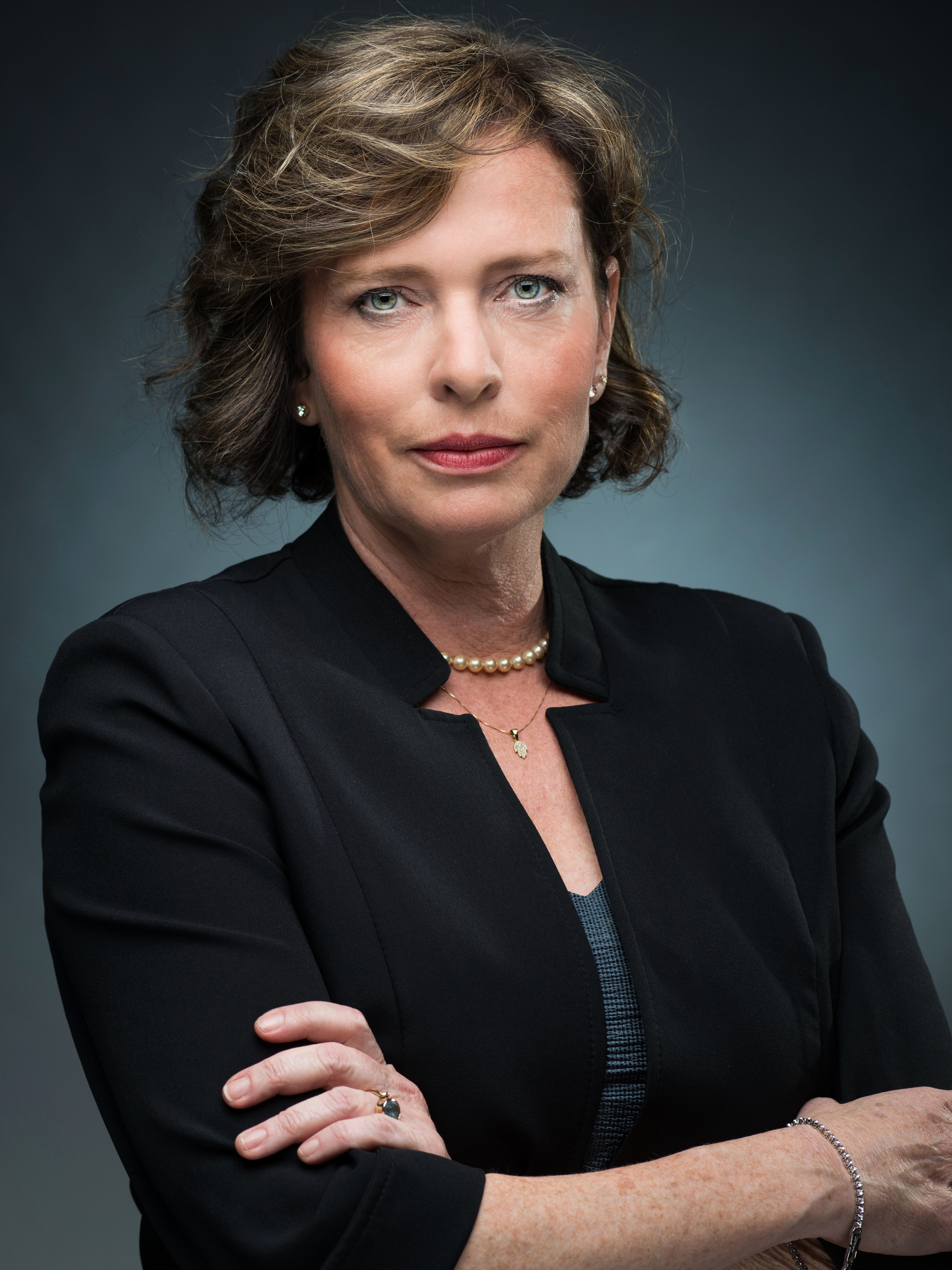

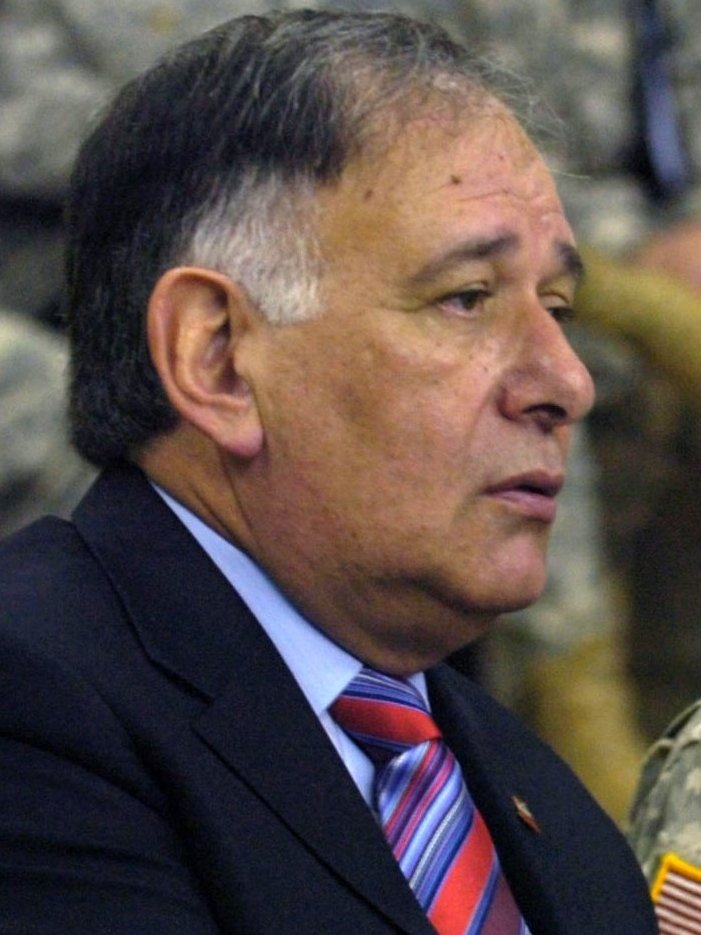
Candidate	Einat Kalisch-Rotem	Yona Yahav
Party	Living in Haifa	Yona Yahav and Haifa's Youth
Popular vote	66,486	43,907
Percentage	56.21%	37.12%
Mayor before election
Yona Yahav
Yona Yahav and Haifa's Youth
Elected mayor
Einat Kalisch-Rotem
Living in Haifa

The 2018 Haifa mayoral election was held on 30 October 2018 to elect the mayor of Haifa. It saw the election of Einat Kalisch-Rotem, who unseated incumbent mayor Yona Yahav. Kalisch-Rotem became the first female mayor of Haifa, making Haifa the largest city in Israel, and first major Israeli city, to ever have a female mayor.

The election was part of the 2018 Israeli municipal elections.

== Candidates ==
- Avihu Han (Haifa Greens)
- Einat Kalisch-Rotem (Living in Haifa), city council member, urban planner, teacher and 2013 mayoral candidate
- Mendi Salzmann (Haifa Awakens)
- Israel Savyon (Lovers of Haifa)
- Yona Yahav (Yona Yahav and Haifa's Youth), incumbent mayor since 2003

== Campaign ==
Kalisch-Rotem's candidacy was endorsed by the Meretz party. While Kalisch-Rotem's candidacy was endorsed by the national Israeli Labor Party leader Avi Gabbay, she did not receive the backing of the local Labor Party. The local Labor Party was headed by mayoral opponent Israel Savyon. Nevertheless, her ultimate victory was seen as a boon for the troubled Labor Party, with a Gabbay-backed candidate defeating Yahav, who was seen as close to Moshe Kahlon, a political enemy of Gabbay.

Despite her being nonreligious, Kalisch-Rotem's candidacy also received support from the city's Haredi community, including from the Degel HaTorah party. Haredi support for a female mayoral candidate was considered notable, as Haredi are seen as tending to believe that leadership should be exclusive to men, as well as tending to believe that women should avoid bringing attention to themselves in the manner required of politicians. Haredi residents of the city backed Kalisch-Rotem with the intent of ousting Yahav.

Kalisch-Rotem's candidacy had originally been disqualified by a district court due to the fact that her lawyer and the Labor Party had submitted both her candidacy and the candidacy of Israel Savyon. However, on 22 October, 2018, the Supreme Court of Israel, decided that she would be allowed to run.

Of the hundreds of Israeli communities that held mayoral races held during the 2018 municipal elections, Haifa was one of roughly ten cities to elect a woman as its mayor. This was an increase from the seven communities that had elected female mayors during the 2013 municipal elections.

== Results ==
Kalisch-Rotem's victory was considered an upset.

Candidate	Party	Votes	%
Einat Kalisch-Rotem	Living in Haifa	66,486	56.21
Yona Yahav	Yona Yahav and Haifa's Youth	43,907	37.12
Avihu Han	Haifa Greens	3,787	3.20
Mendi Salzmann	Haifa Awakens	2,585	2.19
Israel Savyon	Lovers of Haifa	1,506	1.27
Total		118,271	100.00
Valid votes		118,271	94.37
Invalid/blank votes		7,062	5.63
Total votes		125,333	100.00
Registered voters/turnout		256,559	48.85
Source: Ministry of the Interior
