= List of first women mayors =

The first woman mayor was Catherine Malotteau, who served as mayor of Namur in the Austrian Netherlands between 1734 and 1749.

According to Anne Hidalgo, Mónica Fein, Célestine Ketcha Courtès and Ada Colau of The World Organization of United Cities and Local Governments (UCLG) in 2017, in an article titled "Women mayors are ready to stand up and be counted,"

Knowledge is power. We can only achieve equality if we know where we are now and can measure our progress. Global indicators of women’s representation in local government will allow good practices to be identified and shared, and support to be targeted in places that are lagging behind.

== See also ==
- List of first women governors and chief ministers
- List of first women mayors in the United States
- List of the first women holders of political offices
- Women in government
