= Catherine Malotteau =

Catherine Malotteau or Maloteau, née Donna (died 3 September 1749), was the mayor of Namur in the Austrian Netherlands between 1734 and 1749.

== Life ==
She was married to the merchant Thomas Malotteau, mayor of Namur.

Following the death of her spouse in 1734, his colleagues requested she take over the mayoral duties. In a report to the Bishop of Namur, the city officials admitted that it was an uncommon step to have a woman function as mayor, but that Madame Malotteau had in fact already performed the mayoral duties during the tenure of her late husband; that she had always performed her duties with approval.

In 1738, the Governor Duke d'Ursel requested that she be replaced by a man. Lambillon, chairperson of the Provincial Council, suggested that if it was necessary to replace her with a male, she should be replaced by her son, who was a minor, so that she could continue to perform the mayoral duties. In the end, she was allowed to remain as mayor.

She served as mayor of Namur for fifteen years. In 1749 the Provincial Council successfully requested that Madame Malotteau be replaced by Pierre Rasquin, with the motivation that it did not benefit the city if the office of mayor was allowed to be inherited within a family.

== See also ==
- Johanne Dorothea Glomstad
