= Kiryat Eliezer, Haifa =

Coordinates: 32.826014°N 34.979804°E

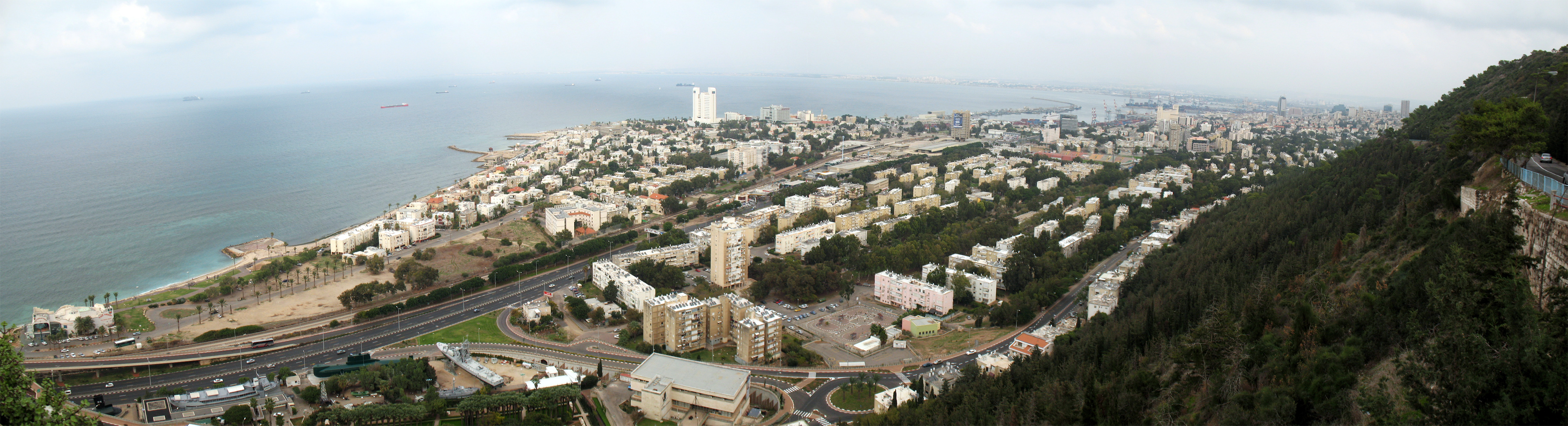
The Kiryat Eliezer (bottom) and Bat Galim (top) neighborhoods

Kiryat Eliezer is a neighborhood in north-western Haifa, Israel, south of Bat Galim.

== History ==
The neighborhood is named after Labor Party politician and the country's first Minister of Finance, Eliezer Kaplan, who died in 1952, just as families began to move in.

Kiryat Eliezer Stadium, former home to Maccabi Haifa F.C., was located there.
