= List of first women mayors in the United States =

After Kansas granted women the right to vote in municipal elections in February 1887, Susanna Madora Salter was elected mayor of Argonia, Kansas on April 4, 1887, and became the first female mayor in the United States. Salter had been nominated without her knowledge or consent, as a stunt intended to discourage women from participation in the political process. In 1862, Nancy Smith won the mayoral election of Oskaloosa, Iowa, after being nominated as a "joke", but she declined to hold office.

Following the adoption of the Nineteenth Amendment to the United States Constitution in 1920, Bertha Knight Landes became the first woman mayor of a city with more than 150,000 residents, after she was elected mayor of Seattle, Washington in 1926.

== Alabama ==
1980

Sue L. Glidewell, first woman elected mayor of Rainbow City, Alabama. Served six consecutive terms for 24 years until retirement in 2004.

1984

Mary Kate Stovall, first female and first African-American mayor of Hurtsboro, Alabama; also first African-American woman mayor in the state of Alabama

1996

Harri Anne Smith, first woman mayor of Slocomb, Alabama

1997

Loretta Spencer, first woman mayor of Huntsville, Alabama

2000

Lucenia Williams Dunn, first woman mayor of Tuskegee, Alabama

2004

Loxcil Tuck, first woman elected mayor of Tarrant, Alabama

2009

Carole Smitherman, first woman mayor of Birmingham, Alabama

2012

Louvenia Diane Lumpkin, first female and first African-American mayor of Orrville, Alabama.

2016

Karin Wilson, first woman mayor of Fairhope, Alabama

2021

Linda Peebles, first woman elected mayor of Courtland, Alabama

== Alaska ==
1946

Doris Barnes, first woman mayor of Wrangell, Alaska

1956

Myrth Sarvela, first woman elected mayor of Sitka, Alaska

1965

Sylvia Ringstad, first woman elected mayor of Fairbanks, Alaska

1966

Bernice Stokke, first woman mayor of Petersburg, Alaska

1975

Virginia Kline, first woman elected mayor of Juneau, Alaska

1976

Elizabeth Hjellen, first woman mayor of Wasilla, Alaska

2011

Charlotte Brower, first woman elected mayor of North Slope Borough, Alaska

2020

Austin Quinn-Davidson, first female mayor of Anchorage, Alaska

== Arizona ==
1927

Fanne Gaar, first woman elected mayor in Arizona, mayor of Casa Grande, Arizona

1973

Ethel Berger, first woman mayor in Sierra Vista, Arizona. Berger was appointed, not elected; at that time mayors were appointed from the city council.

1976

Margaret Hance, first woman elected Mayor of Phoenix, Arizona

1988

Peggy Rubach, first woman elected mayor of Mesa, Arizona

1990

Elizabeth Ames, first woman elected mayor of Douglas, Arizona

1995

Joan Shafer, first woman elected mayor of Surprise, Arizona

2019

Regina Romero, first woman elected mayor of Tucson, Arizona

2023

Nancy Smith, first woman elected mayor of Maricopa, Arizona

== Arkansas ==
1925

Maude Duncan, first woman elected mayor of Winslow, Arkansas

1966

Katherine Green, first woman to serve as mayor of Eureka Springs, Arkansas

1975

Joyce Ferguson, first woman to serve as mayor of West Memphis, Arkansas

1986

Marilyn Johnson, first woman to serve as mayor of Fayetteville, Arkansas

1987

Lottie Shackelford, first woman and first African-American woman appointed mayor of Little Rock, Arkansas (Pulaski County)

== California ==
1915

Estelle Lawton Lindsey, first woman to execute the duties of Mayor of Los Angeles, California

it occurred when Los Angeles Mayor Henry H. Rose was absent from his post in September 1915 and directed Lindsey, a member of the city council, to fill-in as acting mayor.

1916

Ellen French Aldrich, first woman elected mayor of Sawtelle, Los Angeles

1924

Jesse Elwyn Nelson, first woman elected mayor of Signal Hill, California
Edwina Benner, first woman elected mayor of Sunnyvale, California

1926

Mattle Chandler, first woman mayor of Richmond, California

1928

May B. Hopkins, first woman mayor of Redondo Beach, California

1929

Emily Jones, first woman elected mayor of Eureka, California

1931

Julia Platt, first woman elected mayor of Pacific Grove, California

1941

Helen Lawrence, first female mayor of San Leandro, California

1942

Jessie Reed, first female mayor of Seal Beach, California

1947

Carrie L. Hoyt, first female mayor of Berkeley, California

1948

Belle Cooledge, first female mayor of Sacramento, California

1952

Miriam Cummings (mayor), first woman elected mayor of Mill Valley, California

1953

Mabel Richey, first woman mayor of Lodi, California

1963

Teena Clifton, first woman mayor of Rolling Hills, California
Florence E. Douglas, first woman elected mayor of Vallejo, California

1968

Rena Parker, first woman mayor of Corona, California

1971

Lorette Wood, first woman mayor of Santa Cruz, California

1973

Doris A. Davis, first woman and first African American woman elected mayor in the City of Compton.

1974

Janet Gray Hayes, first woman elected Mayor of San Jose, California

1976

Floretta K. Lauber, first woman mayor of Arcadia, California.
Phyllis Sweeney, first woman elected mayor of Laguna Beach, California

1977

Eleanor Crouch, first woman elected mayor of Santa Paula, California

1978

Frances Prince, first woman to become mayor of Thousand Oaks, California

also served 1983 to 1984

Dianne Feinstein, first woman mayor of San Francisco
Mary Patricia Ostrye, first woman mayor and first elected mayor of Monrovia, California

1979

Clo Hoover, first woman elected mayor of Santa Monica, California

1980

Eunice Sato, first woman elected mayor of Long Beach, California
Josephine Heckman, first woman elected mayor of Pasadena, California

1981

Mary K. Shell, first woman elected mayor of Bakersfield, California

1982

Loretta Thompson-Glickman, first African-American woman mayor of Pasadena, California

also first African-American woman mayor of a city over 100,000 people

1982

Mary Lou Howard, first woman mayor of Burbank, California.

1983

Anne B. Diament, elected first woman mayor of Alameda, California

Jana Wilson, first woman mayor of Oroville, California

1986

Maureen O'Connor, first woman elected mayor of San Diego, California

1989

Evelyn Wells, first woman to become Mayor of Lynwood, California.

1990

Teresa R. Frizzel, first woman elected mayor of Riverside, California
Alice Jempsa, first woman elected mayor of Los Alamitos, California

1997

Jessica Maes, first woman elected mayor of Huntington Park, California

2009

Susan Gorin, first woman elected mayor of Santa Rosa, California

2010

Acquanetta Warren, first female mayor of Fontana, California

2011

Laura Roughton, first woman elected mayor of Jurupa Valley, California

also first mayor of Jurupa Valley, California

Jean Quan, first woman elected mayor of Oakland, California

also the first Asian-American mayor of Oakland

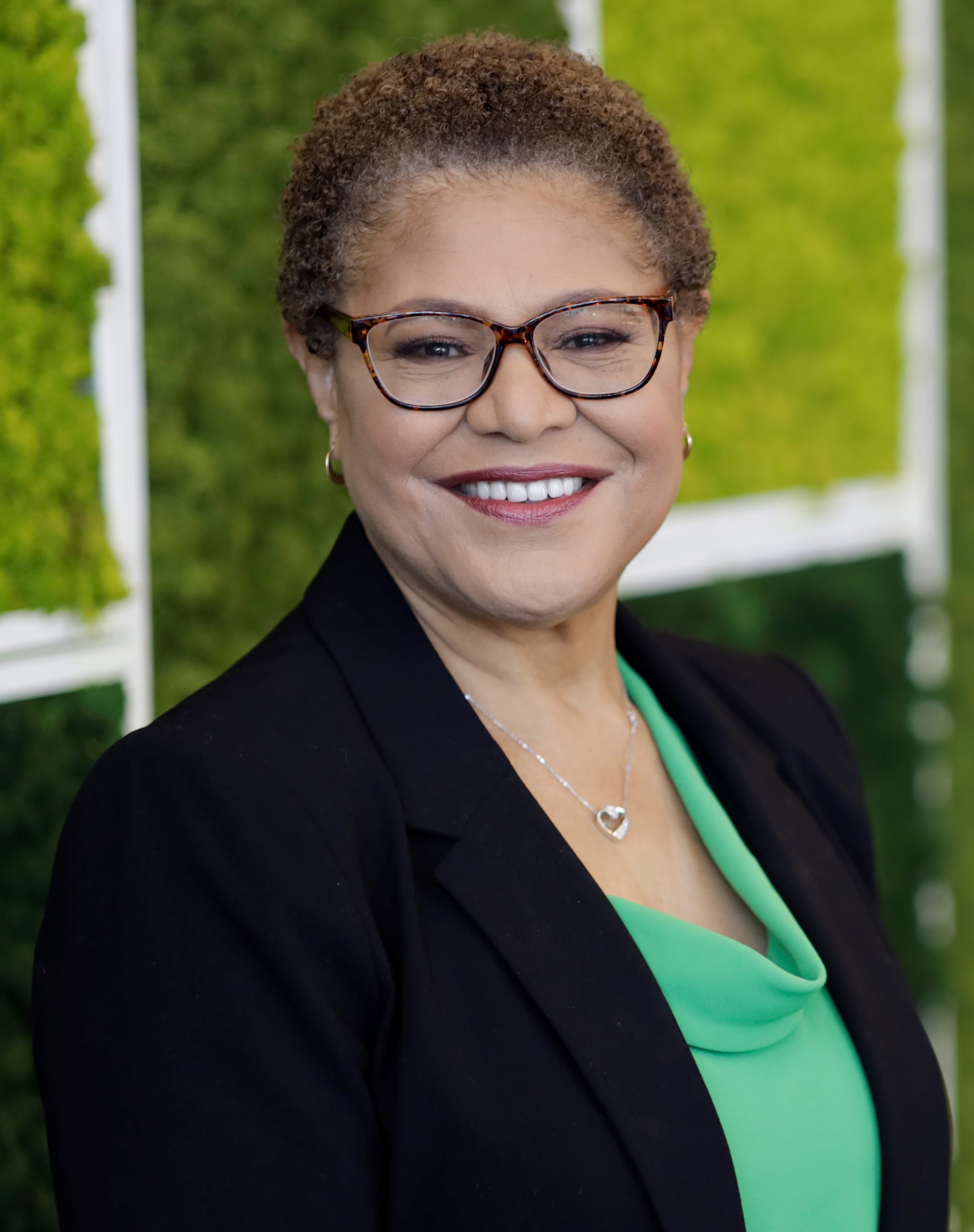
Karen Bass is the first woman elected mayor of Los Angeles.

2012

Frances Ann Romero, first woman elected mayor of Guadalupe, California

2016

Lily Mei, first woman elected mayor of Fremont, California
Michelle Roman, first woman elected Mayor of Kingsburg, California

2017

Mary Ann Carbone first woman of Native American Chumash descent to be appointed by peers as Mayor of Sand City, California

Tasha Cerda first woman and person of either African American and Native American descent to be elected Mayor of Gardena, California

also first person of Native American descent to be elected mayor in the state of California

2018

Alison Kerr, first woman elected Mayor of Del Rey Oaks, California

2020

Christy Holstege first woman elected Mayor of Palm Springs, California

2022

Karen Bass, first woman elected mayor of Los Angeles

Ashleigh Aitken first woman elected mayor of Anaheim
Valerie Amezcua first woman elected mayor of Santa Ana, California

== Colorado ==
1916

C. I. Driver, first woman to serve as mayor of Lone Rock, Colorado

was appointed by the city council

1929

Elizabeth Lower, first woman to be elected mayor of Grover, Colorado

1965

Norma O. Walker, first woman mayor of Aurora, Colorado

1969

Eve Homeyer, first woman elected mayor of Aspen, Colorado

1995

Mary Lou Makepeace, first woman mayor of Colorado Springs, Colorado

== Connecticut ==
1967

Ann Uccello, also known as Antonina Uccello, first woman mayor of Hartford, Connecticut

1987

Carrie Saxon Perry, first African-American woman elected mayor of Hartford, Connecticut

1989

Mary C. Moran, first female mayor of Bridgeport, Connecticut

1993

Linda Blogoslawski, first woman elected mayor of New Britain, Connecticut

2007

April Capone Almon, first woman elected mayor of East Haven, Connecticut

2013

Deb Hinchey, first woman elected mayor of Norwich, Connecticut
Toni Harp, first woman elected mayor, and first female African-American mayor of New Haven, Connecticut
Anita Dugatto, first woman elected mayor of Derby, Connecticut

2017

Nancy Rossi, first woman elected mayor of West Haven, Connecticut

2021

Carolin Simmons, first woman elected mayor of Stamford, Connecticut.

== Delaware ==
1947

Margaret Hastings, first woman mayor of Blades, Delaware

1966

Norma Handloff, first woman mayor of Newark, Delaware and of a Delaware city

2023

Valarie Leary, first woman mayor of New Castle, Delaware

== Florida ==
1917

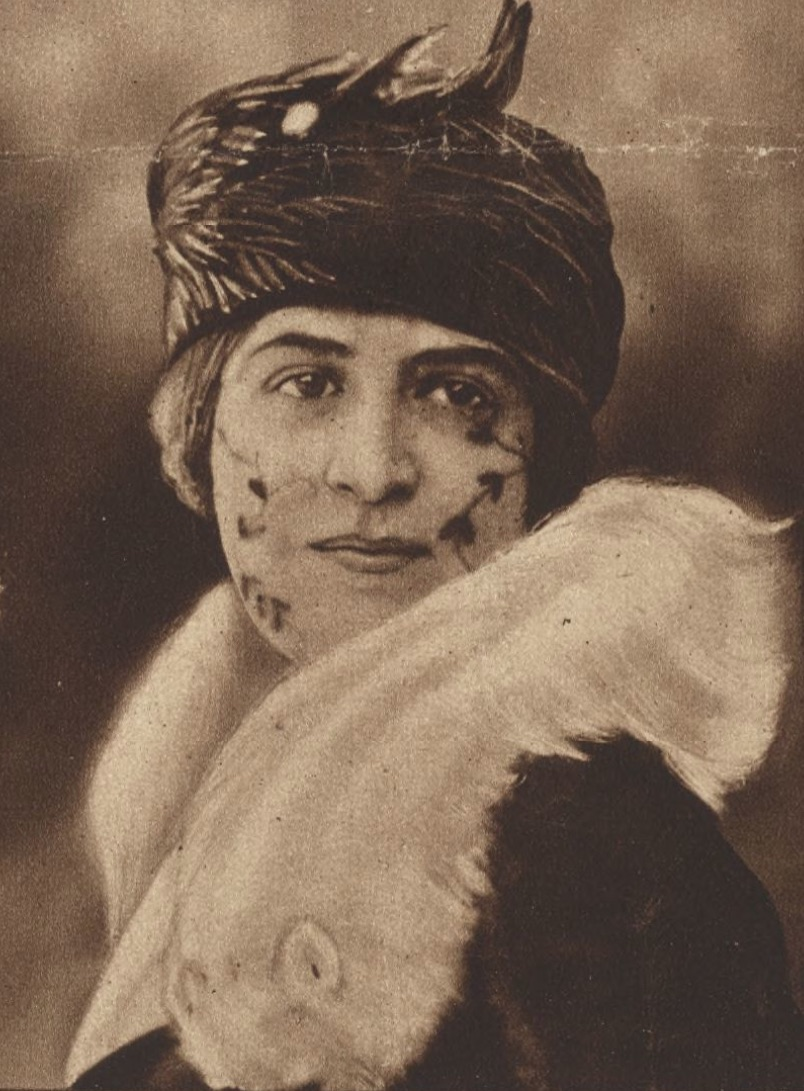
Marian Newhall Horwitz was the first woman mayor in Florida, and anywhere in the South

Marian Newhall Horwitz, first woman who served as mayor of Moore Haven, Florida

also first woman mayor in Florida

1921

Ellen M. Anderson, first woman mayor of Lantana, Florida

1922

Dr. Josie Rogers, first woman mayor of Daytona, Florida

1928

Lena Culver Hawkins, first woman mayor of Brooksville, Florida

1951

Marie Cross, first woman mayor of Jupiter, Florida

1961

Violet Kusbel Cimbora, first woman elected mayor in Florida. Mayor of Masaryktown, Florida

1973

Virginia S. Young, first woman elected mayor of Fort Lauderdale, Florida

1976

Dorothy Wilken, first woman elected mayor of Boca Raton, Florida

1977

Corrine Freeman, first woman mayor of St. Petersburg, Florida

1978

Helen Wilkes, first woman to become mayor of West Palm Beach, Florida

1982

Helen L. Miller, first female African-American mayor in the state of Florida and first female mayor of Opa-locka, Florida

1983

Kathleen Kelly (politician), first woman mayor of Clearwater, Florida
Carol Zimmer Bellamy, first woman mayor of Tallahassee, Florida

1985

Sadye Gibbs Martin, first African American to be elected mayor of Plant City, Florida, which also made her the first female African-American elected mayor of a major city in Florida. She served on the City Commission for 15 years

1987

Sandra Warshaw Freedman, first woman elected mayor of Tampa, Florida

1992

Glenda Hood, first woman elected mayor of Orlando, Florida

1994

Edna Griffith, first woman mayor of Orange Park, Florida. Also, first woman elected and reelected to the Town Council

2006

Patricia Christensen, first woman elected mayor of Port St. Lucie, Florida

2007

Rita Ellis, first woman elected mayor of Delray Beach, Florida

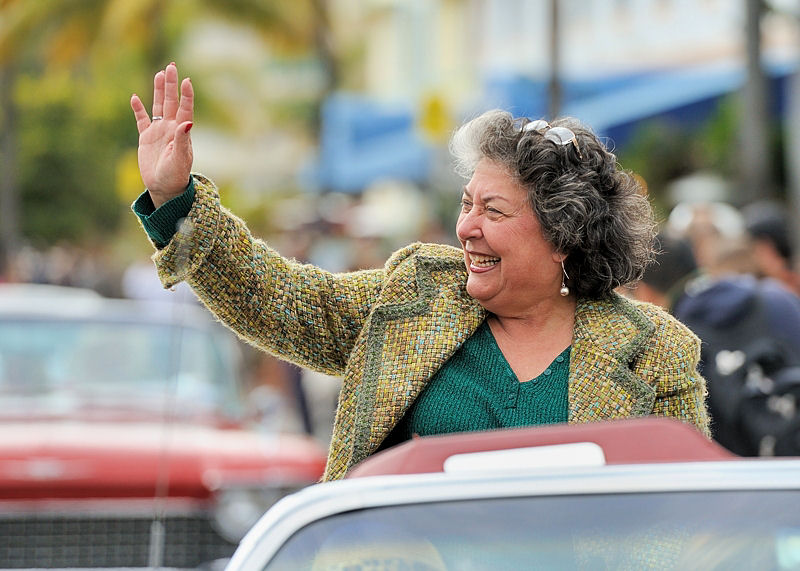
Matti Herrera Bower is the first woman to serve as Mayor of Miami Beach, Florida.

Matti Herrera Bower, first woman elected mayor of Miami Beach, Florida

2013

Marni Sawicki, first woman mayor of Cape Coral, Florida.

2014

Mayra Peña Lindsay, first woman mayor of Key Biscayne, Florida

2015

Gail Ash, first woman elected mayor of Clermont, Florida

2016

Milissa Holland, first woman elected mayor of Palm Coast, Florida

2017

Daisy Raisler, first woman elected mayor of Hispanic descent of Lake Helen, Florida

2018

Heather Lindsay, first woman elected mayor of Milton, Florida

2023

Donna Deegan, First woman elected mayor of Jacksonville, Florida

== Georgia ==
1921

Alice Harrell Strickland, first woman elected mayor in the U.S. state of Georgia, in Duluth, Georgia

1934

Mrs. Adele (wife of Solomon S.) Youmans, first woman mayor of Oak Park, Georgia

1978

Carrie Kent, first African-American woman mayor of Walthourville, Georgia

1991

Susan Weiner, first woman elected Mayor of Savannah, Georgia

1993

Patsy Jo Hilliard, first African American and first woman mayor of East Point, Georgia

2001

Shirley Franklin, first woman and black woman elected mayor of Atlanta, Georgia

2010

Teresa Tomlinson, first woman elected mayor of Columbus, Georgia

2012

Dorothy Hubbard, first woman elected mayor of Albany, Georgia

2017

Mary Parham-Copelan was the first African-American woman to be elected to the office of Mayor of Milledgeville, Georgia. This race was historic because there has never been an elected female to the office of Mayor throughout the city's 205-year history.

2023

Dr. Donya Sartor, Jonesboro, Georgia's first female mayor and first Black mayor.

== Hawaii ==
1962

Helene Hale, first woman elected Chairman and Executive Officer, equivalent to mayor of Hawaii County, Hawaii.

1981

Eileen Anderson, first woman elected mayor of Honolulu, Hawaii

1991

Linda Lingle, first woman elected mayor of Maui, Hawaii

== Idaho ==
1898

Jesse Parker, first woman mayor of Kendrick, Idaho

also the first woman mayor in the state of Idaho.

2003

Carolyn Terteling-Payne, first woman Mayor of Boise, Idaho,

== Illinois ==
1911

Kate F. O'Connor, first woman mayor of Arcadia, Illinois

1915

Angela Rose Canfield, first woman mayor of Warren, Illinois

1923

Nora Gammon, first woman mayor of Thebes, Illinois

1949

Rose M. Brown, first woman mayor of Tinley Park, Illinois

1965

Frances M. Kuhn, first woman mayor of Woodstock, Illinois and first woman mayor of a town of more than 5,000 in Illinois

1969

Marget D. Hamilton, first woman mayor of Wheaton, Illinois

1974

Arlene B Fetzner, first woman mayor of Crystal Lake, Illinois

1979

Jane M. Byrne, first woman elected Mayor of Chicago

Byrne was also the first female mayor of any United States city with more than 3 million residents.

1983

Helen Westberg, first woman mayor of Carbondale, Illinois

1983

Margaret Price, first woman mayor of Naperville, Illinois

1985

Joan Barr, first woman mayor of Evanston, Illinois

1995

Karen Hasara, first woman mayor of Springfield, Illinois

1999

Debra Powell, first woman mayor of East St. Louis, Illinois

2001

Bette Thomas, first black female Mayor of North Chicago, Illinois

2011

Laurie Barra, first woman mayor of Pekin, Illinois

2011

Nancy Rotering, first woman mayor of Pekin, Illinois

2017

Patty Eidam, first woman mayor of Lansing, Illinois

2017

Allison Madison, first African-American and first female mayor of Mound City, Illinois.

2021

Kelly M. Burke, first woman mayor of Highland Park, Illinois

2021

Tiffany Henyard, first woman mayor of Dolton, Illinois

2021

Patty Gregory, first woman mayor of Belleville, Illinois

2021

Ann B. Taylor, first woman mayor of Waukegan, Illinois

2021

Rita Ali, first woman mayor of Peoria, Illinois

== Indiana ==
1938

Nellie Babcock, first woman mayor of Rochester, Indiana

1957

Mary Jancosek Bercik, first woman mayor of Whiting, Indiana

1964

Margaret H. Prickett, first woman elected mayor of Mishawaka, Indiana

1980

Patricia Logan, first woman elected mayor of Noblesville, Indiana
Jane Reiman, first female mayor of Carmel, Indiana

1985

Cosette Simon, first female mayor of Fort Wayne, Indiana

1999

Shirley Robb, first woman elected mayor of Princeton, Indiana

2000

Kathleen Chroback, first woman elected mayor of La Porte, Indiana

2006

Olga Velazquez, first woman elected mayor of Portage, Indiana

2007

Barbara Ewing, first female Democrat elected mayor of Tell City, Indiana

2007

Shawna M. Girgis, first woman elected mayor of Bedford, Indiana

2011

Karen Freeman-Wilson, first woman elected mayor of Gary, Indiana and first African-American woman elected mayor in the State of Indiana

2024

Stephanie Terry, first African-American and first woman elected mayor of Evansville, Indiana

== Iowa ==
1862

Nancy Smith, first woman elected mayor in the United States in Oskaloosa, Iowa in 1862.

Smith declined to serve as mayor.

1923

Emma J. Harvat, first woman elected mayor of Iowa City, Iowa

first woman in the United States to be elected mayor of a city with more than 10,000 inhabitants

1951

Emily L. Perry, first woman mayor of Floyd, Iowa

1971

Kathryn Kirschbaum, first woman elected mayor of Davenport, Iowa

1973

Julianne M. Jensen was elected the first woman mayor of Knoxville, Iowa

2013

Diana Willits, first woman elected mayor of Windsor Heights, Iowa

2023

Connie Boesen, first female mayor of Des Moines, Iowa

== Kansas ==
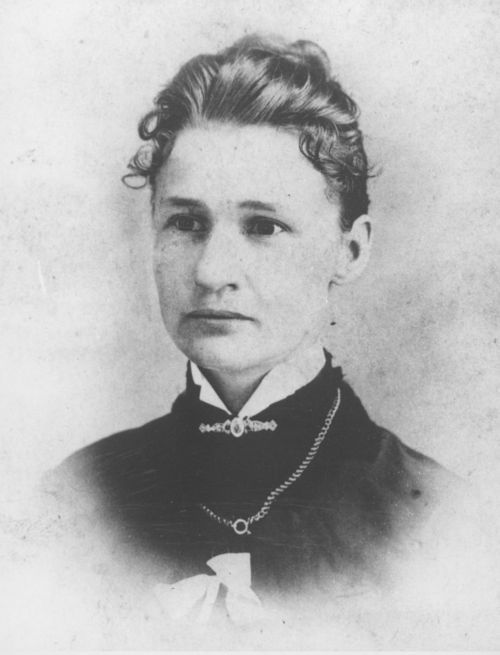
Susanna M. Salter was the first woman to serve as mayor in the United States.

=== 1800s ===
1887

Susanna M. Salter, first woman elected mayor of Argonia, Kansas

the first woman to serve as mayor of an American city.

1888

Mary D. Lowman, first woman elected mayor of Oskaloosa, Kansas

also the second woman mayor in Kansas. She served alongside the first all-woman city council in the United States. They were all re-elected in 1889.

1889

America L. King, first woman mayor of Elk Falls, Kansas
Ella Miller, first woman mayor of Rossville, Kansas
Wilhelmina Morgan, first woman mayor of Cottonwood Falls, Kansas
Lucy Sullivan, first woman mayor of Baldwin, Kansas

1890

Belle Gray, first woman mayor of Canton, Kansas
Margaret Kelly, first woman mayor of Edgerton, Kansas

1891

Rachel S. Packson, first woman mayor of Kiowa, Kansas
Elizabeth Vedder, first woman mayor of Haddam, Kansas

1893

Mary Barnes, elected the first woman mayor of Geuda Springs, Kansas in 1893.
Mrs. John Smith, first woman mayor of Wamego, Kansas

1894

Anna Austin, first woman mayor of Pleasanton, Kansas [population approx., 1,500]

1895

Antoinette L. Haskell, first woman mayor of Gaylord, Kansas

1896

C. A. Curtis, first woman mayor of Cimarron, Kansas
M. A. Wade, the first woman mayor of Ellis, Kansas

Wade served with an all-woman municipal government.

1897

Anna Strain, first woman mayor of Jamestown, Kansas

1899

Elizabeth Totten, first woman mayor of Beattie, Kansas

=== 1900s ===
1911

Ella Wilson, first woman mayor of Hunnewell, Kansas

1913

Mrs. H. C. Defenbaugh, first woman elected mayor in Tyro, Kansas

1917

Avis Francis, first woman mayor of Valley Center, Kansas

1920

Louise Fussman, mayor Humboldt, Kansas

1933

Clara Marie Emma Heiser, first woman elected mayor of Ellsworth, Kansas

1945

Daisy Dean Spencer, first woman elected mayor of Newton, Kansas

1975

Connie Ames Peters, first woman elected mayor of Wichita, Kansas

1997

Joan Wagnon, first woman elected of mayor of Topeka, Kansas

2020

Sarah J Boeh-Cerra, first woman mayor of Troy, Kansas

== Kentucky ==
1951

Rebekah H. Hord, first woman mayor in Maysville

also first woman mayor in Kentucky

1993

Pam Miller, first woman mayor of Lexington, Kentucky

== Louisiana ==
1920

Lula V. Coleman, Deputy Sheriff of LaSalle Parish, is appointed Mayor of Jena, Louisiana by Governor John M. Parker as the first woman mayor in Louisiana

1925

Maggie Skipwith Smith, first woman elected mayor in Louisiana and of Wilson, Louisiana

1956

Mary Estus Jones Webb, first woman to serve as Mayor-President of Baton Rouge, Louisiana

1990

Hazel Beard, first woman elected mayor of Shreveport, Louisiana

1993

Willie Mount, first woman elected mayor of Lake Charles, Louisiana

1998

Rosa Mae Scott Jones, first female and first African-American mayor of Lecompte, Louisiana.

2017

Sharon Weston Broome first woman elected as Mayor-President of Baton Rouge, Louisiana

2018

Latoya Cantrell, first woman elected mayor of New Orleans, Louisiana

== Maine ==
1928

Ella L. Maddocks, first woman mayor equivalent of Owls Head, Maine

1946

Helen C. Frost, first woman mayor of Portland, Maine

1976

Lillian Caron, first woman mayor of Lewiston, Maine.
Elizabeth Hamilton, first woman mayor of Caribou, Maine

1978

Ruth S. Foster, first woman mayor of Ellsworth, Maine

1982

Nancy Hill, first woman mayor of Waterville, Maine

2024

Jodi MacPhail, first woman mayor of Saco, Maine

== Maryland ==
1974

Jayne Harper Plank, first woman elected mayor of Kensington, Maryland

1986

Dani Duniho, first woman elected mayor of Laurel, Maryland

1987

Anna Owens, first woman elected mayor of College Park, Maryland

2001

Ellen O. Moyer, first woman elected mayor of Annapolis, Maryland

2007

Sheila Dixon, first woman and first African-American woman elected mayor of Baltimore, Maryland

2008

Victoria Jackson-Stanley, first woman and first African-American woman to be elected mayor of Cambridge, Maryland

2020

Emily Keller, first woman elected mayor of Hagerstown, Maryland

2021

Mona Becker, first woman elected mayor of Westminster, Maryland
Stacy Link, first woman elected mayor of Sykesville, Maryland

== Massachusetts ==
1939

Alice Burke, first woman elected as mayor in New England—in Westfield, Massachusetts

1955

Beatrice Corliss, first woman elected mayor of Gloucester, Massachusetts (weak-mayor government, elected by city council).

1964

Ellen A. Sampson, first woman elected mayor of Lowell, Massachusetts (weak-mayor government, elected by city council).

1972

Barbara Ackermann, first woman elected mayor of Cambridge, Massachusetts (weak-mayor government, elected by city council).

1982

Sara Robertson, first woman elected mayor of Worcester, Massachusetts (weak-mayor government, elected by city council)
Cynthia G. Kruger, first woman to serve as mayor of New Bedford, Massachusetts (as council president, Kruger became the acting Mayor when the office became vacant).

1983

Brenda Reed, first woman elected mayor of Attleboro, Massachusetts.

1986

Marilyn Porreca, first woman elected mayor of Medford, Massachusetts (weak-mayor government, elected by city council)

1987

Anne Wojtkowski, first woman elected mayor of Pittsfield, Massachusetts.

1989

Mary Hurley, first woman elected mayor of Springfield, Massachusetts.

1991

Mary Ford, first woman elected mayor of Northampton, Massachusetts.

1992

Rosemary S. Tierney, first woman elected mayor of New Bedford, Massachusetts.

1993

Mary Claire Kennedy, first woman mayor of Lawrence, Massachusetts.
Lisa L. Mead, first woman elected mayor of Newburyport, Massachusetts.

1997

Mary H. Whitney, first woman elected mayor of Fitchburg, Massachusetts.

1999

Dorothy Kelly Gay, first woman mayor of Somerville, Massachusetts.
Sharon Pollard, first woman elected mayor of Methuen, Massachusetts.

2002

Christine Forgey, first woman elected mayor of Greenfield, Massachusetts.

2003

Jeannette A. McCarthy, first woman elected mayor of Waltham, Massachusetts.

2005

Kim Driscoll, first woman elected mayor of Salem, Massachusetts
Nancy E. Stevens, first woman elected mayor of Marlborough, Massachusetts.

2007

Susan M. Kay, first woman elected mayor of Weymouth, Massachusetts
Konstantina Lukes, first popularly-elected woman mayor of Worcester, Massachusetts (weak-mayor government)
Carolyn Kirk, first popularly-elected woman mayor of Gloucester, Massachusetts.

2009

Linda Balzotti, first woman elected mayor of Brockton, Massachusetts.
Judith Flanagan Kennedy, first woman elected mayor of Lynn, Massachusetts.
Elaine A. Pluta, first woman elected mayor of Holyoke, Massachusetts.

2014

Karen L. Cadieux, first woman elected mayor of Easthampton, Massachusetts

2016

Stephanie Muccini Burke, first popularly-elected woman mayor of Medford, Massachusetts

2017

Ruthanne Fuller, first woman elected mayor of Newton, Massachusetts
Yvonne Spicer, first woman elected mayor of Framingham, Massachusetts. Also the first mayor of Framingham and the first African-American woman mayor in Massachusetts.

2018

Gail Infurna, first woman to serve as mayor of Melrose, Massachusetts (elected by city council to finish term of Robert J. Dolan).

2019

Kassandra Gove, first woman elected mayor of Amesbury, Massachusetts.
Shaunna O'Connell, first woman elected mayor of Taunton, Massachusetts.

2021

Kim Janey, first woman to serve as acting mayor of Boston (upon the resignation of Marty Walsh to take the position of United States Secretary of Labor in the Cabinet of Joe Biden).

Michelle Wu, first woman elected mayor of Boston.

2022

Jennifer Macksey, the first woman elected mayor in North Adams, Massachusetts.

2023

Melinda Barrett, the first woman elected mayor in Haverhill, Massachusetts.
Erin Joyce, the first woman elected mayor in Braintree, Massachusetts.

== Michigan ==
1948

Mildred B. Stark, first woman mayor of East Detroit, Michigan from 1948-53, and the first female mayor in Michigan.

1973

Betty Lee Ongley, first woman mayor of Portage, Michigan
Bette Davis, first woman mayor of South Haven, Michigan
Elizabeth Brater, first woman mayor of Ann Arbor, Michigan

1975

Margaret M. Doud, first woman mayor of the City of Mackinac Island, Michigan (and re-elected every year since then)

2001

Brenda L. Lawrence, first woman and first African American to be elected mayor of Southfield, Michigan

2005

Carol B. Cottrell, first woman elected mayor of Saginaw, Michigan

2015

Karen Weaver, first woman and first African-American woman mayor of Flint, Michigan
Rosalynn Bliss, first woman mayor of Grand Rapids, Michigan

2018

Lindsey McGuire, first woman mayor and President of DeTour Village, Michigan

2023

Lori M. Stone, first woman mayor of Warren, Michigan

== Minnesota ==
1921

Lillian Cox Gault, first woman elected mayor of St. Peter, Minnesota and in any city of Minnesota

1921

Florence J. Pierce, the first woman elected mayor of Goodhue, Minnesota
Ida Sparks Clarke, the first woman appointed mayor of Cokato, Minnesota. She was reelected in 1922.

1922

Isabelle Flood, the first woman appointed mayor of Swanville, Minnesota. She was reelected in 1923 and 1924, completing three terms as mayor.

1925

Elizabeth Ries, first woman elected mayor of Shakopee, Minnesota

1935

Louise Bucks, first woman elected mayor of Waconia, Minnesota

1949

Bertha Trim, first woman elected mayor of Plainview, Minnesota

1953

Agnes Israelson, first woman elected mayor in Thief River Falls, Minnesota

1973

Mary P. Anderson, first woman elected mayor in Kinney, Minnesota, from 1973-2002

1973

Ione Ellingson, first woman elected mayor in Menahga, Minnesota

1992

Jane Robbins, first woman elected mayor of Pine City, Minnesota

1993

Sharon Sayles Belton, first woman and first African-American elected mayor of Minneapolis, Minnesota

2008

Mary Rossing, first woman elected mayor of Northfield, Minnesota

2013

Del Rae Williams, first woman elected mayor of Moorhead, Minnesota

2016

Emily Larson, first woman elected mayor of Duluth, Minnesota

2018

Najwa Massad, first woman elected mayor of Mankato, Minnesota
Kim Norton, first woman elected mayor of Rochester, Minnesota

2026

Kaohly Her, first woman and first Asian-American elected mayor of St. Paul, Minnesota.

== Mississippi ==
1950

Dorothy Painter Crawford, first woman elected mayor in Mississippi, Madison, Mississippi

1977

Unita Blackwell, first African American woman elected mayor in Mississippi, Mayersville, Mississippi

1987

Helen Perkins, first woman, and first African American elected mayor of Hollandale, Mississippi

2001

Yvonne Brown, first black woman elected mayor of Tchula, Mississippi; first black Republican woman elected mayor in the state of Mississippi

2004

Heather McTeer Toney, first woman and first African-American woman to serve as mayor of Greenville, Mississippi

2005

Sheriel F. Perkins, first woman and African American elected mayor of Greenwood, Mississippi

2009

Cheri Barry, first woman elected mayor of Meridian, Mississippi

2017

Lynn Spruill, first woman elected mayor of Starkville, Mississippi.

== Missouri ==
1921

Mayme Ousley, first woman elected mayor of St. James, Missouri

Ousley was also the first woman elected mayor in the state of Missouri

1924

Mildred Putnam, first woman elected mayor of Stoutsville, Missouri

1930

Essie Ward, first woman elected mayor of King City, Missouri

1936

Edith Pearce, first woman elected mayor of Greentop, Missouri

1977

Lillian Herman, first woman mayor of Hannibal, Missouri

1982

Barbara Potts, first woman elected mayor of Independence, Missouri

1999

Kay Barnes, first woman elected Mayor of Kansas City, Missouri

2017

Lyda Krewson first woman elected mayor of Saint Louis, Missouri

== Montana ==
1932

June G. Olsen, first woman elected mayor of Ekalaka, Montana

1936

Ella M. Amdahl, first woman elected mayor of Hingham, Montana
Evalina Herd, first woman elected mayor of Kevin, Montana

1947

Juliet Gregory, first woman mayor of Missoula, Montana

1963

Marian Erdmann, first woman elected mayor of Great Falls, Montana

== Nebraska ==
1921

Mary Peterson, first woman elected mayor of Red Cloud, Nebraska
Ella Jacobson, first woman elected mayor of Waterloo, Nebraska

1975

Helen Boosalis, first woman elected mayor of Lincoln, Nebraska

2006

Margaret Hornady, first woman elected mayor of Grand Island, Nebraska

2013

Jean Stothert, first woman elected mayor of Omaha, Nebraska

== Nevada ==
1954

Dorothy Porter, first woman elected mayor of North Las Vegas, Nevada

1979

Barbara Bennett, first woman elected mayor of Reno, Nevada

1985

Lorna Kesterson, first woman elected mayor of Henderson, Nevada

1999

Jan Laverty Jones, first woman elected Mayor of Las Vegas, Nevada

== New Hampshire ==
1944

Mary Dondero, first woman mayor of Portsmouth, New Hampshire

2007

Donnalee Lozeau, first woman elected mayor of Nashua, New Hampshire

2015

Caroline McCarley, first woman elected mayor of Rochester, New Hampshire

2017

Joyce Craig first woman elected mayor of Manchester, New Hampshire

== New Jersey ==
1925

Rebecca Estell Bourgeois Winston, first woman elected mayor in New Jersey; first mayor and founder of Estell Manor

1931

Clara E. Grauert, the 72-year-old widow of Emile W. Grauert replaced her husband, who died in office as the mayor of Weehawken, New Jersey

1933

Doris W. Bradway, first woman mayor of Wildwood, New Jersey

1943

Edith May Greenan, first woman mayor of Avalon, New Jersey

1950

Katharine Elkus White, first woman mayor of Red Bank, New Jersey

1951

Vera Martucci, first woman appointed mayor of Teterboro, New Jersey

1967

Mary "Peggy" Kerr, first woman mayor of Sayreville, New Jersey, elected with three female councilwomen, creating the first female-majority municipal government in New Jersey
Patricia Q. Sheehan, first woman mayor of New Brunswick, New Jersey

1972

Doris Mahalick, first woman elected mayor of Wallington and first in Bergen County

1973

Eileen Lloyd, first woman elected mayor of Keansburg, New Jersey

1974

Eleanor Kieliszek, first woman elected Mayor of Teaneck, New Jersey

1977

Maria Barnaby Greenwald, first woman elected mayor of Cherry Hill, New Jersey

1978

Joanne L. Howell, first female mayor of Bernards Township, New Jersey. Started the town recycling program.

1980

Elizabeth G. Baumgartner, first women mayor of Madison, New Jersey

1988

Janet Whitman, first female mayor of Summit, New Jersey

2000

Gwendolyn Faison (1925 – 2021), first female mayor of Camden (2000 - 2010)

2002

Nancy Merse, first woman mayor of Edgewater, New Jersey

2008

Wilda Diaz, first woman elected Mayor of Perth Amboy, New Jersey

2009

Dawn Zimmer, first woman elected mayor of Hoboken, New Jersey

2013

Stacey Jordan, first woman elected mayor of Moorestown, New Jersey

2014

Tana Raymond, first woman elected mayor of Garfield, New Jersey

2015

Christine Dansereau, first woman elected mayor of Roselle, New Jersey
Deirdre A. Dillon, first woman mayor of Ramsey, New Jersey

2020

Dina Grilo, first woman elected Mayor of East Newark, New Jersey
LaDaena Thomas, first woman elected mayor of Penns Grove, and the first African-American woman to be elected in Salem County, New Jersey

== New Mexico ==
1936

Mrs. W. P. Crater, first woman mayor of Des Moines, New Mexico

1982

Consuelo Salazar-Thompson, first woman mayor of Espanola, New Mexico

1994

Debbie Jaramillo, first woman mayor of Santa Fe, New Mexico

== New York ==
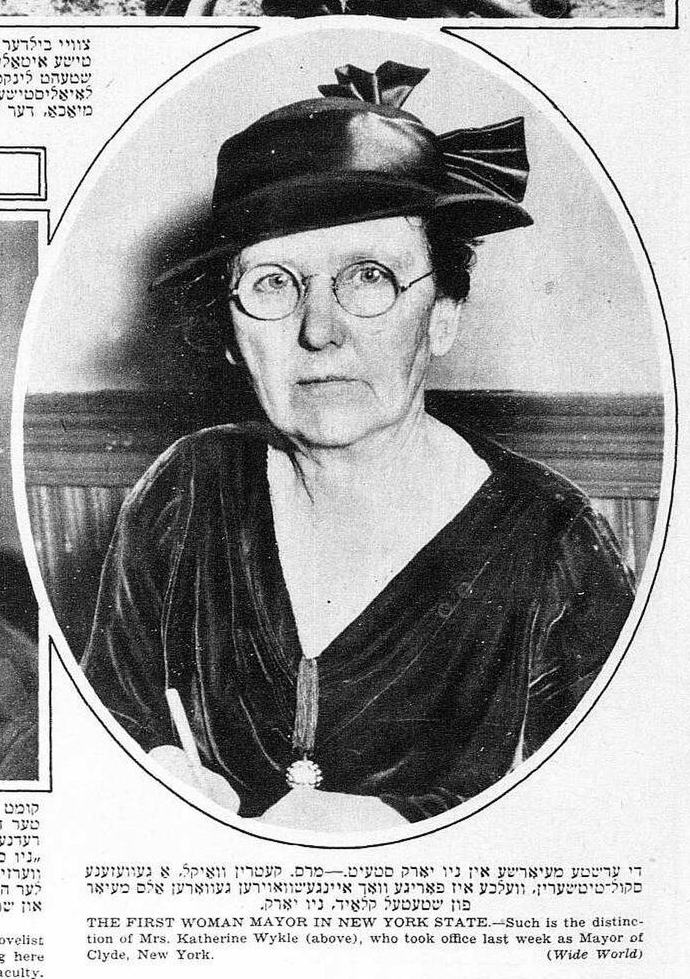
Katherine Wykle as she appeared in The Jewish Daily Forward, April 11, 1937

1919

Justine de Peyster Martin was drafted to run (unopposed) and was elected mayor of the village of Tivoli, New York.

1929

Bessie Moore, first woman elected mayor of Candor (village), New York

Moore won by write-in vote and refused to take the oath of office

1937

Katherine Wykle, mayor of Clyde, New York,

also the first woman mayor in New York

1945

Walker, first woman mayor of Lisle (village), New York

1949

Edith P. Welty, first woman mayor of Yonkers, New York

1955

Ragina Balas, first woman elected mayor of Ferry Village, New York

1957

Lolita Cass, first mayor of Watkins Glen, New York
Elizabeth Hall, first woman mayor of Sag Harbor, New York
Betty Potter, first woman mayor of Mount Kisco, New York

1970

Virginia B. McDonald, first woman elected mayor of Cohoes, New York

1973

Barbara Impellittiere, first woman elected mayor of Cold Spring, New York

1974

Mimi Bryan, first woman elected mayor of Piermont, New York
Anne Kaplan, first woman mayor of Monticello, New York

1975

Ruth Blankman, first woman elected mayor of Canton, New York
Eleanor A. Simpson, first woman elected mayor in Old Westbury, New York

also first woman elected mayor in Nassau County, New York

1977

Suzi Oppenheimer, first woman elected mayor of Mamaroneck (village), New York

1979

Virginia Smith, first woman mayor of Ticonderoga, New York

1981

Juanita Crabb, first woman elected Mayor of Binghamton, New York

1984

Karen Johnson, first woman elected mayor of Schenectady, New York

1987

Laura Slate, first woman elected mayor of Gouverneur, New York

1993

Shirley Seney, first woman mayor of Lake Placid, New York

1994

Frances Gibbs, first woman mayor of Peekskill, New York

1995

Christine Korff, first woman elected mayor of Port Chester, New York

2001

Lauren Fortmiller, first woman elected mayor of Sag Harbor, New York

also the first lesbian mayor of Sag Harbor

Sandra Strader, first woman elected mayor of Tupper Lake, New York

2008

Patricia Sweetland, first woman mayor of Adams, New York

2009

Stephanie Miner, first woman elected mayor of Syracuse, New York

2013

Trish Abato, first woman elected mayor of Suffern, New York
Ashley Hennings, first woman elected mayor of Newport, New York
Kathy Sheehan, first woman elected mayor of Albany, New York
Lovely Warren, first woman elected mayor, and first African-American woman mayor of Rochester, New York

== North Carolina ==
1922

Maude R. Satterthwaite, first woman mayor of Stonewall, North Carolina

1923

Katherine Staton of New London first Female mayor in North Carolina and first female elected to municipal government in NC.

1924

Katherine Mayo Cowan, first woman mayor of Wilmington, North Carolina

1925

Annie Koonce Jenkins, first woman mayor of Maysville, North Carolina

1928

Leah Arcouet Chiles, first woman mayor of Kenilworth until annexation into Asheville, North Carolina

1954

Evelyn Kent, first woman elected Mayor of Granite Falls, North Carolina

1975

Beth Finch, first woman elected mayor of Fayetteville, North Carolina
Ruth West, first woman mayor of Carrboro, North Carolina

1977

Isabella Cannon, first woman elected mayor of Raleigh, North Carolina

1981

Deborah Ponder Baker, first woman mayor of Hot Springs, North Carolina

1985

Ella Bengel, first woman elected mayor of New Bern, North Carolina
Judith Mendenhall, first female mayor of High Point, North Carolina

1987

Sue Myrick, first woman elected Mayor of Charlotte, North Carolina

1989

Martha S. Wood, first woman elected mayor of Winston-Salem, North Carolina

1991

Mary Kanyha, first woman mayor of Pine Knoll Shores, North Carolina

1993

Carolyn Allen first woman elected mayor of Greensboro, North Carolina
Sylvia Kerckhoff, first woman elected Mayor of Durham, North Carolina

1995

Rosemary Waldorf, first woman elected Mayor of Chapel Hill, North Carolina

1997

Leni Sitnick, first woman elected Mayor of Asheville, North Carolina.

1999

Jennifer Stultz, first woman elected mayor of Gastonia, North Carolina

2002

Jeanne Milliken Bonds, first woman elected mayor of Knightdale, North Carolina

2017

Marla Thompson, first woman elected mayor of Long View, North Carolina

2019

Kathy Stanley Galvan, first woman elected mayor of Stoneville, North Carolina

2021

Jennifer Talley, first woman elected mayor of Graham, North Carolina

2025

Beth Kennett, first woman elected mayor of Burlington, North Carolina

== North Dakota ==
1946

Agnes Geelan, first woman elected Mayor of Enderlin, North Dakota

1982

Mona Marchus, first woman elected Mayor of Bottineau, North Dakota

== Ohio ==
1921

Amy A. Kaukonen, first woman elected mayor in Fairport Harbor, Ohio
Dolly Spencer, first woman elected mayor in Milford, Ohio

1923

Mary McFadden, first woman mayor of Magnetic Springs, Ohio who was appointed by the city council at the age of 80.

1954

Dorothy N. Dolbey, first woman elected mayor in Cincinnati, Ohio

1959

Anna Covault, first woman elected mayor in Fletcher, Ohio

1961

Myrtle Reed, first woman mayor of Grand River, Ohio

1966

Lucille Barbato Reed, first woman elected mayor in Cuyahoga County, Ohio. She served as Mayor of Bedford Heights, Ohio for 15 years. Her administration was instrumental in developing the Reed Park Development, which is the site of the outdoor pool and picnic pavilion. The city saw the most rapid expansion under her administration, doubling the population. The present City Hall and the onset of the many programs that transpired from here resulted in a long term for Mayor Reed. Mayor Reed served until 1981 when she decided not to run again.

1969

Viola Phillips, first woman elected mayor in Loveland, Ohio

1969

Sophia Mitchell, first African-American woman to serve as mayor in Ohio. Mitchell was appointed mayor of Rendville, Ohio. She continued to lead for at least two additional terms.

1972

Ellen Walker Craig-Jones of Urbancrest, Ohio became the first African-American woman to be elected mayor, by popular vote, of a United States municipality.

1976

Marguerite Bowman, first woman elected Mayor of Elyria, Ohio

1977

Beryl E. Rothschild, first woman elected Mayor of University Heights, Ohio

1984

Donna Owens, first woman elected Mayor of Toledo, Ohio

1986

Lois Reed, first woman elected mayor of Malinta, Ohio

1996

Madeline Cain, first woman elected mayor of Lakewood, Ohio

2000

Marcia Fudge, first woman elected mayor of Warrensville Heights, Ohio

2001

Rhine McLin, first woman elected mayor of Dayton, Ohio
Jane Leaver, first woman elected mayor of Medina, Ohio

2002

Jane L. Campbell, first woman elected mayor of Cleveland, Ohio

2003

Georgine Welo, first woman elected mayor of South Euclid, Ohio

2013

Miesha Headen, first woman elected mayor of Richmond Heights, Ohio

2015

Paula Hicks-Hudson became the first African-American woman to be elected mayor of Toledo, Ohio.

2016

Annette M. Blackwell, first woman elected mayor of Maple Heights, Ohio

2017

Carrie Schlade first woman elected mayor of Bryan, Ohio

2019

Nicole Condrey first woman elected mayor of Middletown, Ohio

2021

Marie Gallo first woman elected mayor of Parma Heights, Ohio
Kelly Montgomery first woman elected mayor of Georgetown, Ohio |date=2023-11-04|

== Oklahoma ==
1922

Mamie Foster, first woman elected mayor of Wyandotte, Oklahoma 1922-1927

1925

Mildred Harrison, first woman elected mayor of Osage, Oklahoma

1931

Phenie Lou Ownby, first woman elected mayor of Broken Arrow, Oklahoma

1957

June Tompkins Benson, first female mayor of Norman, Oklahoma

1971

Patience Latting, first woman elected mayor of Oklahoma City, Oklahoma

Latting was also the first female mayor of any major U.S. city with more than 350,000 residents.

1973

Lelia Foley was elected the mayor of Taft, Oklahoma. She was the first African American woman to be elected mayor in the United States.

1992

M. Susan Savage, first woman elected mayor of Tulsa, Oklahoma

== Oregon ==
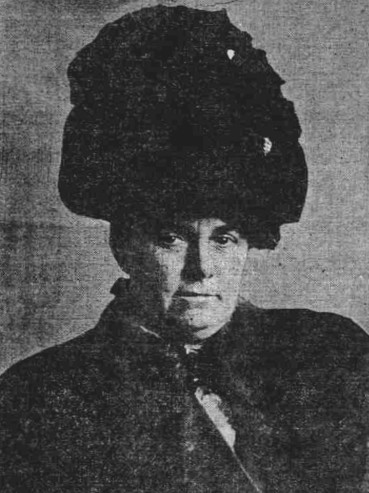
Clara C. Munson was the first woman elected mayor in Oregon in the 20th century.

1895

Alice E. Burns, first woman mayor of Florence, Oregon

Burns was also the first woman elected in the state of Oregon. Women were elected to all other town offices as well.

1912

Clara C. Munson, first woman mayor of Warrenton, Oregon

also the first woman elected mayor following the passage of the equal suffrage law in Oregon. Some sources, including The Daily Astorian, erroneously call Munson the first woman elected mayor in Oregon, however, that distinction belongs to Alice E. Burns who was elected mayor of Florence, Oregon in 1895.

1914

Clara Latourell Larsson, first woman elected mayor of Troutdale, Oregon

1917

Laura Jane Starcher, first woman elected mayor of Umatilla, Oregon

1918

Blanch Shelley, first woman elected mayor of Sandy, Oregon

1920

Grace B. Lampshire, first woman elected mayor of Burns, Oregon
Bernice Pitts, first woman to execute the office of Mayor of Portland, Oregon

Pitts, a student at Richmond School, served as mayor in place of George Luis Baker for five minutes191

1928

Letty Sankey, first woman elected mayor of Sweet Home, Oregon. She served for 1929 & 1930. Her husband W.S. Sankey took a leave of absence from his city council term during her tenure as mayor. "I refuse to take orders from the battle axe on the council, when she always bosses me around at home." Mr. Sankey said.

1932

Edna Allen, first woman mayor of Jefferson, Oregon

1949

Dorothy McCullough Lee, first woman mayor of Portland, Oregon

1955

Mary Van Stevens, first woman elected mayor of Heppner, Oregon

She resigned in 1956 after purchasing a business in The Dalles, Oregon.

1981

Joy Burgess, first woman elected mayor of Milwaukie, Oregon
Ruth Burleigh, first woman elected mayor of Bend, Oregon

1982

Margaret Weil, first female mayor of Gresham, Oregon

1983

Sue Miller, first woman elected mayor of Salem, Oregon

1985

Shirley Huffman, first woman elected mayor of Hillsboro, Oregon

1989

Carol Heinkel, first woman mayor of Coburg, Oregon, elected in 1988.

1993

Ruth Bascom, first woman mayor of Eugene, Oregon

2000

Lore Christopher, first woman elected mayor of Keizer, Oregon

2017

Carol Westfall, first woman elected mayor of Klamath Falls, Oregon

2020

Lacey Beaty, first woman and youngest mayor of Beaverton, Oregon

== Pennsylvania ==
1959

Jennie Black, first woman elected Mayor of Smithfield, Pennsylvania and first woman mayor elected in Pennsylvania.

1977

Betty Marshall, first woman elected Mayor of York, Pennsylvania

1986

Willie Mae Leake, first woman and first African American mayor of Chester, Pennsylvania

1989

Janice Stork, first woman elected Mayor of Lancaster, Pennsylvania
Sophie Masloff, first woman elected mayor of Pittsburgh, Pennsylvania

1993

Anne Jones, first woman elected mayor of Pottstown, Pennsylvania

2009

Donna McFadden-Connors, first woman appointed mayor of Pittston, Pennsylvania
Linda Thompson, first woman and first African-American elected mayor of Harrisburg, Pennsylvania

2022

Rita Frealing, first women elected mayor and first African-American mayor of Gettysburg, Pennsylvania

2023

Cherelle Parker, first woman elected mayor and third African-American mayor of Philadelphia, Pennsylvania

== Rhode Island ==
1992

Kathryn O'Hare, first woman elected mayor of West Warwick, Rhode Island

1995

Susan Menard, first woman elected mayor of Woonsocket, Rhode Island

2008

Jeanne-Marie Napolitano, first woman mayor of Newport, Rhode Island

2020

María Rivera, first woman mayor of Central Falls, Rhode Island

== South Carolina ==
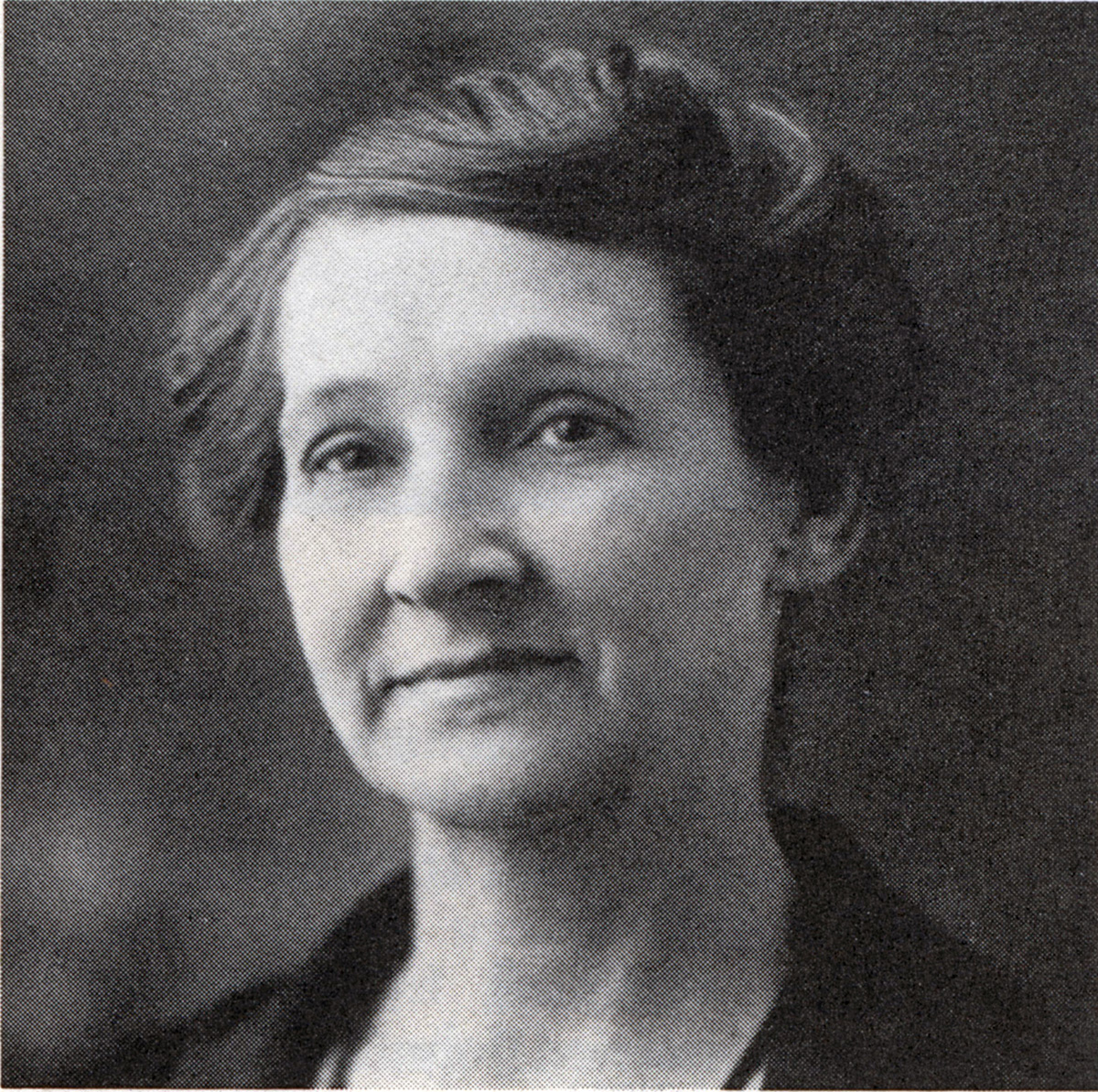
Rosa Belle Eaddy Woodberry Dickson (1868–1953) was the first woman elected mayor of Johnsonville and first woman mayor in South Carolina in 1925.

1925

Rosa Belle Eaddy Woodberry Dickson, first woman elected mayor of Johnsonville, South Carolina and first woman mayor in the state.

1952

Martha Priscilla Shaw, first woman elected Mayor of Sumter, South Carolina

1992

Cheryll Woods-Flowers, first woman elected mayor of Mount Pleasant, South Carolina

2008

Elise Partin, first woman elected mayor of Cayce, South Carolina
Alys Lawson, first woman elected mayor of Conway, South Carolina
Pam Lee, first woman elected mayor of Mullins, South Carolina

2023

Hazel Livingston, first woman elected mayor of Lexington, South Carolina

== South Dakota ==
1922

Hattie Pickles, first woman elected mayor in South Dakota, in Clark, South Dakota

1950

Kate Soldat, first woman elected mayor of Sturgis, South Dakota

1981

Delphine "Del" Janusz, first woman elected mayor in Aberdeen, South Dakota

2026

Christine Erickson, first woman elected mayor in Sioux Falls, South Dakota

== Tennessee ==
1940

Mary Ellen Presnell Brendle, first woman mayor of Englewood, Tennessee

1961

May Ross McDowell, first woman elected mayor of Johnson City, Tennessee

1976

Joan Webb, first woman chosen as mayor of Townsend, Tennessee

1997

Margaret Feierabend, first woman chosen as mayor of Bristol, Tennessee

2011

Kim McMillan, first woman elected mayor of Clarksville, Tennessee
Madeline Rogero, first woman elected mayor of Knoxville, Tennessee

2015

Megan Barry, first woman elected mayor of Nashville, Tennessee

== Texas ==
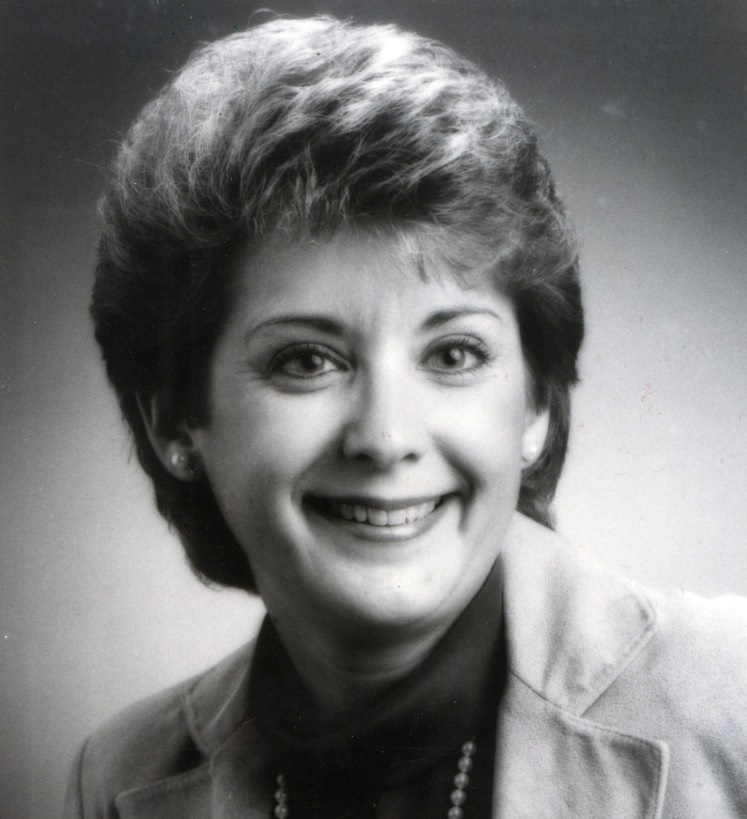
Kathryn J. Whitmire was the first woman elected Mayor of Houston, Texas in 1982.

1917

Ophelia “Birdie” Crosby Harwood, mayor of Marble Falls, Texas

also the first woman mayor in Texas, elected by an all-male vote three years before women were allowed to vote.

1920

Hattie Barnes Adkisson, first woman mayor of Jewett, Texas,

1937

Mary Lucy Kyle Hartson, first woman mayor of Kyle, Texas

1964

Doris Marie Moore, first female elected mayor of Refugio, Texas

1975

Lila Cockrell, first woman elected mayor of San Antonio, Texas

1976

Irma Flores Gonzales, first hispanic, female elected mayor of Lyford, Texas
Adlene Harrison, first woman mayor of Dallas, Texas

1977

Carole Keeton Strayhorn, first woman elected mayor of Austin, Texas

1982

Kathryn J. Whitmire, first woman elected mayor of Houston, Texas

1985

Ann Pomykal, first woman elected mayor of Lewisville, Texas

1986

LaNelle McNamara, first woman elected mayor of Waco, Texas

1987

Annette Strauss, first woman elected mayor of Dallas, Texas
Betty Turner, first woman elected mayor of Corpus Christi, Texas

1989

Suzie Azar, first woman elected mayor of El Paso, Texas

1990

Evelyn Lord, first woman mayor of Beaumont, Texas
Florence Shapiro, first female mayor of Plano, Texas

1991

Kay Granger, first female mayor of Fort Worth, Texas

1996

Kathy Seei, first female mayor of Frisco, Texas

1997

Windy Sitton, first female mayor of Lubbock, Texas

1998

Betty Flores, first woman mayor of Laredo, Texas

1999

Blanca Vela, first woman elected mayor of Brownsville, Texas

2005

Debra McCartt, first woman mayor of Amarillo, Texas

2011

Beth Van Duyne, first woman elected mayor of Irving, Texas

2014

Celeste Sanchez, first woman elected mayor of San Benito, Texas

2015

Laura Hill, first woman elected mayor of Southlake, Texas

== Utah ==
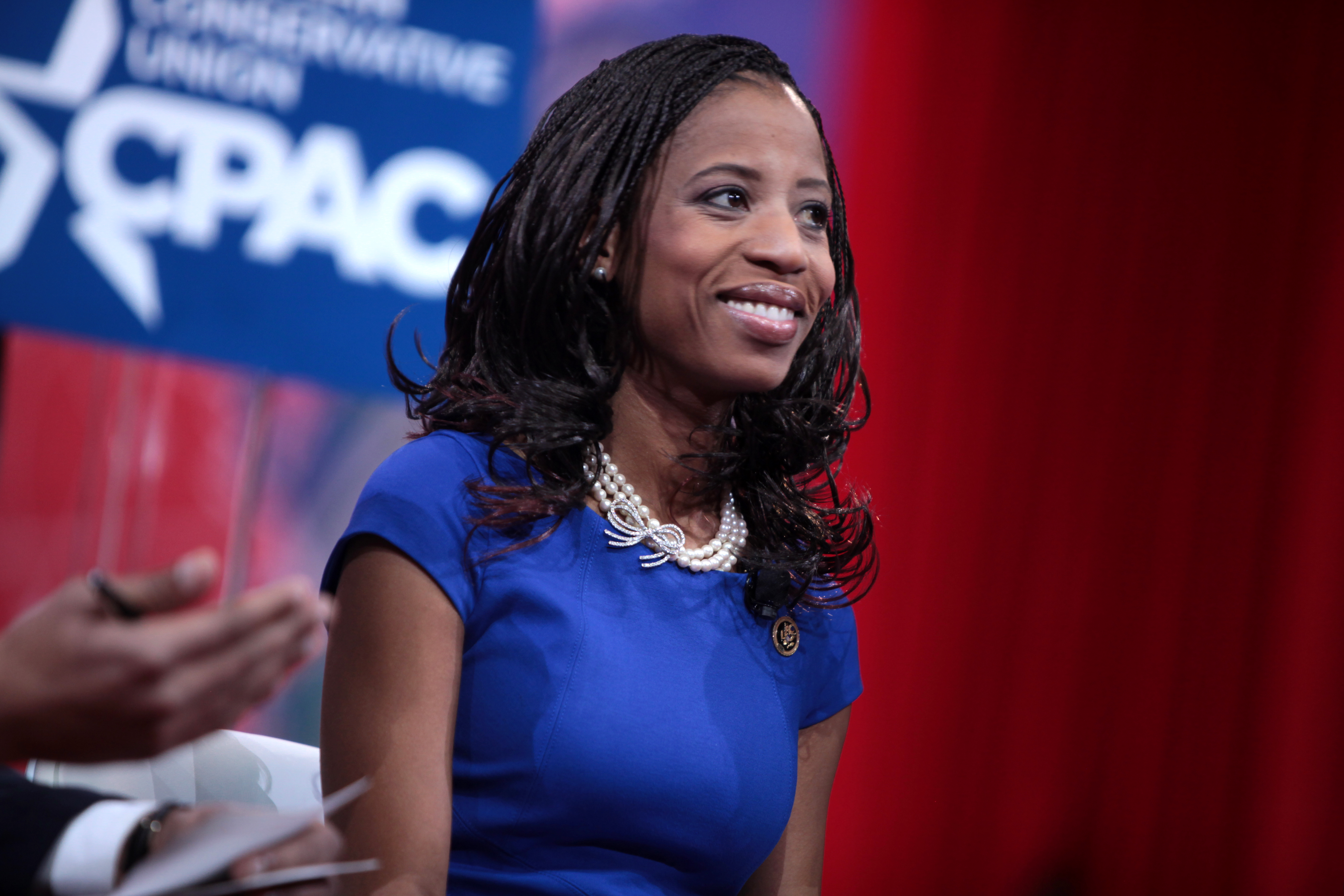
Mia Love was the first woman elected mayor of Saratoga Springs, Utah and the first African American woman elected mayor in the state of Utah.

1912

Mary E. Woolley Chamberlain, first woman mayor of Kanab, Utah

1919

Stena Scorup, first woman mayor of Salina, Utah

1945

Mabel Nielsen, first woman elected mayor of Panguitch, Utah

1982

Sue Marie Young, first woman elected mayor of Richfield, Utah

1991

Cosetta Castagno, first woman elected mayor of Vernon, Utah
Joyce Johnson, first woman mayor of Orem, Utah

1992

Deedee Corradini, first woman elected mayor of Salt Lake City, Utah
Stella Welsh, first woman elected mayor of Orem, Utah

1998

JoAnn Seghini, first woman elected mayor of Midvale, Utah

2009

Melissa Johnson, first woman elected mayor of West Jordan, Utah
Mia Love, first woman elected mayor Saratoga Springs, Utah and first black woman mayor in Utah

2013

Maile Wilson, first woman elected mayor of Cedar City, Utah

2018

Michelle Kaufusi, first woman elected mayor of Provo, Utah

2022

Karen Lang, first woman elected mayor of West Valley City, Utah
Monica Zoltanski, first woman elected mayor of Sandy, Utah

== Vermont ==
1980

Janet Smith, first woman elected mayor of St. Albans, Vermont, less than a week after she was sworn-in Smith was shot and killed at her home.

1986

Sally Rice, first woman elected mayor of Montpelier, Vermont

2019

Kristine Lott, first woman elected mayor of Winooski, Vermont

2024

Emma Mulvaney-Stanak, first woman elected mayor of Burlington, Vermont

== Virginia ==
1930

Callie Wright, first female elected mayor of Troutdale, Virginia

1948

Minnie Miller, first woman elected mayor of Clintwood, Virginia

1950

Dorothy Davis, first woman elected mayor of Washington, Virginia

1962

Eleanor P. Sheppard, first woman elected mayor of Richmond, Virginia

1963

Ann Hitch Kilgore, first woman mayor of Hampton, Virginia

1986

Jessie M. Rattley, first woman and African American elected by fellow Council members as mayor of the City of Newport News, Virginia

1988

Meyera E. Oberndorf, first woman elected mayor of Virginia Beach, Virginia

1991

Patsy Ticer, first woman elected mayor of Alexandria, Virginia

2008

Mimi Elrod, first woman elected mayor of Lexington, Virginia
Linda Johnson, first woman elected mayor of Suffolk, Virginia

2018

Nikuyah Walker, first African-American female mayor of Charlottesville, Virginia.
Treney Tweedy, first woman mayor of Lynchburg, Virginia.

== Washington ==
1919

Helen B. Coe, first woman elected mayor of Langley, Washington

1924

Alice U. Kerr, first woman elected mayor of Edmonds, Washington

1926

Bertha Knight Landes, first woman Mayor of Seattle, Washington and first woman mayor of a major American city

1932

Stella Alexander, first woman mayor of Issaquah, Washington

1953

Amanda Benek Smith, first woman mayor of Olympia, Washington

1975

Betty Edmondson, first woman mayor of Yakima, Washington

1977

Joyce Ebert, first woman to serve as mayor of Everett, Washington

1980

Barbara Shinpoch, first woman to serve as mayor of Renton, Washington.

1986

Vicki McNeill, first woman to serve as mayor of Spokane, Washington

2010

Marilyn Strickland, first woman to serve as mayor of Tacoma, Washington

2012

Kelli Linville, first woman elected mayor of Bellingham, Washington

2017

Anne McEnerny-Ogle first woman elected mayor of Vancouver, Washington
Cassie Franklin, first woman elected Mayor of Everett, Washington

== West Virginia ==
1937

Stella Eddy, first woman mayor of Friendly, West Virginia

1972

Dorothy Comuntzis, first woman mayor of Morgantown, West Virginia

1985

Stella C. Koerner first woman mayor of Wheeling, West Virginia

1993

Jean Dean, first woman mayor of Huntington, West Virginia
Nancy Cartmill, first woman mayor of Barboursville, West Virginia

2018

Amy Shuler Goodwin, first woman mayor of Charleston, West Virginia

2023

Anne Bolyard, first woman mayor of Fairmont, West Virginia

== Wisconsin ==
1923

Lulu P. Shaw, first woman mayor of the City of Crandon, Wisconsin.

1934

Mary Spellman, first woman mayor of Beaver Dam, Wisconsin

1997

Susan J. M. Bauman, first woman elected mayor of Madison, Wisconsin

== Wyoming ==
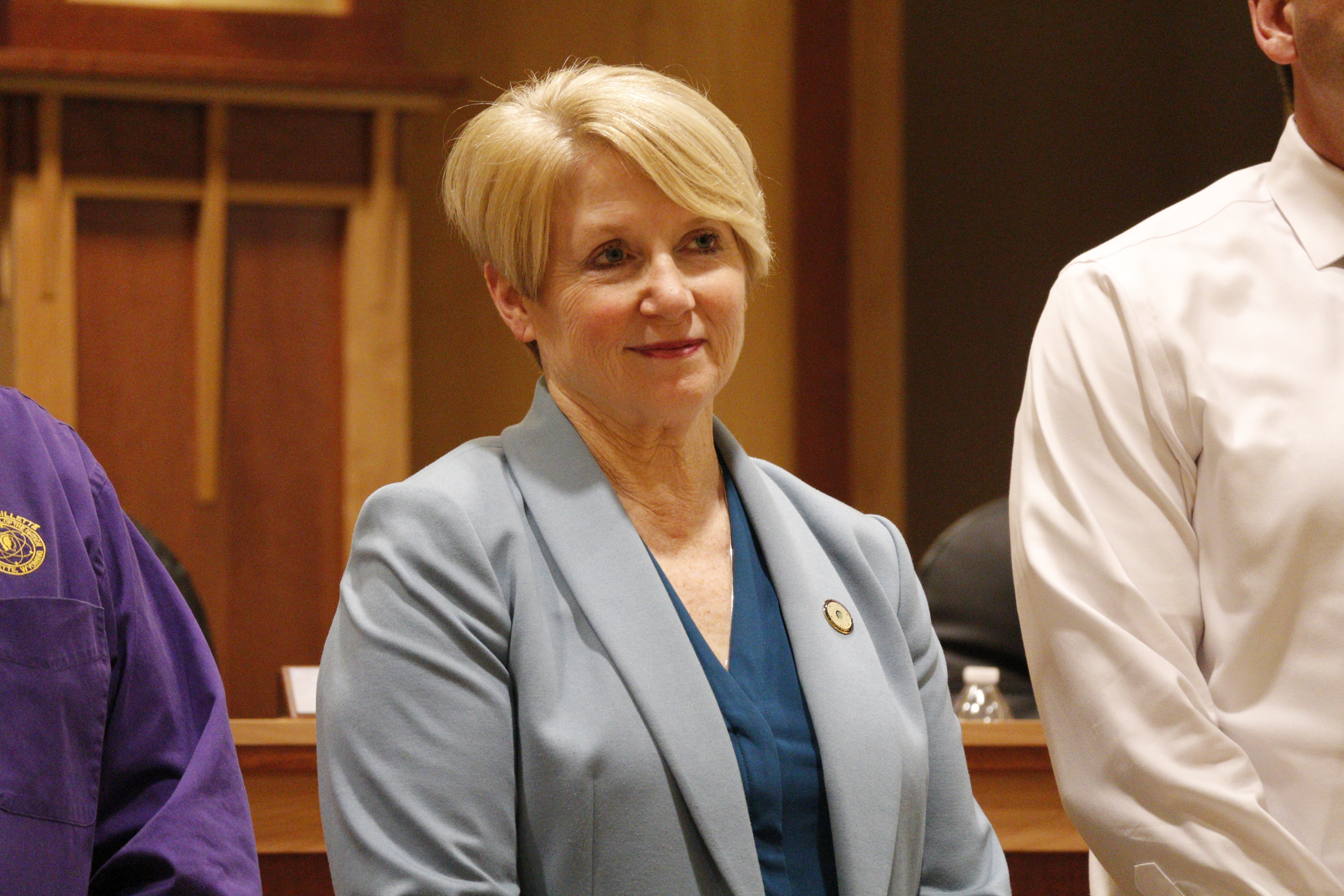
Mayor of Gillette, Wyoming Louise Carter-King honoring a veteran Gillette Police Department officer at a City Council meeting in Gillette, Wyoming

1912

Susan Wissler, mayor of Dayton, Wyoming

Wissler was the first woman mayor in Wyoming

1920

Grace Miller, first woman elected mayor of Jackson, Wyoming

1922

Ethel Stoner, first woman elected mayor of Cokeville, Wyoming

1938

Nettie Terrill, first woman elected mayor of Dixon, Wyoming

1957

Josephine Fey, first woman mayor in Laramie, Wyoming

1965

Maxine Patterson, first woman elected mayor of Edgerton, Wyoming

2008

Nancy Tia Brown, first woman elected mayor of Cody, Wyoming

2014

Louise Carter-King, first woman elected mayor of Gillette, Wyoming

2016

Marian Orr, first woman elected mayor of Cheyenne, Wyoming

== U.S. territories and associated states ==
=== Guam ===
2001

Concepcion Duenas, first woman elected mayor of Tamuning, Guam

=== District of Columbia ===
1990

Sharon Pratt Kelly, first woman elected Mayor of the District of Columbia

=== Northern Mariana Islands ===
2014

Marian Tudela, first woman mayor of Saipan

=== Puerto Rico ===
1946

Felisa Rincón de Gautier, first woman mayor of San Juan, Puerto Rico and first woman mayor of a capital city in United States soil

== See also ==
- List of first women mayors
- List of the first women holders of political offices in the United States
