= Barbara Shinpoch =

American politician (1931–2005)

- Died: March 9, 2005 (aged 73)
- Occupations: Chair, Washington Horse Racing Commission; Mayor, City of Renton, Washington
- Political party: Democratic Party
- Spouse: A. N. "Bud" Shinpoch

Barbara Shinpoch (June 19, 1931 - March 9, 2005) served as the mayor of Renton, Washington from 1980 to 1988. She was the first woman to hold the office. Shinpoch chaired the Washington state Horse Racing Commission from 1993 to 2001, and she was credited by some with preserving the sport of thoroughbred horse racing in the state. She presided over the commission during the contest to replace Longacres Racetrack, the only track in western Washington, with what would become Emerald Downs Racetrack in Auburn.

== Career ==
Barbara Shinpoch began her political career in the mid-1950s as an advocate for mentally handicapped children, and decided to run for office "about the time a Renton councilman told [her] he didn't think [she] was qualified." "My competitive instincts were aroused by that councilman," she told an interviewer in 1977. Shinpoch and her husband had been active in Democratic Party politics, and she was appointed to an open Renton City Council seat in 1977. She was re-elected to the city council in 1978, and then ran successfully for mayor in 1979; she was re-elected in 1984. During her two terms, Shinpoch presided over the city's purchase of Maplewood Golf Course, the creation of Gene Coulon Memorial Beach Park, the adjustment of city boundaries, and the establishment of a food bank in Renton. She also guided the city's strategy to zone porn theaters out of downtown Renton, a case that ultimately reached the Supreme Court in City of Renton v. Playtime Theatres Inc. (1986). As Renton's first female mayor, she worked hard to expand opportunities for women, and mentored the city's second woman mayor, Kathy Keolker.

In 1993 Gov. Mike Lowry appointed Shinpoch chair of the three-member Washington Horse Racing Commission. The commission's primary task during her tenure was replacing Longacres Racetrack, the only track in western Washington, with a suitable venue for thoroughbred horse racing; Longacres had been sold to the Boeing Co. in 1992 for development as an office campus. Under Shinpoch's leadership, the commission reviewed applications from consortia from several Washington cities, as well as working with the Army Corps of Engineers, to site and oversee the construction of the new track. Horse racing in Washington state was a $400-million-a-year industry in 1993, and owners and trainers lobbied for quick construction despite competing proposals and the need for environmental studies. The pick of Auburn for the track was controversial, but Shinpoch was convinced it was the best location. "There were other interests that wanted the track in other places. They were brutal -- and they were wrong," Gov. Lowry remembered in 2005. "Barbara had the tenacity to hang in there and thoroughbred racing is in Washington state today because of her." Emerald Downs Racetrack finally opened to the public on June 20, 1996.

Shinpoch continued as chair of the Washington Racing Commission until her resignation in January 2001. The Barbara Shinpoch Stakes at Emerald Downs opened for two-year-old fillies in spring 2001 with a $55,000 purse.

She was married to Washington state legislator A. N. "Bud" Shinpoch from 1953 until his death in 2001.
