= Lena Culver Hawkins =

American major and suffragist

Lena Culver Hawkins (September 23, 1866 - June 6, 1949) was one of the first female mayors in the United States and a suffragist associated with the National American Women Suffrage Association (NAWSA) and served as secretary of the Florida Federation of Woman's Clubs for twenty years. She was also an advocate for the Good Roads Movement.

== Personal life ==
Lena H. Culver was born in Laurence, Michigan, the second of five children to Anson Brewster Culver and Emma Spooner Hand. As a descendant of John Alden, her family had first arrived in the United States on the Mayflower. Hawkins was a five feet tall and was known for always wearing high heeled shoes.

She married Charles Edwin Hawkins on September 15, 1891 in Chicago, Illinois. Charles owned the Queen City Paper Company in Cincinnati, Ohio. The Hawkins' son, Allan, was born in 1893. They left Chicago for Manhattan, New York before moving to Brooksville, Florida in 1911. They lived in a home at 510 E Liberty Street in the city of Brooksville, built just six years before their arrival. Lena and Allan lived in Brooksville full time, while Charles wintered there and otherwise lived at the Cincinnati Club. The Hawkins family became connected to the Brooksville's founding families and the when Allan married Margaret Bell.

== Civic activity ==
Hawkins immediately became involved in Brooksville, active in twenty two organizations and in leadership of many of them. Often teaming with philanthropist and reformer Margaret Dreier Robins, she helped establish a local YWCA, the first free lending library, and a secretarial college for women. She served six years as President of the GFWC Historic Brooksville Woman's Club President (1917-1923), and stayed active after her presidency, organizing fundraisers so the club could build its own facility. Obtaining land in the 1920s, they made it into a garden and began growing sweet potatoes and other produce. Proceeds were used to construct the building with Hawkins functioning as both the Clubhouse Architect and Construction Supervisor.

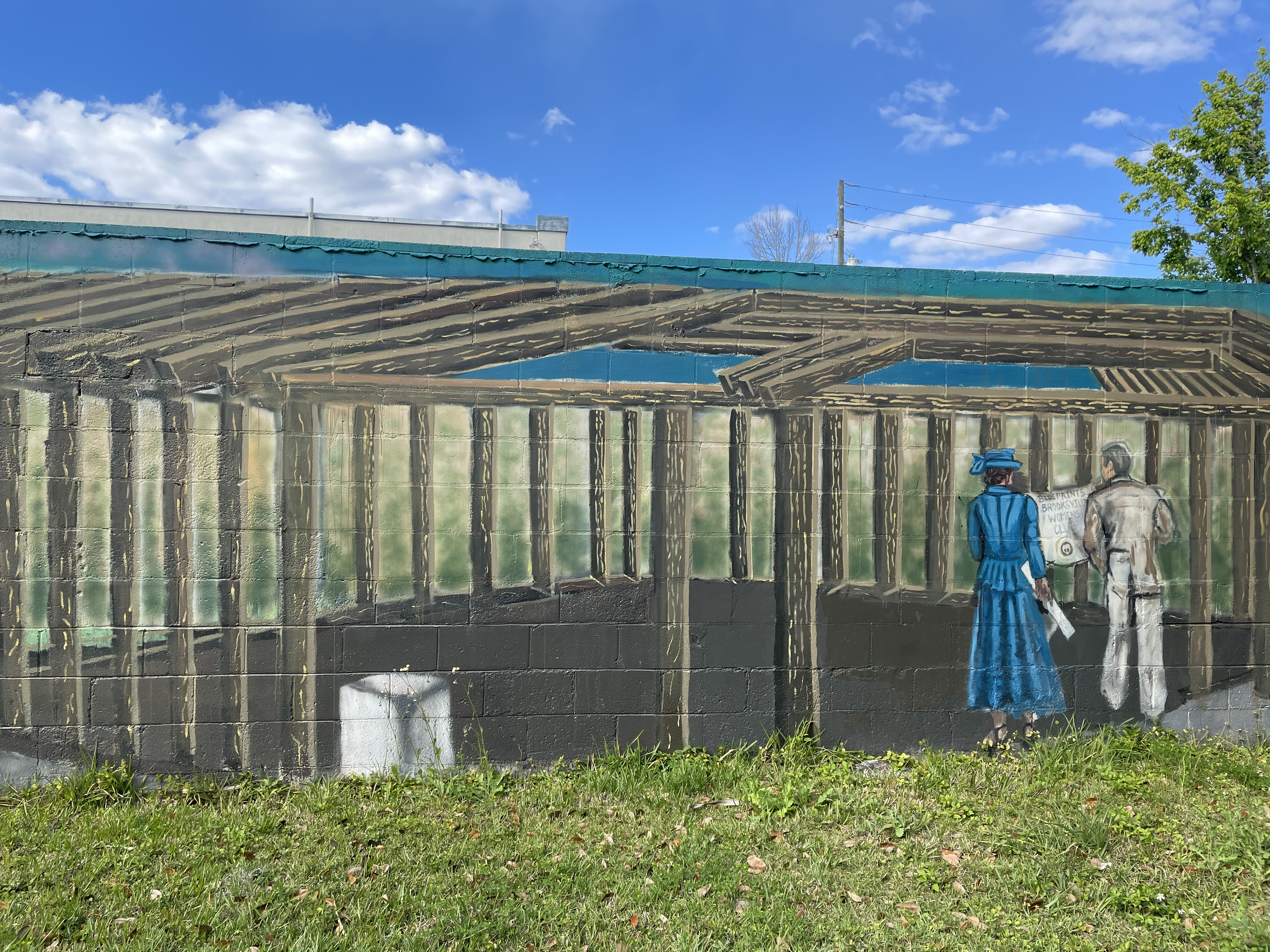
Portion of a mural at the Woman's Club depicting Hawkins' work in overseeing clubhouse construction

At the State level, Hawkins was Florida's General Federation of Woman's Clubs Recording Secretary for twenty years. She also served on their Good Roads Committee. As Secretary of the Chamber of Commerce, Hawkins and other local leaders wrote an invitation to visit Brooksville to George V to recover his health. Hawkins ran for Brooksville City Mayor in 1927 and lost by 34 votes. The following year she was the first to enter the race and no one opposed her. Her central platform was making Brooksville the "prettiest town in Florida." The election made newspapers statewide. An editorial by The Miami Herald concluded as such,

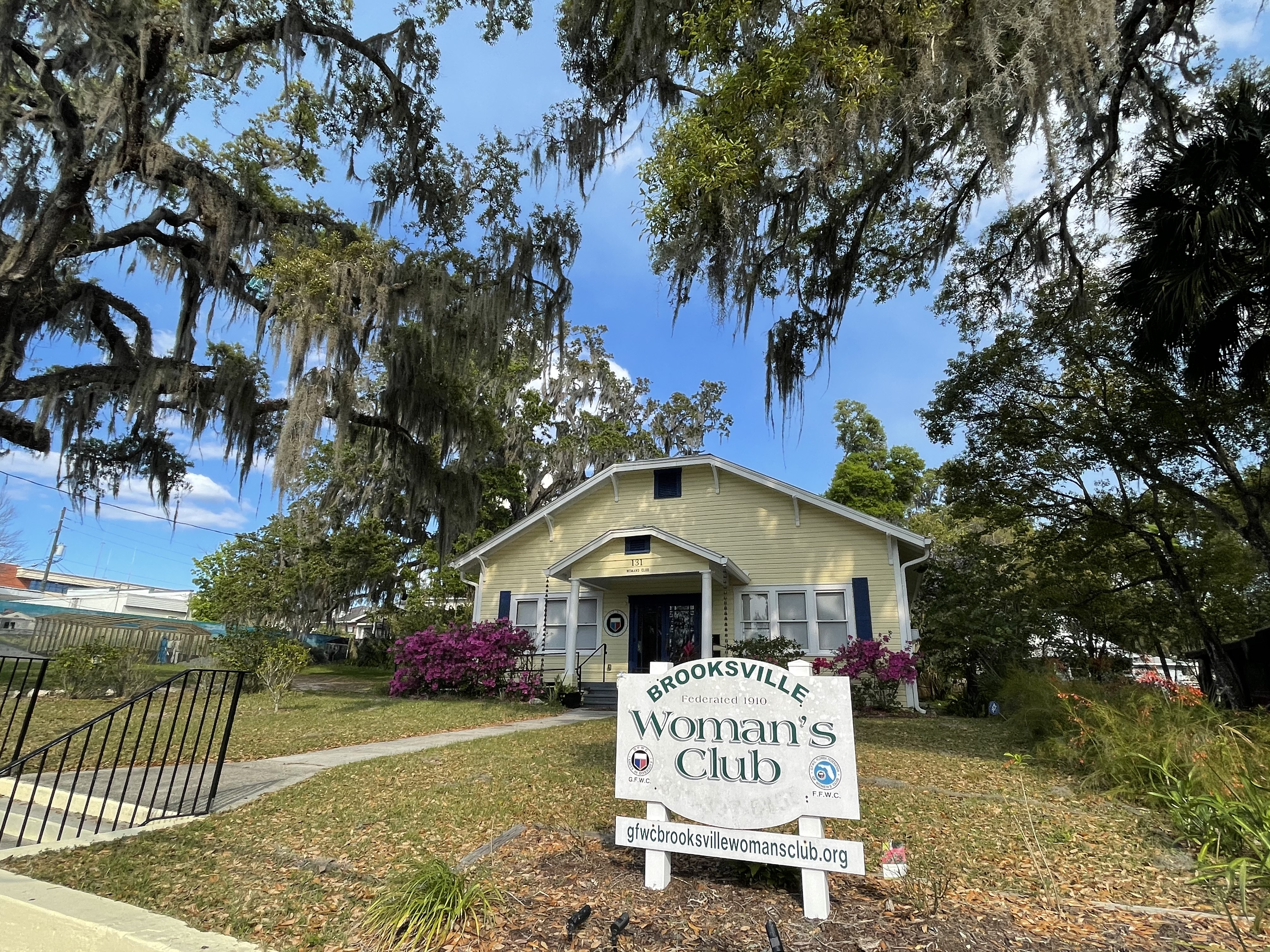
GFWC Historic Brooksville Woman's Club - Hawkins designed the building and oversaw its construction

"In such a setting it is unusual to find a woman commanding the votes of the principal city. That she has succeeded is a token of her own great worth and of the advancing of political light into some of the darker political corners of Florida. We hope she succeeds, for Brooksville has possibilities of becoming a very beautiful place."

In addition to planting many trees and flowers in the city, Hawkins' administration also endeavored to improve infrastructure. They took the unusual tourist approach of suspending all traffic laws for a week, touting cars "may park at any and all angles, and as long as they desire" and instead of giving traffic tickets, gave away citrus fruits, and free tourist editions of the Brooksville Herald.

Hawkins' year in office was fraught with uncontrollable disasters. She gave a speech to the Winter Haven Chamber of Commerce on those problems, asserting "Florida has had enough B's in her bonnet":

"Mrs. Hawkins spoke on the four Bs that have affected Florida - the 'Boom, Blows, Bugs, and Banks,' declaring the boom was over, that the storms had not harmed Florida, that the fruit fly was proving a blessing in disguise by fostering closer cooperation and diversification in agriculture, and that the weeding out of weak banks would result advantageously in the rebuilding of Florida."

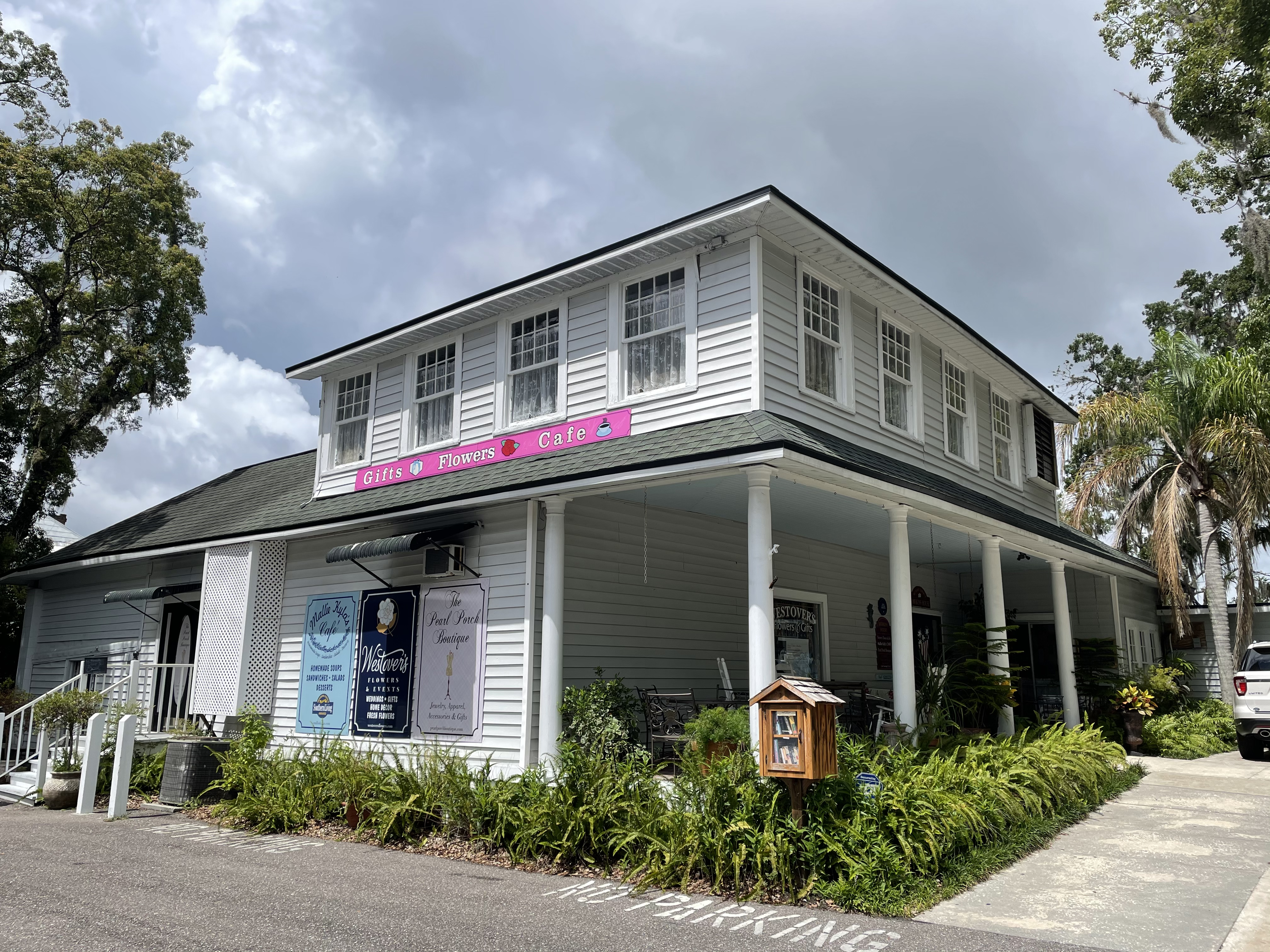
The Hawkins House in 2021

She was defeated in her reelection bid by the last minute entry of former mayor Charles Price into the race and lost by a margin of 151-58. She later ran an unsuccessful bid for the Florida State Legislature.

== Death and legacy ==
Hawkins died in her home at 512 E Liberty Street at 6pm on June 6, 1949 and is buried with her husband and son at the Brooksville Cemetery, both of whom had preceded her in death.

Hawkins was named "Great Floridian" in 2000 and a plaque commemorating the honor is outsider her home, "The Hawkins House," which now houses retail and restaurants to three female owned businesses.

in 2021, a group of vigilante planters set on beautifying the city named themselves "Lena Lives" after Hawkins.
