= List of mayors of Summit, New Jersey =

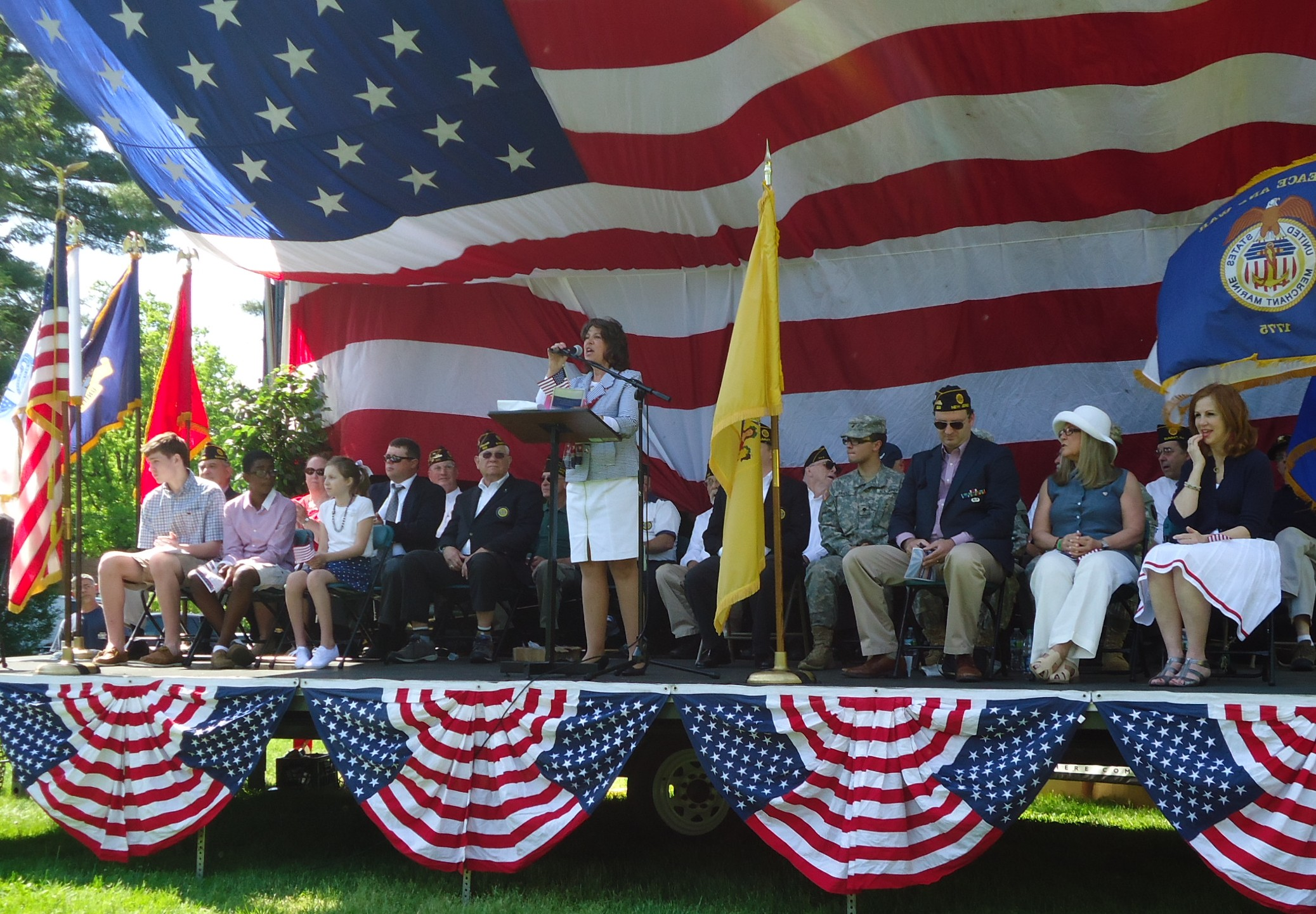
Former mayor Ellen Dickson speaks at Memorial Day

The chief executive of the city of Summit, New Jersey since it was incorporated in 1899 has been a mayor. Currently the city operates under a weak mayor system of municipal government where the mayor is mostly a ceremonial role that operates as the city's official spokesman. They do not have the power to vote in the city council (common council), unless in the event of a tie. However, they can use their office as a bully pulpit to promote and oppose candidates for other positions in the city. Additionally they can appoint the chief of police and the board of education. In the 1970s the term for a mayor was lengthened from 2 years to 4 years; there are no term limits.

== Summit Township ==
On March 23, 1869, Summit separated from New Providence as its own Township and was governed by a three member executive committee dominated by the Democratic Party. Starting in the 1880s, local Republicans led by Jonathan Bonnel began to campaign for turning the township into a city, arguing that the executive committee didn't have the powers necessary to properly govern the rapidly growing population. The Democrats, who were in office in the committee, where generally opposed to the incorporation, with the deadlock being broken by William Z. Larned, a prominent local banker, who formed a committee to explore the best form of government. Larned found in favor of the Republicans, saying that “When one has grown to a man’s size, he can no longer wear child’s clothes; and it is the same with a town when it has grown to the population of a city, its township clothing was outgrown.” On April 11, 1899, the township held a vote to determine if they should incorporate as a city, which passed 804 to 163. Additionally, elections where held to elect the first Common Council and mayor, with Republican George H. Wilcox winning the mayoralty, and 5 Republicans and 2 Democrats being elected to the council.

== Mayors of Summit ==
Number	Mayor	Party	Term begins	Term ends	Notes	References
1st	George H. Wilcox	Republican	1899	1902	First mayor of Summit, wife ran a women's political club. Most of the city's services would be created under his tenure, including the longstanding tradition of the mayor and common council members working without pay. Would narrowly lose his re-election bid.	
2nd	George W. Baldwin	Democratic	1902	1904	Elected to the inaugural Common council in 1899 and passed the first municipal ordinance. The city's first Democratic mayor, and only Democratic mayor for almost a century. Was named postmaster of Summit in 1915 by Woodrow Wilson. Later founded Summit's Elk Lodge.	
3rd	George H. Wilcox	Republican	1904	1908	Wilcox would return, beating Baldwin during his re-election bid. Expanded infrastructure and municipal services such as paved roads, and water, sewer, and electric systems. Would win re-election in 1905 unopposed. City Democrats would be out of the Common Council until 2000.	
4th	J. Boyd Risk	Independent	1908	1909	Lafayette College educated doctor from Muncy, Pennsylvania. Moved to Summit in 1892 and opened a practice. A dedicated philanthropist, he served on the common council and ran numerous charities. Risk was not affiliated with the local Republican Party establishment and sought to expand local government, buying the building that would eventually become city hall.	
5th	G. F. Vreeland	Republican	1909	1910		
6th	Wm. Newton Adams	Independent	1910	1914	Father of James Truslow Adams, opened the Summit Public Library and oversaw the phasing out of horse-drawn carriages.	
7th	Francis H. Bergen	?	1914	1916		
8th	Ruford Franklin	Republican	1916	1920	Later served as Republican Party representative	
9th	Oliver B. Merrill	Republican	1920	1924	An early pioneer in advertising and common councilman. Dedicated and moved the city's administration to a new city hall in 1924.	
10th	Walter S. Topping	Republican	1924	1926	Former Common Councilman and Common Council president.	
11th	George D. Cornish	?	1926	1930		
12th	Edward Bancroft Twombly	Republican	1930	1932	A Yale educated lawyer, he served as corporal with the N.J. Cavalry Essex Troop during the Pancho Villa Expedition. Additionally served with the 77th U.S. Expeditionary Force during World War I earning a Silver Star for bravery. Elected to the common council in 1921 and was council president by time of election.	
13th	Edward T. Snook	Republican	1932	1935	Also a veteran of the Cavalry Essex Troop, lead the city through the Great Depression, established relief programs but slashed the infrastructure budget. Did not seek re-election to another term.	
14th	James W. Bancker	Republican	1935	1939	Born in London to American parents, Bancker served as Vice President of Western Electric and as director of Bell Labs and was holding office as a Common Councilman from 1931 until his mayoral election in 1935.	
15th	Guido F. Forster	Republican	1939	1943	Led the city through most of World War II on a pan-democratic, patriotic platform. Temporarily replaced due his Navy activities by Burton L. Boyle.	
16th	G. Harry Cullis	Republican	1943	1946	A veteran of the 77th Division during World War I, chose not to seek re-election. Lead the city through the latter half of World War II, coordinated heavily with the Summit War Finance Committee on war bond and clothing drives.	
17th	Maxwell Lester, Jr.	Republican	1946	1950	Former common councilor. From 1941 until 1977 he was director of Civil Defense for Summit.	
18th	Percival M. Bland	Republican	1950	1956	Elected to the common council in 1939. Declined to seek an additional term and retired in 1956. At the time he was the longest serving mayor in Summit history.	
19th	C. Philip Dean	Republican	1956	1958	From the Dean "founding family" of pioneers which settled East Summit in the 1770s, he served on the common council since 1946. Refused to seek a second term as he viewed public service as a short-term civic duty rather than a long political career.	
20th	Ogden D. Gensemer	Republican	1958	1963	Resigned as mayor due to his heavy business schedule as manager of the Transoceanic Cable Ship Company where he oversaw the laying of underwater cables.	
21st	David E. Trucksess	Republican	1963	1969	Appointed to council to fill vacant seat of newly elected mayor Ogden D. Gensemer in 1958. When Gensemer resigned he became interim mayor before winning election in 1965 and re-election in 1967. Declined to run for re-election in 1970.	
22nd	Elmer J. Bennett	Republican	1969	1976	Won re-election in the 1973 election. This, combined with then council president Frank Lehr's re-drawing of ward district boundaries in 1972 levied accusations of gerrymandering and ultimately resulted in a lawsuit to split the city in half east to west which was defeated in the New Jersey Supreme Court.	
23rd	Frank Lehr	Republican	1976	1984	Former Marine who served in the Korean War. Was appointed to a vacant position on the common council in 1962 and longtime council president. Served 20 years in Summit municipal politics.	
24th	Robert Hartlaub	Republican	1984	1988	Remembered for pressuring police chief Frank Formichella to issue warrants for disciplinary records at Summit Junior High. The records, containing tardiness information, reprimands for chewing gum and accounts of snowball fights, where ordered to be returned by Union County Prosecutor, John H. Stamler.	
25th	Janet Whitman	Republican	1988	1996	First female mayor of Summit. Remained a highly regarded community leader across the political spectrum after leaving office.	
26th	Walter Long	Republican	1996	2003	Known for his extensive renovations of downtown Summit. Presided over the year long centennial celebration in 1999.	
27th	Jordan Glatt	Democratic	2003	2011	Elected in 2003, and re-elected in 2007 with 60% of the vote. Represented the city's shift away from a strong Republican city to a strong Democratic city. Led the city through recovery efforts following Hurricane Irene.	
28th	Ellen Dickson	Republican	2011	2015	Won a three-way split mayoral race with 39% of the vote.	
29th	Nora Radest	Democratic	2015	2023	Defeated incumbent mayor Ellen Dickson in 2015, ran unopposed in 2019. Final term mired by backlash to the high-destiny low income Broad Street West Redevelopment, chose to not seek re-election in 2023.	
30th	Elizabeth Fagan	Republican	2023	Present	Following the announcement of the Broad Street West Redevelopment, the Republican party launched a concerted effort to dislodge the Democratic administration in the city seeing Fagan defeat Democrat David Naidu, as well as flipping three Democratic common council seats.	
