= Katherine Mayo Cowan =

American politician

Mayor of Wilmington, North Carolina
- In office 1924–1925
- Preceded by: James H. Cowan
- Succeeded by: Walter H. Blair

Personal details
- Born: Katherine Elizabeth Mayo; January 10, 1883
- Died: December 5, 1975 (aged 92)
- Resting place: Oakdale Cemetery, Wilmington, North Carolina, U.S.

Katherine Mayo Cowan (January 10, 1883 – December 5, 1975) was the first woman mayor in North Carolina, and as of 2021, the only woman to serve as mayor of Wilmington, North Carolina.

== Early life ==
Katherine Elizabeth Mayo was born on January 10, 1883, the daughter of William E. Mayo and Mary Agnes Mayo.

== Career ==
In 1921, Cowan's husband James was elected mayor. When he died in office, she was appointed to fill his term. She was a member of the local chapter of the League of Women Voters and was the local representative to the 1925 national convention.

Cowan ran to be mayor for a second term, although spent no money on her campaign, and did not actively campaign for office. Cowan lost the election. According to an account in 1929, "Mrs. Cowan served during the closing months of 1924 and until June 1925 when she yielded the reins of office….to Mr. Walter H. Blair, elected in May 1925."

By 1930, Cowan lived in Charlotte, and was a saleslady at a dry goods store.

In the 1930s, Cowan was active in Democratic politics in Washington, DC. By the late 1930s, Cowan was a supervisor with the Works Progress Administration.

== Personal life ==
Katherine Cowan married James Hill Cowan in 1904. They eloped after a brief engagement. At the time, the newspaper reported "The bride is a young woman of striking personality and charming manner."

By 1920, the Cowans lived on 214 Nun Street, James was the secretary of the Chamber of Commerce. He and Katherine had five children, aged 14 years old to five months old.

She died on December 5, 1975, at the age of 92, and is buried in Oakdale Cemetery in Wilmington.

== See also ==
- List of first women mayors in the United States
