= Jordan Glatt =

American politician

Mayor Jordan Glatt

27th Mayor of Summit
- In office 2003–2011
- Preceded by: Walter Long
- Succeeded by: Ellen Dickson

New Jersey Shared Service Czar
- In office 2018–Incumbent

Personal details
- Party: Democratic

Jordan Glatt is an American politician who served as mayor of Summit, New Jersey. The city's 27th mayor, he was the second Democrat to hold the office. He is currently the Shared Service Czar alongside former Harding mayor Nicolas Platt in the administration of New Jersey Governor Phil Murphy.

== Early life ==
Before entering politics, Glatt was the Chief marketing officer of a social media start up Free All Media, while also serving on its board of directors. Starting in 1999, he was the Chief executive officer of a household consumer company Magla Products, which is valued at $90,000,000.

== Political career ==
=== Mayor of Summit ===
Before being elected the second Democratic mayor of Summit in 2005, Glatt had also been elected the first Democratic member of the City Council in 2001 since 1899. As mayor, he is most remembered for leading Summit through Hurricane Irene, during which he became increasingly exasperated towards JCP&L, and its inability to provide a timely recovery of the city's power. His feud with the company reared its head a second time during the 2011 Halloween nor'easter when JCP&L left most of the city stranded without power for weeks.

=== Post Mayoral career ===
After leaving office, Glatt served on the Wofford College Board of Trustees and was a member of the New Jersey Economic Growth Council. He was vice chairman of the New Jersey Gaming and Horse Racing Commission the New Jersey president of the Young Presidents' Organization. Glatt has also served on the boards of the International Housewares Association and Students in Free Enterprise. He also joined the Community Foundation of New Jersey as Director of Strategic Partnerships. Glatt has also remained active in Union County Democratic politics, endorsing Tom Malinowski during his 2018 election. Shortly after, he was named one of the two Shared Service Czars in Governor Phil Murphy's administration alongside Republican and former Harding mayor Nicolas Platt.

Glatt was named the "Vice President for Advancement and Special Assistant to the President" at Centenary University on July 31, 2023.
