= Rita Ellis (politician) =

First woman mayor of Delray Beach, Florida

Rita Ellis (May 5, 1950 – March 15, 2025) was the first woman elected as mayor of Delray Beach, Florida, USA. She was elected to a two-year term in 2007 but did not seek re-election in 2009 for health reasons. Ellis had served as a city commissioner in seat one for Delray Beach from 2005 to 2007; she ran for this seat unopposed.

In 2009, Ellis was given the key to the city of Delray Beach. Shortly after her death, the City Commission of Delray Beach proclaimed March 27, 2025, as a day to honor Rita Ellis.

== See also ==
- List of first women mayors in the United States
- List of first women mayors
