= Mayors of Ramsey, New Jersey =

Ramsey, New Jersey was incorporated as a borough by an act of the New Jersey Legislature on March 10, 1908, from portions of Hohokus Township (whose remnants are now Mahwah Township). Additional territory was annexed from Waldwick in 1921, and portions of the borough were ceded to Saddle River in 1925.

== Mayors ==
Democratic (5) Republican (17)

#	Mayor	Took office	Left office	Party	Notes
1	John B. Finch	April 27, 1908	1910	Republican	The first mayor, elected at a special election held on April 27, 1908. Reelected for a full two -year term at the general election in November, 1908, he served until 1910.
2	James Shuart	1911	1912	Democratic	First Democratic mayor.
3	F. William Gertzen	1913	1916	Republican	Served as mayor of Ramsey for a total of seven terms. His service started in 1913 and at this time he served two terms, 1913–16. Called by his townsman again in 1925 he served three two-year terms, 1925–30. In 1941 he was again elected mayor and served two two-year terms, 1941–44.
4	John Frank DeBaun	1917	1920	Republican	Served two terms.
5	Frederick W. Storer	1921	1924	Republican	Served two terms.
6	F. William Gertzen	1925	1930	Republican	Served three terms
7	John J. Sullivan	1931	1934	Democrat	Served two terms.
8	Dwight P. Little	1935	1940	Republican	Served three terms.
9	F. William Gertzen	1941	1944	Republican	Served two terms
10	Franklin D. Haring	1945	1948	Republican	Served three terms.
11	Chester A. Smeltzer	1949	1952	Republican	Served two terms. Wrote The Birth of Ramsey in 1976.
12	Harold E. Murken	1953	1954	Republican	
13	Alexander Eichorn	1955	1956	Republican	
14	John S. Elliot	1957	1960	Republican	Served two terms.
15	Paul R. Huot	1961	1962	Democrat	
16	Victor M. Williams	1963	1968	Republican	Served three terms.
17	Salvatore Burgio	1969	1974	Republican	
18	Emil Porfido	1975	1987	Democrat	
19	John L. Scerbo	1988	2002	Republican	
20	Richard Muti	2003	2006	Democrat	Changed parties and ran in 2014 election
21	Christopher Botta	2007	2014	Republican	Chose not to seek re-election
22	Deirdre A. Dillon	2015	incumbent	Republican	first woman mayor

Table Data Source
