= Gene Coulon Memorial Beach Park =

Park in King County, Washington, United States

- Coulon Park
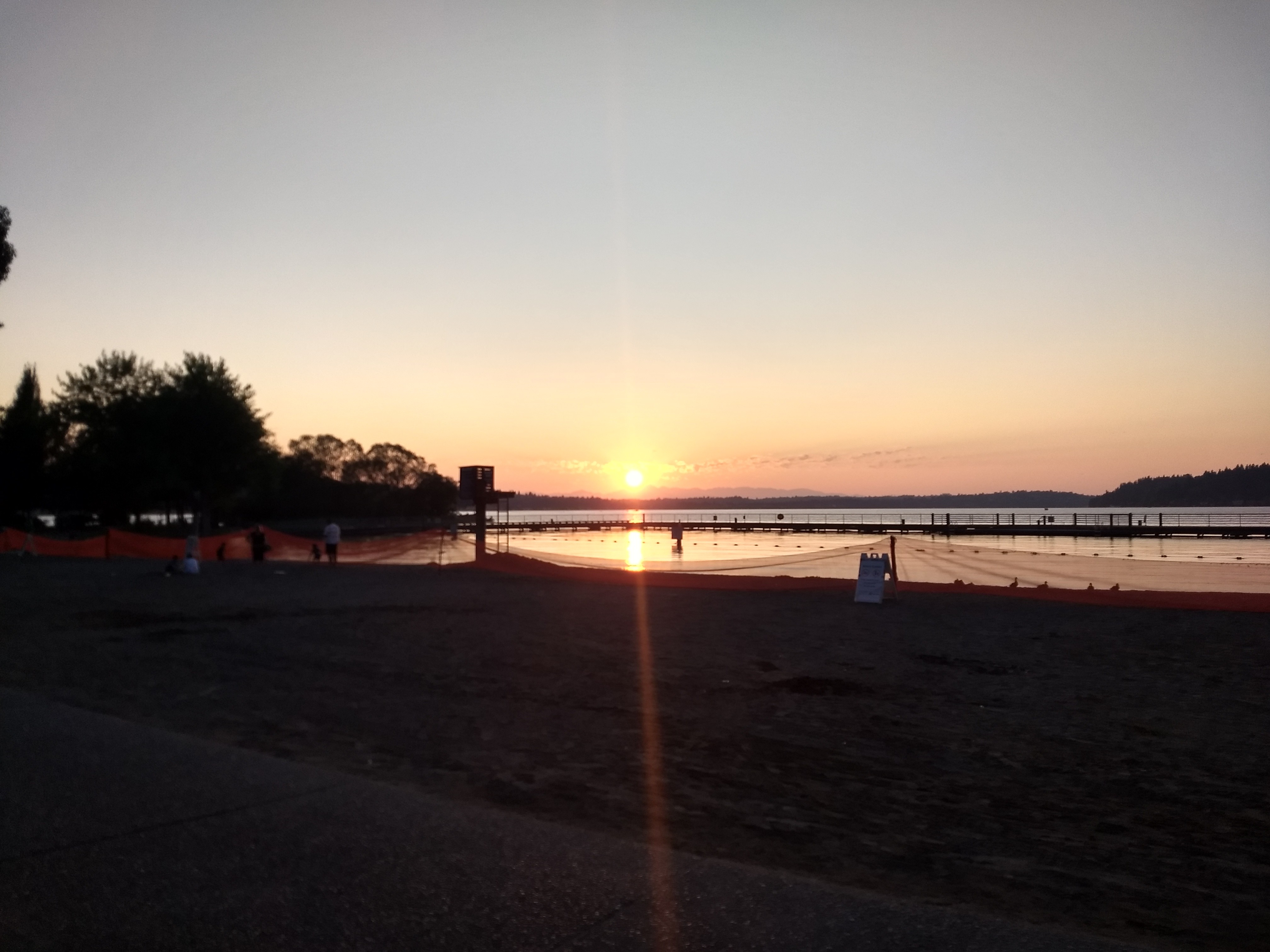

- Location within Washington (state)
- Location: Renton, Washington
- Coordinates: 47°30′15″N 122°12′05″W
- Area: 57 acres (23 ha)
- Established: 1982
- Owner: City of Renton
- Open: All year

Gene Coulon Memorial Beach Park (once named Lake Washington Beach Park) is a public park located in Renton, Washington along the southeastern shore of Lake Washington. It consists of 57 acres of land and water, including 5 acres of grass and 5,400 feet of shoreline. Its amenities include a swimming beach, an eight-lane boat launch, two restaurants, a 900-foot pier/water walk, two miles of paths and trails, a newly renovated park, and tennis courts.

== History ==
Located in between Lake Washington’s shore and industrial railroads, the site was previously used for various industrial purposes throughout the late 19th and early 20th century.

Following the discovery of a major coal deposit in Coal Creek on the eastern side of Lake Washington in 1863, the site’s location was considered ideal for coal transportation. Coal was transported from Lake Washington to Seattle and eventually San Francisco. A horse-drawn coal barge loading dock for the local mines facilitated this exportation, which designated the land as an industrial surplus area for coal dumping. Beginning in the early 20th century, the site was utilized for the logging industry. This included log dumping/storage in Lake Washington, log production with the use of an on-site sand mill, and log shipping via Lake Washington. The land was also used for war-time ship fitting and surplus ship storage. During the park’s initial construction, WWII fighter plane parts were discovered beneath the water.

As the work environment of Renton transitioned from industrial businesses to large companies during the WWII era, the land's industrial purposes came to an end. The park was then used as a casual recreation spot for locals to enjoy the outdoors. Swimming lessons were held in Lake Washington, and citizens held picnics on the beach.

The park is named after Gene L. Coulon, director of the Renton Parks Department from 1949 until his death in 1977. Coulon was born in 1916 in Seattle, Washington and attended the University of Washington where he played collegiate basketball. After graduation he served in the U.S army in World War II, then returned to Washington to work for the Renton Department of Parks and Recreation in 1947. During his time as director, he was respected for his attention to diversity and balance of programs within the department, including the development of the Carco Theatre. He supervised the development of 21 city parks—the most notable being his vision for Lake Washington Beach Park, the area that Gene Coulon Beach Park now occupies. Before city development, Lake Washington Beach park was littered with industrial debris from the historic use of the land. Coulon envisioned a new public park that would respect the land's history and make Renton a desirable place to live.

== Development ==
In the 1950s the City of Renton expanded its Recreation Department to accommodate the recreational needs of its citizens. This led to the creation of several new public projects including Renton's first public swimming pool in 1955, and the development of Gene Coulon Memorial Beach Park's land.

In 1955, the City of Renton acquired 23 acres of Lake Washington shore land in a property exchange with the Pacific Coast Railroad Company. The land was cleared by 1963 and made into Lake Washington Beach Park, but there was not enough money available for a full park development. In 1976, the Land and Water Conservation Fund provided the necessary money by contributing $269,576, matching the State and local contribution. Further money was attained through the State's allocation of surplus Department of Housing and Urban Development money, which was used to purchase 32 more acres. In 1978 (the year following Gene Coulon's death), the park was dedicated to Coulon and plans for a reconstruction began. The following year, Renton purchased the final 2.5 acres of land and gained voters' approval for a 7.9 million dollar bond issue for a park expansion. The full development was completed in 1982, which was marked by an opening ceremony commemorating Gene Coulon’s service to the public as well as the community’s support which made the park possible.

== Design ==
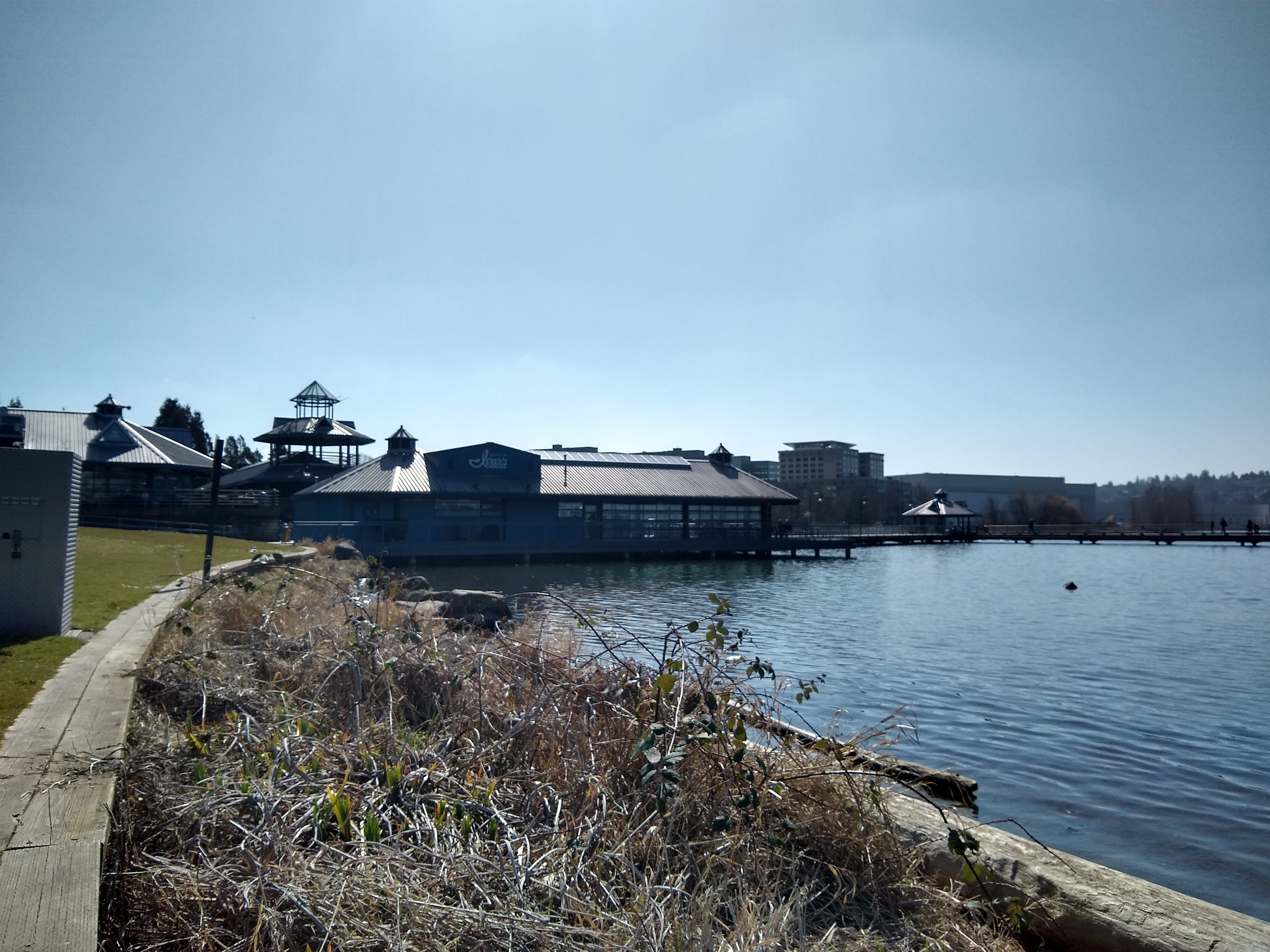
View of the Restaurant pavilion (center) and the Renton Boeing plant (far right).

The park was designed by the Jones and Jones architect landscaping company. The design integrates industrial building aspects with turn-of-the-century waterfront architecture. Buildings are spaced in series of both formal and informal landscapes, separated by strong features such as avenues of trees and open meadows. Additionally, the design includes multiple levels and interviewing paths. The diversity of these features is meant to facilitate a wide range of land use for both small and large groups.

At the 1985 National Geographic Society award ceremony in Washington, D.C., the park won an award from the American Society of Landscape Architects. This award is given to works considered to be the finest in landscape architecture.

== Amenities ==
The Gene Coulon Beach Park offers park wide entertainment. Being known for the two mile walking path alongside the beach, their two popular restaurants Kidd Valley and Ivar's Seafood Bar come in a close second. In 2020, the Gene Coulon Beach's park was under construction to add new park equipment. The Beach Park includes an eight lane boat/canoe launch, four covered pavilions with built in barbecue's, swimming beach with an on-duty lifeguard, fishing dock, and volleyball, tennis, and horseshoe courts. Two restrooms occupancy the park on opposite ends. Dogs are NOT permitted in the park. (The closest dog park is 2.4 miles away with no grass and no shade.)
