= Brooksville Cemetery =

Historic cemetery in Hernando County, Florida, US

Coordinates: 28.54694°N 82.36843°W

- Interactive map of Brooksville Cemetery

Details
- Established: 1887
- Location: 1275 Olmes Road, Brooksville, Florida
- Size: 51.5 acres (20.8 ha)

Brooksville Cemetery is a historic graveyard in Brooksville, Florida. It was acquired by the City of Brooksville in April 1887 and was known as Chocochattee Cemetery. Originally 5 acres, it is now 51.5 acres, and is located at 1275 Olmes Road near the junction of State Road 50 and 50A. The oldest marker is for Jane Hope who died at age 30 in 1845. She was the wife of settler William Hope. Settlers killed by Seminole Indians. The cemetery includes 5,000 burial sites and includes both Confederate and Union veterans from the Civil war, veterans from the Spanish–American War, World Wars I and II veterans, Korean War veterans, Vietnam veterans and veterans from more recent conflicts.
