= Bud Shinpoch =

American politician

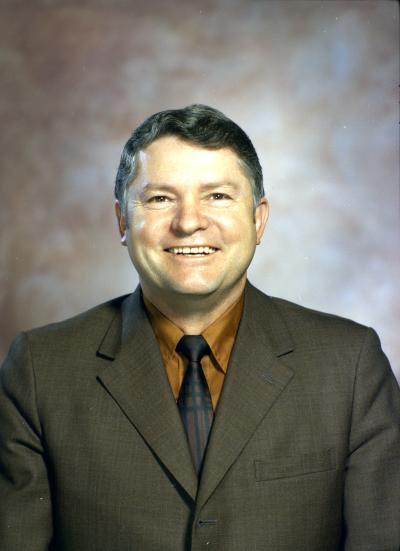
- Shinpoch in 1971

Member of the Washington House of Representatives
- In office 1969–1973 (47th district); 1973–1977 (11th district)

Member of the Washington State Senate for the 11th district
- In office 1977–1985

Personal details
- Born: Albert Neil Shinpoch; December 8, 1924 McIntosh County, Oklahoma, United States
- Died: October 16, 2001 (aged 76) Renton, Washington, United States
- Party: Democratic
- Spouse: Barbara Shinpoch
- Children: Jan and Terre

Albert Neil Shinpoch (December 8, 1924 – October 16, 2001) was an American politician in the state of Washington. He served in the Washington House of Representatives from 1969 to 1977 in two districts, and the Senate from 1977 to 1985. Shinpoch served as the chair of the House Ways and Means Committee, and in the Senate served as a member of the Ways and Means Committee. During his tenure in the legislature, he was known for his comprehensive knowledge of the state budget and his skill as a budget analyst.

Following his legislative career, Bud Shinpoch was named Director of Revenue in Gov. Booth Gardner's cabinet and later served as head of the Department of Social and Health Services.
