= List of the first women holders of political offices in South America =

This is a list of political offices which have been held by a woman, with details of the first woman holder of each office. It is ordered by the countries in South America and by dates of appointment. Please observe that this list is meant to contain only the first woman to hold of a political office, and not all the female holders of that office.

== Argentina ==
- President of a Major Political Party – Eva Perón – 1947
- First women in Congress – Twenty-two peronist women – 1951
- Vice President of the Chamber of Deputies – Delia Parodi – 1953
- Minister of the Supreme Court – Margarita Argúas – 1970
- Vice President of Argentina – Isabel Perón – 1973
- President of the Argentine Senate – Isabel Perón – 1973
- President of Argentina – Isabel Perón – 1974
- Foreign Minister (also first female Cabinet Minister) – Susana Ruiz Cerutti – 1989
- Provincial governor – Alicia Lemme – 2001 (of San Luis Province)
- Defense Minister – Nilda Garré – 2005
- Economy Minister – Felisa Miceli – 2005
- Elected President of Argentina – Cristina Fernández de Kirchner – December 10, 2007
- Elected provincial governor – Fabiana Ríos – December 10, 2007 (of Tierra del Fuego Province)

== Bolivia ==
- Member of Parliament – Emma Gutiérrez de Bedregal – 1956
- Minister of Labour and Health – Alcira Espinoza Schmidt de Villegas – 1969
- President (acting) – Lidia Gueiler Tejada – 1979
- Minister of Justice - Ana Maria Cortez de Soriano - 1997
- Interior minister – Alicia Muñoz Alá – 2006
- Minister of Planning and Environment – Gloria McPhee
- Defense Minister - María Cecilia Chacón - 2011

== Brazil ==
Empire of Brazil

- 1871: Senator – Isabel, Princess Imperial

Republic of the United States of Brazil:

- 1927: Elected Mayor (Lages) – Alzira Soriano
- 1933: Federal Deputy – Carlota Pereira de Queirós

United States of Brazil

- 1958: Elected Mayor (Quixeramobim) – Aldamira Guedes Fernandes
- 1962: Secretary of Social Service – Sandra Martins Cavalcanti de Albuquerque

Federative Republic of Brazil

=== National level ===
- 1979: Senator of the Republic (Amazonas) – Eunice Michilles
- 1982: Cabinet minister - Minister of Education – Esther Figueiredo Ferraz
- 1986: State Governor (Acre) – Iolanda Fleming
- 1990: Elected Senators – Júnia Marise (Minas Gerais) and Marluce Pinto (Roraima)
- 1995: Elected Governor (Maranhão) – Roseana Sarney
- 2011: President – Dilma Rousseff

=== Individual ministries ===
- 1989: Minister of Labour – Dorothea Werneck
- 1990: Minister of Economy – Zélia Cardoso de Melo
- 1993: Minister of Planning – Yeda Crusius
- 1993: Minister of Transportation – Margarida Coimbra do Nascimento
- 1995: Minister of Industry, Commerce and Tourism – Dorothea Werneck
- 2002: Minister of National Integration – Mary Dayse Kynzo
- 2003: Minister of Natural Environment – Marina Silva
- 2003: Secretary for Women's Rights – Emília Fernandes
- 2003: Secretary for Promotion of Racial Equality – Matilde Ribeiro
- 2003: Minister of Energy – Dilma Rousseff
- 2005: Chief of Staff – Dilma Rousseff
- 2007: Minister of Tourism – Marta Suplicy
- 2010: Minister of Social Development and Hunger Alleviation – Márcia Lopes
- 2011: Minister of Culture – Ana de Hollanda
- 2011: Minister of Fishing and Aquaculture – Ideli Salvatti
- 2011: Secretary for Human Rights – Maria do Rosário
- 2011: Secretary for Social Communication – Helena Chagas

== Chile ==
- Mayor – Emilia Werner – 1927
  - Mayor of Ránquil – Emilia Werner – 1927
  - Mayor of Providencia – Alicia Cañas – 1935
  - Mayor of Santiago – Graciela Contreras – January 6, 1939
  - Mayor of Pichilemu – Olga Maturana Espinosa – 1952
  - Mayor of Concepción – Ester Roa – 1958
  - Mayor of Las Condes – Silvia Boza – 1968
- Governor – Olga Boettcher – March 12, 1941
  - Governor of La Unión Department – Olga Boettcher – March 12, 1941
  - Governor of Tamarugal Province – Gabriela Hip – October 8, 2007
- Intendant – Inés Enríquez – 1950
  - Intendant of Concepción – Inés Enríquez – 1950
  - Intendant of the Santiago Metropolitan Region – Ximena Rincón – January 25, 2005
- Congresswoman – Inés Enríquez – 1951
  - Congresswoman for Concepción – Inés Enríquez – 1951
- Minister – Adriana Olguín de Baltra – 1952
  - Minister of Justice – Adriana Olguín de Baltra – 1952
  - Minister of Education – María Teresa del Canto – 1952
  - Minister of Labour and Social Welfare – Mireya Baltra – 1972-1973
  - Minister of National Resources (Ministra de Bienes Nacionales) – Adriana Delpiano – March 11, 1994
  - Minister of Foreign Relations – Soledad Alvear – March 11, 2000
  - Minister of Health – Michelle Bachelet – March 11, 2000
  - Minister of Planning and Cooperation (MIDEPLAN) – Alejandra Krauss – January 7, 2002
  - Minister of Defense – Michelle Bachelet – March 11, 2002
  - Minister of Housing, Urban Development and National Goods – Sonia Tschorne – September 29, 2004
  - Minister Secretary-General of the Presidency – Paulina Veloso – March 11, 2006
  - Minister of Economy, Development and Reconstruction – Ingrid Antonijevic – March 11, 2006
  - Minister of Mining and Energy – Karen Poniachik – March 11, 2006
  - Minister President of the National Council of Culture and the Arts – Paulina Urrutia – March 11, 2006
  - Minister General Secretary of Government – Carolina Tohá – March 11, 2009
  - Ministry of Public Works – Loreto Silva – 2012
  - Minister of Transport and Telecommunications – Paola Tapia – March 14, 2017
- Senator – María de la Cruz – February 13, 1953
  - Senator (Santiago) – María de la Cruz – February 13, 1953
- Minister (Note: Regular member of the Supreme Court, not its head.) of the Supreme Court Justice – María Antonia Morales – November 5, 2001
- President of the Christian Democrat Party (PDC) - Soledad Alvear - 2006
- President of the Chamber of Deputies – Adriana Muñoz – March 11, 2002
- President of Chile – Michelle Bachelet – March 11, 2006
- President of the Senate – Isabel Allende – March 11, 2014
- President of the Supreme Court – Gloria Ana Chevesich – January 6, 2026

== Colombia ==
- Secretary of Social Assistance of the Presidency – María Eugenia Rojas de Moreno – 1954
- Governor of Cauca (first governor, nominated by President) – Josefina Valencia de Hubach – 1955
- Minister of Education (first cabinet post) – Josefina Valencia de Hubach – 1956
- Senator – Esmeralda Arboleda – 1958
- Presidential candidate – María Eugenia Rojas – 1974
- Minister of Justice - Mónica de Greiff - 1989
- Minister of Foreign Affairs – Noemí Sanín – 1991
- Governor of Quindío (first governor elected) – Belén Sánchez – 1992
- Minister with Presidential functions – María Emma Mejía – 1998
- President of the Chamber of Representatives – Nancy Patricia Gutiérrez – 1999
- Minister of Defense – Marta Lucía Ramírez – August 2002
- President of the Senate – Claudia Blum de Barbieri – July 2005
- General (National Police) - Luz Marina Bustos - 2009
- Attorney General of Colombia – Viviane Morales – 2011
- Vice President of Colombia – Marta Lucía Ramírez – 2018
- Superior Mayor of Bogotá – Claudia López – 2020

== Ecuador ==
- Minister of Interior – Nela Martínez – 1944
- Minister of Social Affairs – Margarita Cedeños de Armijos – 1979
- President (acting) – Rosalía Arteaga – 1997
- Foreign minister – Nina Pacari Vega – 2003
- Defence minister – Guadalupe Larriva González – 2007
- Minister of Justice - Ledy Zúñiga Rocha - 2014

== Falkland Islands ==
- Elected Member of the Legislative Council (for East Falkland)– Marjorie Vinson – 1964
- Governor – Alison Blake – 2022

== Guyana ==
- Deputy Speaker of the National Assembly of Guyana – Janet Jagan – 1953
- President – Janet Jagan – 1997
- Prime Minister – Janet Jagan – 1997
- Minister of Foreign Affairs – Carolyn Rodrigues – 2008

== Paraguay ==
- Member of the Supreme Court – Serafina Dávalos – 1908
- Minister of Health and Social Affairs – Maria Cynthia Prieto Conti de Alegre – 1989
- Minister of Foreign Affairs – Leila Rachid de Cowles – 2003
- Minister of Public Health and Social Welfare – Esperanza Martínez (politician) – 2008
- Minister of Education and Culture – Blanca Ovelar – 2003
- Presidential Candidate – Blanca Ovelar – 2008
- Minister of Indigenous Affairs – Margarita Mbywangi – 2008
- Minister of Women – Gloria Rubin – 2012
- Minister of Justice and Labor – Sheila Abed – 2013

== Peru ==
- Senator of the Republic – Irene Silva de Santolalla – 1956
- Deputy of the Republic – Matilde Pérez Palacio – 1956
- Mayor of Lima – Anita Fernandini de Naranjo – 1963
- Minister of Education – Mercedes Cabanillas – 1987 (first woman ever in the Council of Ministers)
- President of Congress – Martha Chávez – 1995
- Prime Minister – Beatriz Merino – 2003
- Minister of Health – Pilar Mazzetti – 2004
- Ombudswoman of the Republic – Beatriz Merino – 2005
- Minister of Interior – Pilar Mazzetti – 2006
- Minister of Justice and Human Rights of Peru - María Bockos Heredia de Grillo -1989
- Minister of Foreign Commerce and Tourism – Mercedes Aráoz – 2006
- Minister of Transportation and Communications – Verónica Zavala – 2006
- Minister of Work and Employment – Susana Pinilla – 2006
- Vice President – Lourdes Mendoza – 2006
- Minister of Foreign Affairs – Eda Rivas – 2013
- President – Dina Boluarte – 2022

== Suriname ==
- Minister of Social Affairs and Housing – Siegmien Staphorst – 1980
- Minister of Justice and Police - Yvonne Raveles-Resida - 1999
- Foreign minister – Marie Levens – 2000

== Uruguay ==
Legislative Power

- Deputies – Julia Arévalo de Roche, Magdalena Antonelli Moreno – 1943
- Senators – Sofía Álvarez Vignoli, Isabel Pinto de Vidal – 1943
- Cabinet member - Alba Roballo - 1968
- Member of the Board of the National Party and Minister of Labor and Social Welfare - Ana Lía Piñeyrúa - 1995
- Speaker of the Chamber of Deputies – Nora Castro – 2005
- Vice President – Lucía Topolansky – 15 February 2010 / Beatriz Argimón – 1 March 2020
- Acting President of the Republic – Lucía Topolansky – 26–28 November 2010

Municipal

- Member of municipal council – Alba Roballo – 1955
- Intendant of Montevideo – Ana Olivera – 2010
- Intendant of Artigas – Patricia Ayala – 2010
- Intendant of Lavalleja – Adriana Peña – 2010
- Intendant of San José – Ana María Bentaberri – 2020

National Government

- Minister of Culture – Alba Roballo – 1968
- Ministry of Labour and Social Welfare – Ana Lía Piñeyrúa – 1995
- Ministry of Housing, Territorial Planning and Environment – Beatriz Martínez – 1999
- Minister of Industry, Energy and Mining – Primavera Garbarino – 2000
- Minister of National Defense – Azucena Berrutti – 2005
- Minister of Public Health – María Julia Muñoz – 2005
- Minister of Social Development – Marina Arismendi – 2005
- Minister of the Interior – Daisy Tourné – 2007
- Minister of Tourism – Liliam Kechichián – 2012
- Minister of Economy and Finance – Azucena Arbeleche – 2020
- Minister of Transport and Public Works – Lucía Etcheverry – 2025

Judiciary

- Member of the Supreme Court (Dictatorial period)– Sara Fons de Genta – 1981
- Member of the Supreme Court (Post-Democracy)- Jacinta Balbela – 1985

== Venezuela ==
- Constituent Assembly representative – Mercedes Carvajal de Arocha – 1947
- Senator – Mercedes Carvajal de Arocha – 1948
- Minister of Development – Aura Celina Casanova – 1969
- Presidential candidate – Ismenia Villalba – 1988
- Mayor of Chacao – Irene Sáez – 1992
- Governor – Lolita Aniyar de Castro – 1993
- Governor of Zulia – Lolita Aniyar de Castro – 1993
- President of the Chamber of Deputies – Ixora Rojas Paz – 1998
- Vice President – Adina Bastidas – 2002
- President of the National Assembly – Cilia Flores – 2006
- Minister of the Prison Service - Iris Varela - 2011
- Minister of Defense - Carmen Meléndez - 2013
- Foreign minister – Delcy Rodríguez – 2014

== See also ==
- List of elected and appointed female heads of state
- List of elected or appointed female heads of government
- List of the first LGBT holders of political offices
- List of the first women holders of political offices in North and Central America and the Caribbean
