= Alba Roballo =

Uruguayan politician

- Roballo, circa 1970
- Born: Alba Rosa Roballo Berón; 4 August 1908; Isla Cabellos, Artigas Department, Uruguay
- Died: 3 September 1996 (aged 88); Montevideo
- Occupations: lawyer, writer, politician
- Years active: 1939–1993

Alba Roballo (4 August 1908 – 3 September 1996) was an Uruguayan lawyer, poet, and politician, who served three consecutive terms from 1958 to 1971 in the Senate of Uruguay and a fourth term in the early 1990s. After graduating with a law degree from the Universidad de la República in Montevideo, she began to write. In 1942, her first book, Se levanta el sol (The Sun Rises), won first prize from the Ministry of Education. Later she founded two journals, Mujer Batllista (Batllist Woman) and El Pregón (The Town Crier). In 1954 she became the first woman to sit on the Montevideo Departmental Council and was elected Senator for the Colorado Party. A prominent Afro-Uruguayan, she was the first woman in South America to serve as a cabinet minister, appointed in 1968; she resigned this post following authoritarian actions by the government. She was a founder of the Frente Amplio in 1971 and though she ran for re-election, that year she was defeated.

After the 1973 Uruguayan coup d'état, Roballo became the target of numerous raids by the authorities for her outspokenness against the military regime which ran the country until 1984. When the dictatorship ended, she unsuccessfully ran for a Senate seat. She continued to serve on the directorate of the Frente Amplio, introducing legislation projects for social improvement through 1993, when she briefly served in the Senate again. Roballo died in 1996, but has been remembered by many memorials throughout the country including stamps issued in her likeness, streets and colonies named after her, as well as plazas and cultural centers.

== Early life and education ==
Alba Rosa Roballo Berón was born on 4 August 1908 (Note: Palermo gives her date of birth as 4 June 1909, but this appears incorrect as her birth was indexed in Uruguay in 1908.) in Isla Cabellos, Artigas Department, Uruguay, to Rosa Berón and Américo Roballo. Her father was the town commissioner and her mother, a teacher, operated the Escuela Rural Nº 8 (Rural School Nº 8) out of their home. From birth, Roballo accompanied her mother to her work in the school, as did her seven siblings. Her maternal great-grandfather was Genaro Berón de Astrada, one-time governor of Corrientes Province in northern Argentina, while her father was Uruguayan of mixed heritage, which included native Charrúa and African ancestry.

During her childhood, the family moved to Salto, Artigas, and Palma Sola, where her mother had various teaching jobs and Roballo completed her primary education. An avid reader, from a young age she was a keen observer of the conditions affecting the people living around her and began to speak about alleviating poverty. She completed her secondary schooling at the Liceo No. 1 in Artigas and then furthered her education at the University of the Republic. She studied teaching, earned a degree in philosophy, and began her career teaching at the school her mother operated on Dr. Pablo de María Street in Montevideo. Continuing her education, Roballo enrolled in the male-dominated law school at the university. While still studying, she married Walter Previtali with whom she had a son, Sergio Previtali. She joined the Federación de Estudiantes de la Universidad de Derecho (Student Federation of the University of Law) and was active in anti-fascist demonstrations in support of the Republicans in the Spanish Civil War.

When in 1933, Gabriel Terra orchestrated a coup d'état, Roballo participated in the occupation of the university in protest against the dictator. She joined the Colorado Party, led by Julio César Grauert and Baltasar Brum. When Brum committed suicide over the coup, Roballo delivered a funeral oration defending democracy to the large crowd which had gathered. As the only woman participant, she joined the Agrupación Avanzar (Avanzar Group), a faction of the Colorado Party led by Grauert, which was staunchly anti-imperialist and socially progressive. As she was married, she was able to agitate in clubs and meeting places where other women would have been forbidden entry. During this period, she met many socialists and was exposed to the ideas of Karl Marx and Friedrich Engels. She identified as a Batllist, but her husband was a communist. In 1939, Roballo earned a law degree.

== Career ==
=== Writing (1940–1992) ===
Roballo founded the magazine Mujer Batllista (Batllist Woman) in the early 1940s, which she used to put forward her political ideas. She published her first book of poems, Se levanta el sol (The Sun Rises), in 1942, which was honored by the Ministry of Public Instruction with first prize in the literary competition that year. Her written works, which were both prose and poetry, reflected her vigorous and rebellious spirit. In an "agonist" style, they explored her anxiety, pain, and fatigue with social conditions but also her deep love for her homeland. The themes in Roballo's written works echoed her public commitment to provide empathy, comfort, and motivation, but exposed the struggle and anguish that accompany sensitivity to the social environment and the challenges of life. For example, Tiempo de lobos (Time of Wolves, 1970) evaluates the climate of terror and suffering which occurred during the dictatorship. Her works were introduced abroad by Pablo Neruda, the Chilean poet and diplomat; Alfonso Reyes, the Mexican writer and philosopher; and César Tiempo, an Argentine screenwriter. She also founded the weekly journal, El Pregón (The Proclamation), which became the mouthpiece for her political movement of the same name. Her literary output spanned her career, with her final publication, La casa del humo (The House of Smoke), in 1992.

=== Political career (1947–1971) ===
Roballo became chair of the Cajas de Asignaciones Familiares, Vicente (Family Allowance Fund, Vicente) in 1947. Family Allowance Funds were established in Uruguay in 1943 to improve worker earnings and provide financial compensation to workers' families, especially those with children, who were experiencing hardship. From 1951 to 1954, she served as the vice president of the Caja de Jubilaciones (Pension Fund). In 1954, Roballo ran for a seat in the Chamber of Deputies, but when she was defeated by only a small margin, President Luis Batlle appointed her to chair the Caja Rural (Rural Fund), which oversaw the distribution of pensions in the countryside.

At the same time, in 1954, she was elected as vice president of the Concejo Departamental de Montevideo (Montevideo Departmental Council), marking the first time a woman had served on the council and been involved in the leadership of the city government. Roballo was dedicated to helping the most deprived and marginalized people in the country and often could be found at the Municipal Palace helping the cleaning staff after hours. She was also responsible for pushing for importation of the polio vaccine, which was successful in eradicating the disease in the capital. She served on the Municipal Council until 1959, and was known for introducing a plan to officially recognize the Desfile de llamadas (Calls Parade) at the opening of Carnival, establishing funeral services for the city's poor, and organizing the directorate of social services. She also organized many public works projects including paving roads, building tunnels and creating the first master plan for the development of the city.

Roballo was elected Senator in 1958, as the only woman serving at that time in the General Assembly. She was re-elected in 1962 and 1966. During her time in the Senate, she championed legislation directed at improving the lives of the poor and women. In the 1958 session, she authored Law No. 12.572, commonly known as the Ley Madre (Mother's Law) which granted paid leave for six weeks before and six weeks after pregnancy for working women or a state salary for women who were unemployed during their gestation period. The law was a landmark protection for women's rights. She also worked on legislation to recognize unmarried partnerships, and measures to provide equal opportunities and limit exploitation of workers.

In 1968, Roballo was selected by President Jorge Pacheco as the Minister of Education and Culture. With her appointment, she became the first woman to serve as a cabinet minister in Uruguay, as well as in South America. She had deep differences with Pacheco's administration, and after holding office from 3 May to 13 June, Roballo resigned her cabinet seat but not her position as a Senator on the day that Pacheco enacted emergency executive powers. He closed down parts of the press, censoring content for newspapers. He instituted emergency rules to arrest the leaders of trade unions and suppressed left-wing political groups, prohibiting public gatherings and expanding the authority of the police to intervene. On 14 August 1968 student demonstrators, including Líber Arce, Hugo de los Santos, and Susana Pintos were murdered by police. That day, Roballo decided to leave the Colorado Party and form her own political group, the Movimiento Pregón.

In the run-up to the 1971 election, Roballo united with Zelmar Michelini, a former member of the Colorado Party, and other leftist party members to form the new Frente Amplio (Broad Front) coalition. Though she had quit the Colorado Party, Roballo continued to follow Batllist ideology throughout her career. She claimed that she had to leave the party to save Batllism, bringing its tenets to the Frente Amplio. Among the founding members of Frente Amplio that year, candidates who had earlier been Batllists included Michelini, Roballo, Enrique Martínez Moreno, and Enrique Rodríguez Fabregat for the Senate; and Hugo Batalla and Sergio Previtali, Roballo's son, for Deputies. Despite standing for re-election, Roballo was not returned to the Senate in 1971, (Note: Both historian George Reid Andrews and writer Eduardo R. Palermo stated that Roballo retained her Senate seat in 1971, serving until the coup d'état in 1973. The hommage presented by Óscar Groba to the Uruguayan legislature in 2018 states "En las elecciones de noviembre de 1971, la Lista 9988 sacó 31.000 votos, de los cuales 18.000 eran de Montevideo; no era la votación esperada. Michelini conservó su escaño, pero Roballo no salió reelecta..." [In the elections of November 1971, the List 9988 (Broad Front) obtained 31,000 votes, of which 18,000 were from Montevideo; it was not the expected vote. Michelini retained his seat, but Roballo was not re-elected..."]. Uruguayan historian, Julio Lista Clericetti, confirms in his work Historia Politica Uruguaya 1938–1972, "Para las elecciones dei 71...Alba Roballo también adhirió a este sector...al Frente, lo que le acarreó la pérdida de su banca en el Senado." ["For the elections of 71...Alba Roballo also joined this sector...the Front, which led to the loss of her seat in the Senate".]) though the Frente Amplio unexpectedly succeeded with five Senators and 18 deputies winning seats in the coalition's first election.

=== Later career (1973–1993) ===
After the 1973 coup d'état, Roballo suffered persecution for her outspokenness against the military. Her home was raided several times during the 12-year dictatorship. In her early career, Roballo rarely acknowledged her African heritage, though she often was accompanied at rallies by Candombe drummers. Like other Afro-Uruguayans, she was referred to by the color of her skin and called La Negra Roballo, which she deemed pejorative. As she aged, Roballo began to be more open about her heritage and the discrimination she had faced as a woman, a black, and a left-leaning politician. In describing herself, she said "Yo era la negra que le gustaba el vino, la que tenía costumbres difíciles y se juntaba con los negros del barrio Sur". (I was the black woman who liked wine, the one with difficult customs, and who met with blacks in the South Quarter.)

After perestroika policies were implemented to reform the Communist Party of the Soviet Union, Roballo traveled to the USSR. Though skeptical that the country would be able to change, she concluded after her trip that because the Russians both revered their past but were critical of it, that they would succeed in merging their socialist past with a more global approach. When the dictatorship ended in 1984, Roballo again ran for the Senate as a candidate of the Izquierda Democrática Independiente (Independent Democratic Left) party, which was part of the Frente Amplio, but was defeated. She was able to continue her influence as part of the board of directors of the Frente Amplio through the early 1990s. Running in 1989, she was elected as an alternate senator for the Democracia Avanzada (Advanced Democracy) party. She returned to the Senate in 1993, serving for one last year.

== Death and legacy ==
Roballo died on 3 September 1996 in Montevideo. In tribute to her memory, one of the rooms in the Legislative Palace was named after her. In 2002, a commemoration was held in the Departmental Board of Montevideo which included eulogies by a number of board members, including Bertha Sanseverino. For International Women's Day 2010, she was honored in the Uruguayan postage stamp series Mujeres notables uruguayas (Notable Uruguayan Women). In 2012, a street in Artigas was named in her honor. A plaza in the Bella Italia neighborhood of Montevideo was named after her in 2015. In August 2019, Law 19781, which governs agrarian reforms, was modified to recognize that women had the right to acquire land and jointly hold title to it by renaming 16 colonies throughout the country after prominent women who had impacted development. In January 2010, Uruguay's Ministry of Education and Culture reopened a conference hall named in Roballo's Honor, recognizing her service as the country's first female cabinet minister. In 2020, a cultural center in the Nuevo París district of Montevideo was inaugurated in her name.

== Works ==
- Roballo, Alba (1942). Se levanta el sol [The Sun Rises] (in Spanish). Montevideo. OCLC 41147474.
- Roballo, Alba (1952). La tarde prodigiosa [The Prodigious Evening] (in Spanish). Montevideo: Prometeo. OCLC 1180290324.
- Roballo, Alba (1959). Canto a la tierra perdida [Song to the Lost Land] (in Spanish). Montevideo: Imprenta Libertad. OCLC 835486725.
- Roballo, Alba (1962). Mayo de cenizas [May of Ashes] (in Spanish). Montevideo.
- Roballo, Alba (1963). Réquiem para Miguel [Requiem for Miguel] (in Spanish). Montevideo.
- Roballo, Alba (1967). Poemas sin fecha [Undated Poems] (in Spanish). Montevideo: Alborada. OCLC 253551344.
- Roballo, Alba (1968). El libro de los adioses [The Book of Goodbyes] (in Spanish). Montevideo: Ediciones Avanzar. OCLC 1899896.
- Roballo, Alba (1969). Nunca adiós y relatos [Never Goodbye and Stories] (in Spanish). Montevideo.
- Roballo, Alba (1970). Relato y testimonio [Stories and Testimony] (in Spanish). Montevideo.
- Roballo, Alba (1970). Tiempo de lobos [Time of Wolves] (in Spanish). Montevideo: Sandino. OCLC 2419241.
- Roballo, Alba (1971). Poemas del miedo [Poems of Fear] (in Spanish). Montevideo: Bouzout. OCLC 978062393.
- Roballo, Alba (1981). Heredaras la tierra [Inherit the Earth] (in Spanish). Montevideo: Garcia. OCLC 252851724.
- Roballo, Alba (1984). La fábrica de la locura [The Factory of Madness] (in Spanish). Córdoba, Argentina: El Cid Editor. OCLC 18442083.
- Roballo, Alba (1988). Antología [Anthology] (in Spanish). Buenos Aires: Ediciones Libros de Tierra Firme. OCLC 253023048.
- Roballo, Alba (1992). La casa de humo [The House of Smoke] (in Spanish). Buenos Aires: Ediciones Libros de Tierra Firme. OCLC 912760877.
