= Alcira =

Alcira is a Spanish feminine given name. People with the name include:

- Alcira Argumedo (1940–2021), Argentine sociologist, academic, member of the Argentine Chamber of Deputies
- Alcira Cardona Torrico (1926–2003), Bolivian writer and poet
- Alcira Espinoza Schmidt de Villegas, Bolivian politician
- Alcira de la Peña (1910–1998), Argentine physician and political leader
- Alcira Soust Scaffo (1924–1997), Uruguayan teacher and poet

== Other uses ==
- Alzira, Valencia (Spanish: Alcira)
