= Torrico (surname) =

Torrico is a Spanish surname. Notable people with the surname include:

- Alberto Torrico (born 1969), American politician
- Didí Torrico (born 1988), Bolivian footballer
- Juan Crisóstomo Torrico (1808–1875) served as the 16th President of Peru
- Luis Torrico (born 1986), Bolivian footballer
- Sebastián Torrico (born 1980), Argentine former footballer
- Marcelo Torrico (born 1972), Bolivian former footballer
- Jair Torrico (born 1986), Bolivian footballer
- Rufino Torrico (1833—1920), Peruvian soldier and politician
- José Carrasco Torrico (1863–1921), Bolivian lawyer, journalist, and politician
- Alcira Cardona Torrico (1926–2003), Bolivian writer and poet

== See also ==
- Jirón Rufino Torrico, formerly known as Jirón Arica, is a major street in the Damero de Pizarro
