= Arroyo Yucutujá =

Stream in Artigas Department, Uruguay

Arroyo Yucutujá is a small water course running through Artigas Department, Uruguay. It belongs to the Río de la Plata drainage basin. It originates in the Cuchilla de Santa Rosa, near the sources of the Arroyo Ceballos Grande and Arroyo Patitas, a few kilometres east of the town of Baltasar Brum, Artigas. At Paso Tira Ponchos, the Arroyo Yucutujá Miní joins it on the left-hand side. It flows into the left bank of the Tres Cruces Grande stream.
