= Aldamira Guedes Fernandes =

Brazilian politician

Aldamira Guedes Fernandes (June 4, 1923 – March 16, 2013) was a Brazilian politician, former mayor of Quixeramobim, a municipality in the state of Ceará, which she governed from 1959 to 1963. She was the first woman to assume a mayoralty in Brazil elected by popular vote.

== Biography ==
She was born in Iguatu, a municipality located in the Center-South of Ceará, daughter of Alda Teixeira and Mário Gurgel Guedes. His older brother, Mário Teixeira Gurgel, became a religious of the Society of the Divine Savior and was bishop of the Diocese of Itabira-Fabriciano, in Minas Gerais. On her mother's side, she was the cousin of the lawyer and composer Humberto Teixeira. The name Aldamira refers to her mother and her paternal grandmother, Jesumira Gurgel Guedes, the youngest daughter of Major José Gurgel do Amaral Filho, patriarch of the Gurgel family in Ceará and Rio Grande do Norte.

She moved to Quixeramobim at the age of seventeen, after marrying the doctor Joaquim Fernandes, who was also mayor of the municipality.

In 1958, Aldamira ran for mayor of Quixeramobim for the Social Democratic Party, in opposition to Álvaro Araújo Carneiro, candidate for the National Democratic Union. Aldamira won the elections, held on October 12, with 58% of the vote, thus becoming the first Brazilian female mayor elected by direct vote. Before her, however, another woman had been elected mayor, Alzira Soriano, in the interior of Rio Grande do Norte, in 1928. Then another, Joana da Rocha Santos, in São João dos Patos, Maranhão, in 1934. Both, however, had been elected indirectly.

Aldamira served from March 25, 1959 to March 25, 1963. After that, she no longer held any political office.

In the 2010 elections, at the age of 87, although she was not obliged to do so due to age, Aldamira made a point of casting her vote for the first woman candidate for the Presidency of the Republic.

In January 2013, the former mayor was admitted to a private hospital in Fortaleza, Ceará, after fracturing her femur in a domestic accident. She underwent surgery and, after two months of hospitalization, when she was preparing to be discharged, she had a cardiac arrest and died at the age of 89, in the early hours of March 16. The body was then taken back to Quixeramobim, where it was laid to rest in the Municipal Palace. After the mass of the body present held in the Mother Church, he was buried in the Municipal Cemetery. The City Hall declared five days of official mourning.
