= Feliciano Viera =

Uruguayan politician (1872–1927)

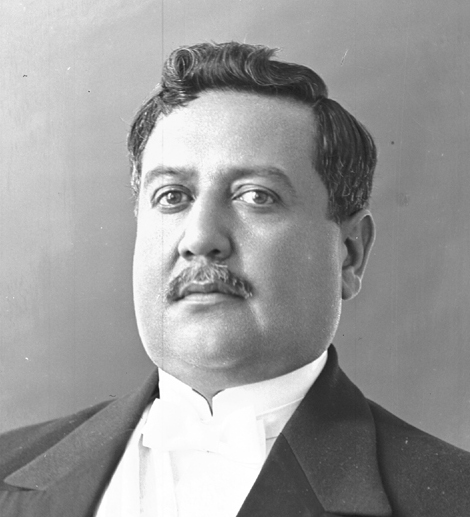

22nd President of Uruguay
- In office 1 March 1915 – 1 March 1919
- Preceded by: José Batlle y Ordóñez
- Succeeded by: Baltasar Brum

President of the National Council of Administration
- In office 1 March 1919 – 1 March 1921
- President: Baltasar Brum
- Preceded by: Office established
- Succeeded by: José Batlle y Ordóñez

Personal details
- Born: 8 November 1872 Salto, Uruguay
- Died: 13 November 1927 (aged 55) Salto, Uruguay
- Party: Colorado Party

Feliciano Alberto Viera Borges (8 November 1872 – 13 November 1927) was a Uruguayan political figure.

== Background ==
Viera was born in Salto, where he started his education at the Academy of Osimani and Llerena. When he was fifteen, he went to Montevideo and entered the university. His studies were interrupted by revolutionary outbreaks, which led his family to emigrate to Argentina. During the Presidency of Lieut.-General Tajes, Viera returned and renewed his studies. At the age of 21, he obtained his degree of Bachelor and in 1898 received his degree of Advocate after presenting a thesis on "La libertad de reunion." That same year Viera's political career started when he was appointed to a post in the Council of State, which was established by the then President Cuestas. Viera resigned from this position very soon after receiving it. Later that year, the Government nominated him Civil Governor and head of the Police in the Department of Artigas and in 1899 he was elected Deputy for El Salto. Viera was re-elected Deputy in 1901, and during his second term, as noted by one study, he took "a prominent position in furthering important measures afterwards converted into laws which met with the approval of the Press of all parties." At the start of the 1904 revolution, Viera was put under the charge of the 9th Battalion of the National Guard by President José Batlle y Ordóñez. In 1905 Viera was again elected Deputy for El Salto, and one year afterwards Senator for the Department of Rivera.

He was a member of the Colorado Party and closely identified with the liberal former president José Batlle y Ordóñez, who long dominated Uruguay's political life, being a Batllista before 1903. In the 1903 election, he contributed his vote to the election of Batlle, and was elected senator for Rivera. During Batlle's first term, Viera was also elected by the Chamber (along with 4 other stalwart Batllistas) to the Permanent Committee, which sat when the legislature wasn't in session. Also during Batlle's first presidential term, Viera helped make possible the passage of a taxation project. The executive proposed to increase the rural land taxes by some 110,000 pesos over the 1,192,313 pesos collected in 1902–1903, but the Chamber of Deputies, as noted by one study, "was reluctant to approve the increases for next year. Now was a bad time to raise assessments; ranchers were already fearful of war; drought and plagues had ravaged the interior; the government did not need more taxes." The project was saved by a compromise by Viera. Previously, the departmental administrations had received all rural land-tax collections which went beyond the amounts collected in 1898–1899; the central government only received the amount collected in that fiscal year. As noted by one study, "The Executive's project changed this: the basic property tax would remain at 6.50 pesos per 1,000 pesos of assessed value, of which the national government would receive 5.50 pesos and the administration of the department where the property was located 1 peso. Viera got the Executive to agree to a stipulation: if the 1 per 1,000 rate in a department did not produce as much total revenue as the departmental administration had received in fiscal 1902-1903 under the old system, the central government would reimburse the department for the difference. The Deputies, now that they had protected local government, reluctantly approved the increased rural land taxes."

Prior to becoming president, Viera was the campaign manager of Batlle's presidential successor Claudio Williman However, Williman vetoed Viera for a ministry, along with Domingo Arena (a close ally of Batlle's) for the Senate because, according to one study, "they were too Batllista and he wanted to keep up appearances." Viera did, however, serve in Batlle's second government as interior minister. This was, at that time, the most important cabinet post in the administration. Viera also served as the President of the Senate of Uruguay from 1907 to 1912.

== President of Uruguay ==
On one occasion, the Batllistas won all the Colorado seats, 68 seats in total (compared to 21 for the Blancos), ensuring Viera's election as president. He was, according to one study, "a Colorado of tradition and a committed batllista, a man of complete confidence of Don Pepe, who could be sure that if he became president, he would carry out the party's projects and objectives." Batlle himself spoke out and poured his influence in favour of Viera's presidential candidacy. This had been assured since 1913, as noted by one study, "by the proclamation of the National Commission of the Colorado Party and the formal commitment of seventy-two legislators of that same political affiliation. At the session of March 1, 1915, in which the election was to take place, the nationalists and some of the senators who were opposed to the formula of the Collegiate Executive Power abstained from attending. Dr. Viera was elected by the unanimous vote of the seventy-odd legislators present. "I promise to help you," he said when taking the oath, "to the realization of the Collegiate Executive Power; and I will fight so that the suffrage is increasingly purer." "

On July the 14th 1913, a Colorado convention nominated Viera as their candidate. Viera’s candidacy, as noted by one study, “was supported by the Batllista majority of the Colorado Party.” A letter was read out that had been written by Domingo Arena, a close Batlle ally who was recovering from an auto accident. In the letter, Arena noted that constitutional reform was being blocked by the Senate majority, while advocating Viera's nomination: "Therefore, I move that this assembly resolve to support the candidacy of doctor Feliciano Viera should the election of the Executive Power have to be carried out in accord with the present Constitution. If we want to guarantee the triumph of the Colegiado, it is essential that the future president not only be in favour of the Colegiado but that his character, rectitude, intelligence, and party loyalty be sufficient assurance that the decisions of the Convention will be complied with without vacillations of any sort, and doctor Viera offers all those guarantees."

There were, as noted by one study, cheers from the delegates and speeches, with one attendee, Francisco Simón, describing Viera as the man to continue Batlle's work, while also noting his popularity in the interior. That same day a "Youth Committee pro Viera" was formed, which dropped manifestos and Viera portraits from the balcony while Viera was being nominated by acclamation. In an interview with El Día, Viera noted his support for the Colegiado proposal. Pedro Manini Ríos, Batlle's political protégé, wrote positively of Viera, stating that

I had accustomed myself to see Batlle's natural successor in Viera and looked forward to it, because El Indio, as we call him familiarly, in spite of the prejudices against him, in spite of his negative qualities, is loyal, calm, honest, and straightforward as a statesman, and I am sure that should he occupy the presidency, he would surround himself with good ministers, to whom he would give great freedom of administrative action while he reserved politics for himself, something he would know how to do, directly, nobly, and with fairness."

One article from December 1913 commented on Viera's road to the presidency as such

The P.E. already counts, one year from now, on the certain success of its candidates in the next senatorial elections. He also expects that these candidates will vote for Dr. Feliciano Viera, President of the Republic. And finally, it counts on the fact that the presumed substitutes of the future candidates of the next senators will also vote on the 1st of March to the current Minister of the Interior. This is what the first magistrate makes known in the following lines: «That commitment—(the pro Viera)—currently has 72 signatures. To these They will add next year, that of the six senators who will make up the Senate, before March 1914.—or the respective substitutes,—whose elections are expected to fall on people affected by the candidate Dr. Feliciano Viera. There is no doubt that the "clarinada" of the 30th has reinvigorated the democratic spirit of the ruling party, allowing it to dispose of his desire for the senatorial offices as his own thing and. what is more surprising even, the will of the candidates to solve, nothing less, than the presidential problem. It is true that in the intervening time it is not possible to expect a radical change in the political program of the street sweepers and civil guards, and this is, without a doubt, the determining cause of the assurances that the P.E. has been harboring from now on about the success of the next elections.

According to one study, Batlle would have preferred José Serrato, and there were stories "that Batlle had once told intimates that Viera was not of Presidential quality" while insiders claimed that Viera had questionable friends, the sort that Batlle "made it a policy to keep from the public treasury." Batlle's brother Luis warned him in a 1908 letter that "Viera is a very good person, he couldn't be better, but he has the bad judgment to have very bad friends, and of those around him, except for Areco, there isn't one who is worth two cents."

Nevertheless, Viera went on to serve as President of Uruguay from 1915 to 1919. Among prominent figures who served in his administration was Baltasar Brum, who occupied the interior and subsequently the foreign affairs ministry. Brum's period of office as Foreign Minister proved to be somewhat controversial. In the autumn of 1917, American warships sailed to the Argentine capital Buenos Aires and a delegation issued threats to the country's President Hipólito Yrigoyen, in relation to the country's neutrality, which the United States insisted should be more clearly focused as being pro-American. Yrigoyen refused to be bowed by such threats from a military delegation, whereupon the American ships sailed to Montevideo, where they were warmly welcomed by Brum, in contrast to the guarded reception which the delegation had received in Buenos Aires. Brum later travelled to the United States and was received by the Secretary of State.

Uruguay was more closely identified with the Allied cause in World War I than was neighbouring Argentina, cutting diplomatic relations with the German Empire in late 1917. In 1916 the government of France bestowed upon Viera the Cross of the Legion of Honor, which he was allowed to wear by legislative enactment. In October 1917, Viera delivered a speech reaffirming Uruguay's sympathy with the Belgian cause and its solidarity with (as noted by one journal) "the countries which are fighting for the cause of justice and right." In January 1918 Viera sent a New Year's greeting to the U.S., proclaiming that "Bound, as it is, to my country by the triple bond of a similar republican ideal, by harmonious aspiration for international justice and an equal desire for extended and fraternal Pan-Americanism, both had to meet on the same side in this definite struggle for liberty." Viera was also the victim of an assassination attempt during a riot following a general strike in August 1918, with a bullet narrowly missing Viera as he stood on a balcony.

In various pronouncements, Viera indicated that he would continue the reform program of his predecessor Batlle. In a 1915 speech addressed to deputies and senators during his first year as president, stated that "I will especially ask Your Honour for the sanction of laws that you are already studying, some that ensure and improve the situation of the worker and others that prevent conflicts between capital and the proletariat whose harmony we must seek as fertile sources of peace and progress. Thus, I will ask you to enact laws on workplace accidents, women's and children's work, working hours, old-age pension, child protection, labor legislation, minimum wage, weekly rest and others." 2 years earlier, on July the 16th 1913, El Día published a pronouncement by Viera in which he declared that

If I have any reason for desiring the Presidency of the Republic it would be to have the honor of being the continuer of the democratic and very advanced accomplishments of President Batlle....His enormous activity has launched the nation on new and vast paths. His is the honor of having initiated that great set of liberal laws which have made our country, in social legislation for example, among the most advanced in America.... The evolutions suffered by the Colorado Party have made it virtually unnecessary for other modern groups to exist in our country. That is the case with Socialism, for example. The Colorado Party has the advantage over Socialism that it is in a position to carry out with practical efficiency the humanitarian principles which are nothing more than generous but platonic utopias in the latter. I believe this, too, is due to Batlle's influence...."

Viera has, however, been described as more conservative than Batlle. This was arguably demonstrated in 1916 when Viera indicated, according to one study, that "he disapproved of the enthusiasm for experiment and reform." This occurred following the introduction of a constitutional reform proposal, in which the first election conducted by secret ballot was held, which saw Battlism lose. Upon hearing the results, Viera stated, "Well, gentlemen, we won't advance any more in the area of social and economic legislation; we should reconcile capital with labor. We have moved too quickly; we must pause in the task. We should not sponsor new laws of this type and even paralyze those that are being considered in the legislature."

According to his finance minister M.C. Martinez, as noted by one study, "The president feels that it is necessary to call a halt because the machine has been going too fast," but "It does not mean that progressive initiative will be abandoned by the State – except when it enervates private initiative (the essential to national greatness) or disturbs our credit. Nor does it mean giving capital privileges over labour." Indeed, a number of reforms were carried out during Viera's presidency. A law enacted at the end of 1915 established that the effective work of workers in various establishments such as shipyards and factories "could not last more than eight hours." The average term of daily work could be increased, but on condition "that it never exceed the legal maximum of 48 hours for every six days of work," while "No factory, company or house could use workers who worked in another establishment during the maximum hours authorized by law." A 1918 law prohibited night work in various food-making establishments such as bakeries, with fines in cases of infractions and recidivism. A Board of Criminals and Minors was also established.

In terms of social welfare, the Derecho a la Vida (Right to Life), which sought to provide needy persons with shelter and food, prescribed "the supply of food to the inhabitants of the country, when they lack means of subsistence, etc." The law of July the 12th 1916 provided "that food be provided in the Police Stations, Barracks or appropriate premises, to all the inhabitants of the country who are without work and who lack means of subsistence." A law was also enacted in which children "under two years of age given to wet nurses outside the parents' home were placed under the surveillance of the State, in order to ensure their life and health; those entrusted to caregivers outside the parents' home to be artificially fed; those of mothers placed as wet-nurses or who had received other children at their homes to breastfeed them. Public Assistance was entrusted with the direction of the service." In addition, emergency services were improved in 1918 "by a new regulation of first aid on public roads, at home and in any other place where it was needed." A law of February the 26th, 1919 authorized the government "to contract for important sanitation work in 15 cities." A 1919 law established minimum annual pensions; partially aimed at helping those who were indigent and disabled. Under this law, which was dated 11 February 1919, the age qualification was set at 60 while invalids could qualify at any age, although the law carefully required total incapacity. In addition, Article V provided that money should be set aside "as reserve against variations in income and for use in building old-folks' homes." By this law, according to one study, "the State recognized its responsibility to provide a minimum of subsistence for the indigent aged and totally incapacitated." A budgetary law related to public assistance that was introduced in February 1919 provided that doctors who became unemployed as a result of the approval of this budget (provided they had at least ten years of service) would be entitled to a 40% bonus retirement, as long as this benefit did not exceed their current salary.

A presidential message from 1916 also noted various developments that had taken place in Public Assistance. For instance, the Maternity Pavilion and shelter for pregnant women were inaugurated, "which includes the solution of the problem of defense and protection of helpless mothers, abandoned or temporarily unable to attend to their care and subsistence." Some improvements were implemented in other Assistance services, including "acquisition of land adjoining the Eermín Ferreira Hospital, repairs in some rooms of the Maciel Hospital and of surgical instruments for the same, repairs in one of the pavilions of the Pereira Rosell Hospital, increase in the rolling stock of the Permanent Medical Service, increase in the technical administration staff, etc. of the aforementioned service, the works of the Gynecology Pavilion, for which the amount of $109,437.55 has been paid, repairs to the "Doecker" pavilions of the Asilo Luis Piñeyro del Campo, etc." Improvements were also made in field establishments, such as "the construction of four pavilions in the Santa Lucía Colony - Insane Asylum, which will allow 300 inmates to be taken out of Vilardebó Hospital, thus alleviating, in part, the state of overcrowding in that said hospital is located; the works and acquisitions that have enabled the Galán y Rocha Nursing Home Hospital in Paysandú; the acquisition of land adjacent to the San José Hospital for its expansion, repairs to the buildings occupied by the El Salto Children's Asylum and the Artigas and Plores hospitals." Also, as noted in the same message, "The movement in the internal services, external, emergency, home and home protection childhood during the year 1915 shows a notable increase compared to previous years, as logical sequence of the implementation of new services and the expansion and improvement of existing ones."

In 1916, the Assembly resolved to declare a national holiday on May the 1st as a labor holiday. Decrees of 25 June 1915 made specific provision "for the safety of railway employees and those engaged in factories, mines and quarries using explosive substances." In addition, a decree of 15 November 1918 provided specific regulation of working conditions in the mines. In 1916, The Executive Power requested and obtained the establishment of two secondary schools in Montevideo, while another law accorded high school students who had completed the four years of the secondary school curriculum "the right to enter the Schools of Comercio, Agronomy and Veterinary Medicine and in secondary education courses." A law of 1916 abolished tuition and examination fees for regulated secondary school students, while authorizing the Executive Branch "to extend the franchise to all regulated or free students, once the state of finances permitted it." In 1918 the first law for the safeguarding of employed women and children was adopted, which required the provision of seats for such workers. That same year the Executive Power was authorized "to build municipal laundries in all the cities of the coastal and interior departments."

By resolution of the Executive Power, a project relative to the defence against syphilis, formulated by the President of the National Council of Hygiene, was approved, "according to which the Prophylactic Institute of Syphilis is created and the installation of several dispensaries is established where those who attend them are treated free of charge and medicines are provided. With the installation of these dispensaries, which are already fully operational, the task of defending against that disease, a social evil that tends to become more widespread every day, making its destructive action felt in the individual and their offspring." The premises of the Military Hospital were also one of the improvements, among which included "the inauguration of a pavilion destined to shelter patients subjected to Military Justice." According to a presidential message from 1918, "The project of the Director of Public Assistance has begun to be executed, by which the number of polyclinics is increased, services that provide so much good to the needy classes, and that have the advantage of accustoming families to frequenting the doctor, distancing them of the healer, and allowing at the same time that diseases can be attacked in their first signs, giving notions of hygiene and general prophylaxis that, transmitted to the home, prevented the development of many diseases." Also, "In accordance with the aforementioned project, a surgical polyclinic was created at the Máciel Hospital, a medical-surgical polyclinic at each of the Gota de Leche Clinics, a medical polyclinic and another surgical polyclinic at the Luis Piñeyro del Campo Asylum, Hospital Fermín Ferreira and Vilardebó Hospital. For the same project, the city is divided into four large radios, and the sick must go to the service that corresponds to them according to their homes. In addition, a medical-surgical polyclinic for children was created at the Hospital del Salto." In addition, "the function of a Convalescent Colony has been studied in which, in accordance with the laws that govern the institution, men, women and children over 7 years of age will be assisted from Public Assistance establishments." For those in Primary Public Instruction, a hundred assistantships authorized by law of October 1917, "which will allow instructing four or five a thousand more children, at least."

In 1912, during Batlle's presidency, the shares of the National Mortgage Bank passed into the hands of the State. However, as noted by one study, "after the purchase of Banco Hipotecario by the State, in order for it to be able to grant housing loans, a modification of its Charter was necessary. This modification was made by Law No. 5343 of October 22, 1915, and thus the BHU, or in other words the State itself, became a lender for workers' housing. Article No. 63 of the aforementioned Law established the amounts and conditions of the loans for the construction of such housing." As noted by the Ministry of the Interior

The building loan shall not exceed half of the value of the land and 65 percent of the construction, when the land is located within the urban area of Montevideo, in avenues or streets of first order, or in the construction of houses or dwellings for workers, whose owners accept the conditions imposed by the Bank to build them, or of constructions whose value does not exceed $ 10,000 (ten thousand pesos) also within the urban area of Montevideo. Apart from these cases, the construction loan shall not exceed half the value of the land and the construction, within the urban plant of Montevideo; 40 percent of the same value in areas located outside the radius of Montevideo, and 30 percent of said value, in towns, villages and cities whose population exceeds five thousand inhabitants"[1] (Ministry of the Interior, 1916: 771).

A 1916 law declared "unseizable capital up to $5,000 and income up to $1,200 per year, in popular operations carried out by the State Insurance Bank." To help stevedores a central office was created by the Executive Power by decree of 15 April 1916 "which was to register all stevedores and assign them to work in turn." However, the eight-hour day and successive strikes "forced the office to enrol a larger number of men, with a consequent spreading of work so broadly that earnings declined." A law of 21 March 1918 authorized prenda agraria operations, which began in 1920. This credit "was a form of current account for the cattleman who could pay off the loan as he sold the property on which it was based; it was intended to prevent forced liquidation at ruinous prices when the market was heavily depressed." A law of 27 February 1919 established a postal savings system which offered the advantages "that deposits could not be attached, that women could deposit and withdraw without their husbands' knowledge, and that the service could be utilized in small communities where there was no branch of the Bank." Rules and regulations promulgated by the President of the Republic for the prevention of accidents to workmen prescribed, among other things, "that motors and dynamos used by industrial companies shall be inclosed by railings or bars, and persons not connected with the service are forbidden entry to such inclosures." Also, in the wood packing industry "workmen whose eyes may be injured by shavings, particles of dust, etc, are required to wear glasses. This rule also applies to workmen in foundries where there is danger of injury from sparks, sand, etc." A tuition-free School of Modelling, aimed at promoting the study of art and open to all who showed any skill on modelling and drawing, was established by the government. A presidential decree of January the 22nd, 1919 authorized the insurance of national realty in the State Securities Bank against fire. Under the same decree "automobiles, trucks, and other vehicles for motor transportation in the service of public works are also insured against all loss, risk, and liability for damages."

According to a presidential message from 1918, the National Inspection of Livestock and Agriculture "through the agronomic inspection services, chemical and seed laboratories, crops experimental, agronomic information, sections forestry and marks and signs of cattle, and other technical dependencies, has carried out a task as persistent as useful." The Agricultural Inspectors "dedicated themselves preferably to the extensive teaching of agriculture and livestock, through conferences, practical lessons, consultations, advice, publications, demonstrative experiences, incentive contests, etc., taking agricultural education to the rural workers themselves in a practical way that has translated into a real improvement in working conditions and an appreciable increase in production." As a complement to this work, the National Inspection published teaching works on the cultivation of flax, corn, fodder, potatoes, beet, etc., based, preferably, on studies and experimental works, all of which were distributed free of charge. In terms of industrial teaching, "With the intervention of the respective Council, the Executive Power authorized the creation of ten night industrial courses for workers and apprentices, of normal courses for the training of industrial education teachers, of three primary industrial schools, of a library and reading room, of an official journal of industrial education and the suppression of some unnecessary workshops, as well as the installation of new ones in the Industrial School number 1."

Viera's presidency was also marked by constitutional change, with one study noting that

During the first year of Dr. Viera's Presidency, the process of the three successive legislatures that were to intervene in the process of constitutional reform was completed, in accordance with the Constitution of 1830. The third Legislature, which was what was acting at that time, accepted one of the formulas sanctioned by his predecessor, through which the procedure to reform the Constitution was substantially modified. Instead of the three successive legislatures respectively in charge of declaring the need for the reform, of specifically pointing out the points of the reform and of approving or disapproving those points, it would be enough from now on for any one Legislature to declare the reform to be of national interest, so that in The act was to convene a great National Constituent Assembly empowered to plan, study and sanction what it itself considered necessary. At the end of 1915, the law on elections of the Constituent Assembly was issued.

In assessing his government's record, Viera argued that

During my administration as president ...... I made an effort to carry out the Colorado program, especially in its constitutional part, accepting for this purpose all that conjuration of passions provoked against us by the essential points of the reformist program: the multiple Executive and the separation of the Church and the State. We accept and contribute to the same degree to its success – many social laws. The Working Day, the Night Work, the Old Age Pensions, the Right to Life, all these problems of urgent solution, because the interest of the humble classes so required, were resolved during my government. Legislative action also tended to perfect our legislation on divorce, to improve the fate of natural children, to apply a more humane and scientific interest in the criminal solutions of our time, advocating in this regard that the conditional sentence be an institute of our legal organization.

== Post Presidency ==
In 1919, Viera relinquished the presidency and was succeeded by Baltasar Brum. He then became chairman of the National Council of Administration (prime minister), holding the post until 1921.

Although associated with Batlle early in his political career, Viera later broke with Batlle, forming his own Colorado faction, the Colorado Radical Party. As noted by one study, while serving as President of the Comisión Nacional Colorada, Batlle presented a controversial motion that triggered a new conflict and a new party split within Batllismo. The events were detailed in the newspaper El Día

Mr. Batlle y Ordóñez then left the presidency to deal with a motion he was going to present. He said more or less the following: "With the new constitutional regime customs must change. Before, all the party activities were developed around the President of the Republic (...) New institutions now change all this (...) The party house must be the center where all the representative men of the group to which they belong meet, talk and exchange ideas. All questions of public and partisan interest should be illustrated and deliberated in this place widely open to generous and patriotic inspirations". After having founded it, Mr. Batlle y Ordóñez read his motion.

Viera and the leaders who responded to his incipient leadership rejected Batlle's proposal, which had already been harshly contested by the new Vieristas within the Commission. Among their interventions was that of the renowned jurist Dr. Justino Jiménez de Aréchaga, who argued against the proposal, expressing the opinion that it "restricted the free action of the national government" and provoked "the distortion of the representative system". Batlle's proposal was rejected by the National Red Committee, where there was a majority of leaders close to Viera, who founded a newspaper ("La Defensa") and a new faction (the "Partido Colorado Radical"). Viera argued that

Up to this point we have agreed with Mr. Batlle. For the future we cannot say the same, because we do not know what Batlle wants, or where Batlle is going. It is possible that we will accept all of your ideas that fit within the Colorado program. But what is undoubtable is that we will not accompany him in an "outrance" advance. The Colorado Party is not socialist, nor does it go towards socialism. In my opinion, its mission, now more than ever, is to reconcile Capital with Work, without harassing either of these two factors, on whose agreement the national well-being depends. For the reasons expressed, the Colorado Party is divided. (...) We deny vierismo, me the first. From now on there will be batllistas and colorados.

Despite its opposition to Batlle, Viera's faction nevertheless presented itself as progressive and prolabor, while also describing itself as liberal. Also, while less successful electorally than the Batllistas, the Radical Colorado Party (also known as "Vierismo") managed to obtain a degree of political influence. As noted by one study

In the 1926 election Batlle y Ordóñez presented himself as a candidate for the presidency of the National Administration Council and won the victory, accompanied by the radical colorado Luis C. Caviglia (1874-1955). Caviglia (1874-1955), who had been Minister of Industry (1919-1922) and Minister of Finance (1924-1925). Arturo Lussich entered for the National Party. It should be noted that Batllismo considered the position of President of the Republic as that of "a policeman in dress uniform". And Batlle y Ordóñez himself pointed out that in the exercise of the Presidency he would get bored because his competences did not make the governmental progress. Independently of this, Batlle y Ordóñez pointed out that only in this distribution of positions (a riverista to the Presidency of the Republic and a radical accompanying him in the council) would allow the sure triumph of the Party. And so it happened. Of course, the radicalism had been practically evicted from all positions and the death of Viera turned it into a current on the way to extinction. But it maintained an essential electoral percentage for the triumph of the Colorado slogan.

As further noted by another study

Vierismo was always a minority in terms of vote flow, even smaller than Riverismo, but, at least until Terra's coup d'état in 1933, it constituted a strategic sector, very skillfully located in the structure of a public administration that grew day by day. . Some foreign researcher called Vierismo "an administrative party", alluding to the fact that in all sections of the public administration there was some Vierista occupying some leadership or important position, which made it a decisive factor, especially in the 1920s, when the Differences in votes between whites and reds were so small that a minimal loss or a minimal transfer in some section could decide the electoral victory. Feliciano Viera, personally, always held positions of hierarchy, especially in the National Council of Administration that would be created in the 1917 Constitution.

Future president Jorge Pacheco Areco was involved with Viera's Radical Party faction through his maternal grandfather, but a few years later approached his relatives Batlle Pacheco and joined the newspaper "El Día".

Viera died on 13 November 1927, aged 55.

== See also ==
- Politics of Uruguay

== Sources ==
- Parker, William Belmont (1921). Uruguayans of to-day. New York: Hispanic Society of America.

Political offices
Preceded by José Batlle y Ordóñez	President of Uruguay; 1915–1919	Succeeded by Baltasar Brum
Preceded by Office Established	Prime Minister of Uruguay; 1919–1921	Succeeded by José Batlle y Ordóñez
