= Baião Ca-Room' Pa Pa =

Portuguese-language song by Humberto Teixeira and Luiz Gonzaga

Song by Carmen Miranda
- Language: Portuguese
- Recorded: 1950
- Songwriter(s): Humberto Teixeira; Luiz Gonzaga
- Lyricist(s): Ray Gilbert (English)

"Baião Ca-Room' Pa Pa" is a song written by Humberto Teixeira and Luiz Gonzaga with an English version by Ray Gilbert, engraved by Carmen Miranda in 1950 and featured in the film Nancy Goes to Rio from MGM. It is a "Gay Latin lilt from Miranda's flicker" said Billboard magazine.
