= Luis Piñeyro del Campo =

Uruguayan lawyer, politician and philanthropist

Luis Piñeyro del Campo (Montevideo, 15 August 1853 - Paris, 21 August 1909) was a Uruguayan lawyer, politician and philanthropist.

== Biography ==
A member of the Constitutional Party, he served as foreign minister in the cabinet of Juan Idiarte Borda.

A practising Roman Catholic, all his life he contributed to important charities and public institutions dealing with sick people, orphans and poors.

The former Asilo de Mendigos was named in his honour as Hospital Luis Piñeyro del Campo.

== Works ==
Piñeyro was also a writer. His most notable work is:

- El último gaucho. Montevideo: Imprenta Artística. 1891.

== Bibliography ==
- Piñeyro Gutiérrez, Alberto (2009). Luis Piñeyro del Campo. Caridad y dignidad. Montevideo: Artemisa Editores. ISBN 978-9974-8124-9-9.
