= Iguatu Airport =

Dr. Francisco Tomé da Frota Airport Aeroporto Dr. Francisco Tomé da Frota
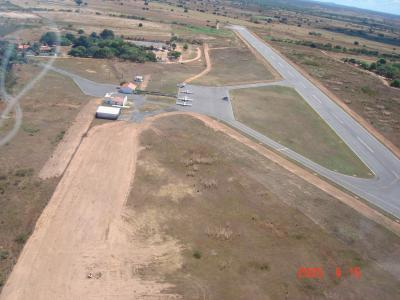
- IATA: QIG; ICAO: SNIG; LID: CE0007

Summary
- Airport type: Public
- Operator: Infraero (2023–2025); Visac Aeroportos (2025-present)
- Serves: Iguatu
- Time zone: BRT (UTC−03:00)
- Elevation AMSL: 215 m (705 ft)
- Coordinates: 06°20′48″S 039°17′40″W
- Website: www4.infraero.gov.br/aeroporto-iguatu/

Map
- Location in Brazil

Runways
Direction	Length		Surface
Direction	m	ft	Surface
16/34	1,422	4,665	Asphalt

Statistics (2024)
- Passengers: 1,942
- Aircraft Operations: 932
- Metric tonnes of cargo: 2
- Statistics: Infraero; Sources: Airport Website, ANAC, DECEA

Dr. Francisco Tomé da Frota Airport (IATA: QIG, ICAO: SNIG), is the airport serving Iguatu, Brazil.

It is managed by contract by Visac Aeroportos.

== History ==
Previously operated by Infraero, on April 22, 2025 the State of Ceará signed a one-year contract of operation with Visac Aeroportos.

== Access ==
The airport is located 2 km (1 mi) from downtown Iguatu.

== See also ==
- List of airports in Brazil
