= Iguatu =

Municipality in Ceará, Brazil

- Municipality
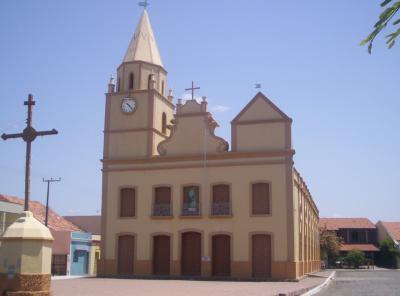

- Flag Coat of arms

- Location in Ceará state

- Location in Brazil
- Coordinates: 06°21′32″S 39°17′56″W
- Country: Brazil
- Region: Northeast
- State: Ceará

Population (2022 Census)
  - Total: 98,064
  - Estimate (2025): 102,588
- Time zone: UTC−3 (BRT)

Iguatu is a Brazilian municipality located in the state of Ceará, located in the Central-south region of the state. It was, through the 1960s, 70s and 80s, an important cotton producer, being able to hit national records of fiber production. Currently its furniture industries are the drivers of the city's economy.

Iguatu is the native land to musicians and composers Elezear de Carvalho, Humberto Teixeira, and the Bishop Mário Teixeira Gurgel.

== History ==
The locality previously housed a village of the Indigenous Quixelô people. The region was known as Telha, referring to a large lagoon of the same name in the surrounding area, when the Jesuits arrived in the region from 1707 onwards. After struggles of resistance by the indigenous people and their surrender, they collaborated with the colonizers.

In the municipality of Iguatu, four train stations were inaugurated (Sussuaruna, Iguatu, Jaguaribe Mirim and José de Alencar), which consolidated the economic base of the municipality. The station was the terminus of the Baturité Railway line until August 1916, when it was extended to Cedro, and the following year, to Lavras. Therefore, the inhabitants of Lavras, further south, had to go to Iguatu to board the train. Today it is one of the operational stations of the Companhia Ferroviária do Nordeste, the current concessionaire of the stretch. According to Assis Lima, the building underwent a major renovation in the mid-1970s, losing its original characteristics.

In 2009, the municipality saw the end of one of the cotton processing industries (CIDAO), which certainly supplied the trains to Fortaleza, transporting the cotton and oil produced there. It was demolished to make way for a university campus that houses the State University of Ceará (UECE), the Regional University of Cariri (URCA) and the CENTEC Institute. Its tracks and even wagons that existed until November in its depots were scrapped. In a news report from early 2009, it was stated that the railway material would be kept there: "Within the project made by Campelo, there is the idea of leaving the railway line that passes through the area and two train wagons parked inside CIDAO as a historical way of preserving the memory of the old buildings".

== Transportation ==
Iguatu is served by Dr. Francisco Tomé da Frota Airport.

== Notable people ==
- Eleazar de Carvalho - conductor and composer.
- Humberto Teixeira - composer.
- Aldamira Guedes Fernandes - first woman mayor of Brazil by popular vote

== Climate ==
Climate data for Iguatu (1981–2010)
| Month | Jan | Feb | Mar | Apr | May | Jun | Jul | Aug | Sep | Oct | Nov | Dec | Year |
|---|---|---|---|---|---|---|---|---|---|---|---|---|---|
| Mean daily maximum °C (°F) | 33.4 (92.1) | 32.3 (90.1) | 31.8 (89.2) | 31.1 (88.0) | 31.2 (88.2) | 31.5 (88.7) | 32.4 (90.3) | 33.5 (92.3) | 35.0 (95.0) | 35.7 (96.3) | 35.7 (96.3) | 35.1 (95.2) | 33.2 (91.8) |
| Daily mean °C (°F) | 27.6 (81.7) | 26.8 (80.2) | 26.6 (79.9) | 26.2 (79.2) | 25.9 (78.6) | 25.5 (77.9) | 26.1 (79.0) | 27.1 (80.8) | 28.3 (82.9) | 29.3 (84.7) | 29.5 (85.1) | 29.2 (84.6) | 27.3 (81.1) |
| Mean daily minimum °C (°F) | 23.1 (73.6) | 22.6 (72.7) | 22.5 (72.5) | 22.3 (72.1) | 21.7 (71.1) | 20.6 (69.1) | 20.7 (69.3) | 21.3 (70.3) | 22.3 (72.1) | 23.1 (73.6) | 23.5 (74.3) | 23.6 (74.5) | 22.3 (72.1) |
| Average precipitation mm (inches) | 133.8 (5.27) | 167.3 (6.59) | 221.2 (8.71) | 196.8 (7.75) | 102.7 (4.04) | 27.6 (1.09) | 12.6 (0.50) | 14.4 (0.57) | 12.3 (0.48) | 19.0 (0.75) | 7.9 (0.31) | 67.5 (2.66) | 983.1 (38.70) |
| Average precipitation days (≥ 1.0 mm) | 10 | 11 | 14 | 14 | 8 | 4 | 3 | 2 | 2 | 1 | 1 | 4 | 74 |
| Average relative humidity (%) | 66.3 | 73.5 | 77.5 | 80.9 | 77.6 | 68.4 | 58.9 | 49.8 | 46.9 | 46.8 | 47.1 | 51.3 | 62.1 |
| Mean monthly sunshine hours | 216.0 | 196.3 | 217.4 | 216.4 | 236.8 | 251.3 | 268.4 | 293.2 | 293.2 | 292.0 | 275.5 | 252.8 | 3,009.3 |
Source: Instituto Nacional de Meteorologia

== See also ==
- List of municipalities in Ceará
- O Ceu do Suely, set in Iguatu-2006
