= Sergio Previtali =

Uruguayan politician

Sergio Previtali Roballo (Montevideo, July 30, 1939 – February 26, 2007) was a Uruguayan politician.

Previtali was a son of the political leader Alba Roballo, founder of the Frente Amplio party in 1971. In the 1966 elections, he was elected as a Deputy for the Colorado Party, while still 27 years old. He occupied his seat between 1967 and 1972. In 1971, he accompanied his mother in the foundation of the Frente Amplio, but he did not keep his post.

After the Uruguayan dictature (1973–1985) Previtali was once more elected to the Chamber of Deputies in the 1989 elections. He occupied the seat between 1990 and 1995.

After the death of his mother in 1996 Previtali retired from active political life, even if he continued be connected with it.
