= Humberto Teixeira =

Brazilian lawyer, politician, musician, and composer

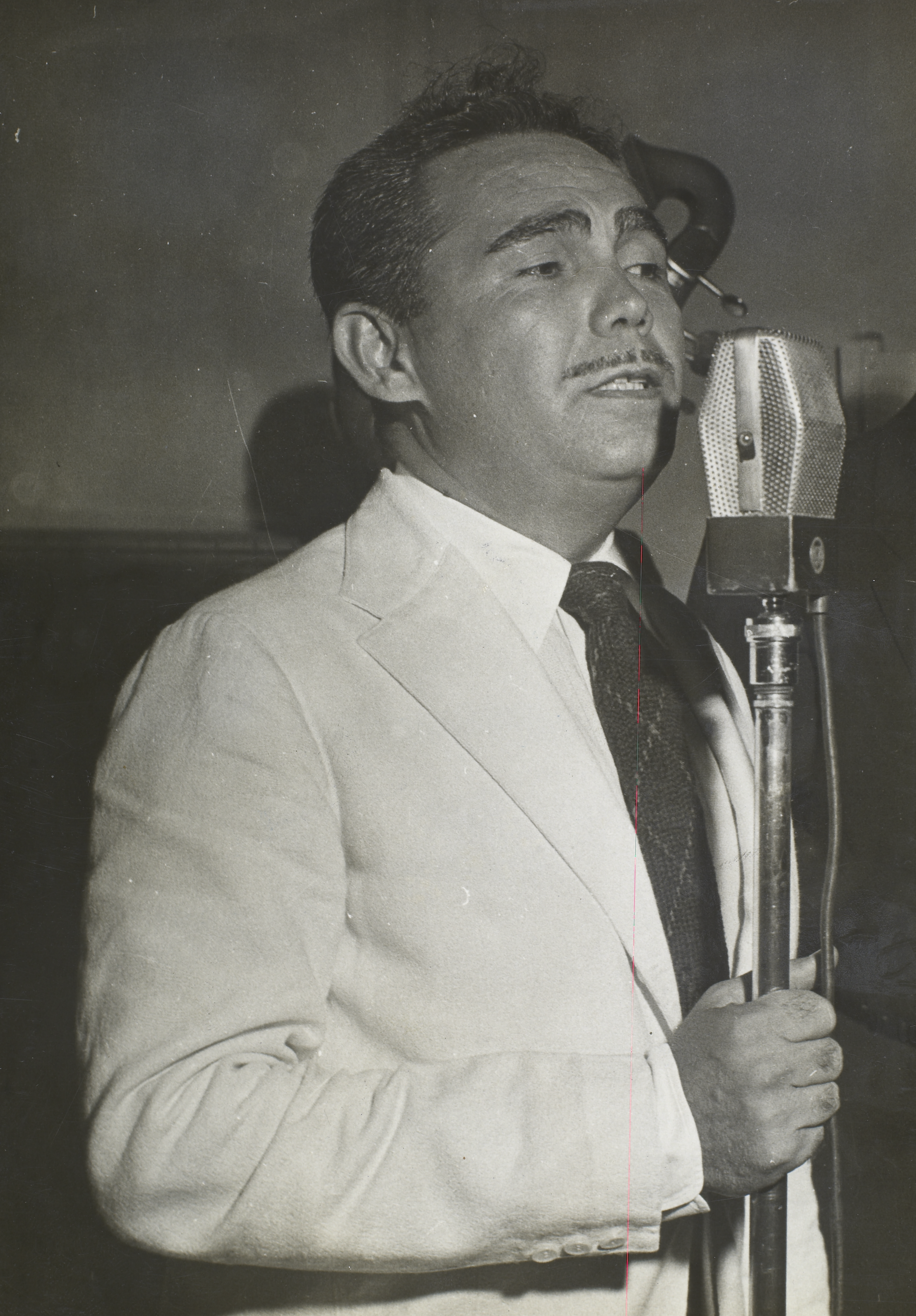
- Humberto Teixeira

Background information
- Born: Humberto Cavalcanti de Albuquerque Teixeira; 5 January 1915; Iguatu, Ceará
- Died: 3 October 1979 (aged 64)
- Genres: Baião
- Occupations: Musician, composer, lawyer, politician

Humberto Cavalcanti de Albuquerque Teixeira (5 January 1915 – 3 October 1979) was a Brazilian lawyer, politician, musician, and composer, mostly known for his partnership with musician Luiz Gonzaga. Together, they wrote one of the most important songs of their era, Asa Branca, in 1947. Teixeira is recognized as a specialist in baião as well as a "master of costumes and popular North-Eastern trends."

Teixeira is also noted for writing the musical copyright laws of Brazil.

== Biography ==
Teixera was born in Iguatu to João Euclides Teixeira and Lucíola Cavalcante Teixeira. He demonstrated musical aptitude at an early age. By six, he already learned to play the musette, flute, and mandolin. His uncle, Lafaiete Teixeira, a conductor, became his first music teacher. He completed his first composition Miss Hermengarda when he was 13 and played the flute in the orchestra that played in the silent films exhibited in Fortaleza's Cine Majestic.

When he was 15, Teixeira moved to Rio de Janeiro. Three years later, he won the Meu Pecadinho during the O Malho carnival music competition. His first recorded music was Sinfonia do Cafe, which he composed with Lirio Panacalli. This song was followed by Kalu and Adeus, Maria Fulô.

In 1954, Teixeira entered politics and was elected as a federal deputy. His legislative accomplishments included the passage of the Humberto Teixeira Law.

Teixeira married Margarida, a concert pianist who was also known by the name of Margot Bittencourt as an actress. She left him for Luís Jatobá, a journalist who used to live with the Teixeiras in the same apartment building. He never remarried after their divorce in 1962. Their daughter, Denise Dummont, is an actress now living in New York.

== Partnership with Luiz Gonzaga ==
Teixeira first met with Gonzaga when the former tried to persuade Lauro Maia into a partnership. When Maia declined, Gonzaga turned to Teixeira who already partnered with Maia, his nephew, when he launched a trend for balanceio. By this time, Teixeira had already written popular songs including standard sambas and modinhas. The composer agreed. This partnership would produce music that would create a new canon in Brazilian music. Their works, which featured samba-canção and imported rhythms, enjoyed success. Their first song No Meu Pe de Serra was released in 1946. However, the second piece, Baião, which was recorded in the same year, was the commercial breakthrough. An account stated that this song aimed to introduce the music and dance of the northeast to the rest of Brazil. It was performed by the group Quatro Ases e um Curinga. Baião created a new dance craze in Brazil that took three years for Gonzaga to record. The song launched a new musical movement that featured an urban popular culture that contained revamped traditional musical styles.

Other popular songs that Teixeira and Gonzaga composed included Mangaratiba, Juazeiro, Paraíba, Qui nem jiló, Xanduzinha, Lorota boa, Assum black, Estrada de Canindé, and Respect Januário.
