= Baltasar Brum =

Uruguayan political figure

Baltasar Brum Rodríguez GCTE
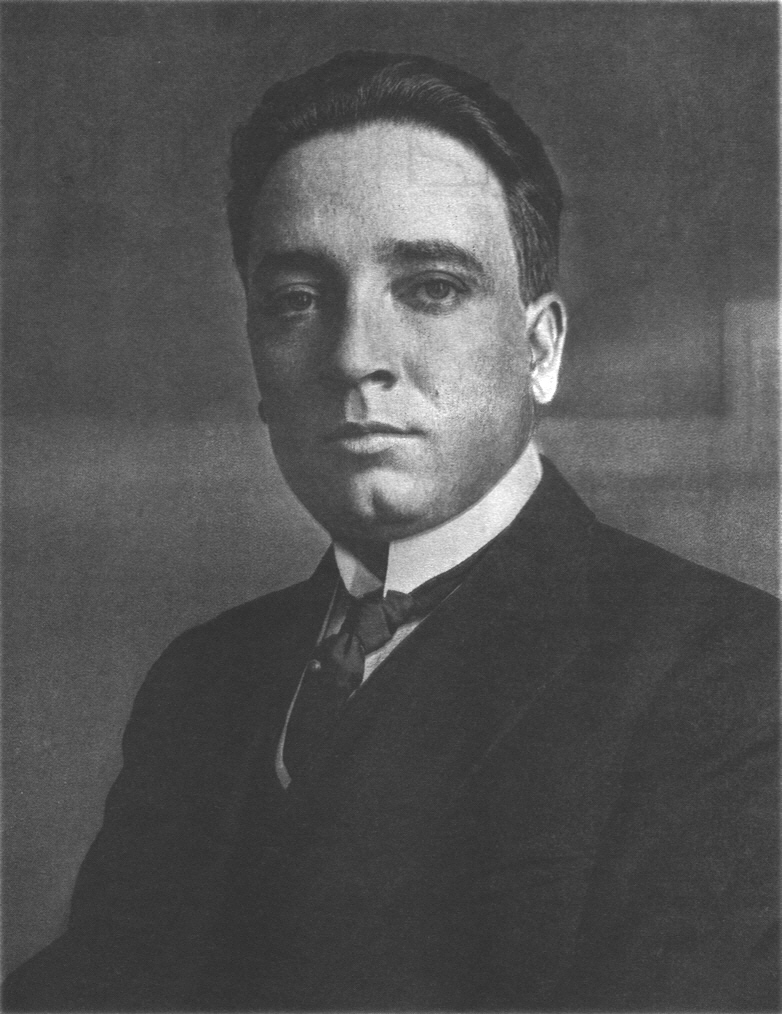
- Baltasar Brum

23rd President of Uruguay
- In office 1 March 1919 – 1 March 1923
- Prime Minister: Feliciano Viera; José Batlle y Ordóñez
- Preceded by: Feliciano Viera
- Succeeded by: José Serrato

6th Chairman of the National Council of Administration of Uruguay
- In office 1 March 1929 – 1 March 1931
- President: Juan Campisteguy
- Preceded by: Luis C. Caviglia
- Succeeded by: Juan Pedro Fabini

Personal details
- Born: 18 June 1883 Artigas Department, Uruguay
- Died: 31 March 1933 (aged 49) Montevideo, Uruguay
- Party: Colorado Party

Baltasar Brum Rodríguez, GCTE (18 June 1883 – 31 March 1933) was a Uruguayan political figure. He was President of Uruguay from 1919 to 1923.

== Background ==
Brum was born in the Department of Artigas near the city of Salto, where he began his education. For his higher studies he passed on to the University of Montevideo where he read law. A student at the Osimani y Llerena Polytechnic Institute, Brum graduated as a lawyer in 1909 and returned to Salto where he set up his law firm. He was also a member of the Economic-Administrative Board, a Professor and Minister and Diplomat. He was also an ardent defender of women's rights and inaugurated the Artigas Monument in Plaza Independencia. Brum was a great promoter of student participation and representation in the areas of co-government, and was editor of the newspaper “Evolución,” of the Association of Students. In 1916 he was appointed chancellor of the Republic in 1916, being the promoter of what became known as the Organization of American States (OAS). Brum's political career started in the municipality of Salto, and José Batlle y Ordóñez had learned of him through a famous controversy held at the Larrañaga Theater with a nationalist journalist, Luis Alberto Thévenet.

His political convictions closely followed those of liberal President José Batlle y Ordóñez, under whom Brum served as Education Minister 1913–1915. He was Interior Minister from 1915 to 1916. Over a period of over five years he worked from the Ministries of Public Instruction, Foreign Affairs, Interior and Finance. During his time as a minister Brum was responsible for reforms including the extension of free education to secondary education and the setting up of a network of popular libraries. Brum also proposed a law condemning pimping, which marked, as noted by one observer, "a turning point in the treatment of this painful exploitation, which had worsened during those years, with the arrival to the country, mainly from Argentina, of dark organizations."

Brum subsequently served as Foreign Minister under the Presidency of Feliciano Viera; in the latter capacity, Brum was noted for promoting good relations with the United States, which had joined World War I against Germany in 1917.During his time as Foreign Minister Brum two visits abroad. The first was at the head of the Mission to Brazil to return the visit made by a Brazilian Minister, Dr. Lauro Muller, while the second was at the special invitation of Woodrow Wilson to the United States in the Uruguayan cruiser 'Montevideo.' Brum also negotiated, as noted by one study, "a number of treaties, including one with the United States, two with Germany, four with Paraguay, four with Belgium, one with Chile, one with Japan, one with Argentina, four with France, two with England, four with Russia, four with Sweden, four with Switzerland, four with Norway, four with Holland, four with Austria-Hungary, and one with Italy." He also arranged with Brazil an unrestricted treaty of arbitration, and also issued a decree to secure the non-belligerent position for Uruguay in case of war between countries of other continents.

While serving in Foreign Affairs, Brum was (according to one observer) "a fundamental figure in the internationalist vision of a Party that, like Colorado, always looked towards the world. His Ministry of Foreign Affairs, together with Juan Antonio Buero, marked a time in the course of the country, which after years of British hegemony was approaching the United States, where Wilson had left behind the "stick" diplomacy and began a time of multilateralism. In line with Batlle's proposal in 1907 in The Hague in favor of compulsory arbitration for the resolution of international conflicts, Brum developed its application in the bilateral agreements that were signed, the first with Italy and then with other countries. In the great conflagrations, it also marked an unequivocal line of democratic solidarity. Given Germany's announcement of submarine war, in the 1st. World War, Uruguay -Brum Minister- protests because "it violates indisputable rights of neutrals and offends humanity." When the US finally breaks relations with Germany, Brum himself sends a message of solidarity, saying that although he maintains his neutrality, because he does not act as a belligerent, he recognizes "the justice and nobility of the feelings that in this emergency have guided the President Wilson. A concept is coined that will later reach the 2nd. World War: we are neutral because we do not participate in hostilities, but "we are neither indifferent nor impartial." "

== President of Uruguay ==
=== Notes ===
Brum thus came to presidential office in 1919 as one with a reputation as a pro-American facilitator of U.S. interests.

During Brum's presidency, a duel took place between him and Luis Alberto de Herrera of the Blanco, or National, Party. The dislike of each other by the two men was strong enough that President Brum challenged Herrera to a duel with pistols (legal in Uruguay at the time), which was fought near Montevideo on 14 December 1922, in front of several hundred government officials. Though each man fired two shots and the other from a distance of 25 paces, neither was struck by a bullet.

=== Domestic policies ===
Several reforms were realized during the course of the Brum presidency. A law of 22 October 1919 repealed a 10% tax on salaries of persons "connected with the military service, including those in the active service, those who have retired, and those on the pension list." An aviation pension law, which was promulgated on 29 October 1919, provided pension rights to dependents and relatives in case of death of military aviators and pilots, as well as members of the Military Aviation School, from aviation accidents while on duty. With the government's approval, on 30 December 1919 the Banco de Seguros del Estado started the building of workmen's houses in Montevideo. Under a 1919 law, the B.H.U. "authorized loans to build houses in industrial neighborhoods." Also in 1919, a Public Utilities Pension Fund was established covering water, telephone, street car, telegraph, railway and gas-company workers. This provided protection against unemployment, death, disability and old age.

A school budget passed in 1920 provided for increased salaries for teachers and an increase of teaching personnel and schools. In addition, "Funds are also set aside for the aid of already existing commissions, which provide milk and clothes for needy children." A presidential decree of 21 April 1920 "authorized the founding of dental clinics in the military hospital and in the naval school to care for the teeth of the students and the personnel of the armed forces." A decree of 14 May 1920 provided specific regulations of working conditions for maritime work. A law of 27 May 1920 "authorized the CNA to project a plan of economic constructions destined to 'provide cheap rooms to the most needy classes.'" A Decree of 18 October 1920 included messengers in the Law of eight hours. An executive decree of 18 June 1920 "orders the establishment of an economic and rural credit section for the registration of agricultural mortgages and the encouragement of agricultural loans."

A gynaecology clinic and polyclinic for the treatment of children was established in the military hospital. In 1920, the licenses and attendance of employees of public offices dependent on the National Administration Council were regulated, under which all employees were granted an annual leave of 20 days with pay, "an excellent provision for the double point of view of rest and the rotation of officials in the same job, as a means of correcting deficiencies and tending to the improvement of the services." Another law made 24 hours of rest compulsory "after six days of labour or every six days if the system of rest in rotation were adopted." Domestic servants were also covered, "with a special act of 19 November 1920 providing for this group and chauffeurs." Also in 1920, the principle that the employer "who is in charge of the exploitation of industries or the performance of work of any kind, is civilly liable for all accidents that occur to his workers because of work or on the occasion of it," was incorporated into legislation. The legislator made a long list of jobs and industries in which this principle was applicable "and added that the Executive Power could expand the payroll." Domestic service was included in this reform. In the event of temporary disability, the worker would receive compensation equal to half of his salary, in the event of permanent partial disability a life annuity equal to half the reduction in salary, and in the event of absolute permanent disability a life annuity equal to two-thirds of the annual salary. In the event that the accident had caused death "the spouse would receive a life annuity of 20% of the salary and the minor children an annuity of 15% at 40% of annual salary depending on the number of children."

Various laws were also passed by the General Assembly "to contemplate the situation of the tenants punished by the great crisis." A law of 1921 "was in charge of regulating the rental of urban dwellings in the city of Montevideo and in the towns of the country departments." The rent couldn't be raised during the three-year period, and the type for setting the maximum rent was adopted as the one existing on 31 December 1919. A Rent Commission was established in the capital, consisting of three members appointed by the National Administration Council, the High Court of Justice and the Departmental Council of Montevideo, and in the campaign departments "Commissions made up of officials dependent on those same high authorities." The Rental Commissions would resolve "in an unappealable manner all the issues initiated by both the owners and the tenants." The President was also authorized by the legislature to order the building of cheap houses for laborers. The Assembly was asked for a supplementary credit of $50,000 to go to the aid of the working population of Cerro, "who lacked work in the refrigerators and who were struggling in misery." The subsidy was raised successively to $100,000 and $150,000 "as a means of providing food for all the inhabitants of the country without means of subsistence." The task was then given to Public Assistance to provide food to the unemployed.

An Act of 1921 provided for the protection of factory workers. A law of 13 July 1921 provided for special loans by the Mortgage Bank for the building of workers' houses. In 1921 over 100 houses were built by the government. Also in 1921, the Executive Power authorized the Public Assistance to invest $7,640 monthly in the organization of the early childhood protection service and the wet nurse office. To care for street minors, by a decree of 1920 a section of the "Bóvedas" was designated for overnight accommodation of these minors, under the administration and surveillance of the Police. A second decree issued the following year entrusted the National Women's Council with the patronage of that shelter and the administration of the "Quinta de Menores;" a new service for the same street minors.

A law of the General Assembly authorized the National Administration Council "to gradually apply the agrarian pledge law in force since 1918." In use of it, the National Council created within the National Inspection of Livestock and Agriculture a section of "Economy and Rural Credit" that was intended "for the promotion of agricultural credit and the registration of pledge contracts." A Decree of 2 October 1922 acted as a guide "in determining which foods are to be considered fit or unfit for human consumption." Also in 1922, the Mortgage Bank was authorized to grant loans on land intended for agriculture, up to 15% of each series of mortgage securities, while loans could reach up to 85% of the value of each farm. A 1922 law decreed various measures aimed at guaranteeing the physical integrity of workers, with entrepreneurs of industrial establishments or of any type of works obliged to adopt the precautions determined by the same law, to reduce the possible job hazards. That same year, Public Assistance opened the Pedro Visca Children's Hospital in 1922, attached to the Dámaso Larrañaga Asylum, with pavilions for medicine and surgery, a polyclinic, laboratories and complementary facilities.

In 1922, coverage of the Public Utilities Pension Fund was extended to include employees in medical-aid societies and in shipbuilding and repairs. A decree of 1922 required every employer or contractor of undertakings covered by labor laws "now in force to provide himself with all the documents provided by the national labor office within 10 days after beginning operations." Also, within three days after a declaration of a strike or lockout "the employer or contractor of the establishment must notify the national labor office." On 24 October 1922 a decree was issued "amplifying the provisions in force in regard to tenders to the State for public works or material in order to put Uruguayan industry in a more favourable position for securing contracts than foreign industry," and also requiring that "there be included in the contracts made with the State clauses which may benefit the working classes."

The benefits of a weekly rest were extended to rural labourers although, according to one study, "it was already common practice in the interior." Under a law of 15 February 1923 a rural minimum wage was fixed for laborers employed in agricultural or stock-raising work, while requiring employers to furnish the laborers "sanitary living quarters and sufficient food, or in lieu thereof to allow them an additional sum of 0.50 peso (51.7 cents, par) per day or 12 pesos ($12.41, par) per month, as the laborers may desire." In addition, a decree of 16 February 1923 provided for the establishment "of training courses for the labor inspectors of Montevideo."

The rural minimum wage policy, which José Batlle y Ordóñez in 1919 proposed in the conferences of his party's leaders that the party advocate, proved a divisive one for the Colorados. As noted by one study, “From a three-to-one dominance of the lower house the majority declined to sixty-seven against fifty-six in 1917 and an actual minority of the votes cast in the election. In 1919 the ‘regular’ Deputies of Batlle's party were in a minority in the Camara. Inability to arrive at a programme that would satisfy all branches of the party and to organize and maintain a strict party discipline enabled the opposition to keep the minimum wage bill in committee for about two years.”

President Brum also proposed to a Commission appointed by the National Council of Administration, as a tribute to the Centennial celebrations, a program of laws taken from the plan of the League of Nations. These were (1.) The work cannot be considered as a merchandise or article of commerce. (2.) The right of association. (3.) Payment of a salary that ensures workers the highest possible level. (4.) The workday of eight hours a day or 48 hours a week. (5.) The weekly rest of at least 24 hours. (6.) The abolition of child labor and the restriction of the work of young people of both sexes, in such a way that they can continue their education and ensure their physical development. (7.) The principle of equal pay without distinction between the sexes for work of equal value. (8.)The real and effective application of labor protection laws and regulations.

Many of these postulates, Brum said in his Message, had already been incorporated into legislation, for which Uruguay had deserved the praise of Lloyd George, Clemenceau and Wilson. But others were missing that were projected or that await legislative sanction.

=== International affairs ===
According to one study, Brum’s administration "saw Uruguay reach imaginative and constructive heights of participation in inter-American affairs certainly not previously and perhaps not since attained". In an address made on April the 21st 1920 on the subject of “American Solidarity” Brum outlined a proposed "American league of nations"-"if the powerful nation of the North will lend itself to the fulfilment of a policy of justice and of equality with its sisters of America, it will be our duty to cooperate in its proposals." This proposed league would, according to one study, “work in harmony with the League at Geneva and would have authority and responsibility over peculiarly American problems, including defense of the American states against either Old World or New World aggression.” Brum's proposals would have had the practical effect of converting the Monroe doctrine into a multilateral Pan-American doctrine. In submitting suggestions for the Fifth Inter-American Conference at Santiago in 1923 Uruguay's government "advocated consideration of what was essentially the Brum plan." However, the Monroe Doctrine was still being maintained and applied unilaterally. The Uruguayan proposals never came to a vote, "due almost certainly," according to one authority, "to the opposition of the United States". At a conference held at Montevideo a decade later however, the United States had reversed its attitude and agreed implicitly to the multilateralizing if the Monroe Doctrine. But Brum, as noted by one study, "had by that time died a tragic death some nine months since. He was years ahead of his time. His proposals adumbrated the hemisphere security pact of 1947, the tighter inter-American organization evolved at the Bogotá Conference in 1948, and the relationship between that organization and the United Nations."

== Post-presidency ==
Following the end of his presidency, Brum became co-director of the newspaper El Día, with César Batlle Pacheco, until 1929, when he joined the National Administration Council, the other branch of the Executive. According to one observer, “There he once again made his mark on the land issue, on housing (he even presided over the Banco Hipotecario for a short period of time) and especially on the legal status of women, with a great project on their right to vote, which would not be consecrated until two decades later.”

In 1929, Brum put forward a land reform project. He gave a conference in the Plaza Constitución de Fray Bentos which analyzed the problem of unemployment and the need to provide land to those working it. As noted by one observer, Brum wished to hand over "People's Lands," which consisted of the purchase by the State of properties "to transfer them to the families of farmers and rural workers in general, under advantageous conditions for their exploitation." At the time newspapers reported that “Dr. Brum, in his conference, indicated as one of the safest means to face and resolve the problem of unemployment, that of acquiring by the State appreciable extensions of national lands, later being the same State is in charge of distributing and administering them, providing them under favorable conditions to the true worker, to the one who is willing to make them produce, which will be advantageous for the one who works them and for the State itself as well, since they, worked in this way, will contribute not only to solve this difficult problem, but also to give the nation new sources of wealth that balance its economy, that balance that all countries so need - and ours is no exception - to be able to continue its upward march in the difficult current moment.” Brum, however, failed to realize these plans.

== Historical and literary interests ==
Beyond the strictly political, Baltasar Brum was noted for interests in Uruguayan history and folklore. During his presidential term of office he took measures with a view to preserving and protecting the historic Fortaleza de Santa Teresa in the Rocha Department and after leaving office Brum collaborated in the preparation of related literature.

== President Gabriel Terra's rule by decree and Brum's suicide ==
On 31 March 1933, on the installation of President Gabriel Terra's rule by decree, Brum attempted to lead resistance to Terra's government. After having increasingly realized during the course of that day that Terra's authoritarian rule enjoyed at least tacit support by many Uruguayans, Brum hurried into the middle of a road in Montevideo, was heard to shout viva la libertad! viva Batlle! (long live liberty! long live Batlle!), and committed suicide by gunshot. He was aged 49 at the time of his death.

To some observers, Brum represented a self-sacrificing romantic streak within Uruguayan politics at a time when many Uruguayans were prepared tacitly to accept extrajudicial changes brought in by Terra. To others, Brum's spectacular suicide suggested the presence of elements of mental instability, which, however, was not medically proven.

== Family and heritage ==
His brother Alfeo Brum later served as Vice President of Uruguay.

== Honours and awards ==
=== National honours ===
- A town in Artigas Department is named after him.

=== Foreign honours ===
Portugal:

- Grand Cross of the Order of the Tower and Sword (16 November 1922)

== See also ==
- Politics of Uruguay
- List of political families § Uruguay
- Baltasar Brum, Artigas § History
- Fortaleza de Santa Teresa § Folklore and legends

Political offices
| Preceded by Feliciano Viera | President of Uruguay; 1919–1923 | Succeeded by José Serrato |
