= Lajes, Rio Grande do Norte =

Municipality in Rio Grande do Norte, Brazil

Lajes
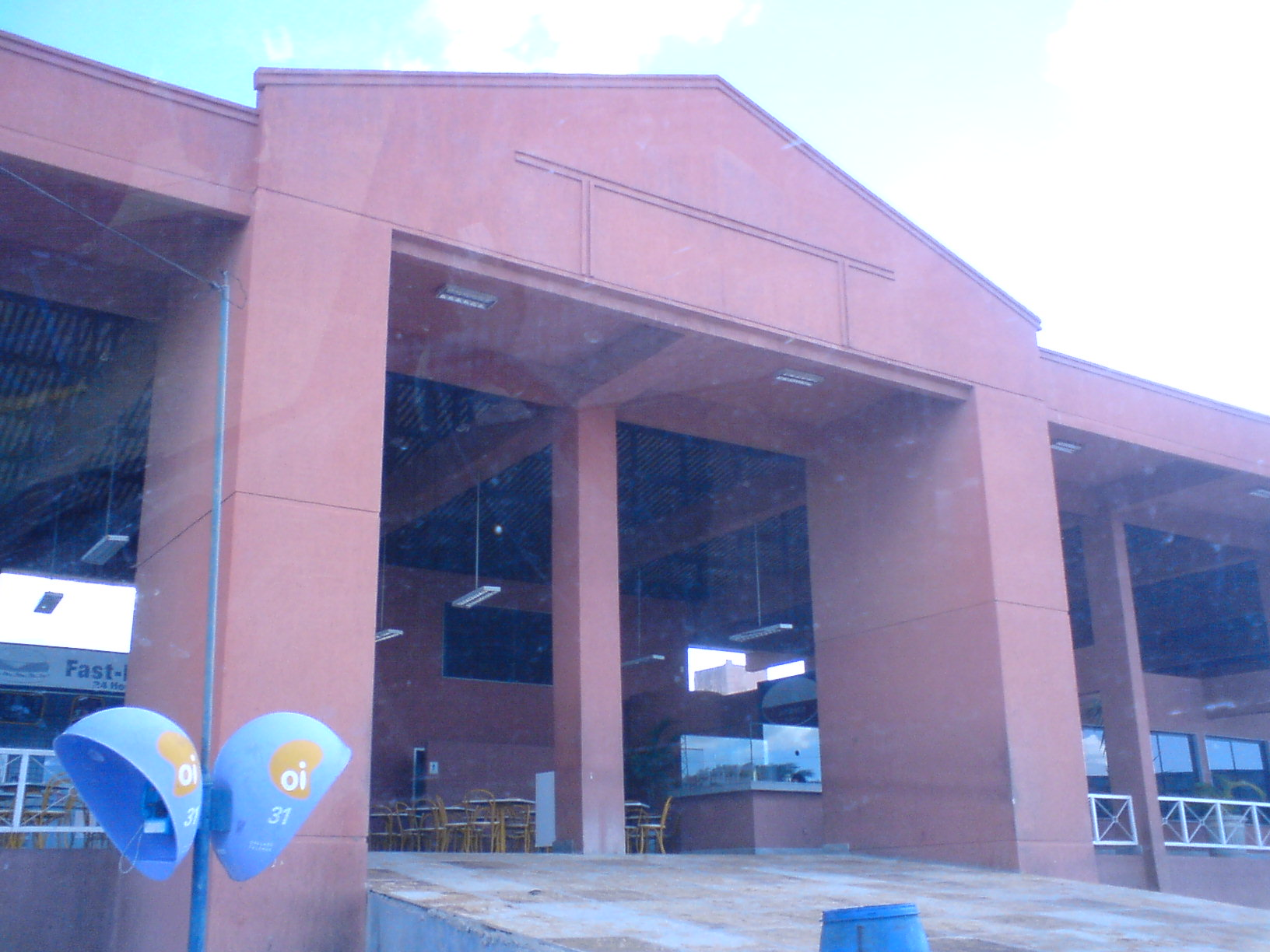
- A road shop in Lajes.

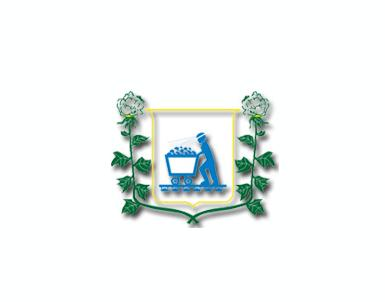
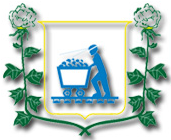
- Flag Coat of arms
- Nickname: Lajes do Cabugi
- Motto(s): Minha Terra, Meu Lugar (My Land, My Place)
- Location in Rio Grande do Norte and Brazil
- Coordinates: 05°42′00″S 36°14′42″W
- Country: Brazil
- Region: Northeast
- State: Rio Grande do Norte
- Settled: November 25, 1914

Government
  - Mayor: Benes Leocádio (PP)

Area
  - Total: 676.417 km^{2} (261.166 sq mi)
- Elevation: 590 m (1,940 ft)

Population (2020)
  - Total: 11,344
  - Density: 14.7/km^{2} (38/sq mi)
- Time zone: UTC−3 (BRT)
- HDI (2000): 0.640 – medium

Lajes is a municipality in Rio Grande do Norte, Brazil. Pico do Cabugi is located there. On January 1, 1929, Alzira Soriano was sworn mayor of the city, becoming the first female mayor in Brazil and in all South America.
