= George Reid Andrews =

American historian of Afro-Latin America

George Reid Andrews is an American historian of Afro-Latin America, and currently a distinguished professor emeritus at the University of Pittsburgh.

== Published works ==
- The Afro-Argentines of Buenos Aires, 1800–1900 (University of Wisconsin Press, 1980)
- Blacks and Whites in São Paulo, Brazil, 1888–1988 (University of Wisconsin Press, 1991)
- The Social Construction of Democracy, work coedited with Herrick Chapman (Macmillan and New York University Press, 1995)
- Afro-Latin America, 1800–2000 (Oxford University Press, 2004)
- Blackness in the White Nation: A History of Afro-Uruguay (University of North Carolina Press, 2010)
- Afro-Latin America: Black Lives, 1600–2000 (Harvard University Press, 2016)
