= Hospital Centro Geriátrico Dr. Luis Piñeyro del Campo =

Hospital for the elderly in Uruguay

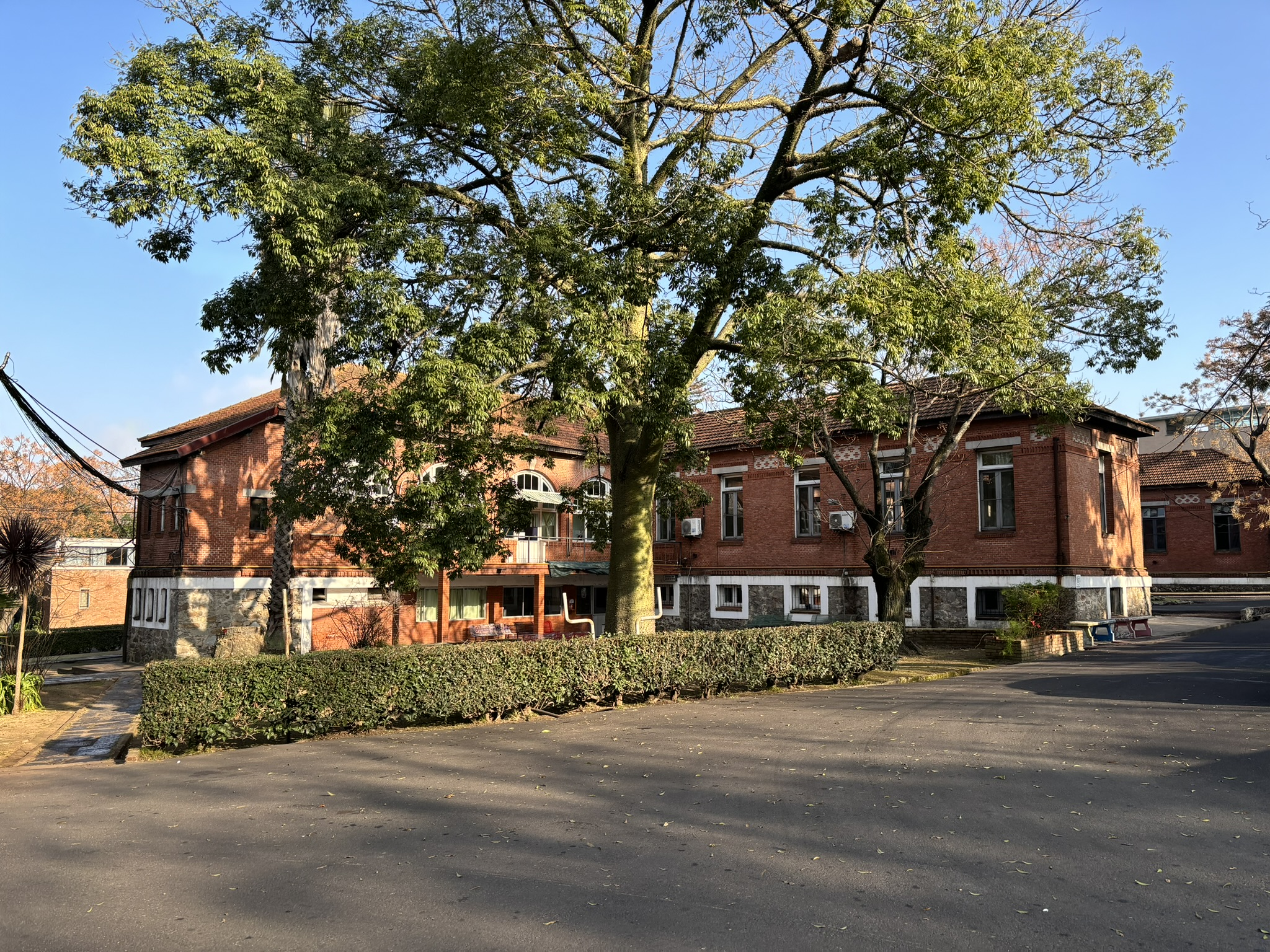

Geography
- Location: Larravide 2351, Unión, Montevideo, Uruguay

Organisation
- Care system: Public
- Type: Geriatric

History
- Former name: Asilo de Mendigos
- Opened: 1922

Hospital Centro Geriátrico Dr. Luis Piñeyro del Campo, locally known as "el Piñeyro", is a public hospital in Montevideo, Uruguay, devoted to healthcare and well-being of elderly people.

Within the orbit of ASSE, the Hospital Piñeyro del Campo provides comprehensive psychosocial care according to the needs related to aging, through multidisciplinary teams and in different units according to the degree of dependency. They also have access to activities for the prevention of cognitive impairment, plastic and physical activities, reiki, vegetable garden and music, among others.

Its name honors Luis Piñeyro del Campo, a 20th-century physician and philanthropist.
