= Inés Enríquez Frödden =

Chilean politician

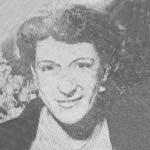

Deputy of the Republic of Chile for Valdivia, La Unión & Río Bueno
- In office 1957 – 1969

Deputy of the Republic of Chile for Concepción, Talcahuano, Tomé, Yumbel & Coronel
- In office April 24, 1951 – 1953

Intendant of the Province of Concepción
- In office 1950 – 1951
- President: Gabriel González Videla
- Preceded by: Jorge Rivera Parga

Personal details
- Born: Inés Leonor Enríquez Frödden; November 11, 1913 Concepción, Chile
- Died: August 15, 1998 (aged 84) Santiago, Chile
- Party: Radical Party
- Relations: Marco Enríquez-Ominami (great-nephew); Miguel Enríquez (nephew)
- Education: University of Concepción
- Occupation: Lawyer and politician

Inés Enríquez Frödden (1913–1998) was a Chilean politician. She became the first female Intendant in Chile in 1950, and the first female representative of the Lower House in 1951. She focused on the social rights of women and children.
