= Baltasar Brum, Artigas =

Baltasar Brum
- Town
- Location in Uruguay
- Coordinates: 30°43′0″S 57°20′0″W
- Country: Uruguay
- Department: Artigas Department

Population (2011)
  - Total: 2,531
- Time zone: UTC -3
- Postal code: 55001
- Dial plan: +598 4776 (+4 digits)

Baltasar Brum is a town in the Artigas Department of northern Uruguay.

== Geography ==
The town is located south of the hill Cuchilla Guaviyú on the road that separates from Route 3 in an eastward direction towards the spa town Termas del Arapey in Salto Department, 35 kilometres (22 mi) northeast of the spa. It is also the point where the railroad track from Montevideo splits in two directions, one towards Bella Unión and one towards Artigas.

== History ==
Previously it was known as "Cabellos" and it may correspond to the village "Jacinto R. Sant-Anna" which was recognized as a "Pueblo" by Decree of 6 February 1918 in the area called "Estación Isla de Cabellos". On 1 November 1932, "the group of houses around Estación Cabellos" was declared a "Pueblo" (village) by the Act of Ley N° 8.907. On 4 January 1956, it was renamed after the President of Uruguay Baltasar Brum by the Act of Ley N° 12.266.

== Population ==
In 2011, it had a population of 2,531.

Year	Population
1908	1,867
1963	1,764
1975	1,753
1985	1,627
1996	2,144
2004	2,472
2011	2,531

Source: Instituto Nacional de Estadística de Uruguay
