= Alzira Soriano =

Brazilian politician

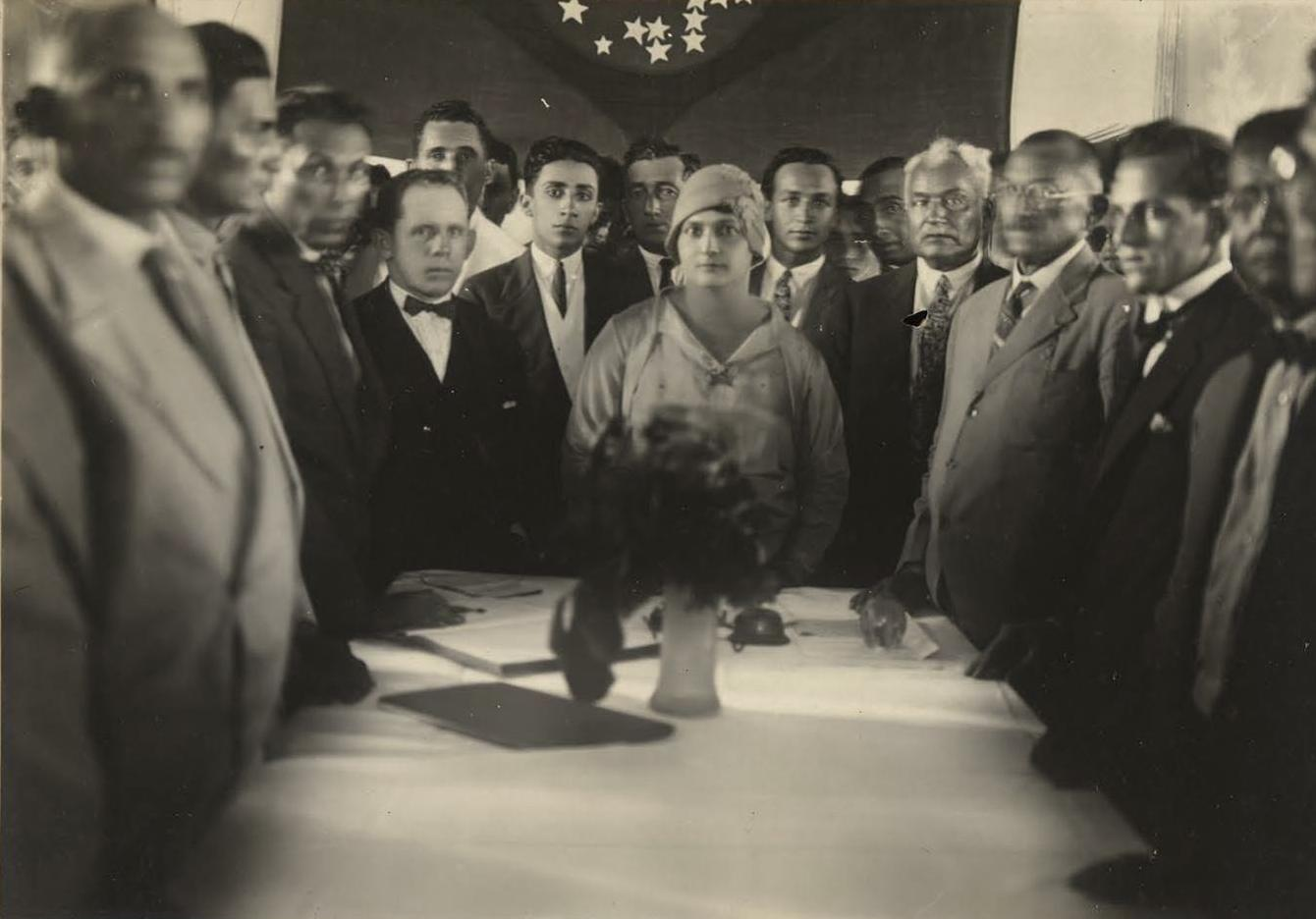
- Alzira Soriano in 1929

Mayor of Lajes
- In office 1929–1930

Personal details
- Born: 29 April 1887
- Died: 28 May 1963 (aged 76)
- Children: 3

Luísa Alzira Teixeira Soriano (April 29, 1887 – May 28, 1963) was a Brazilian politician who served as the mayor of Lajes, Rio Grande do Norte. In 1928, she became the first female mayor in Brazil and South America, at the age of 32. She was a widow and a mother of three daughters.
