= Alcira Espinoza Schmidt de Villegas =

Alcira Espinoza Schmidt de Villegas was a Bolivian politician. She was appointed Minister of Labour and Health in 1969. She was the first woman to be cabinet minister of her country.
