= Alcira Cardona Torrico =

Bolivian writer (1926–2003)

- Born: 23 January 1926; Oruro, Bolivia
- Died: 23 May 2003 (aged 77)
- Occupations: Writer; poet

Alcira Cardona Torrico (23 January 1926 in Oruro – 23 May 2003) was a Bolivian writer and poet. She belonged to group "Gesta bárbara", which was originally founded in La Paz in 1944 with members such as Óscar Alfaro, Julio de la Vega and Armando Alba Zambrana, among others.

The poetic works of Cardona are characterized by their social content, particularly that associated with the Andes and mining. Among her most outstanding and well-known poems are "Carcajada de Estaño" and the autobiographical poem "Apóstrofe". Her work "Loa a la ciudad de Oruro" won a poetry contest in Oruro in 1944.
