= Neighborhoods of Haifa =

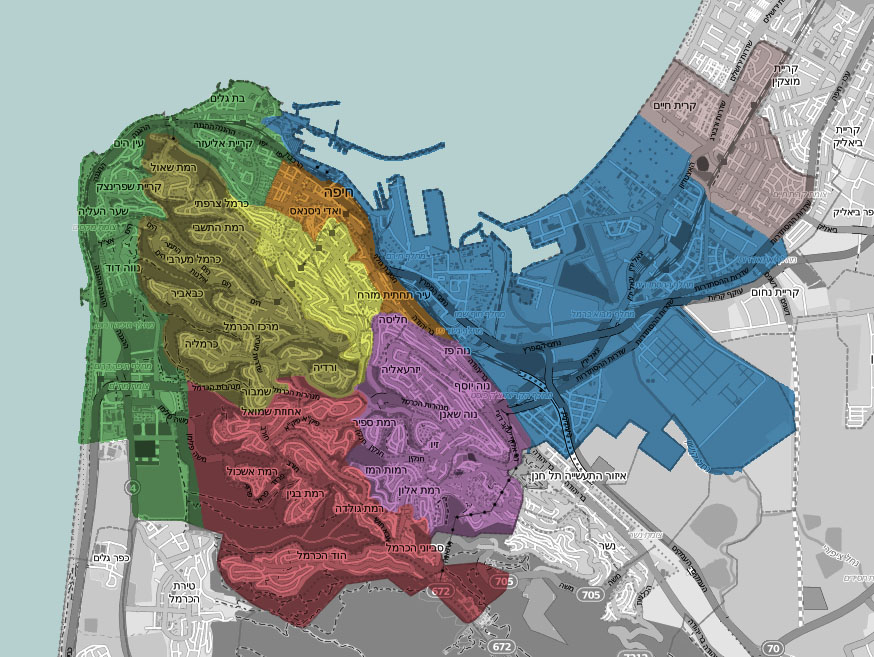
Haifa subdivisions

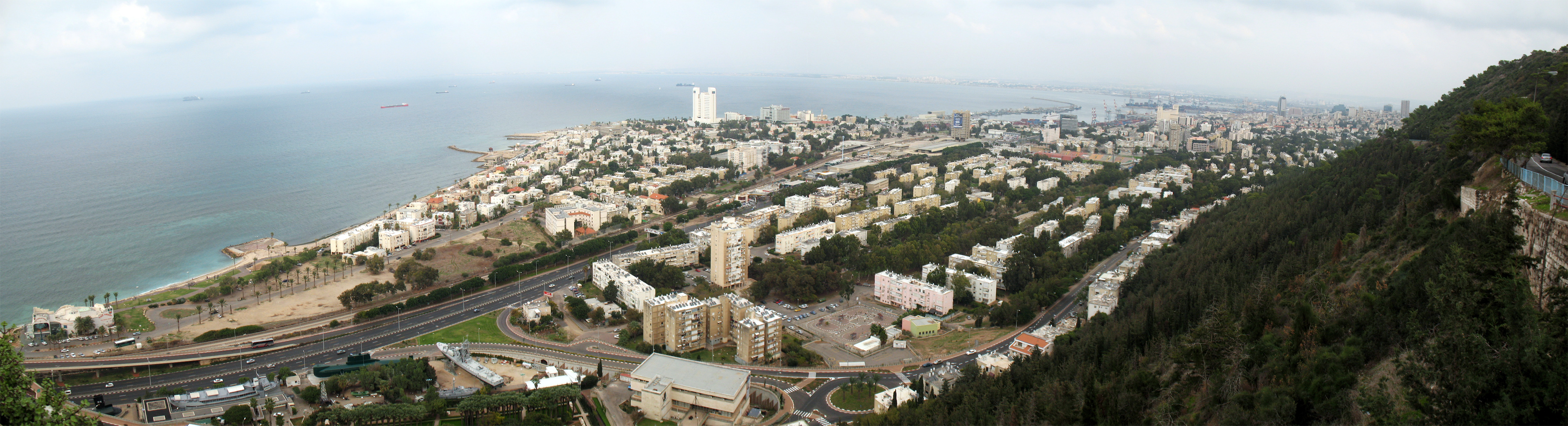
Panorama of Bat Galim – Photograph from Stella Maris Observatory.

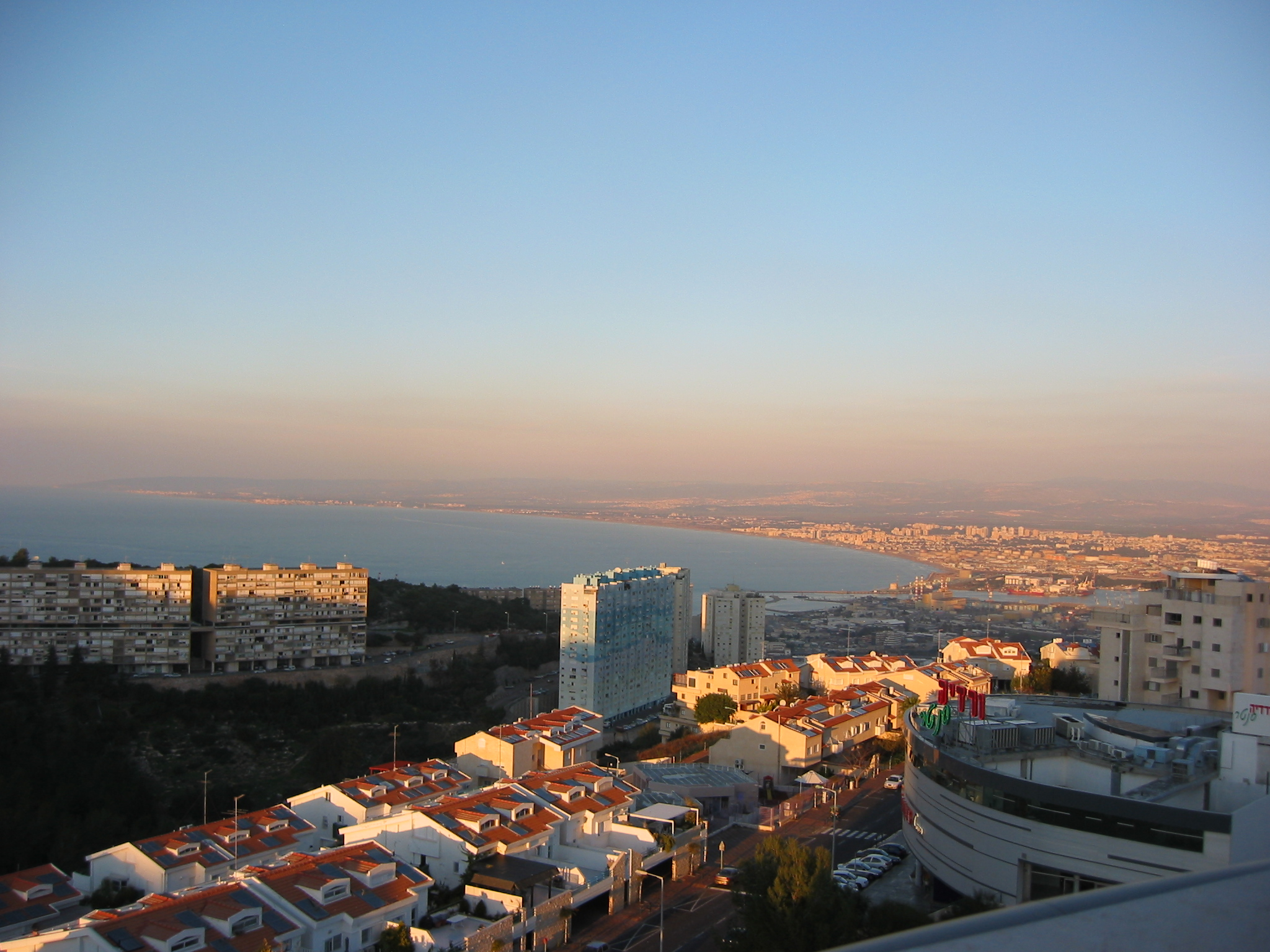
Vardiya neighborhood, Haifa

The Israeli city of Haifa is divided into nine quarters, which are subdivided into subquaters, which are further divided into neighborhoods. "This northern port city is known to charm tourists. It’s bordered by sea and hills, divided into neighborhoods that are lived in by all types of residents, secular and religious, Arab and Jewish, Russian, Ethiopian, even Baha’i," and LBGT, but, according to the Times of Israel, "they don’t mix it up all that much."

This is a list of the neighborhoods of Haifa.

Alphabetical list:

- Ahuza (Horev)
- Bat Galim
- Carmel Center: see Merkaz HaCarmel
- Carmel Ma'aravi (Western Carmel)
- Carmel Tzarfati: see French Carmel
- Carmeliya
- Denia (Hod HaCarmel)
- Ein HaYam
- French Carmel (Carmel Tzarfati)
- German Colony
- HaCarmel: see Denia
- Hadar Elyon
- Hadar HaCarmel
- Haifa el-Atika (Old Haifa)
- Halisa
- Hod HaCarmel: see Denia
- Horev: see Ahuza
- Kiryat Eliezer
- Kiryat Eliyahu
- Kiryat Haim
- Kiryat Rabin (Government District)
- Kiryat Shmuel
- Kababir
- Merkaz HaCarmel (Carmel Center)
- Neve Paz
- Neve Sha'anan
- Neve Yosef
- Newe David
- Old City of Haifa (mostly destroyed)
- Ramat Almogi
- Ramat Alon
- Ramat Alon South
- Ramat Begin (Soroka)
- Ramat Chen
- Ramat Denia
- Ramat Eshkol
- Ramat Golda
- Ramat HaTishbi
- Ramat Haviv
- Ramat Remez
- Ramot Ben-Gurion: see Romema
- Ramot Sapir
- Romema (The Romemot, Ramot Ben-Gurion)
- Shambur
- Kiryat Sprinzak
- Soroka: see Ramat Begin
- Stella Maris
- Vardiya
- Wadi Nisnas
- Wadi Salib
- Western Carmel: see Carmel Ma'aravi
