= Old City of Haifa =

Old City of Haifa البلدة القديمة الحيفا
- Old city
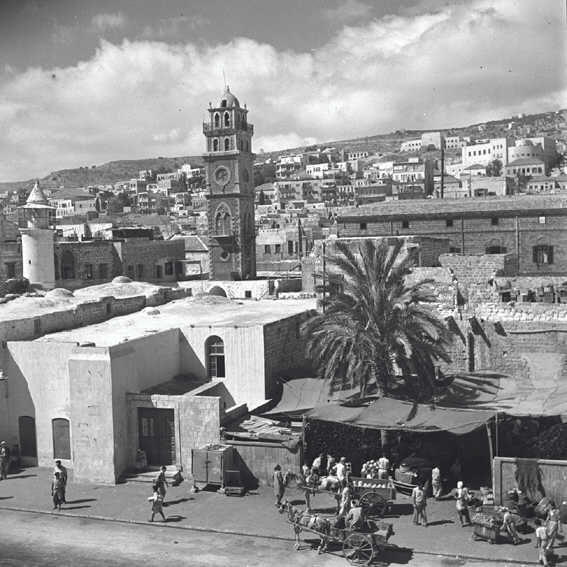
- The Old City of Haifa in 1945

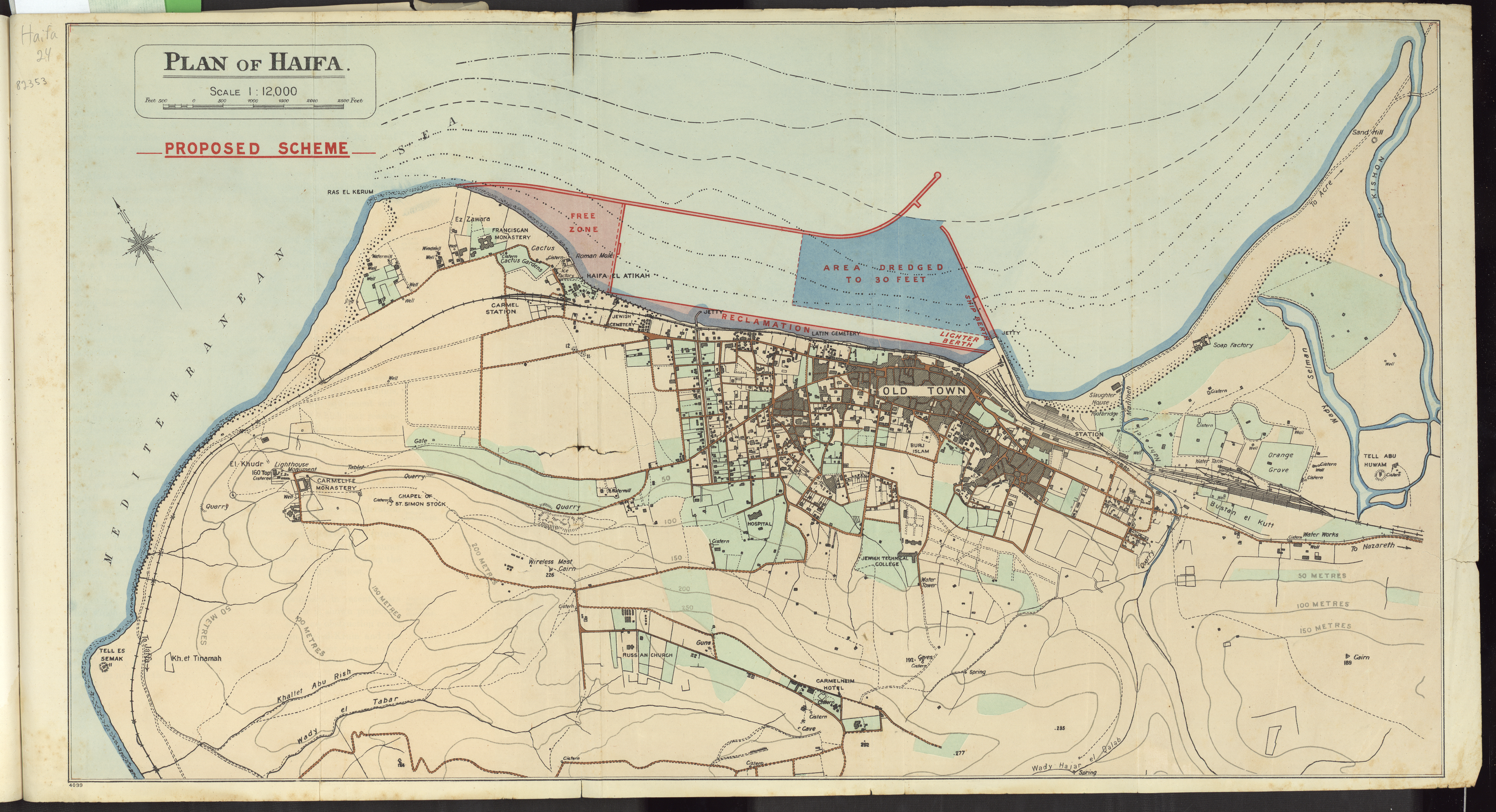
- Plan of Haifa showing the "Old Town", Frederick Palmer, 1923
- Coordinates: 32°48′57″N 35°0′8″E
- City: Haifa
- Established: 1761
- Demolished: 1948

The Old City of Haifa (Arabic: البلدة القديمة الحيفا) was the historic core of Haifa from 1761 until its destruction in the aftermath of the 1948 Palestine war and the Nakba.

The Old City of Haifa had at least two predecessors: the Roman and Byzantine city 2.5 km to the southeast, today known as Tell Abu Hawam, and the medieval city 2.5 km to the northwest, today known as Haifa El-Atika.

The city was founded in its modern location in 1761 by Zahir al-Umar, using stones from Haifa el-Atika. It served as the social, religious and commercial center for Haifa's Palestinian Arab community and resembled other Muslim-majority cities throughout the Ottoman Empire. After World War I Haifa became part of British Mandatory Palestine.

Following the conquest of the city by Zionist forces in April 1948 and the displacement of most of its Arab population, the Old City was largely demolished by the newly established State of Israel.

== History ==
=== Predecessors ===
The archaeological site of Tell Abu Hawam, about 2.5 km southeast of the Old City, contains remains from Iron Age, Roman and Byzantine Haifa. It was abandoned by the twelfth century. By the late eleventh century, under the Fatimid Caliphate a new fortified settlement had developed about 5km northwest of Tell Abu Hawam (about 2.5 km northwest of the Old City); medieval sources refer to two Haifas, an "old" and a "new" Haifa. This new Medieval Haifa is today known as Haifa El-Atika. The Fatimid fortifications enabled a month-long resistance to the forces of Baldwin I of Jerusalem in 1100. In the twelfth century Haifa El-Atika formed a minor lordship in the Principality of Galilee and served as a regional port for Tiberias, as reported by al-Idrisi in 1154, though Acre was to regain its local supremacy. After the rise of the Mamluk Sultanate, Haifa El-Atika declined and was sparsely populated until the early seventeenth century. In 1538 it was a small settlement of 20–32 households. In the 1600s, it became a locus of conflict between the Ma'n dynasty and the Turabay dynasty. In 1631 Haifa El-Atika was rebuilt and resettled by the Turabey governor Aḥmad al-Hārithī, in order to revive commerce and restore security. By 1710 Haifa El-Atika had become a haven for piracy and smuggling, leading the Ottoman sultan Ahmed III in 1716 to order the governor of the Sidon Eyalet, Köse Halil Pasha, to fortify it with defensive towers.

The autonomous ruler of Galilee, Zahir al-Umar, captured Haifa El-Atika between 1757 and 1761 to control customs revenues, secure the coastline, and dominate the route between Haifa and his capital of Acre. Finding the Haifa El-Atika exposed and difficult to defend, Zahir al-Umar relocated the town 3 km southeast in 1761, demolishing the earlier settlement and establishing a new, more defensible site at the location of what became known as the Old City of Haifa. Building materials from Haifa El-Atika were used to construct the new city, and its harbour was blocked with rocks. Its history is no longer visible today.

=== Ottoman era ===
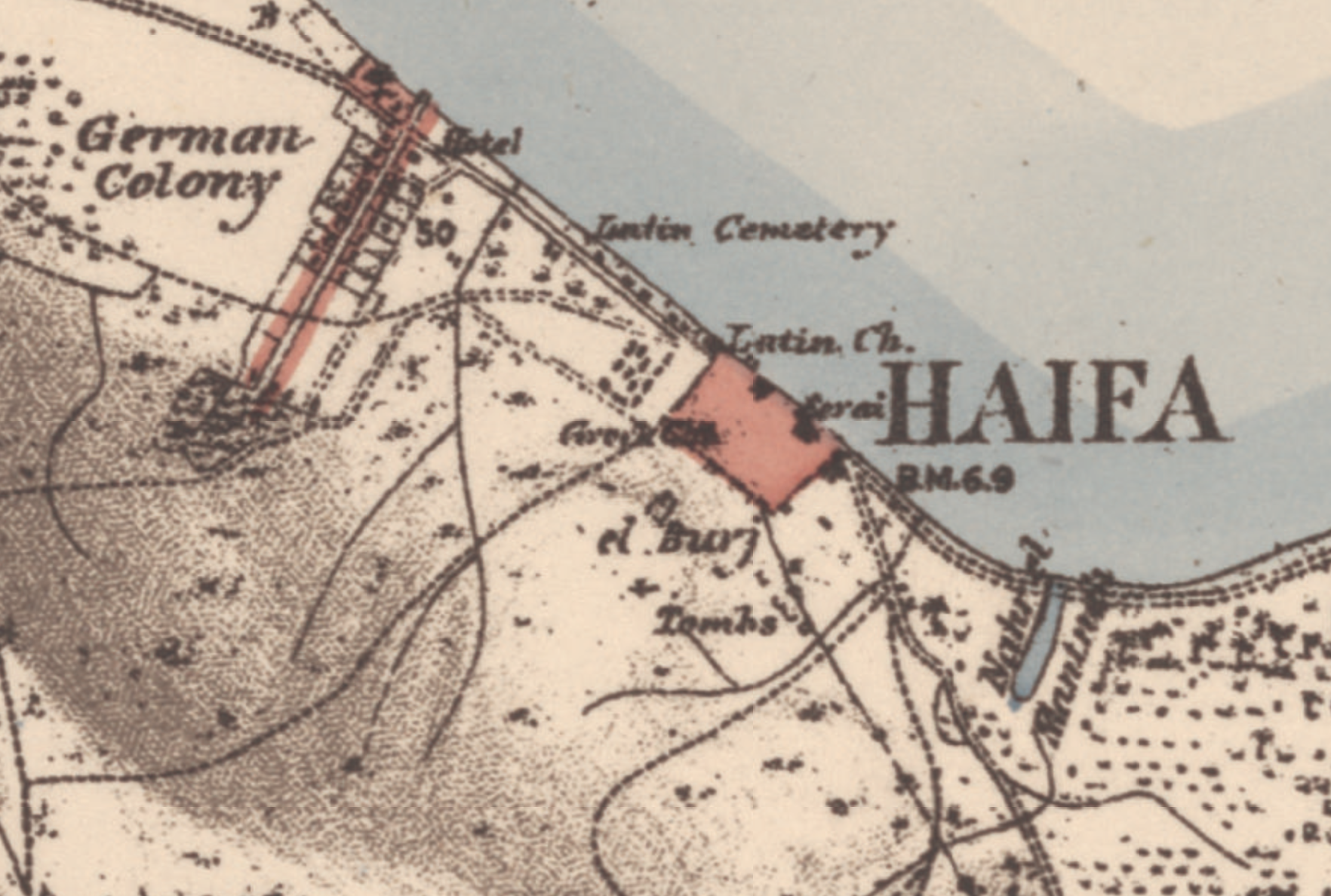
The Old City, just south of the German Colony, in the 1870s (PEF Survey of Palestine)

Zahir al-Umar's relocated settlement was to become the Old City of Haifa. It was fortified with walls, gates, towers and a castle known as Burj al-Salam, and was resettled by both earlier inhabitants and newcomers.

The new town included a central square, mosque, Saraya (government house), and port. Contemporary visitors described it as a small but diverse town with Muslims, Christians, and some Jews living within its walls.

During the 19th century, Haifa expanded beyond its original walls, especially after the arrival of the German Templer community in 1868. The German Colony was established north of the city walls and became the first planned neighborhood in the city.

=== British Mandate ===
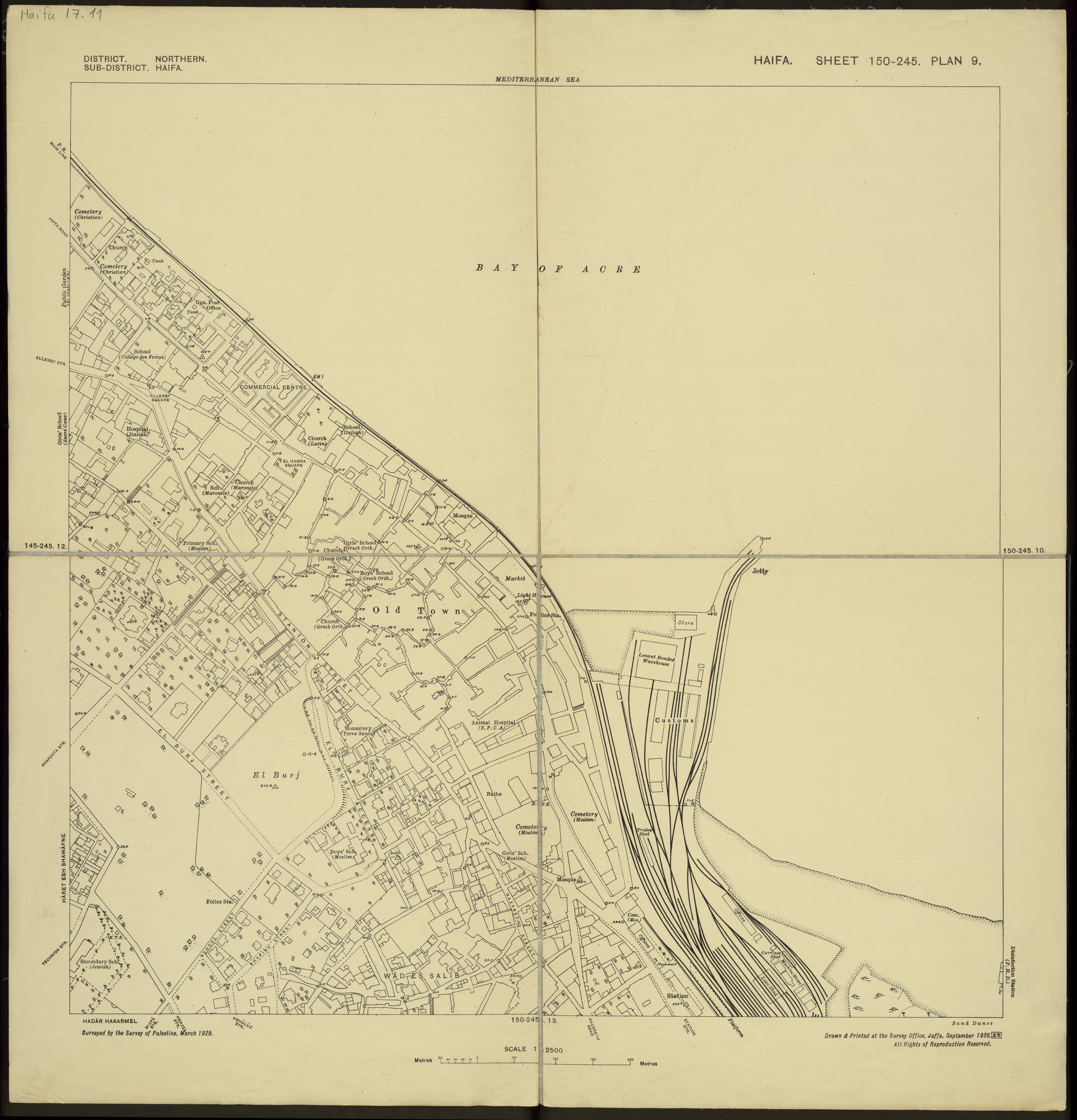
The Old City of Haifa in 1929, in the Survey of Palestine

During the Mandatory Palestine period (1918–1948), Haifa developed into Palestine's major port city. The Old City, known as the Lower Town, remained the hub of Arab civic life, housing markets, mosques, churches, and cultural institutions. The population of Haifa became more mixed, with Jewish neighborhoods expanding on Mount Carmel while Arab residents remained concentrated in and around the Old City. In 1926, the large Al-Istiqlal Mosque was constructed near the Old City's eastern edge.

Immediately prior to the 1948 Palestine war, Haifa had been a mixed city, with roughly equal Jewish and Palestinian Arab populations.

=== Destruction ===
In April 1948, during the lead-up to the end of the Mandate, Haifa was captured by Haganah forces in the Battle of Haifa. The majority of the Palestinian Arab population was displaced, forming a part of the broader 1948 Palestinian expulsion and flight, leaving the city 96% Jewish. According to Ziva Kolodney and Rachel Kallus this "encouraged the new State to demolish the ostensibly deserted Old City, except for the churches and mosques".

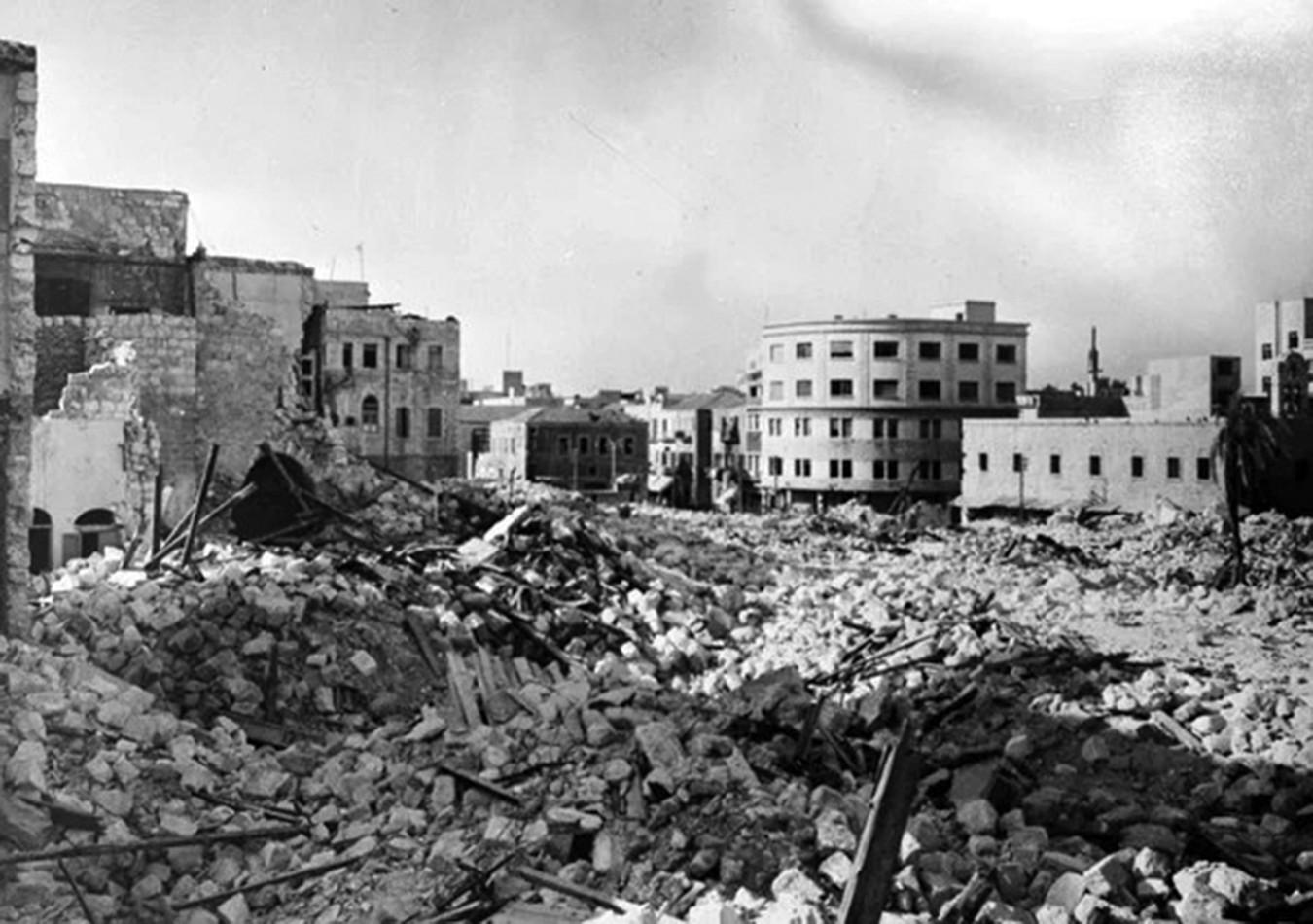
Demolished buildings in the Old Town of Haifa, 1948

The initial demolition was carried out immediately between May and July 1948, while the war continued, on the direct orders of David Ben Gurion. A confidential memorandum from the archives of Abba Hushi (File A1/51:3) with the title "A time to destroy and a time to heal" recommended demolition in order to prevent occupancy of the vacant houses by new Jewish immigrants and returning Arab refugees, and described the rationale as follows:

the exodus of the Arab population from Haifa and the almost complete evacuation of the downtown area and the neighborhoods between downtown and lower Hadar [neighborhood] offer an unprecedented opportunity for conducting preservation work linked to demolition… The designated buildings were damaged during the war and must be demolished according to the dangerous building by-laws. This eases the situation and gives additional reason for the required work.

Following the war, Israeli authorities initiated large-scale demolition of the Old City as part of the "Shikmona Plan", including the destruction of the Saraya, and the traditional housing and markets. Very few structures from the Ottoman and Mandate periods remain today.

== Urban features ==
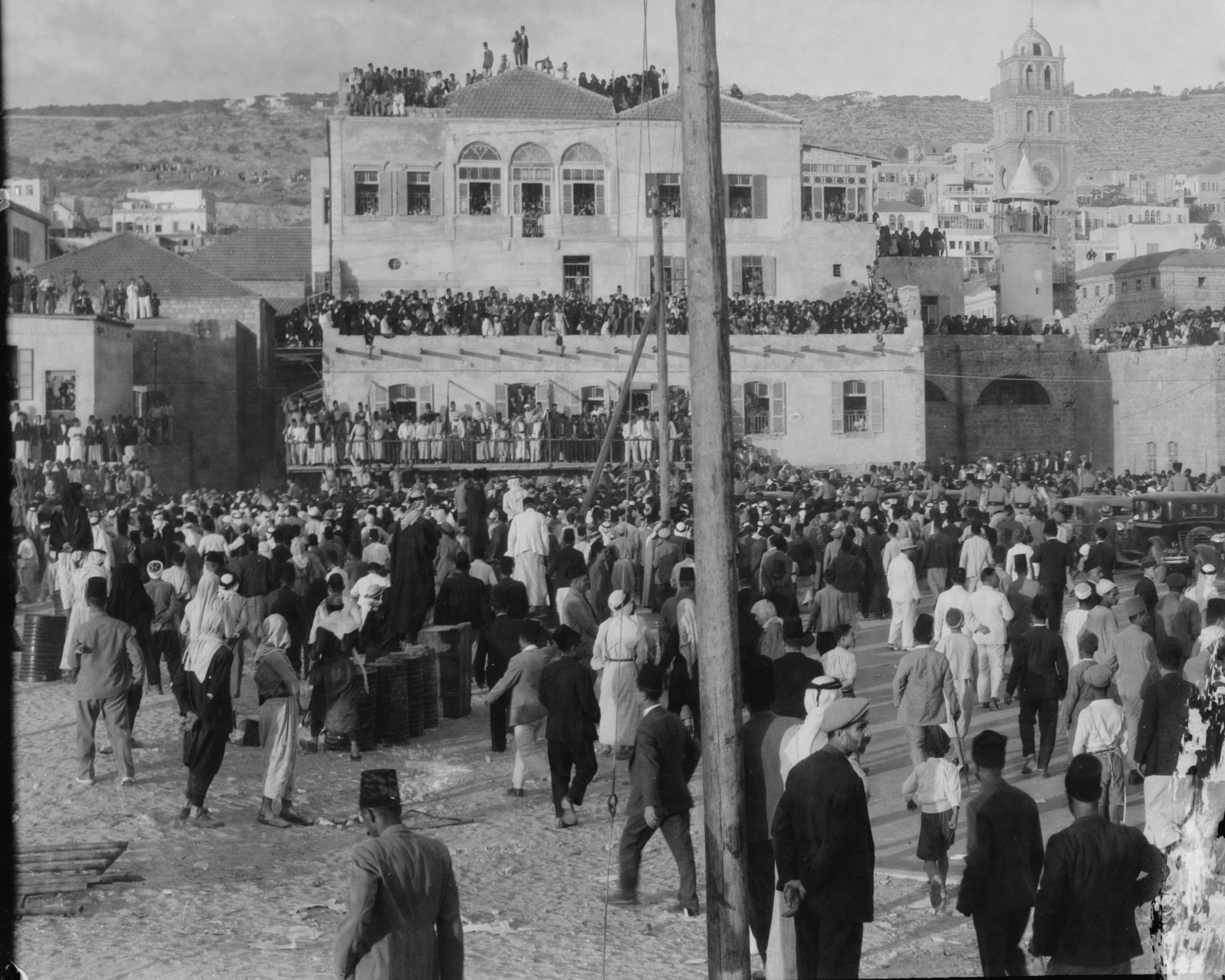
The Old City of Haifa, 14 September 1933 during the funeral procession of Faisal I, in the second-hand market plaza (suq al-‘utaq) in front of the Grand (al-Jurayna) Mosque of Haifa, with its clock tower. The large rectangular building in the upper right-hand corner behind the Grand Mosque is the Haifa Saraya

The Old City had a typical Ottoman urban layout: narrow alleys, central mosque, marketplace, and residential quarters. The city was 125 dunams (31 acres), and divided into three quarters:

- Al-Harat al-Sharqiyya (Arabic: الحارة الشرقية: the Eastern Quarter, 54 dunums), a primarily Muslim quarter. The Harat al-Yehud (Arabic: حارة اليهود: the Jewish neighbourhood) was built on about 11 dunums within this area in the 19th century.
- Al-Harat al-Gharbiyya (Arabic: الحارة الغربية: the Western Quarter, 36 dunums), the Christian quarter. Later called the Harat al-Kanayis (Arabic: حارة الكنائس: the Church Quarter). The western and eastern quarters were divided by a north-south axis positioned along the line of the Al-Jarina Mosque
- The public area (35 dunums), containing the government institutions and some markets

Important structures included:

- The al-Jarina Mosque, built by Zahir al-Umar as the al-Nasr Mosque (Arabic: مسجد النصر, lit. 'Victory Mosque'). The mosque was on the shoreline; on its southwestern side was a public square, which functioned as the centre of Haifa.
- The Istiqlal Mosque
- A cluster of churches in the Harat al-Kanāyis (Quarter of Churches)
- The Ottoman Saraya (destroyed, first for a park and the central post office, later replaced by the Sail Tower)
- Hammams, khans, and coastal souqs (destroyed):
  - Eastern market (mostly destroyed, a small corner remains, called the Turkish Market)

== Legacy ==
Following the demolition, modern buildings and roadways were constructed on the site. Since the 2000s, commemorative initiatives by historians and organizations such as Zochrot have sought to raise awareness of the Old City's history. A few remaining landmarks have been partially restored.

== Gallery ==
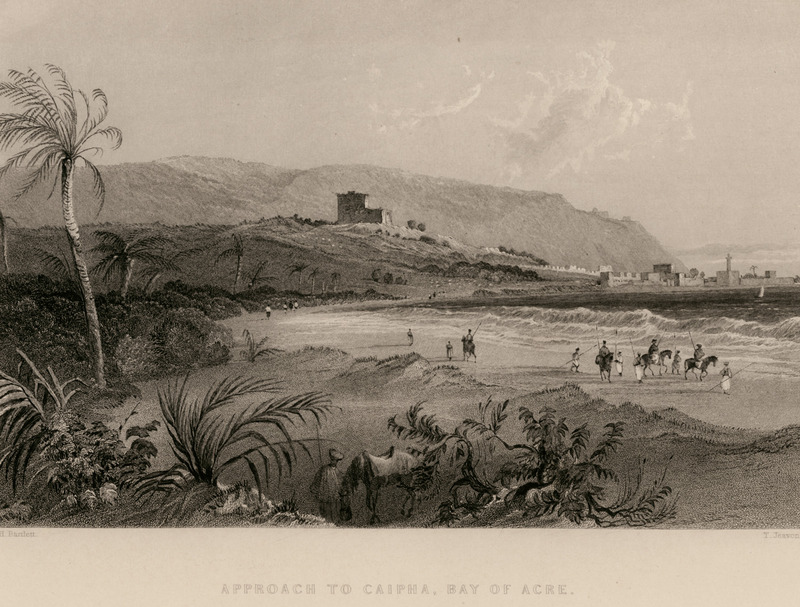
Approach to Caipha, bay of Acre, John Carne, 1836

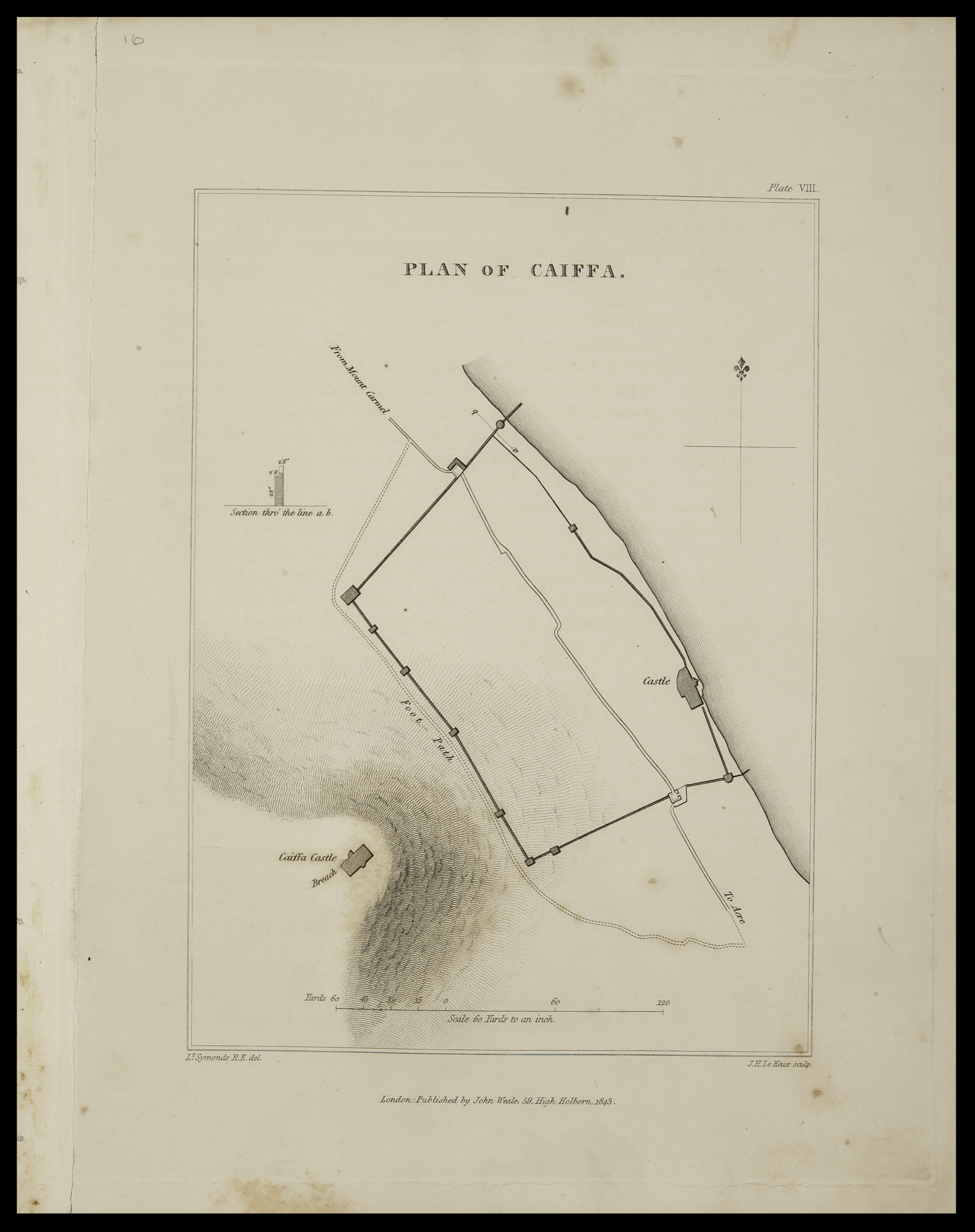
Old City of Haifa measured in the 1840–41 Royal Engineers maps of Palestine, Lebanon and Syria

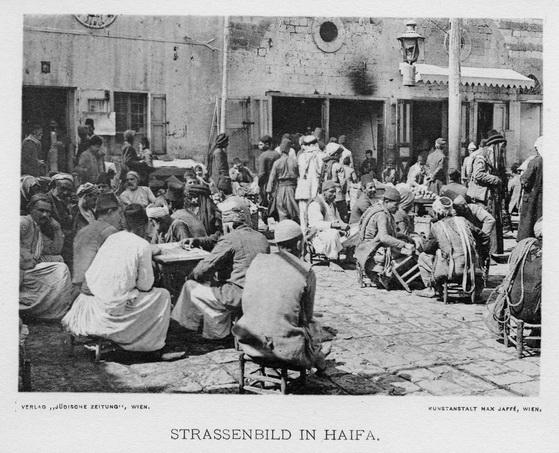
Street scene, 1912

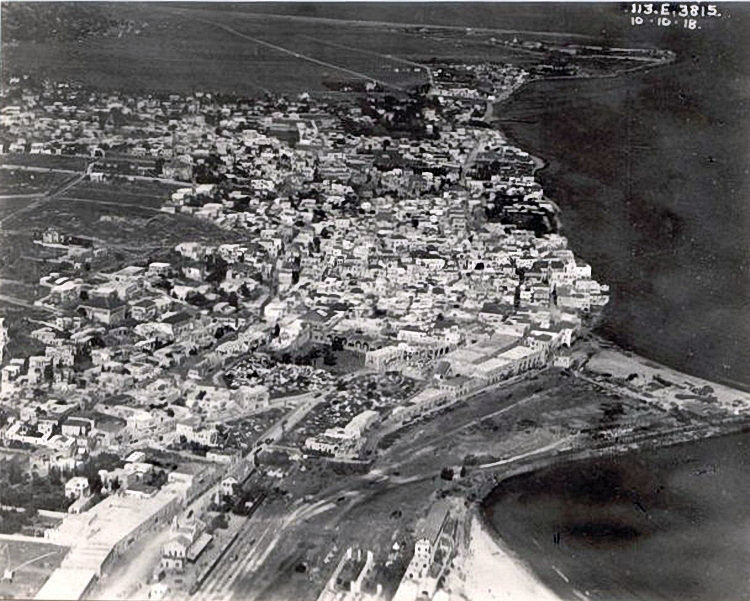
Aerial scene 1918

Haifa in the Survey of Palestine

View of the Old City of Haifa, 1840s, The Holy Land, Syria, Idumea, Arabia, Egypt, and Nubia

== See also ==
- History of Haifa
- Nakba
- 1947–1948 civil war in Mandatory Palestine
- Returning to Haifa

== Bibliography ==
=== Books and journals ===
- Goren, Tamir (1994). "The History of the Disappearance of the "Old City" from the Perspective of Haifa, 1948-1951 / לתולדות העלמותה של "העיר העתיקה" מנוף חיפה (1948-1951)". Horizons in Geography / אופקים בגאוגרפיה (40/41). University of Haifa / אוניברסיטת חיפה: 57–81. ISSN 0334-3774. JSTOR 23703680.
- Goren, Tamir (1999). "Changes in the Design of the Urban Space of the Arabs of Haifa during the Israeli War of Independence". Middle Eastern Studies. 35 (1). Taylor & Francis, Ltd.: 115–133. doi:10.1080/00263209908701258. ISSN 0026-3206. JSTOR 4283985. PMID 22010308.
- Safran, Yair (2015). "Haifa al-Jadida: The Surrounding Walls and the City Quarters". Middle Eastern Studies. 51 (3). Taylor & Francis, Ltd.: 452–461. doi:10.1080/00263206.2014.976623. ISSN 0026-3206. JSTOR 24585899.
- Kolodney, Ziva; Kallus, Rachel (2008). "From colonial to national landscape: producing Haifa's cityscape". Planning Perspectives. 23 (3): 323–348. Bibcode:2008PlPer..23..323K. doi:10.1080/02665430802102815. ISSN 0266-5433.
- Seikaly, May (17 November 2000). Haifa. London: Bloomsbury Publishing. ISBN 978-0-85771-842-6.
- Karkabi, Nadeem; Maoz, Eilat (5 May 2025). "Decolonizing Haifa: Urban Transformation and the Politics of Return". Palestine/Israel Review. 2 (1): 1–18. doi:10.5325/pir.2.1.0008. ISSN 2834-4332.
- Yazbak, Mahmoud (2002). "The Arabs in Haifa: From Majority to Minority, Processes of Change (1870-1948)". Israel Affairs. 9 (1–2): 121–148. doi:10.1080/714003465. ISSN 1353-7121.
- Bshara, Khaldun (20 March 2017). "The Ottoman Saraya: All That Did Not Remain". Jerusalem Quarterly (69): 66. doi:10.70190/jq.I69.p66. ISSN 2521-9731.
- Ben-Arie, Ronnen (4 March 2016). "12: The Haifa Urban Destruction Machine". In Frichot, Hélène; Gabrielsson, Catharina; Metzger, Jonathan (eds.). Deleuze and the City. Edinburgh University Press. pp. 178–192. doi:10.1515/9781474407601-015. ISBN 978-1-4744-0760-1.
- Ben Hilell, Keren; Allweil, Yael (27 July 2021). "Infrastructure Development and Waterfront Transformations: Physical and Intangible Borders in Haifa Port City". Urban Planning. 6 (3): 43–57. doi:10.17645/up.v6i3.4198. ISSN 2183-7635.
- Pringle, Denys (1993a). The Churches of the Crusader Kingdom of Jerusalem: A Corpus: Volume 1, A-K (excluding Acre and Jerusalem). Cambridge University Press. pp. 222–223. ISBN 978-0-521-39036-1.
- Pringle, Denys (1993b). The Churches of the Crusader Kingdom of Jerusalem: A Corpus: Volume 2, L-Z (excluding Tyre). Cambridge University Press. pp. 150–152. ISBN 978-0-521-39037-8.
- Yazbak, Mahmoud (1998). Haifa in the Late Ottoman Period, 1864-1914: A Muslim Town in Transition. BRILL. ISBN 978-90-04-11051-9.
- Carmel, Alex [in German] (30 November 2010). Ottoman Haifa: A History of Four Centuries under Turkish Rule. Bloomsbury Publishing. ISBN 978-0-85771-871-6.

=== Videos and maps ===
- "Video: People and Ruins: Remapping Narrative of Demolished Spaces in Haifa". Religion and Public Life. 4 June 2025.
- "Haifa tour". Zochrot - Haifa tour - Report.
- Bn-Zaydan, Sebastian. "Palestine 1948 Cafés; Returning to Haifa, Mapping the social life of 1947 Haifa Palestine, a city at the brink of colonization". sebastian-bn-zaydan.github.io.
