= Vardiya =

Coordinates: 32°47′37.56″N 34°59′49.63″E

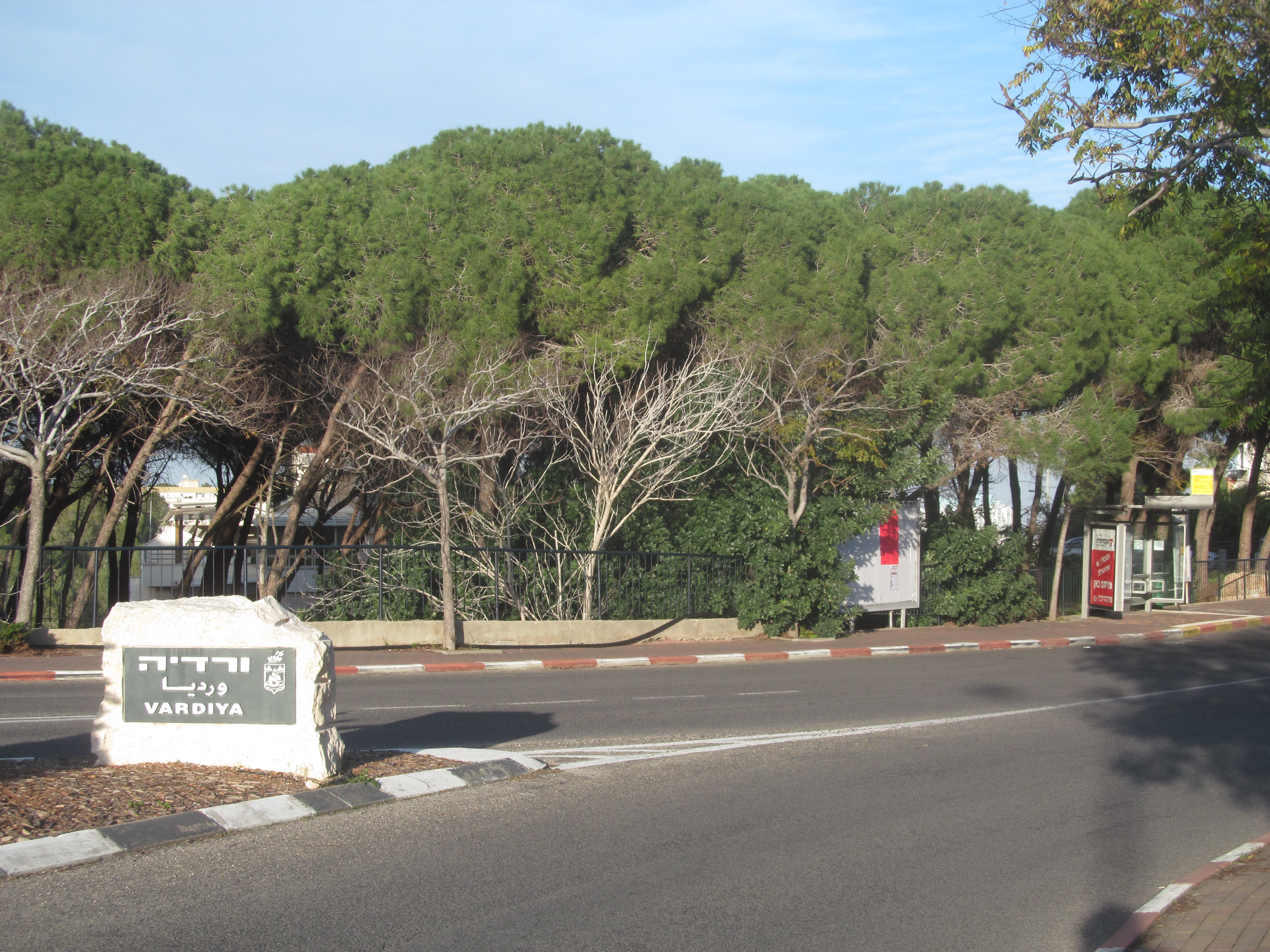
The entrance to Vardiya

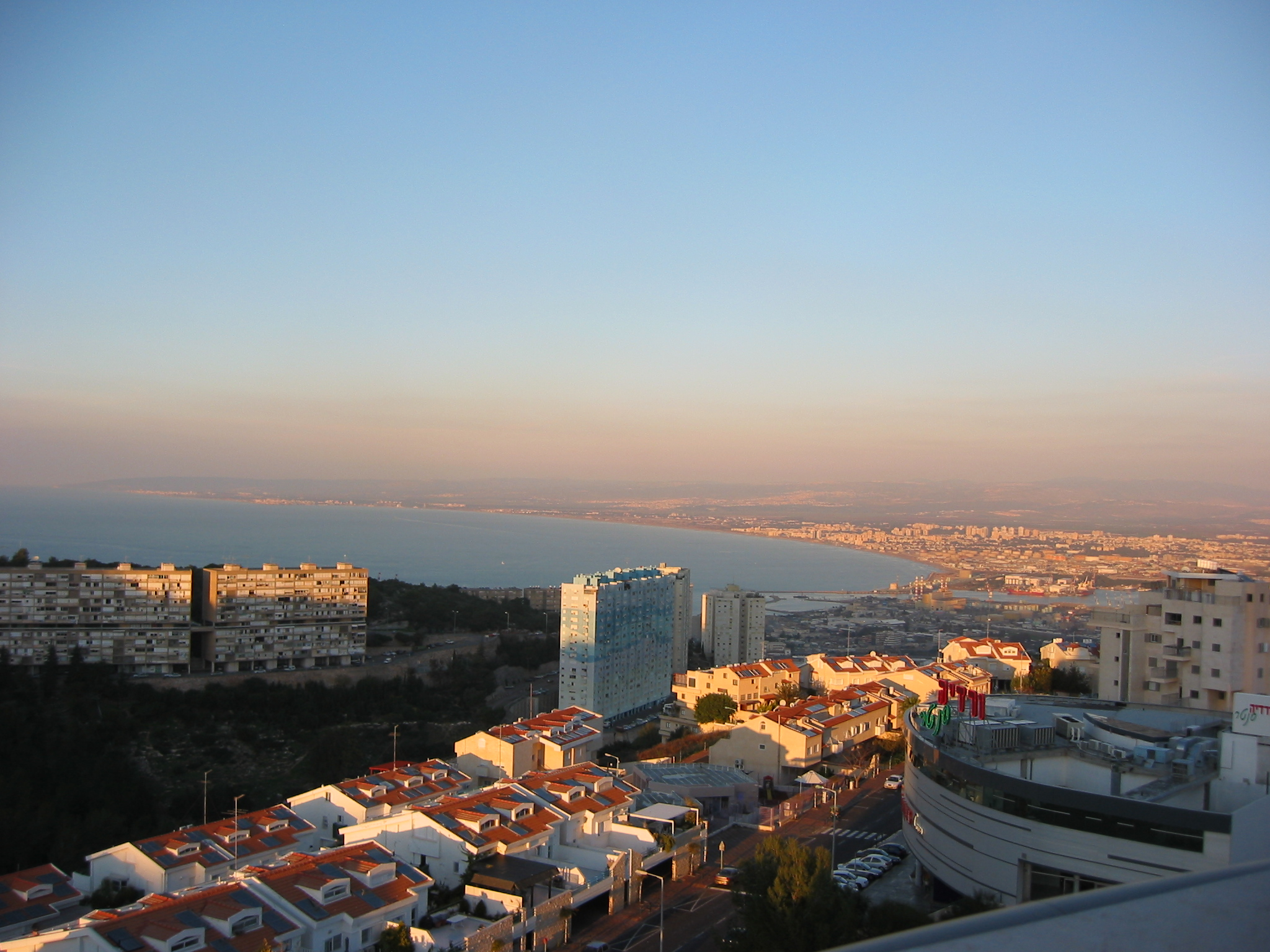
Evening in Vardiya

Vardiya (Hebrew: ורדיה, also Vardia) is a neighborhood in Haifa, Israel.

Established in the 1980s, Vardiya is located in the upper Carmel, between the Hadar Hacarmel and Romema. The pine forests ringing the neighborhood were once a popular site for family recreation and hiking. Several archeological sites and the ruins of stone houses several hundreds years old were discovered on the hills. The residential towers in this largely upscale neighborhood offer a panoramic view of Haifa Bay.

During Operation Desert Storm, a Patriot missile site was deployed in Vardiya.

== See also ==
- Neighborhoods of Haifa
