= Haifa el-Atika =

Neighborhood in Haifa, Israel

Coordinates: 32°49′48″N 34°59′9″E

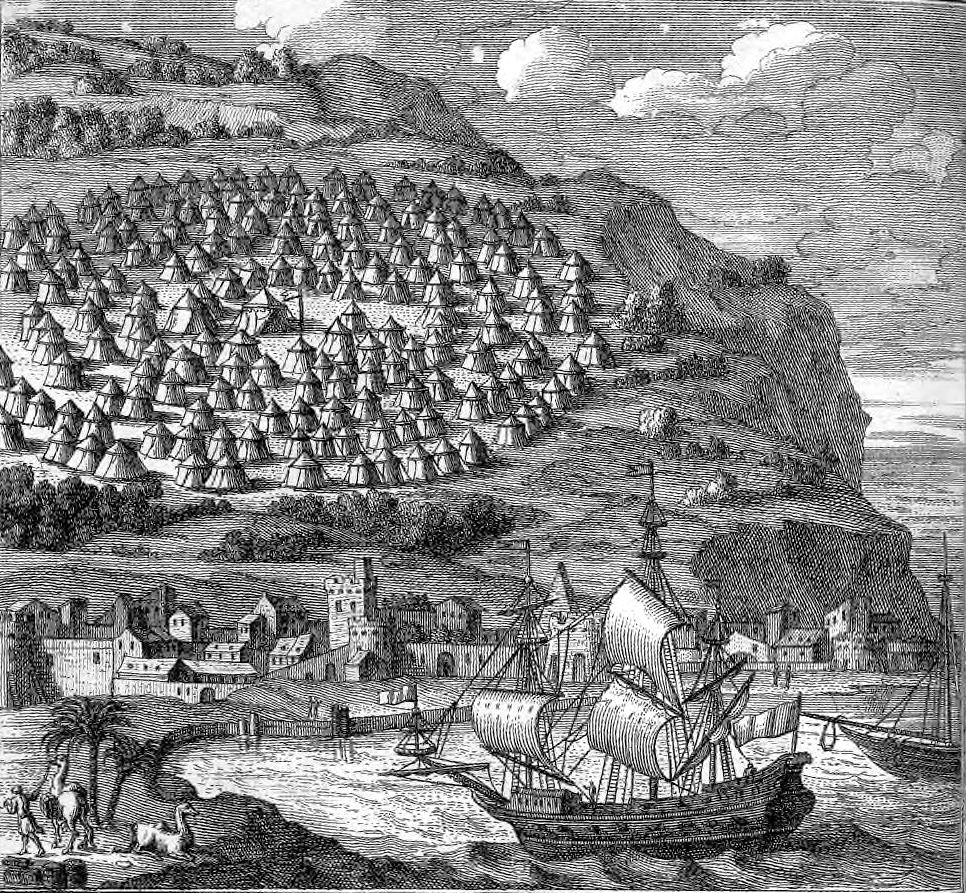
A military camp above Haifa el-Atika in 1717

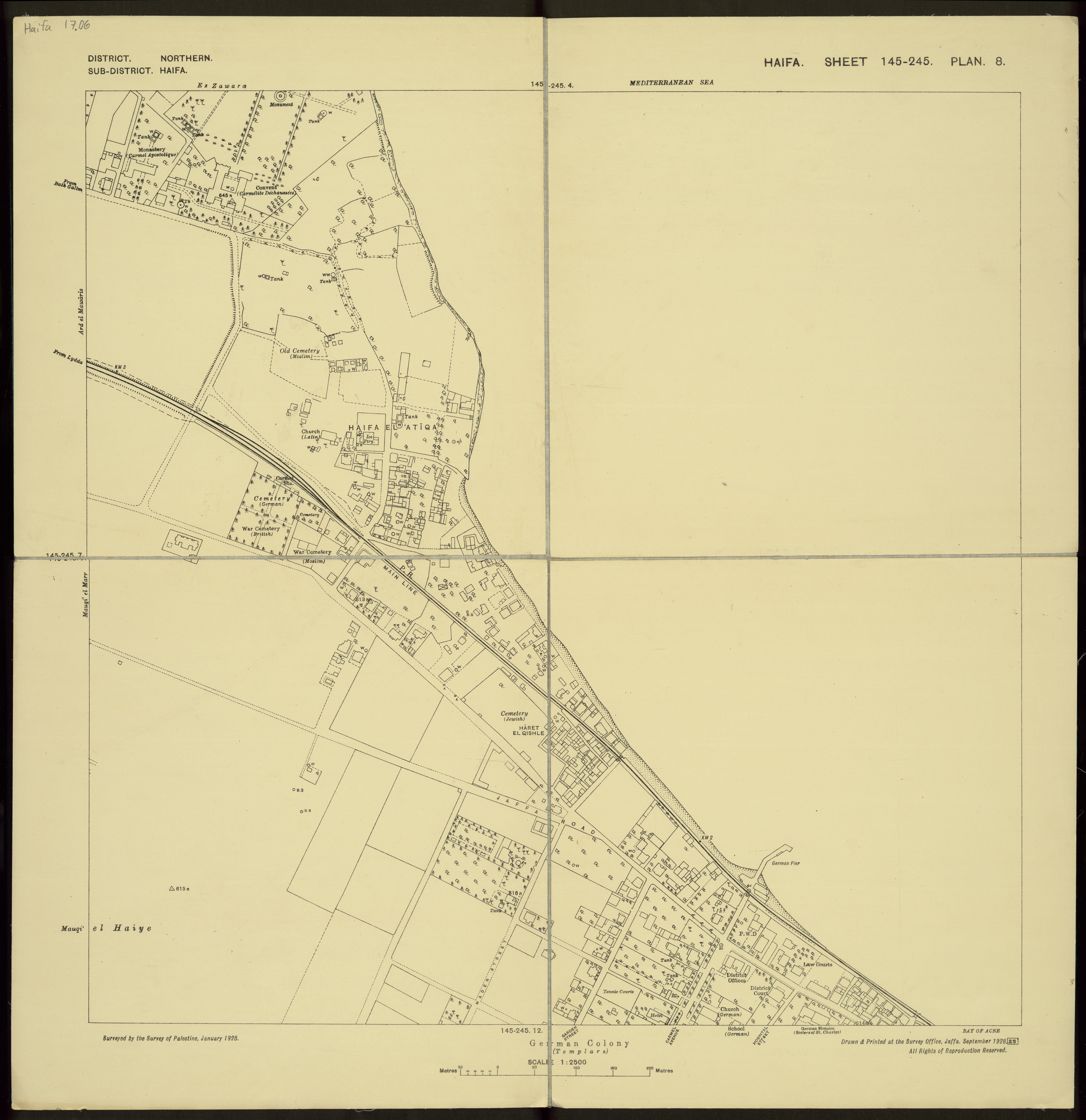
Haifa el-Atika in 1929, in the Survey of Palestine

Haifa el-Atika (Arabic: حيفا العتيقة; Hebrew: חיפה אל-עתיקה; lit. “Old Haifa”), also known as Medieval Old Haifa, is a neighborhood in the central part of Haifa, Israel, and the location of Haifa prior to its resettlement in 1761 by Zahir al-Umar. It is located south of Bat Galim and east of Kiryat Eliezer, not far from the shore of the Haifa Bay.

It lies at an elevation of up to 50 metres, immediately south of the Rambam Health Care Campus, in an area adjacent to Haifa Bay and bounded by Cheil ha-Yam Street and Derekh Yafo. The neighborhood covers an area of 0.16 square kilometres and has no registered permanent population.

== Gallery ==
=== Contemporary maps showing Haifa's location before 1761 ===
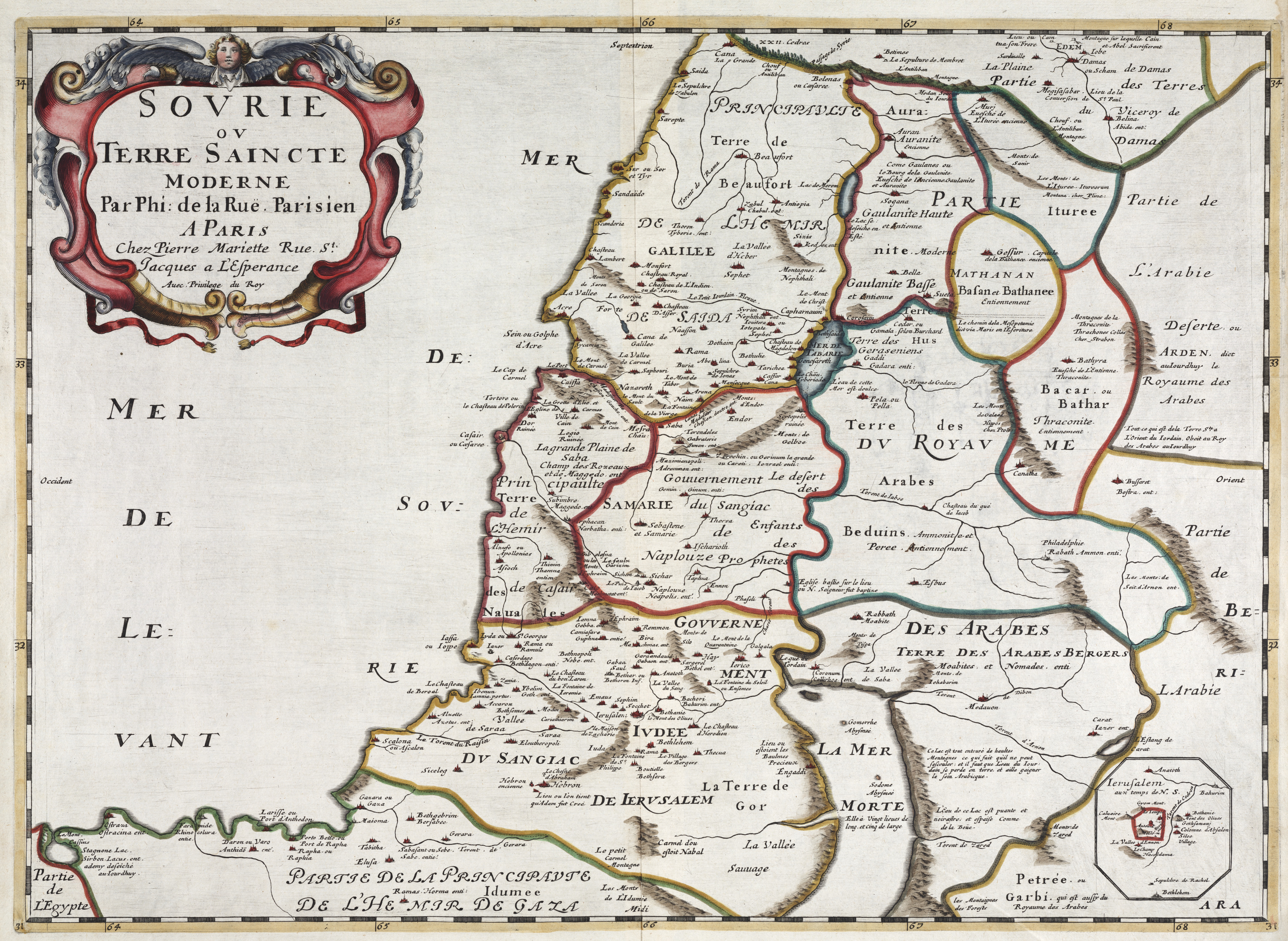
Sourie Ou Terre Saincte Moderne, Philippe de La Rue, 1657

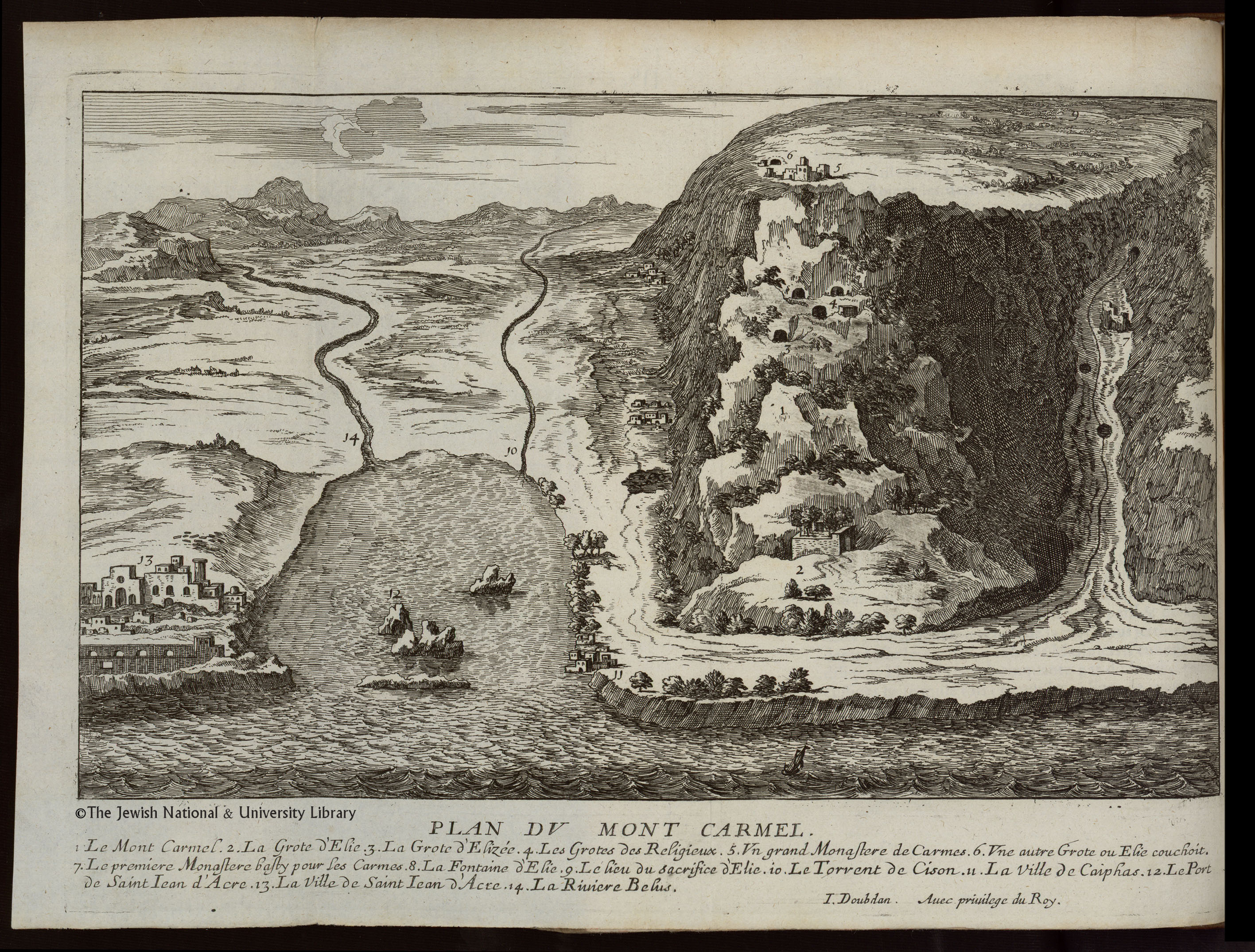
Plan du Mont Carmel, Jean Doubdan, 1666 (Acre is #13 on the left of the bay, Haifa is #11 on the right)

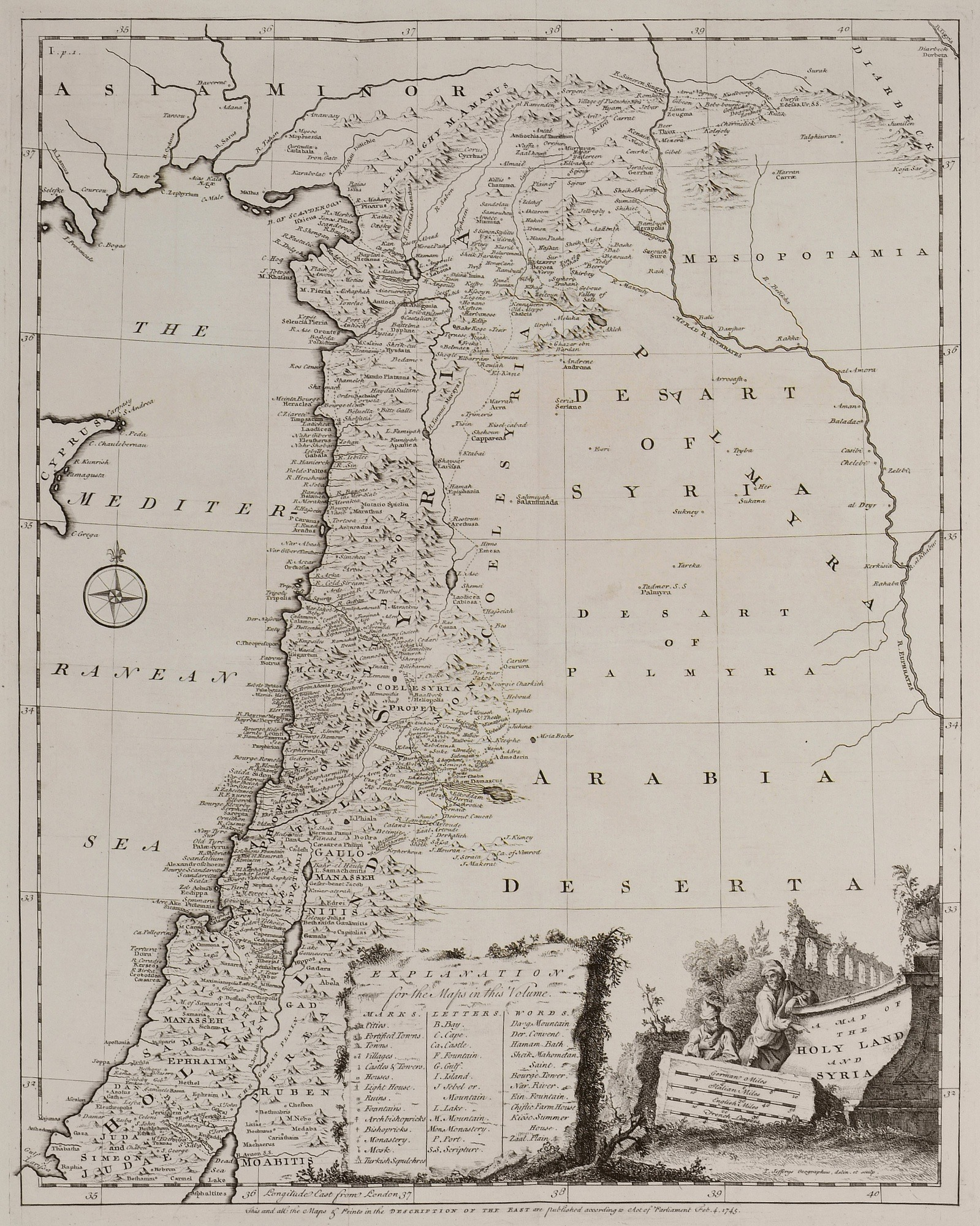
A Map of the Holy Land and Syria, Richard Pococke, 1745

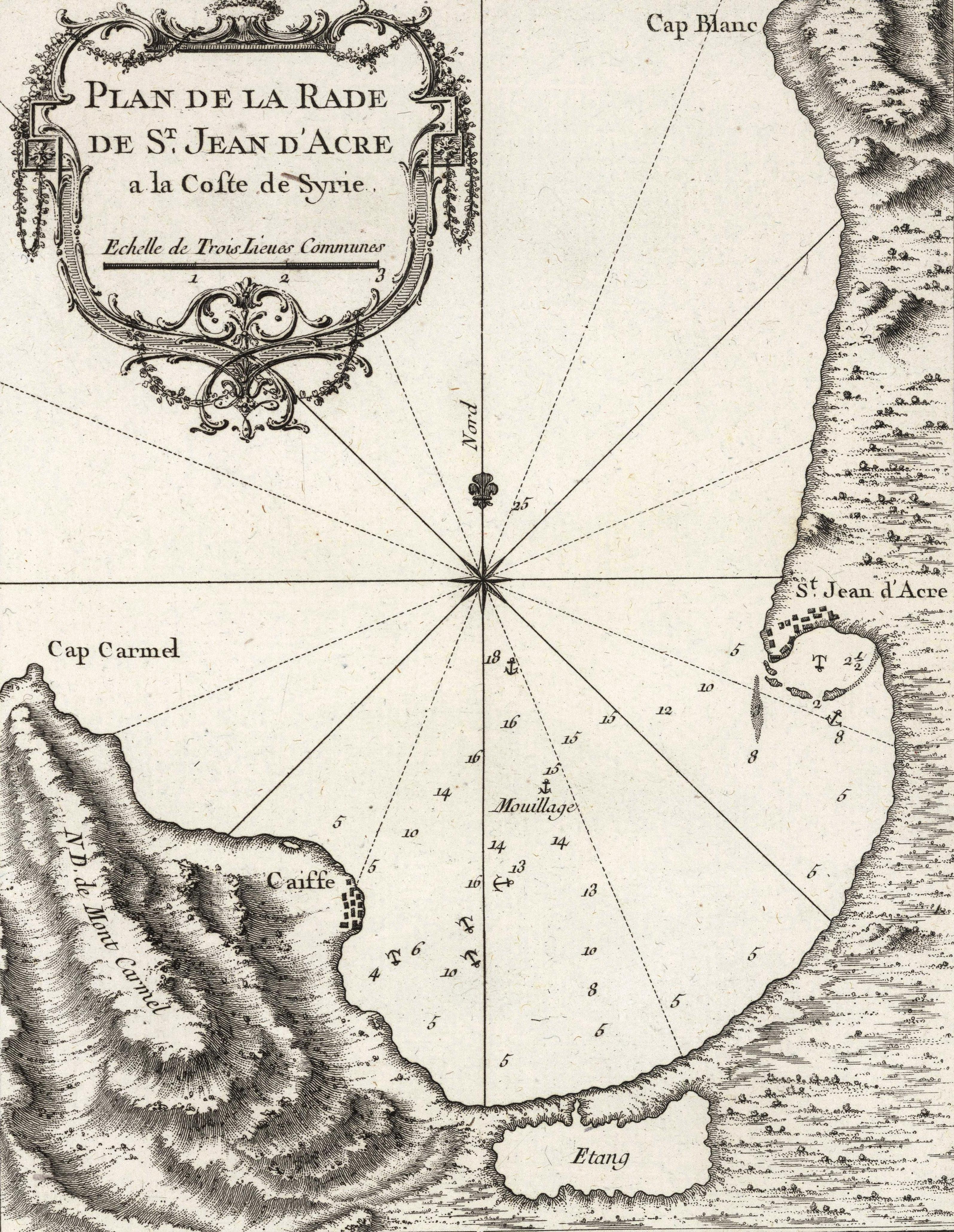
Plan De La Rade De St. Jean D'Acre a la Coste de Syrie, Jacques-Nicolas Bellin, published 1764

=== Later maps showing "Haifa el-Atika" ===
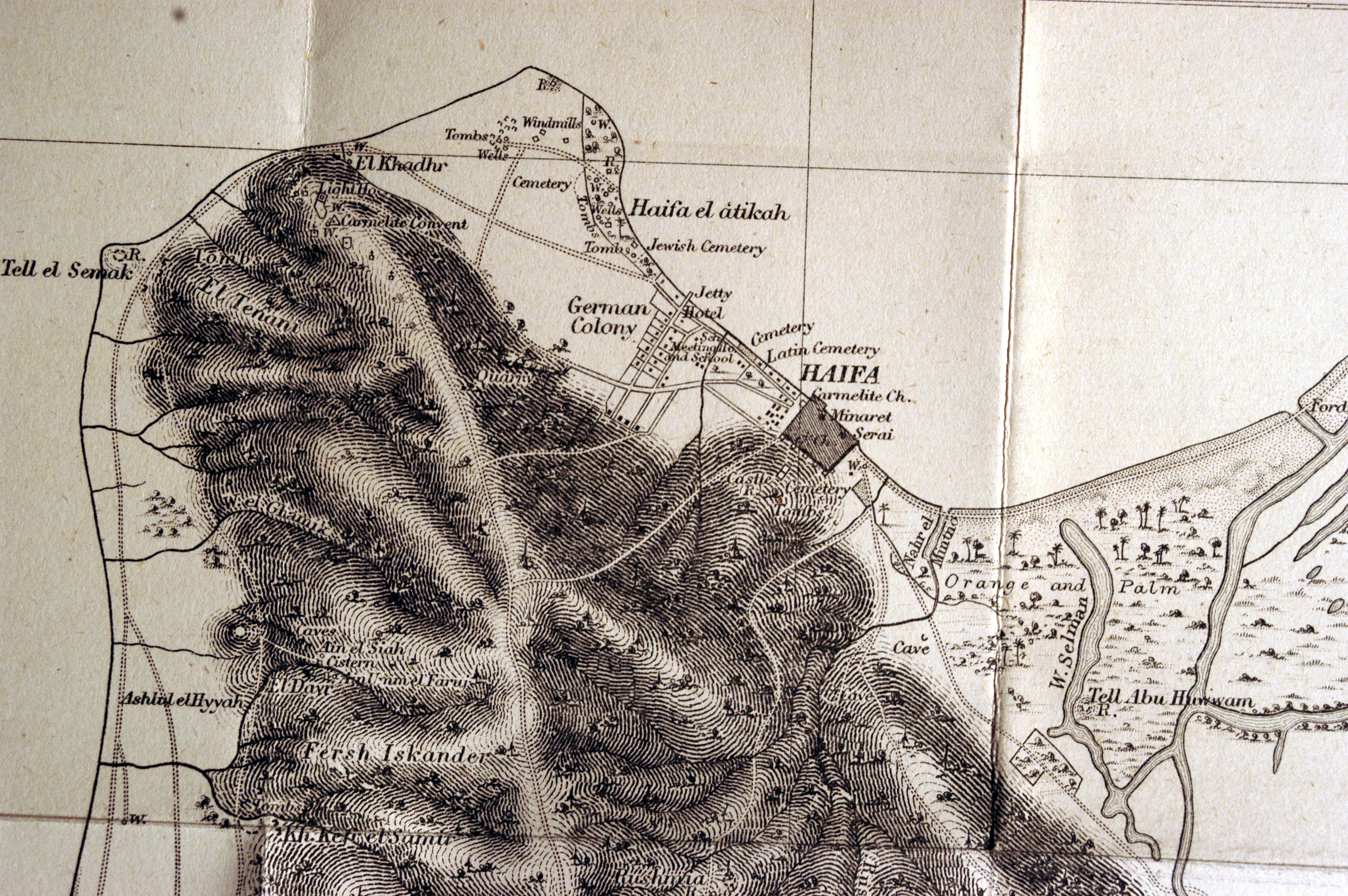
Palestine Exploration Fund, 1875

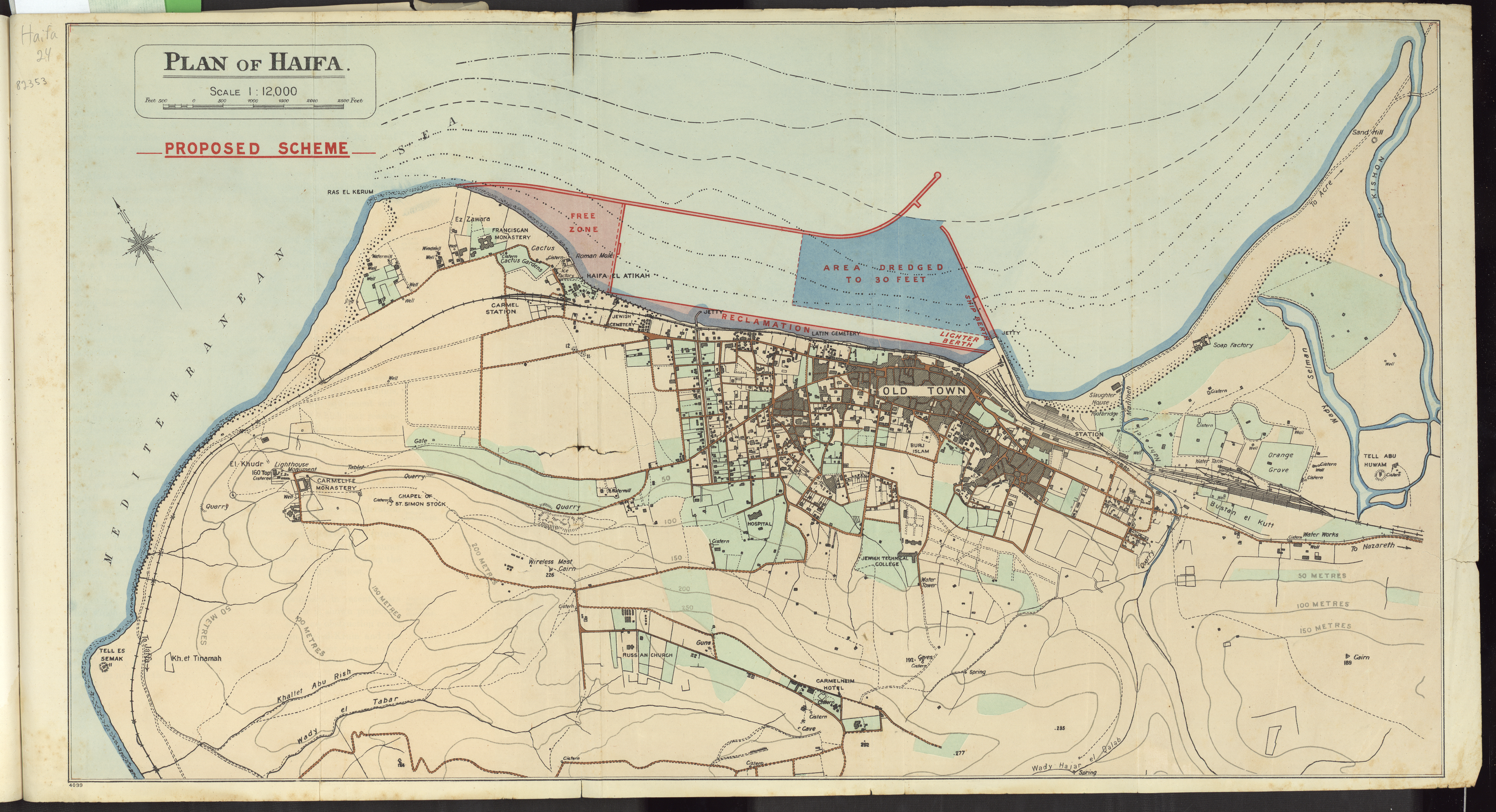
Plan of Haifa, Frederick Palmer, 1923

Survey of Palestine (1:10,000), 1929

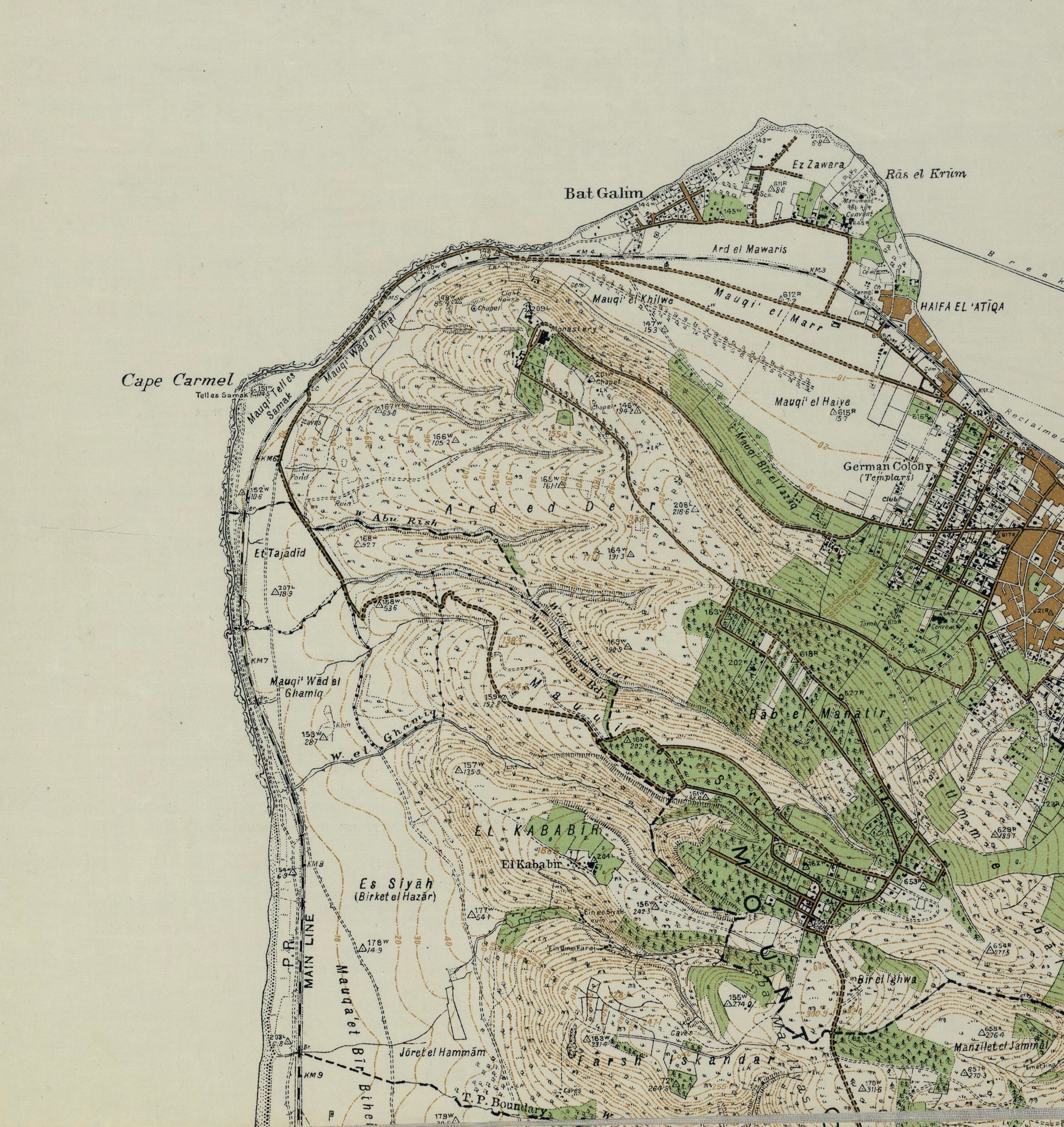
Survey of Palestine (1:20,000), 1932

== See also ==
- Neighborhoods of Haifa
