= Ramat HaTishbi =

Neighborhood in Haifa, Israel

Coordinates: 32°48′50.87″N 34°58′33.93″E

Ramat HaTishbi (Hebrew: רמת התשבי) is a relatively small neighbourhood in Haifa, Israel, located on the western slopes of Mount Carmel, adjacent to the French Carmel neighbourhood. It includes the streets of Hatishbi, Beit El, Shounamit, and Ovadia.
