= Denia, Haifa =

District of Haifa, Israel

Coordinates: 32.767°N 35.002°E

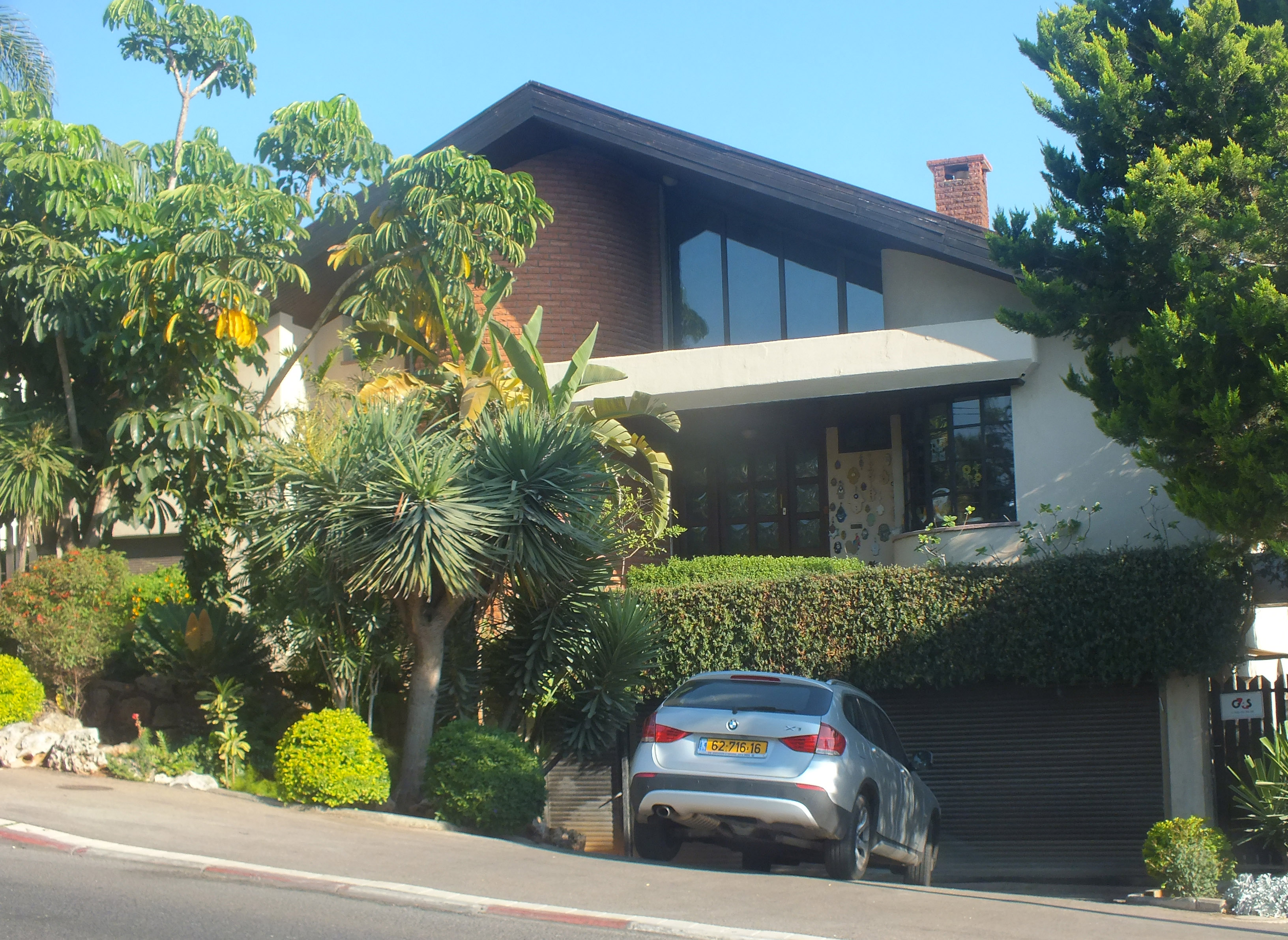
A typical home in Denia A

Denia (Hebrew: דֵּנְיָה; other spellings Danya, Dania, Denya) is a district of Haifa, Israel, located on Mount Carmel. Denia and its associated neighborhoods capture the southernmost part of Haifa's jurisdiction area, which is also the highest-elevated topographically, and make up the city's altogether most affluent as well as least densely populated residential borough, with a population count of slightly more than 11,000 in 2008. It lies approximately 5 kilometers in a beeline from downtown Haifa (whereas twisting roads due to intervening hills and wadis make actual distance bigger) and is crossed by Aba Hushi Avenue, which has made the district sometimes be referred to as the "Aba Hushi Axis". It is bordered by Nesher to the east, Nave Sha'anan to northeast, Ahuza to the north, Tirat Carmel to the west and the Mount Carmel National Park, among which portions of Hof HaCarmel Regional Council are interspersed, to the south. The University of Haifa's main campus, with its identifiable Eshkol Tower, is located in the borough.

As early as the 1930s there were attempts made to develop the then-empty area, which was rugged and wildly wooded, as a part of the Yishuv's strains of extending Haifa southwards whilst exercising environmental and landscape values - which later led to the declaration of the Carmel Park, tightly bordered by the district.

== Name ==
The first houses were built by the Danya Cebus infrastructure company, and the company name's first word was commonly adopted by the neighborhood's settlers; however, the first street, which was named Denia Street, was later decided to be rather attributed to Denmark – in Hebrew sometimes called Danya, and many of the roads whose construction followed also received names of countries and cities with significance to Haifa or Israel, such as Finland Street, Costa Rica Street and Hague Street.

== Denia A and Denia B ==
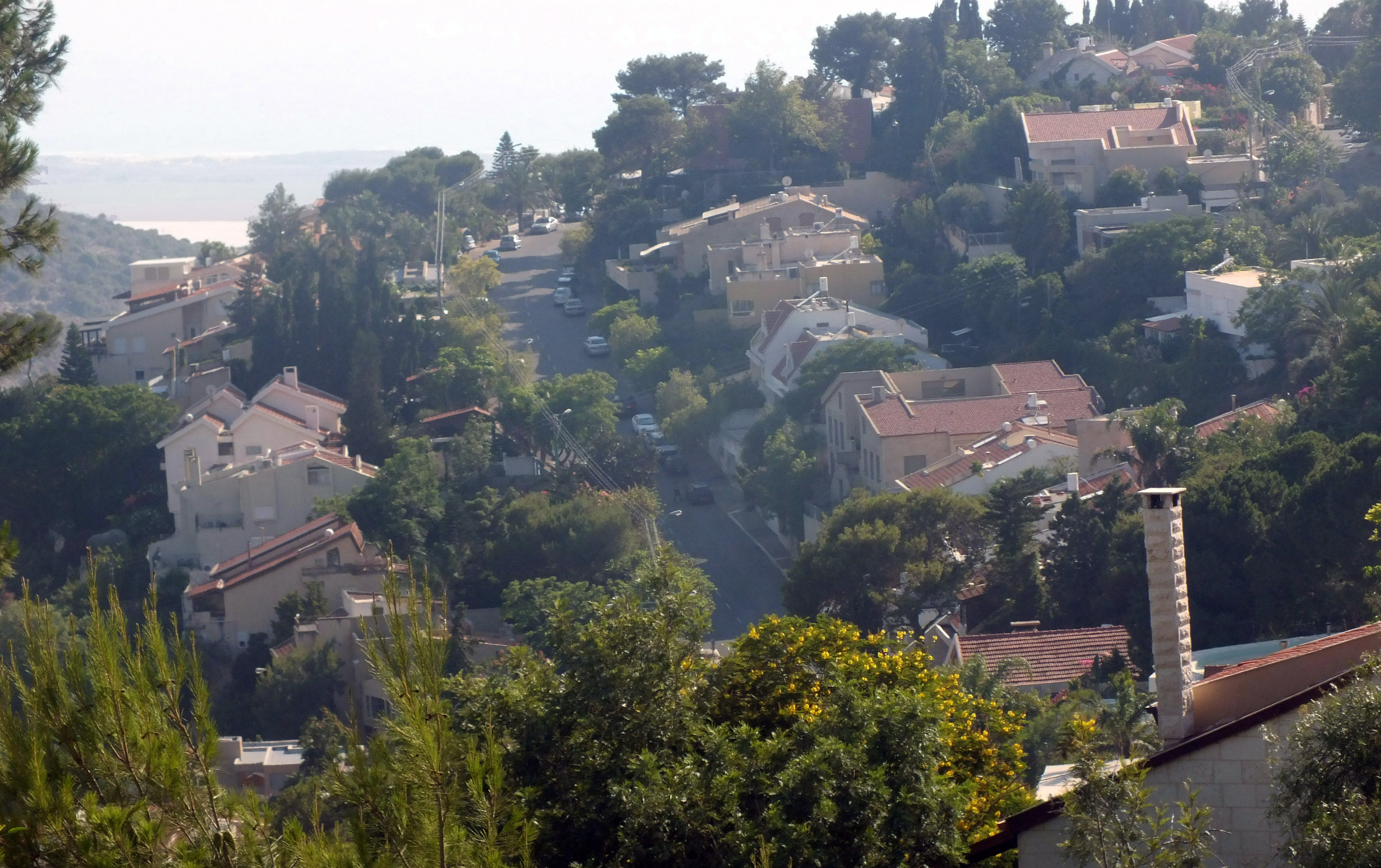
Denya B

The original kernel of Denia, in official references sometimes appearing as "Hod HaCarmel", was established in the early 1960s, to the west of Road 672 which connects Haifa with Daliyat al-Karmel (later named after Mayor Aba Hushi), and the new neighborhood was actually so remote that it had no built-area continuity with any other existing community. The failed initial prospect of attracting military officers as residents was replaced by the explicit attempt of creating a millionaire-suburbia at the forest's doorstep, giving rise to the city's wealthy families beginning to buy the exceptionally large lots on which ambitiously designed properties were built, frontaged by spectacular gardening. In 1971, a decade after the plan for the first neighborhood was made, the authorities gave a green light to a part-two to be built westward down the same mountain ridge extension. This younger neighborhood, consisting overwhelmingly of duplexes and houses with backyard swimming pools, is the most secluded of neighborhoods, with the older Denia (now known as "Aleph", or A) as a sole access to and from the main road. The extreme-western houses coincide the town of Tirat Carmel; however, the residents have objected the suggested construction of a road that would connect them with that low-rated town. Surrounded by lush wadi gorges from three directions, Denia Beth (or B) has a country club and a considerable share of its population are employees of the IT research and development hubs of southern Haifa.

As of the 2000s, demographic data suggest that Denia A's inhabitants mean age is one of the highest in the borough and in Haifa. The two neighbourhoods share a small commercial centre, as well as a community centre and a public library.

== Ramat Golda and Ramat Almogi ==
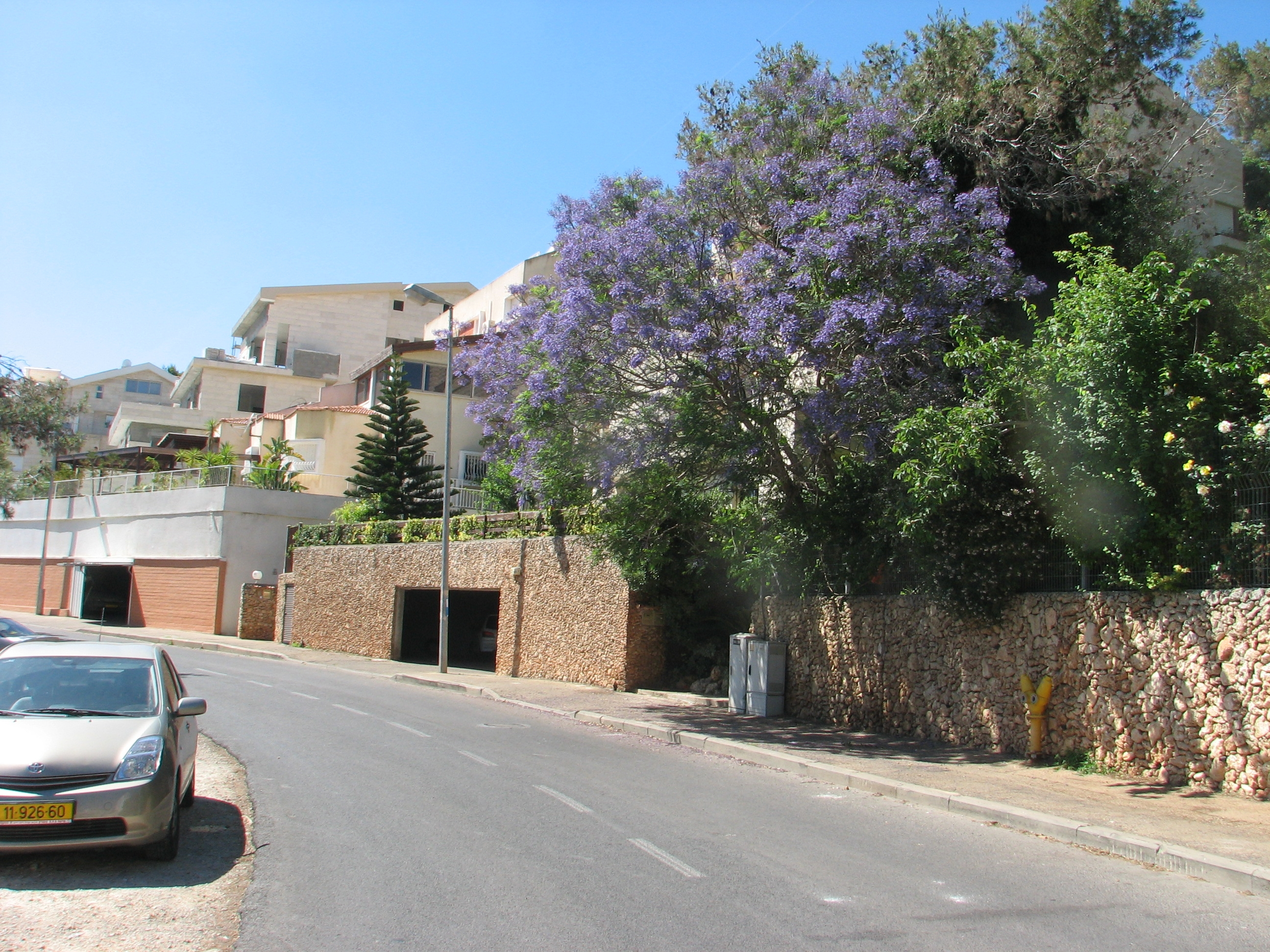
Ramat Golda

The cluster of neighborhoods that constitute the greater Denia also in many senses includes the twin-communities of Ramat Golda ("Golda Height") and Ramat Almogi ("Almogi Height") – named respectively after Israeli Prime Minister Golda Meir and Haifa mayor Yosef Almogi. Ramat Golda, the older of the two, was built mainly during the 1980s, adjacent to Road 672, and is appreciated for its unobstructed westward view to the Mediterranean. Parallelly stretching on the eastern bank of the highway, the construction of Ramat Almogi was commenced in mid-1990s and has continued into the 21st century, with more multiple-tenant units and condominiums, rare to Denia's older parts. It typically attracts younger families.

== Ramat Aba Hushi ==
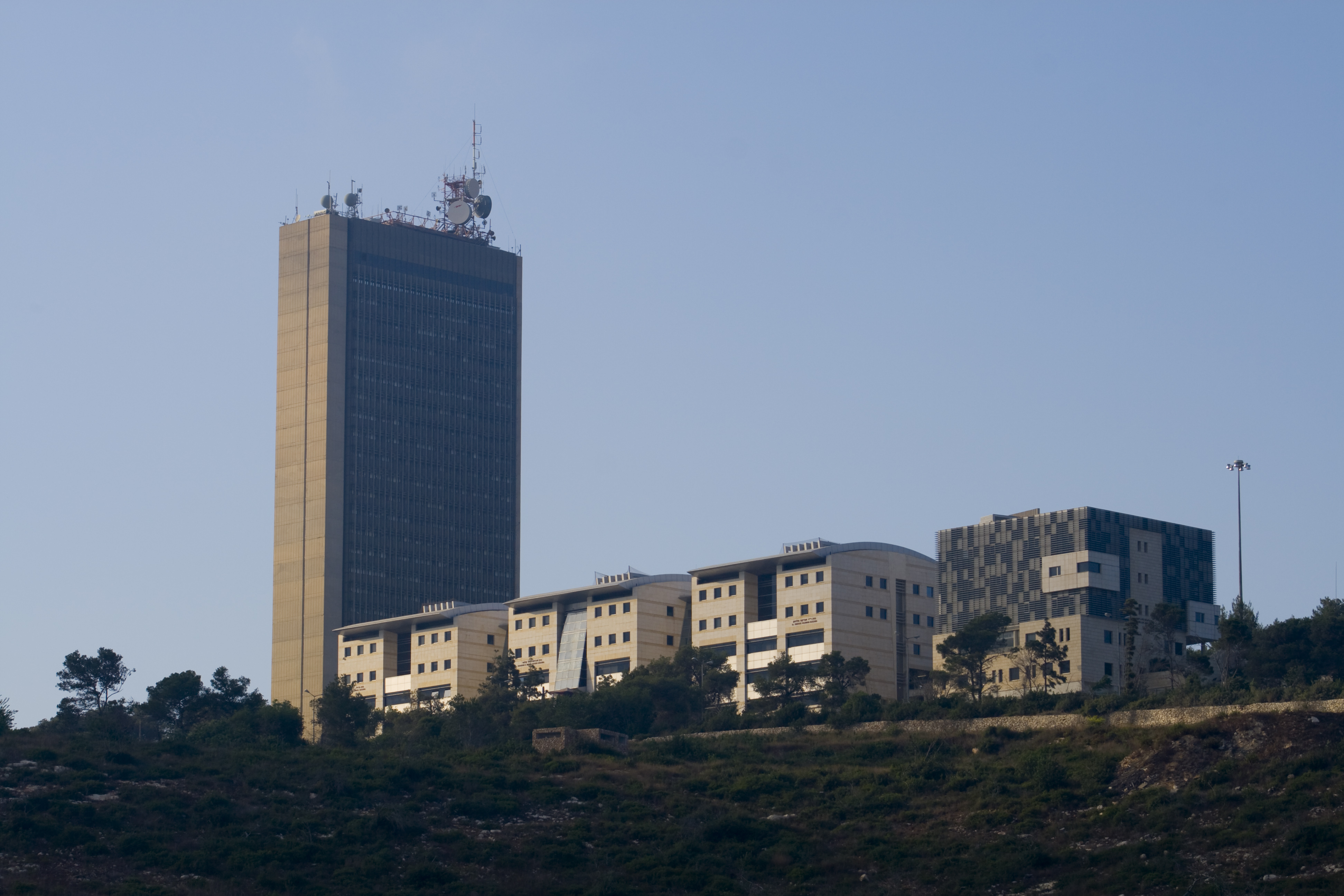
Haifa University located in the south-east of Denia

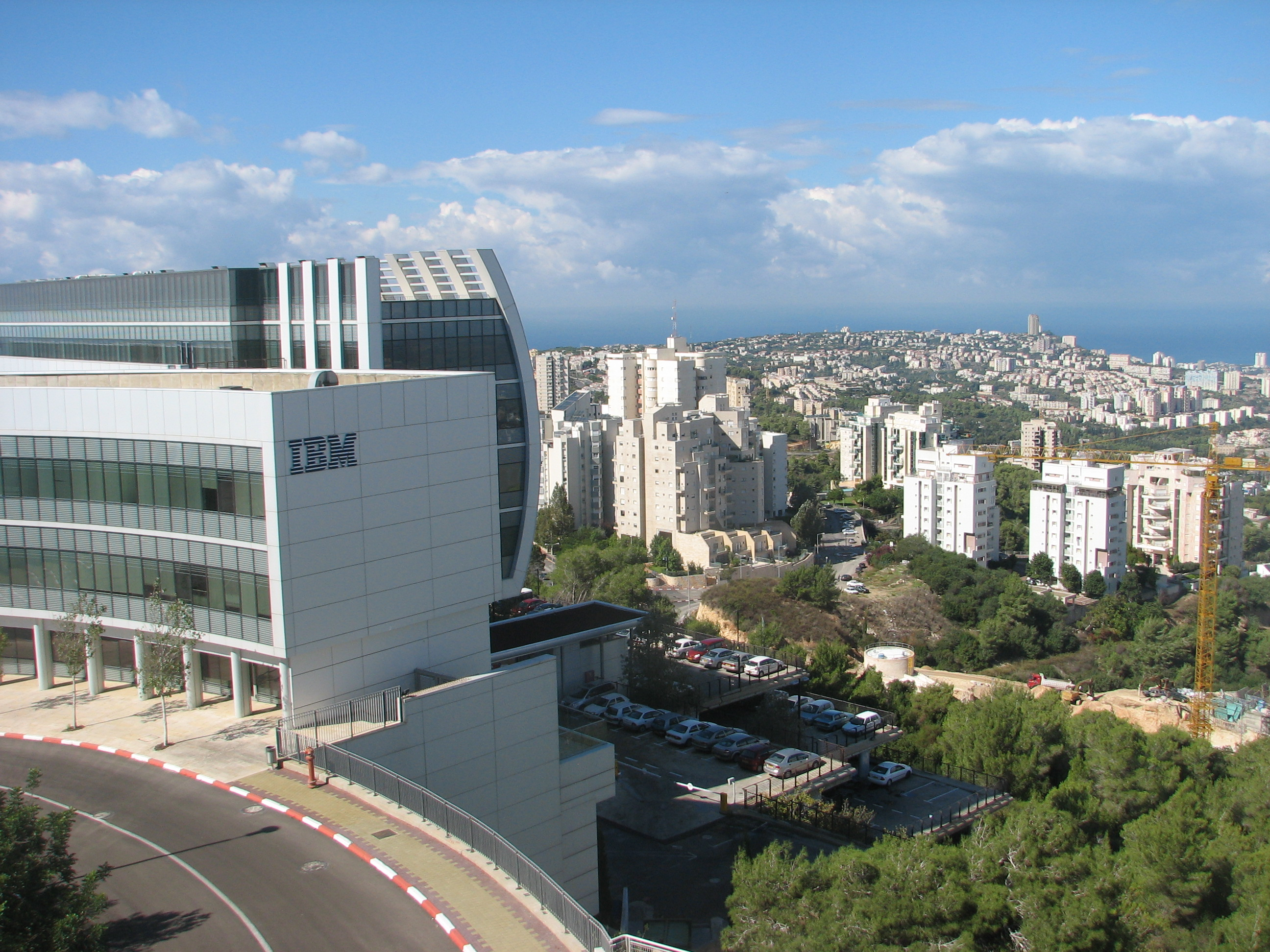
IBM Haifa Research Laboratory

With its denomination as "Aba Hushi Height" (Ramat Aba Hushi), at 470 meters above sea level this area of about 1.5 kilometers north-south along the main artery is today home to the campus of the Haifa University. Back in the early 70s, when the area of the Carmal National Park had just been demarcated by the state leaving the outlines of Haifa's jurisdiction sharply coinciding the newly built Denia, it was then-mayor Aba Hushi who managed to redeem a narrow strip from the park-assigned woodland on Mount Tlalim back into within the city's borders, and expropriated it from its recreational designation in order to found Haifa's second university, the first being the Technion in Nave Sha'anan. Today, this section is mainly a commuting hub for the school's over-17,000 students and staff as well as citizens frequenting the various amenities, such as Israel's largest academic library, with only residents being the students who stay at the dormitories located at the campus’ southeastern tip. To the north of the campus is the venerable IBM Haifa Research Laboratory.

== Savionei Denia ==
Savionei Denia ("Denia Ragwort") is one of Haifa's very few residential tower neighborhoods, as well as one of the city's newest, with prestige highrises that have been erected east of the Aba Hushi thoroughfare since the 1990s onwards. The buildings, with large apartments overlooking the Haifa Bay, are set on a steep forest slope that has been heavily thinned out, north of the university, and those of them that reach farther east are eventually met by the identical tower blocks of the city of Nesher.

== Schools ==
Pupils from the borough are regularly registered for the Albert Einstein Elementary School, which is situated just at the border of Ramat Almogi and Ahuza; and later for the Rothschild–Aliance High School, at the border with Nave Sha'anan.

The Albert Einstein Elementary School was founded in 1977. It has 545 students enrolled in grades 1-6, with teaching team that includes 33 teachers and 4 administrators. The school contains a library, computer lab, English training lab, mathematics lab, gym and science laboratory.

The school is central part of the local community and is the site of annual gatherings and festivals as well as the local Independence Day festival. The Ministry of Education and the local municipality regulate the school's curriculum and provide it with administrative support.

During the wave of migrants from the former Soviet Union to Israel in 1990-1993, the Einstein school was pivotal in absorbing new migrant children in the southern neighbourhoods of Haifa.

== Notable residents ==
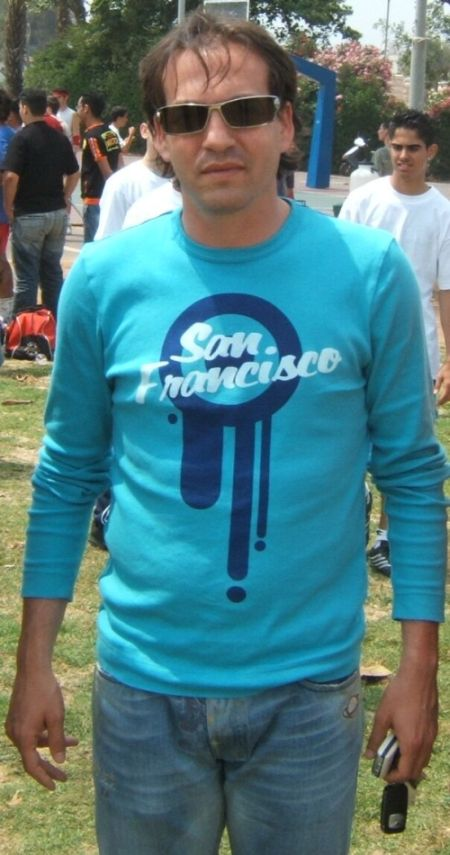
Eyal Berkovic

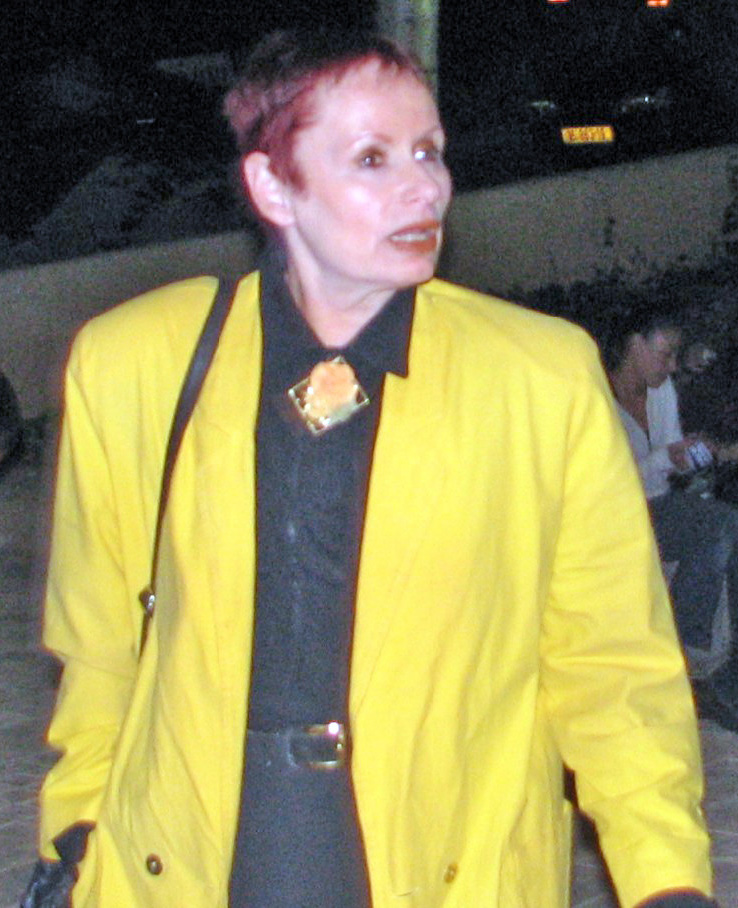
Professor Aliza Shenhar

- Yona Yahav, Mayor of Haifa
- Yael Rom, first female pilot of the Israeli Air Force
- Aliza Shenhar, president of the Max Stern Emek Yezreel College
- Danny Katz, youth whose unresolved murder affair generated a national and international interest
- Robi Shapira, businessman and owner of Hapoel Haifa F.C.
- Moshe Shahal, Member of the Knesset
- Eyal Berkovic, footballer
- Dan Shechtman, Nobel laureate scientist
- Eli Guttman, manager of Israel's national football team

== See also ==
- 1989 Mount Carmel forest fire
- 2010 Mount Carmel forest fire
