= Romema (Haifa) =

Neighborhood in northern Israel

Coordinates: 32°47′12.76″N 34°59′42.84″E

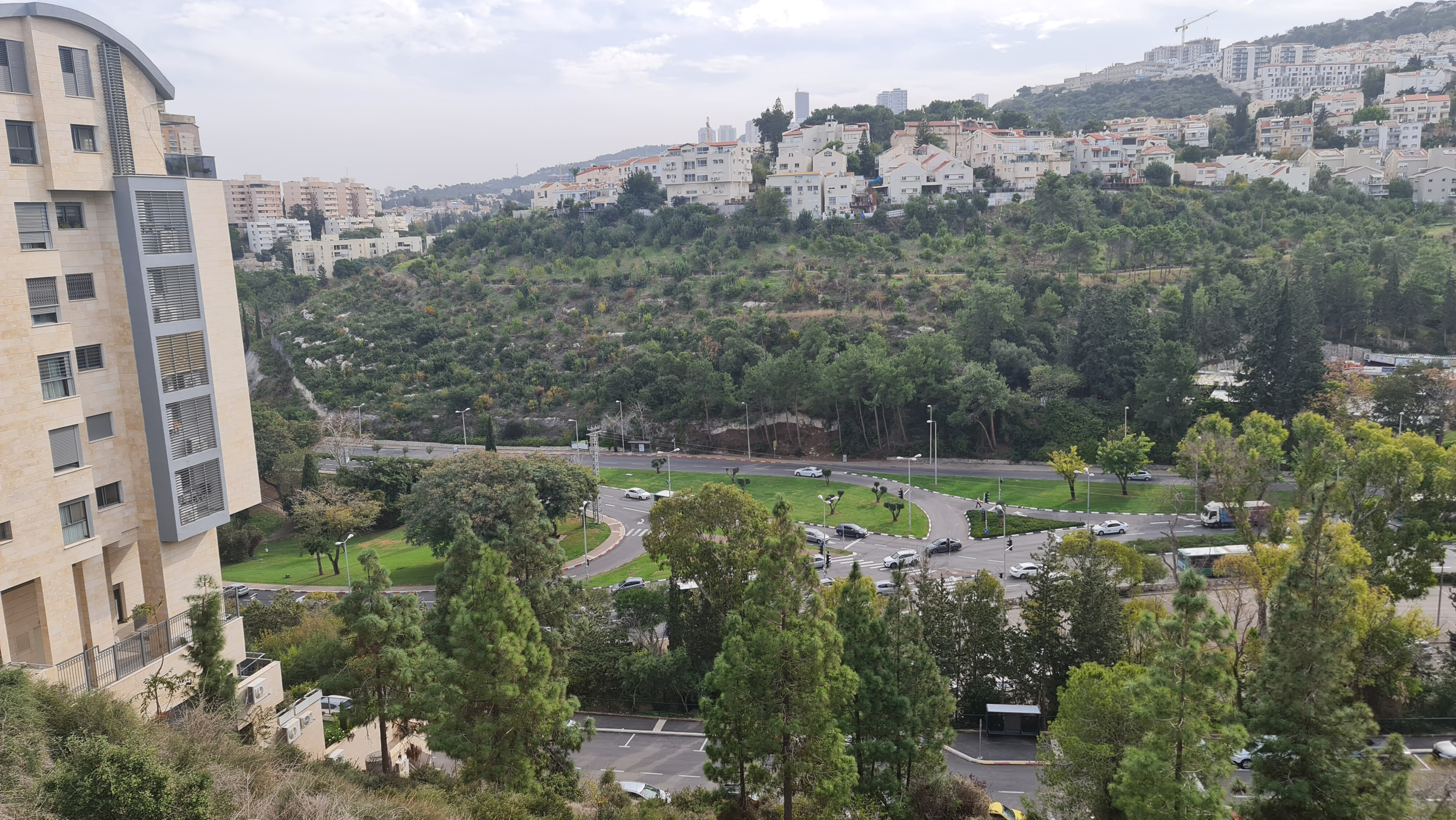
Romema, Haifa

Romema (Hebrew: רוממה) is a neighborhood in the city of Haifa, Israel. Also known as The Romemot and Ramat Ben-Gurion, it is located east of Ahuza, on the northern slope of Mount Carmel. Today the neighborhood has two sections - New Romema and Old Romema - with a joint population of 8,340.

== Etymology ==
Rushmiya comes from a personal name.

== History ==
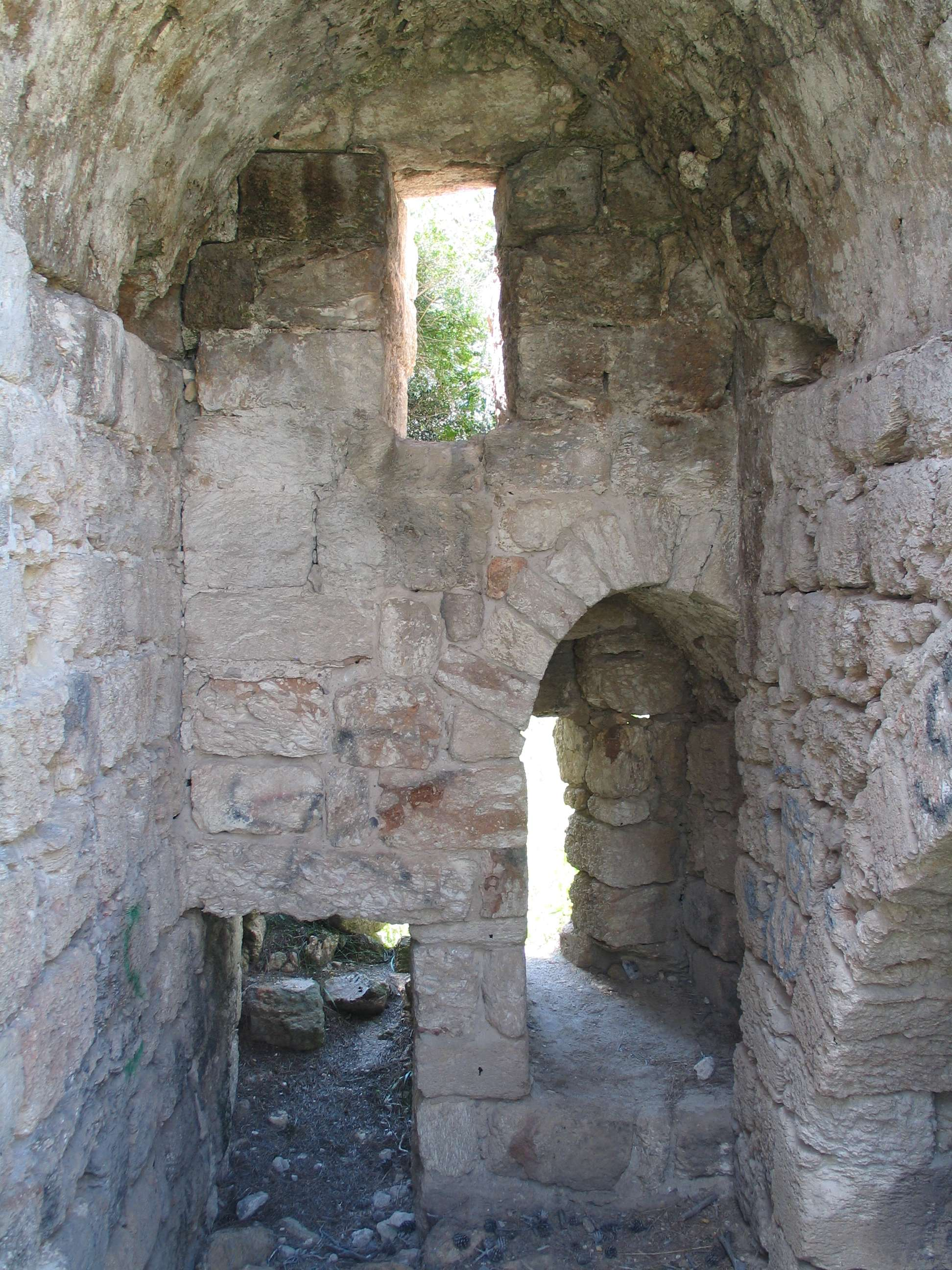
Khirbet Rushmiya ruins in Romema: interior of fore building of the Crusader tower.

Remains from the Persian, Hellenistic, Hasmonean, late Roman, Byzantine, Ayyubid and Crusader era have been found here.

=== Crusader period ===
During the Crusaders period, the settlement was surrounded by a wall, and a fortress was built in the centre. It was held by the Frankish settlers from 1099 to 1187.

It was again held by the Frankish settlers from 1192. In 1283 Rushmiya was mentioned as part of the domain of the Crusaders, according to the hudna between the Crusaders in Acre and the Mamluk sultan Qalawun. Frankish rule ended soon after, in 1291.

Denys Pringle suggested that this was the Crusader place known as Francheville.

=== Late Ottoman period ===
In 1870, Victor Guérin noted it as a small, ruined village.

In 1881, the PEF's Survey of Western Palestine (SWP) described Rushmia: "The ruin of a rectangular building, with a tower in its north-east corner. The walls are standing some 15 feet high in places. The building measures 35 feet north and south, and 45 east and west outside. The tower is about 15 feet square, and intended to flank the northern entrance. The east wall has been destroyed. The walls are 7 feet thick, built of courses of ashlar, the stones averaging 2 feet 3 inches by 1 foot, 2 inches by 1 foot 2 inches. The material used is very soft, and the stones much worn; the mortar joints are very thick, and large pieces of pottery are used. No drafted stones were seen.

The tower is entered by a door 5 feet high, 2 feet broad, on the west. The roof is of rough stones, with a pointed arch. It is barrel-vaulted, and covered with hard cement. On the south is a loophole-window, and a side-door, the latter with a flat lintel. On the west wall is a window with retaining arch, and a small window above. All these arches are pointed. There is a large window in the south wall of the main building. It appears to have had a semicircular arch.

The site is a very commanding one. A path leads down to Haifa. There are ruins all round for a distance of some hundred yards. About 150 yards west are four vaults, apparently the basement of some building.

This is evidently the ruin of a fortress, on the hill-side, and the character of the masonry would lead to the supposition that it was one of those constructed by Dhaher el 'Amr."

=== Modern period ===
==== Second Intifada ====
On March 31, 2002, an 18-year-old Arab suicide bomber, Shadi Tobassi, from Jenin blew himself up at the Matza restaurant located on the highway east of Romema, killing 14 people. Hamas and Islamic Jihad took responsibility for the attack.

== Landmarks ==
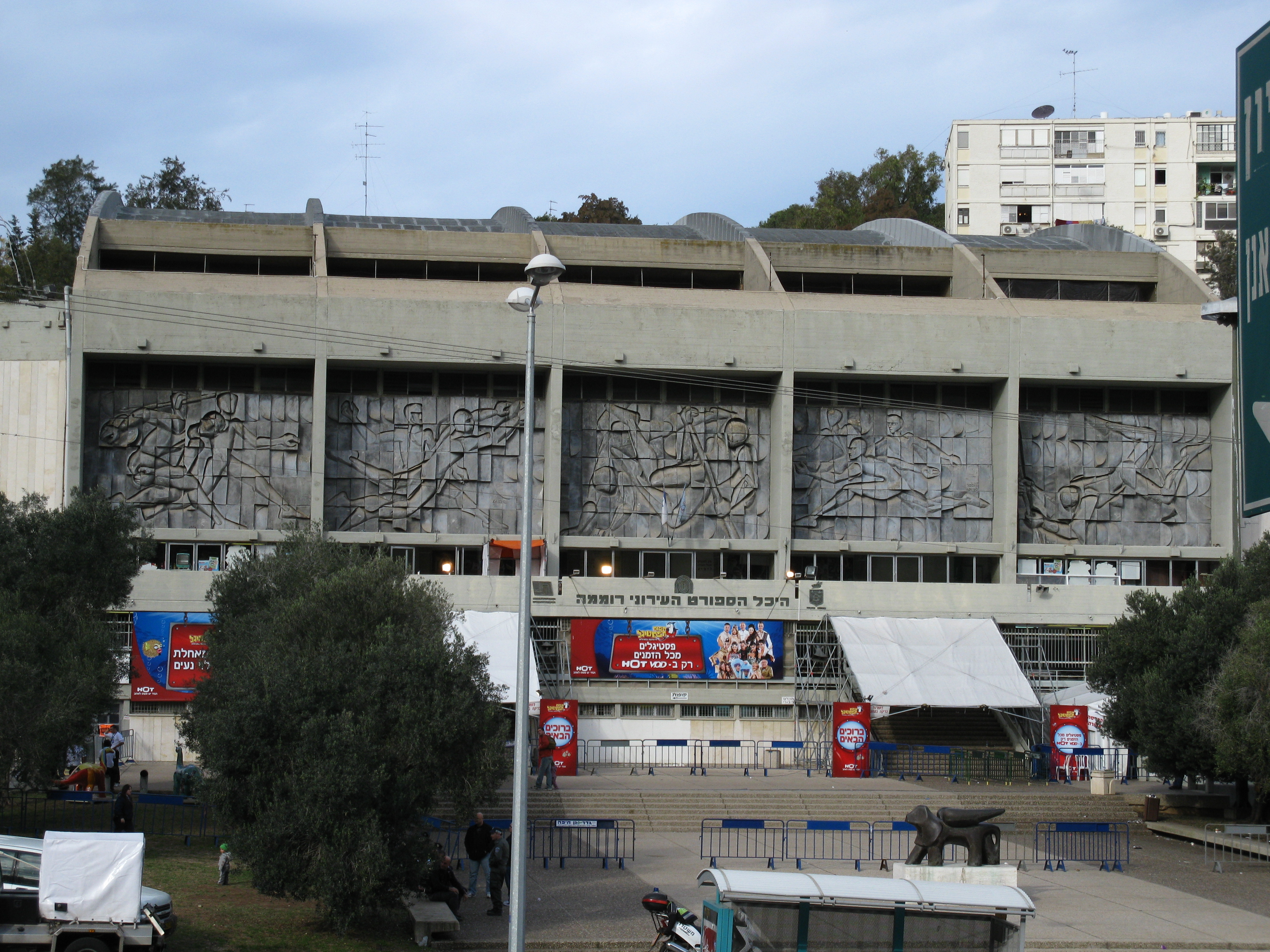
Heichal HaSport

Heichal HaSport, the Haifa Municipal Sports Complex, is located in Romema. The arena holds some 3,400 spectators and is among the largest in Israel.

== Bibliography ==
- Barag, Dan (1979). "A new source concerning the ultimate borders of the Latin Kingdom of Jerusalem". Israel Exploration Journal. 29: 197–217.
- Conder, C.R.; Kitchener, H.H. (1881). The Survey of Western Palestine: Memoirs of the Topography, Orography, Hydrography, and Archaeology. Vol. 1. London: Committee of the Palestine Exploration Fund.
- Dauphin, C. (1998). La Palestine byzantine, Peuplement et Populations. BAR International Series 726 (in French). Vol. III : Catalogue. Oxford: Archeopress. ISBN 0-860549-05-4.
- Guérin, V. (1875). Description Géographique Historique et Archéologique de la Palestine (in French). Vol. 2: Samarie, pt. 2. Paris: L'Imprimerie Nationale.
- Massarwa, Abdallah (2014-07-02). "Haifa, Romema Final Report" (126). Hadashot Arkheologiyot – Excavations and Surveys in Israel.
- Massarwa, Abdallah (2015-04-15). "Haifa, Romema Final Report" (127). Hadashot Arkheologiyot – Excavations and Surveys in Israel.
- Mülinen, Egbert Friedrich von (1908). "Beiträge zur Kenntnis des Karmels". Zeitschrift des Deutschen Palästina-Vereins. 31. Leipzig: 1–258. (pp. 32-35)
- Palmer, E.H. (1881). The Survey of Western Palestine: Arabic and English Name Lists Collected During the Survey by Lieutenants Conder and Kitchener, R. E. Transliterated and Explained by E.H. Palmer. Committee of the Palestine Exploration Fund.
- Pringle, D. (1997). Secular buildings in the Crusader Kingdom of Jerusalem: an archaeological Gazetter. Cambridge University Press. ISBN 0521-46010-7.
- Pringle, D. (1998). The Churches of the Crusader Kingdom of Jerusalem: L-Z (excluding Tyre). Vol. II. Cambridge University Press. ISBN 0-521-39037-0.
- Shatzman, I. (1991). The Armies of the Hasmonaeans and Herod: From Hellenistic to Roman Frameworks. Tübingen: Mohr Siebeck. ISBN 9783161456176.
- Torgë, Hagit (2014-09-28). "Haifa, Romema Final Report" (126). Hadashot Arkheologiyot – Excavations and Surveys in Israel.
- Wilson, C.W., ed. (c. 1881). Picturesque Palestine, Sinai and Egypt. Vol. 3. New York: D. Appleton. (pp. 102-3)
