= French Carmel =

Coordinates: 32°49′8.08″N 34°58′24.89″E

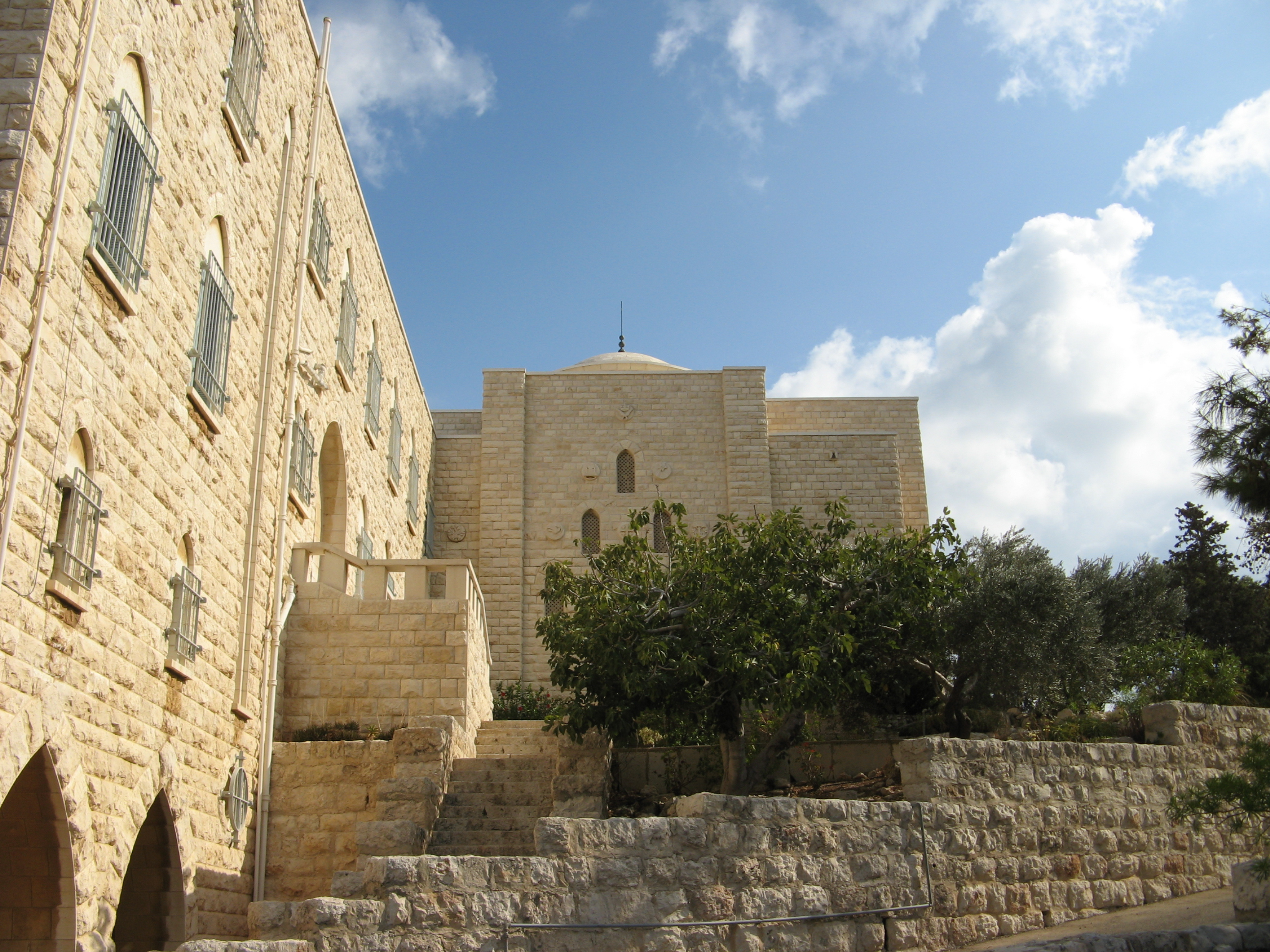
Our Lady of Mount Carmel Monastery

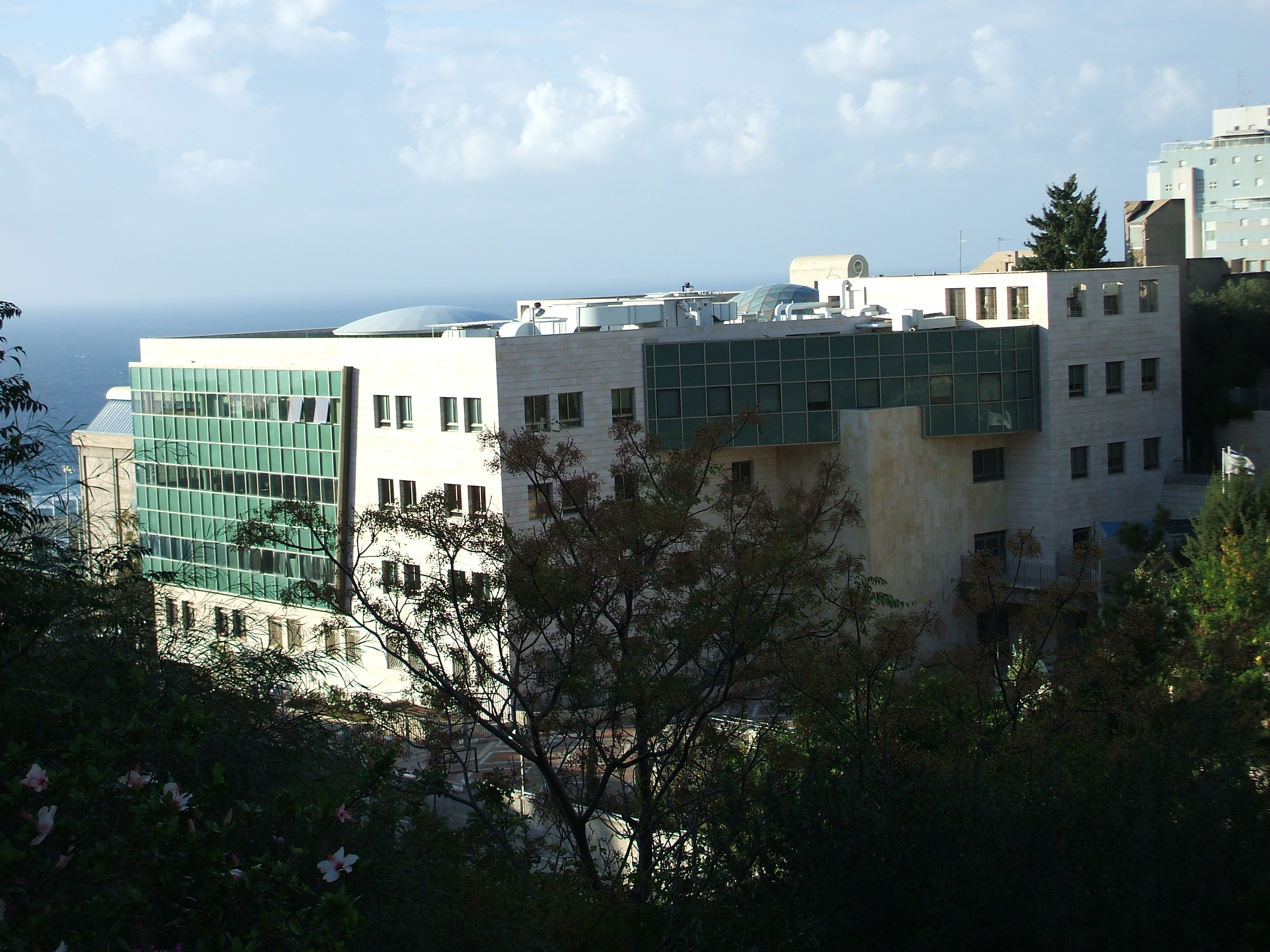
Leo Baeck school

French Carmel (Hebrew: כרמל צרפתי) is a neighbourhood of Haifa in Israel, located on the western slopes of Mount Carmel. The population is predominantly Jewish.

== History ==
The name "French Carmel" was given to the area due to the fact that the Discalced Carmelites were only able to acquire an Ottoman building permit for the monastery they erected here in 1867-74 thanks to the intervention of the French consul, and after its destruction they rebuilt the Stella Maris Monastery in the current shape between 1827 and 1836 with constant support from the kings of France.

The French Carmel is the home of the Stella Maris Monastery, the Leo Baeck High School, the Gordon College of Education, and Our Lady of Mount Carmel Monastery.
