= Frederick Palmer (engineer) =

British civil engineer (1862–1934)

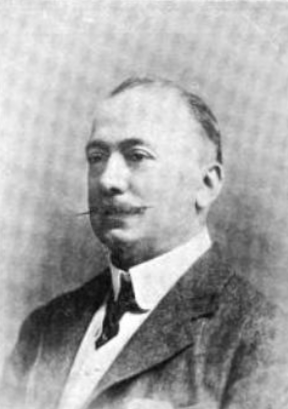
- Born: 31 January 1862; Carmarthenshire, Wales
- Died: 7 April 1934 (aged 72); Lingfield, England
- Occupation: Engineer

Sir Frederick Palmer KCMG CIE (31 January 1862 – 7 April 1934) was a British civil engineer.

== Biography ==
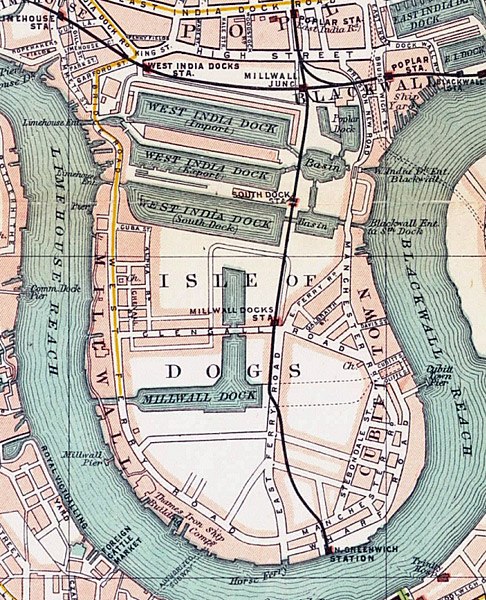
map showing the layout of the individual docks at West India Docks

Palmer was born in Carmarthenshire, Wales in 1862. He was educated in Neath, and worked as an assistant engineer on the Great Western Railway. He then joined the East Indian Railway Company as an engineer, where he remained for almost eighteen years. He was appointed engineer to the Calcutta Port Commissioners in 1901.

Palmer returned to England in 1909, as chief engineer of the Port of London Authority. He undertook several projects at the West India Docks. The first was the construction of several sheds at the Import Dock between 1912 and 1917. Between 1926 and 1930 he built five more sheds at the South Dock and between 1929 and 1930 he constructed four more at the Export Dock.

Palmer was a founding partner of the firm Rendel, Palmer and Tritton. He served as president of the Institution of Civil Engineers (ICE) between November 1926 and November 1927. Palmer was appointed a Companion of the Order of the Indian Empire in 1907, and a Knight Commander of the Order of St Michael and St George in 1930. His son, John Palmer, made a bequest of an endowment fund to the ICE in 1960 to mark the centenary of his father's birth. The fund provides for a monetary prize and certificate for a paper submitted to the ICE on the subject of the economic and financial aspects of civil engineering.

He died at his home in Lingfield, Surrey on 7 April 1934.
