= Pevsner =

Pevsner or Pevzner is a Jewish surname. Notable people with the surname include:

- Aihud Pevsner (1925–2018), American physicist
- Antoine Pevsner (1886–1962), Russian sculptor, brother of Naum Gabo
- David Pevsner, American actor, singer, dancer and writer
- Keren Pevzner (born 1961), Israeli writer
- Nikolaus Pevsner (1902–1983), German-born British historian and critic of art and architecture
- Pavel A. Pevzner, computer scientist
- Shmuel Pevzner (1878–1930), Russian-born Jewish writer and industrialist
- Stella Pevsner, author of children's books
- Tom Pevsner (1926–2014), German-born British film producer, son of Nikolaus

== Fictional people ==
- "Baldy" Pevsner, legendary player for Neasden FC, in the North Circular Relegation League, as depicted in Private Eye
- Jacob Pevsner, a character in Ninjago
