= Great Synagogue (Tel Aviv) =

Orthodox synagogue in Tel Aviv, Israel

Great Synagogue of Tel Aviv
- Hebrew: בית כנסת הגדול (תל אביב)
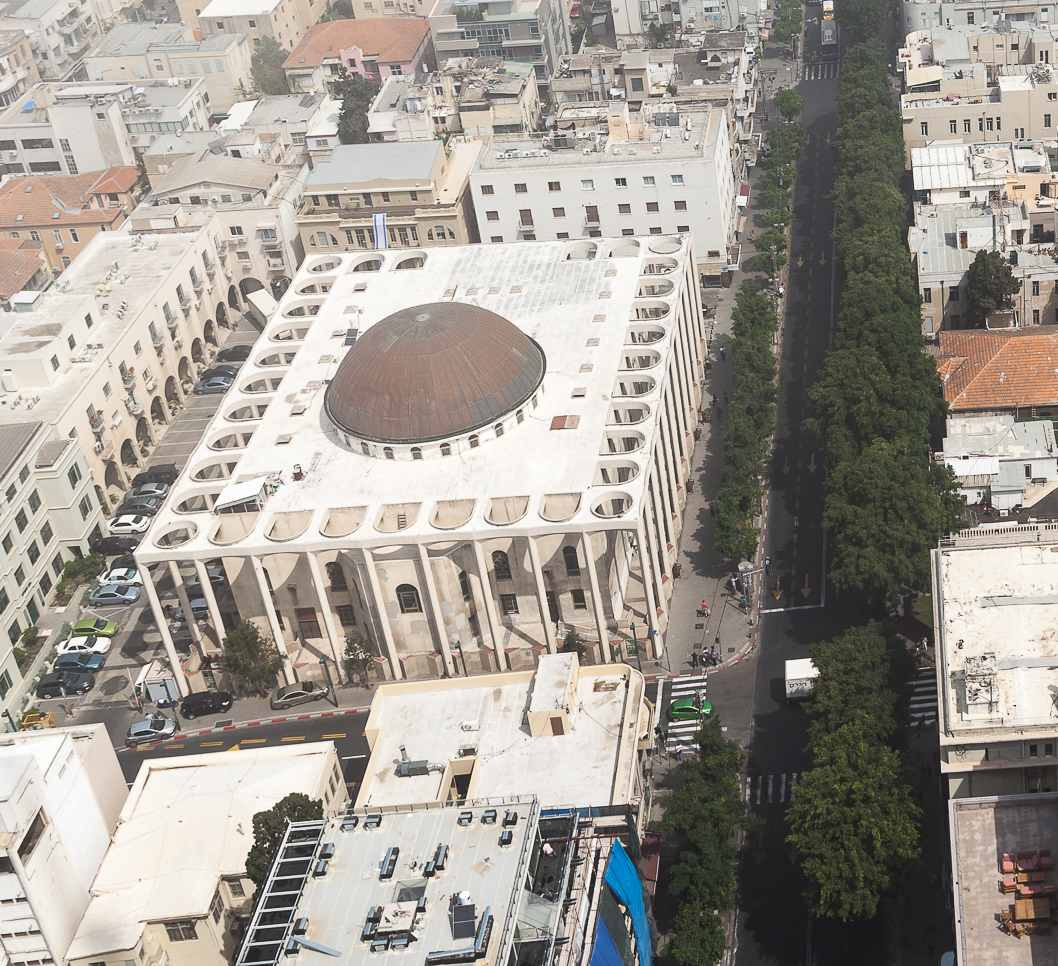
- Aerial view of the synagogue

- Location of the synagogue in Tel Aviv

Religion
- Affiliation: Orthodox Judaism
- Ecclesiastical or organizational status: Synagogue
- Status: Active

Location
- Location: 110 Allenby Street, Tel Aviv
- Country: Israel
- Interactive map of Great Synagogue of Tel Aviv
- Coordinates: 32°03′52″N 34°46′20″E

Architecture
- Architects: Alexander Baerwald (drawings); Yehuda Magidovitch (plans); Arieh El-Hanani (1969 renovation)
- Type: Synagogue architecture
- Style: Art Deco; Modernist
- Funded by: Baron Edmond James de Rothschild
- Established: 1913 (as a congregation)
- Groundbreaking: 1924
- Completed: 1926; 1969 (renovations)

Specifications
- Dome: One
- Materials: Concrete, glass, and steel

Website
- tlvgreatsynagogue.org/English

The Great Synagogue of Tel Aviv (Hebrew: בית כנסת הגדול) is an Orthodox Jewish congregation and synagogue, located at 110 Allenby Street, Tel Aviv, Israel. The synagogue is sited just east of the Shalom Meir Tower. It was designed by Yehuda Magidovitch and completed in 1926 in the Art Deco style. The synagogue underwent significant renovations in 1969, including the addition of Modernist façade with arches.

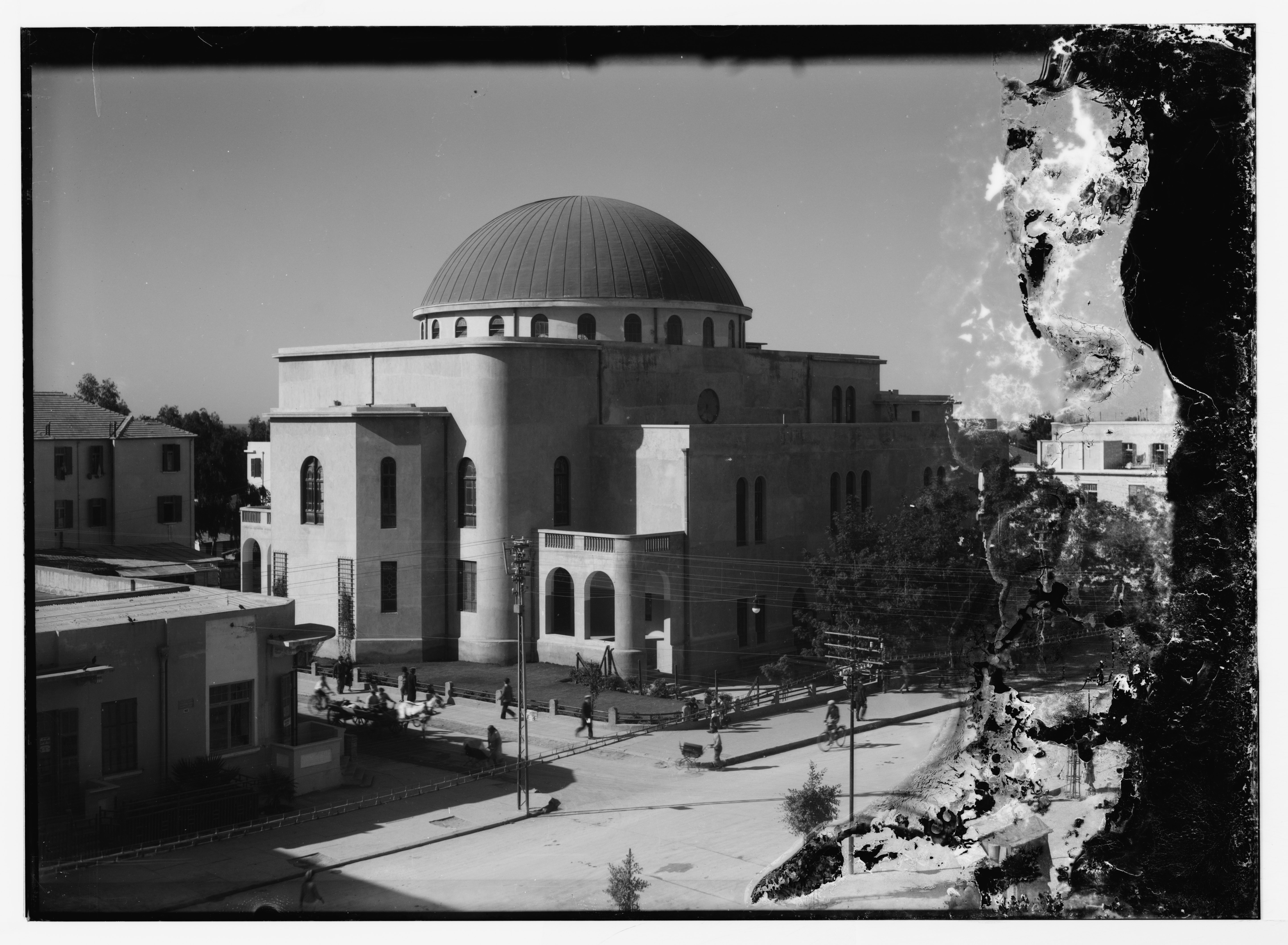
The old photo of Great Synagogue

The synagogue was situated in the heart of Little Tel Aviv, but today it stands in the city's bustling business and financial district. Due to demographic changes in the 1960s, its congregation has dwindled, with the main sanctuary is primarily used for Jewish weddings and special occasions. Daily services are held in a small synagogue on the lower level.

== History ==
A cornerstone for a Great Synagogue was laid in 1913 on Yehuda Halevi Street. However, construction was postponed due to various reasons. In 1914, an architectural competition was held for the new site on Allenby Street, which was won by Richard Michael. With the outbreak of World War I, Michael was unable to complete the project and was replaced by Alexander Baerwald, a Jewish German architect.

In a festive ceremony in November 1921, the cornerstone was laid for the building on Allenby Street. To emphasize Jewish unity, 12 foundation stones representing the 12 tribes were sold to finance the construction. The project was finally completed in 1925 with the financial assistance of Baron Edmond James de Rothschild.

In 1969, architect Aryeh Elhanani led a renovation that modernized the synagogue, adding arches and updating the interior to reflect contemporary tastes in architecture and design.

The synagogue features a large dome, intricate lighting, and stained glass windows that replicate those lost in European synagogues during the Holocaust.

Architect Ze'ev Rechter planned an Italian-style plaza around the synagogue in the late 1930s, although only part of the plan was executed.

Following the King David Hotel bombing in 1946, weapons were discovered in the synagogue's basement. The caretaker, Eliezer Neuman, was subsequently detained by British military authorities and sentenced to a one-year term.

The Great Synagogue hosted the magazine Synagogue from 1946 to 1948. In 1985, scenes from the film Alex Is Lovesick were shot here.

In 2016, restoration efforts began to restore the synagogue's original 1920s appearance, funded by the municipality and a ₪20 million donation from Patrick Drahi. The restoration is expected to be completed in 2027 and it will allow for improved use as a municipal center for religious services, as well as community activity and tourism.

== Gallery ==
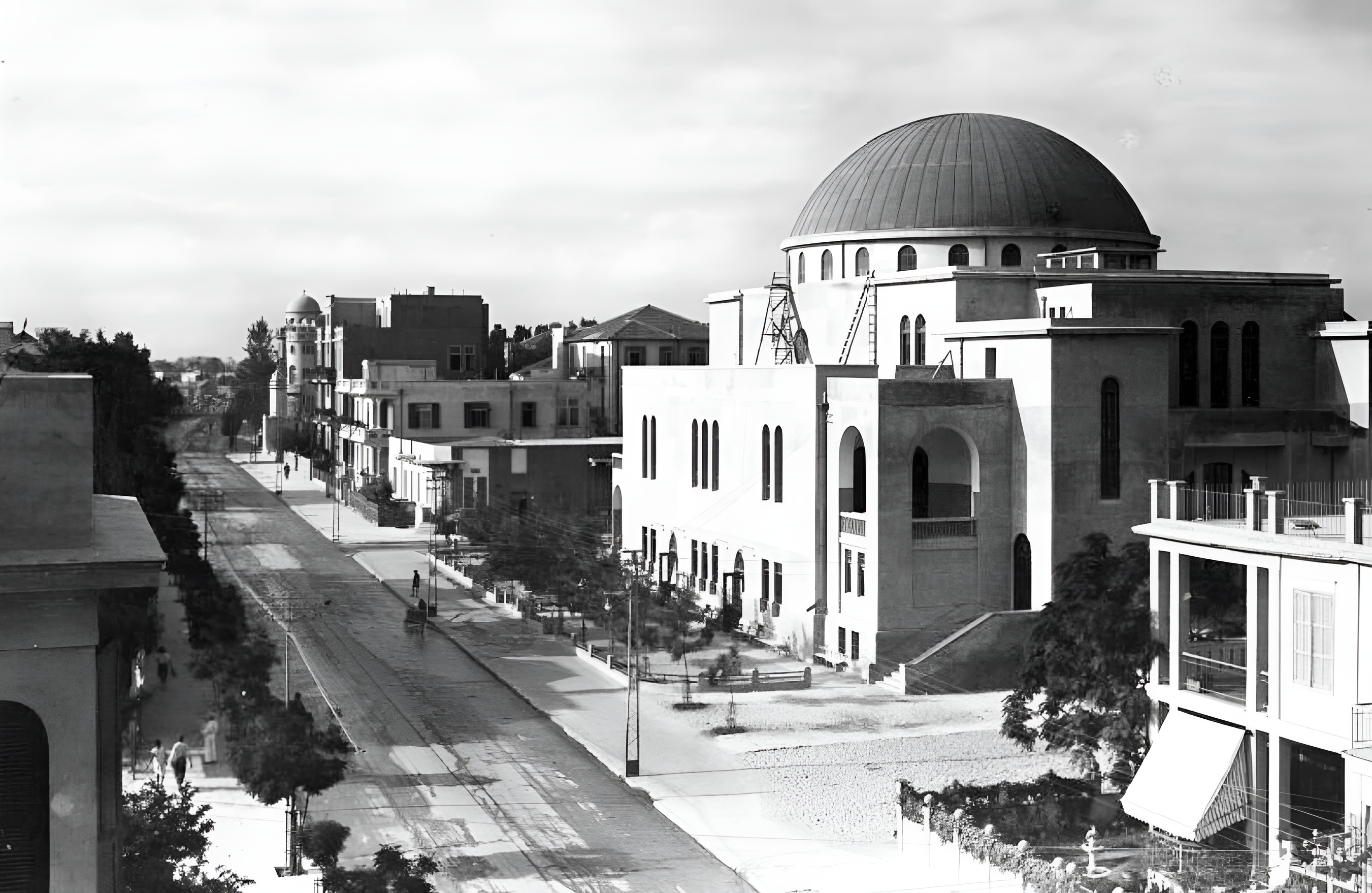
The synagogue, in c. 1940s

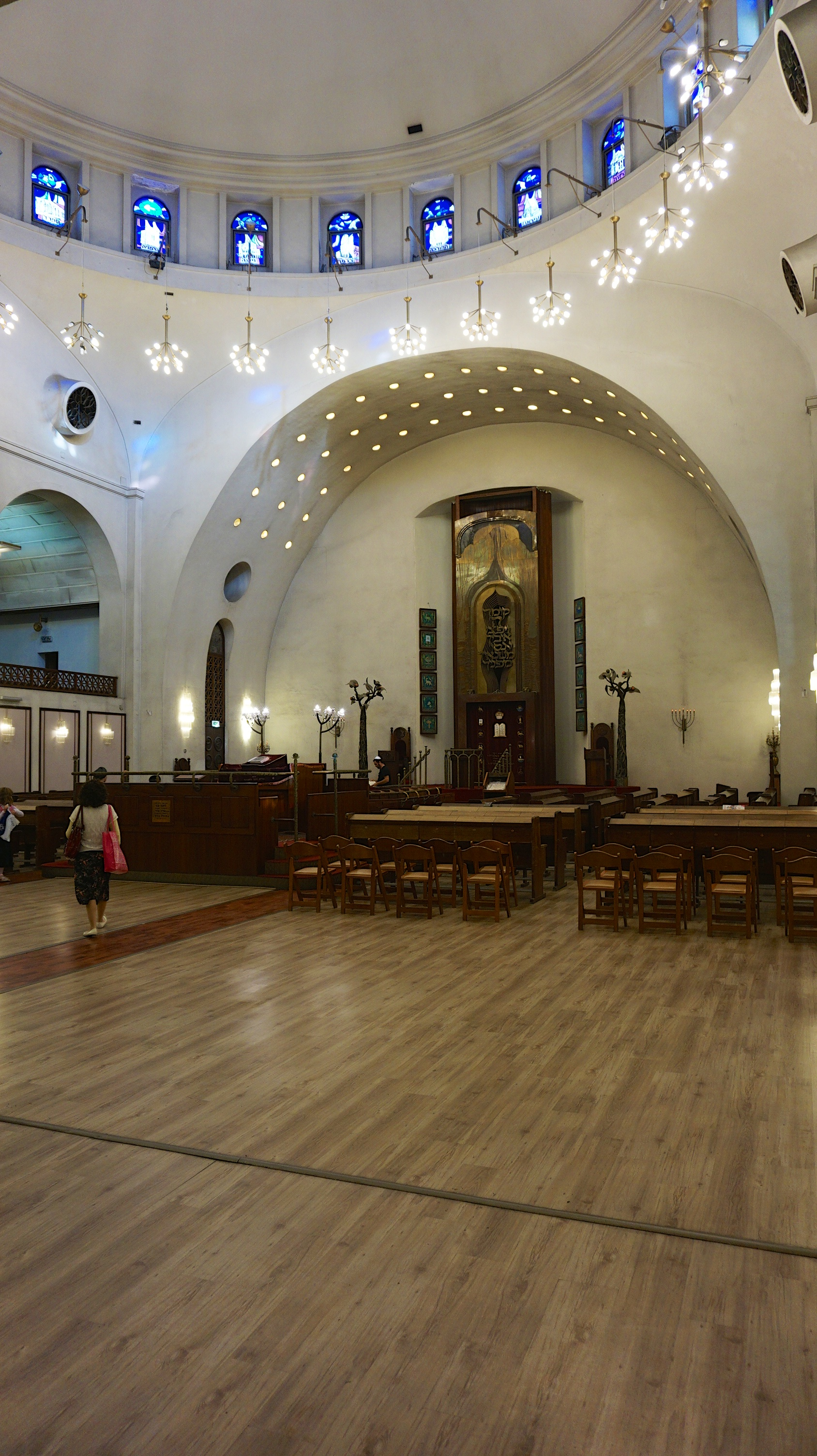
The synagogue interior

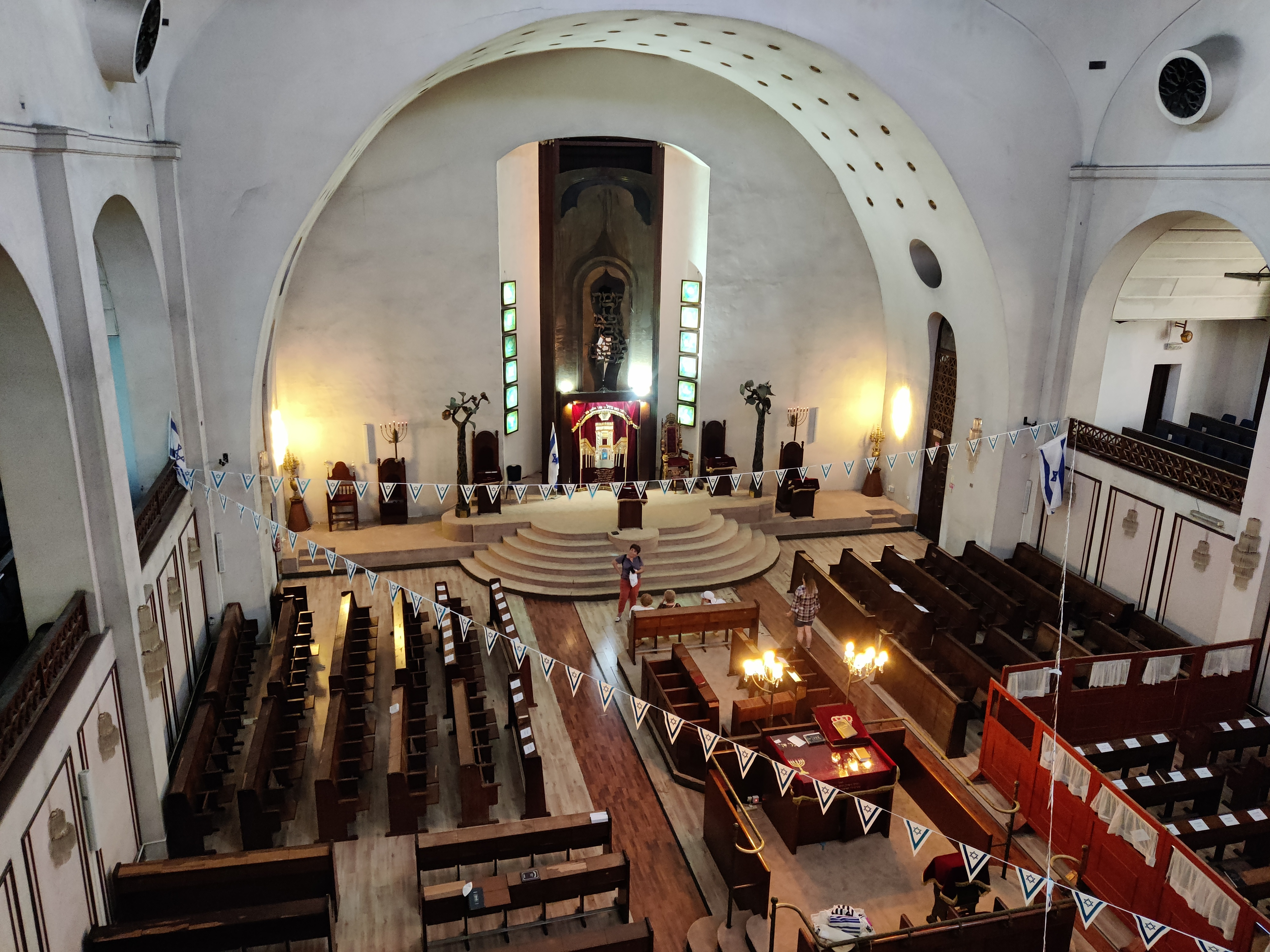
The synagogue interior

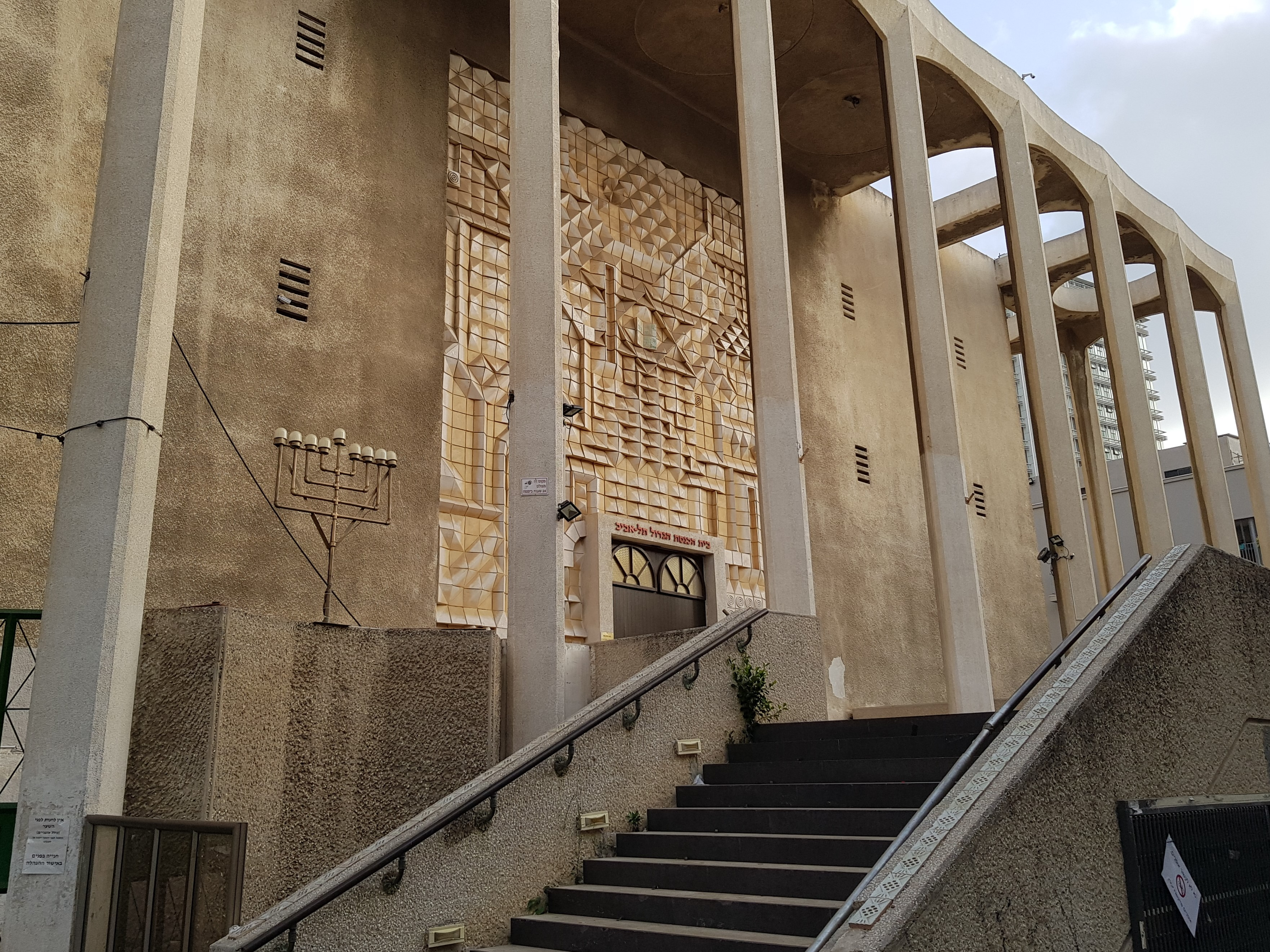
Exterior view

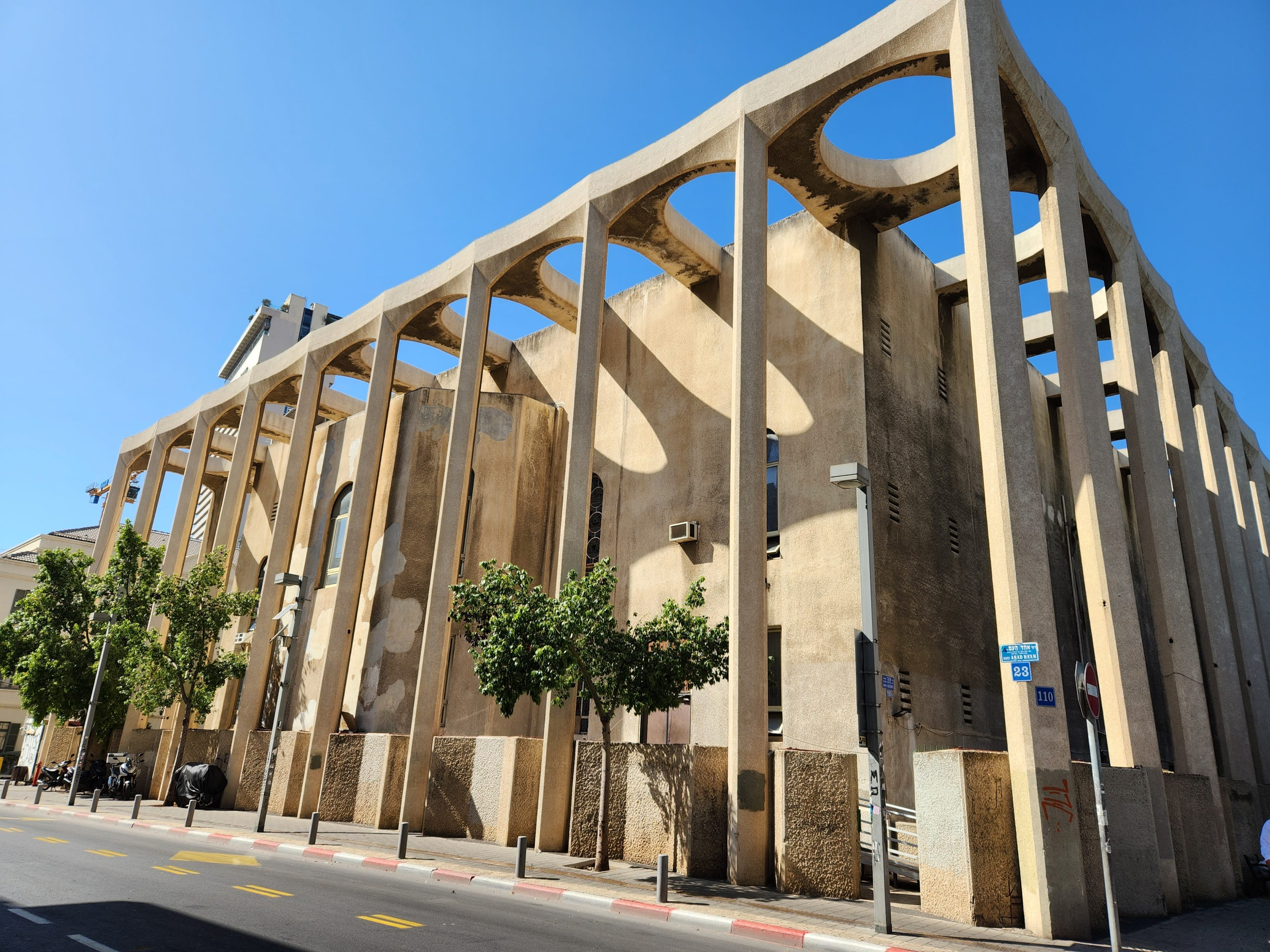
The arcade of the great synagogue

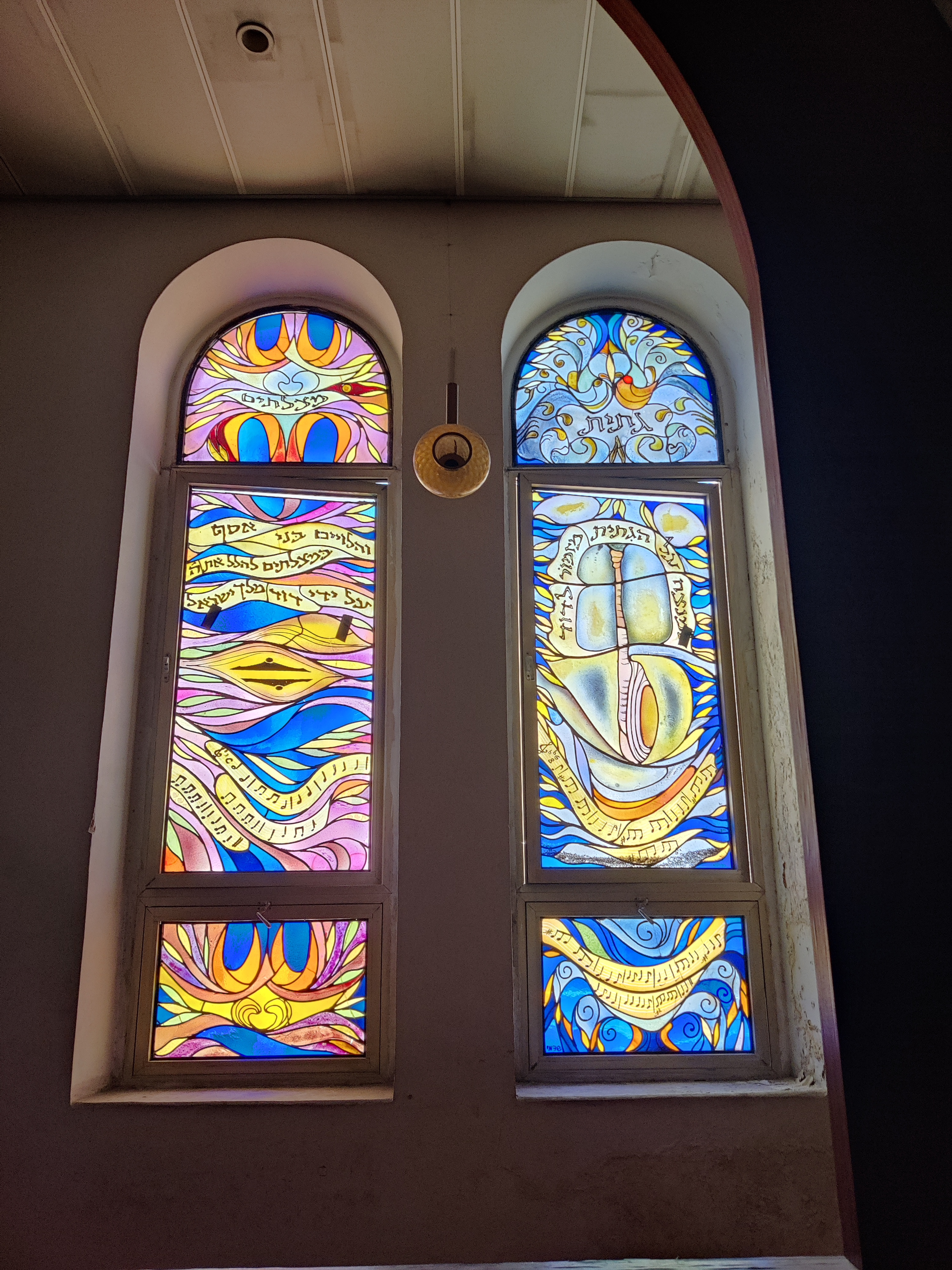
Windows of the synagogue

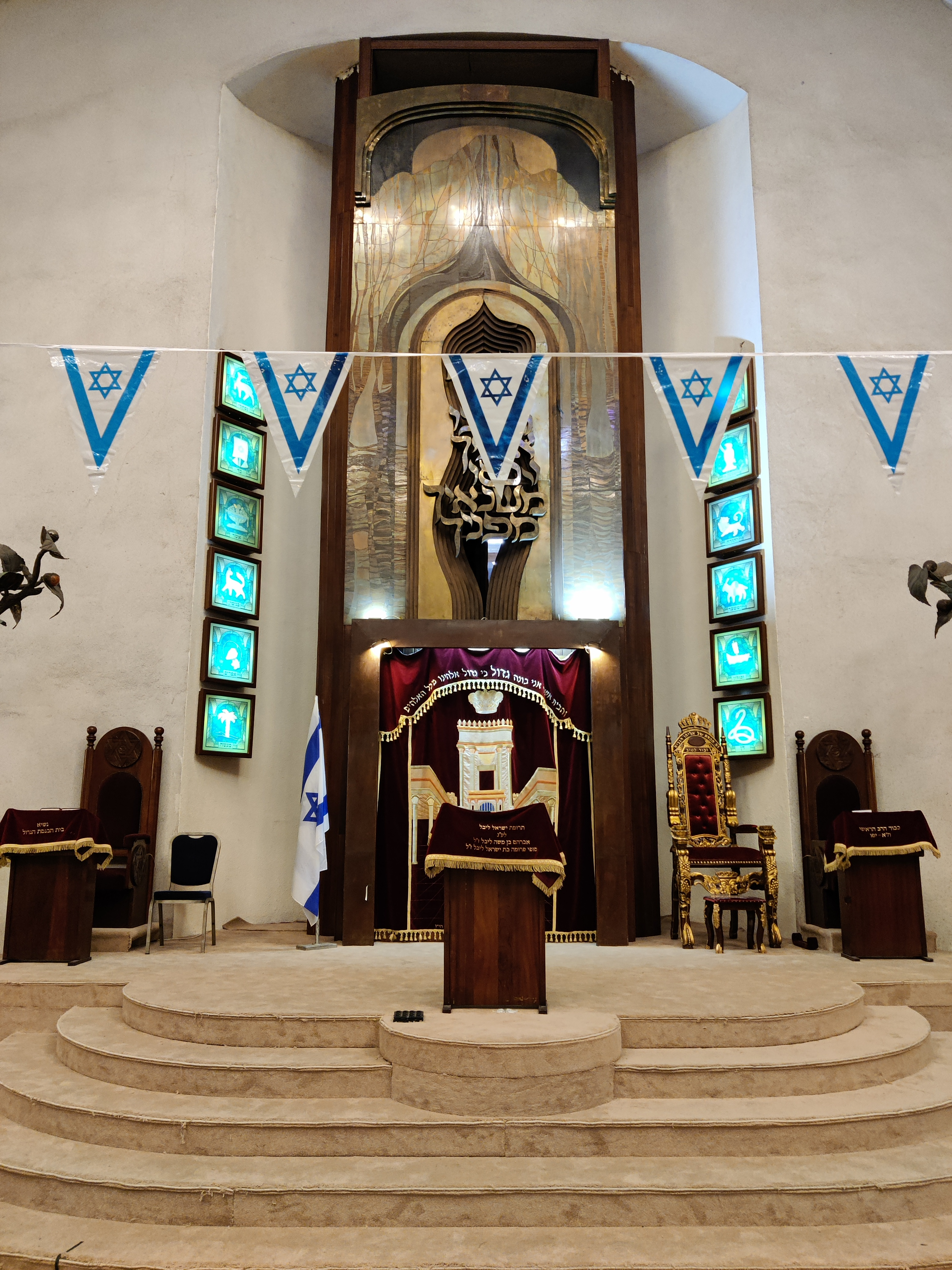
Aron Kodesh

== See also ==
- History of the Jews in Israel
- List of synagogues in Israel
