= Yehuda Magidovitch =

Israeli architect (1886–1961)

- יהודה מגידוביץ
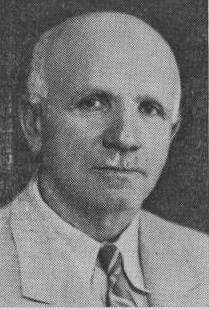
- Born: 1886; Uman, Ukraine
- Died: 1961 (aged 74–75); Tel Aviv, Israel
- Occupation: Architect

Yehuda Magidovitch (Hebrew: יהודה מגידוביץ; 1886–1961) was one of the most prolific Israeli architects. Among his prominent works are the Galei Aviv Casino, a café-restaurant (demolished in 1939), the great synagogue of Tel Aviv, the former Soviet Embassy in Tel Aviv and the Cinema Esther (now Cinema Hotel), both in Tel Aviv.

== Biography ==
=== Early life ===
Yehuda Magidovitch was born in 1886 in Uman in Ukraine, back then part of the Russian Empire. He studied in Odessa. In 1919, he emigrated to Mandatory Palestine on board the Ruslan with fellow architect Ze'ev Rechter, artist Yitzhak Frenkel and historian Joseph Klausner.

=== Career ===
Magidovitch became the first chief engineer of Tel Aviv in 1920. In 1923 he established his own design and construction company. In 1934 his son Raphael also joined the office.

Magidovitch first built in the 1920s in the eclectic style, but beginning in the early 1930s he started moving towards Art Deco. His first International style designs from 1934 retained a personal artistic expression.

=== Death ===
Magidovitch suffered a brain hemorrhage in 1954, which brought his professional activity to an end. He died in 1961 in Tel Aviv, Israel.

== Gallery ==
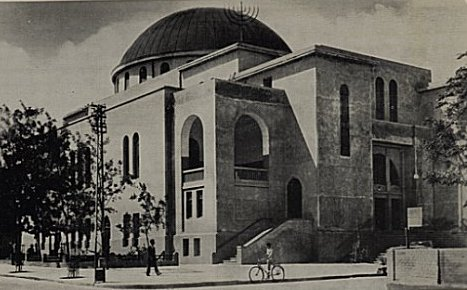
Great Synagogue of Tel Aviv in the 1930s (built 1924-25)

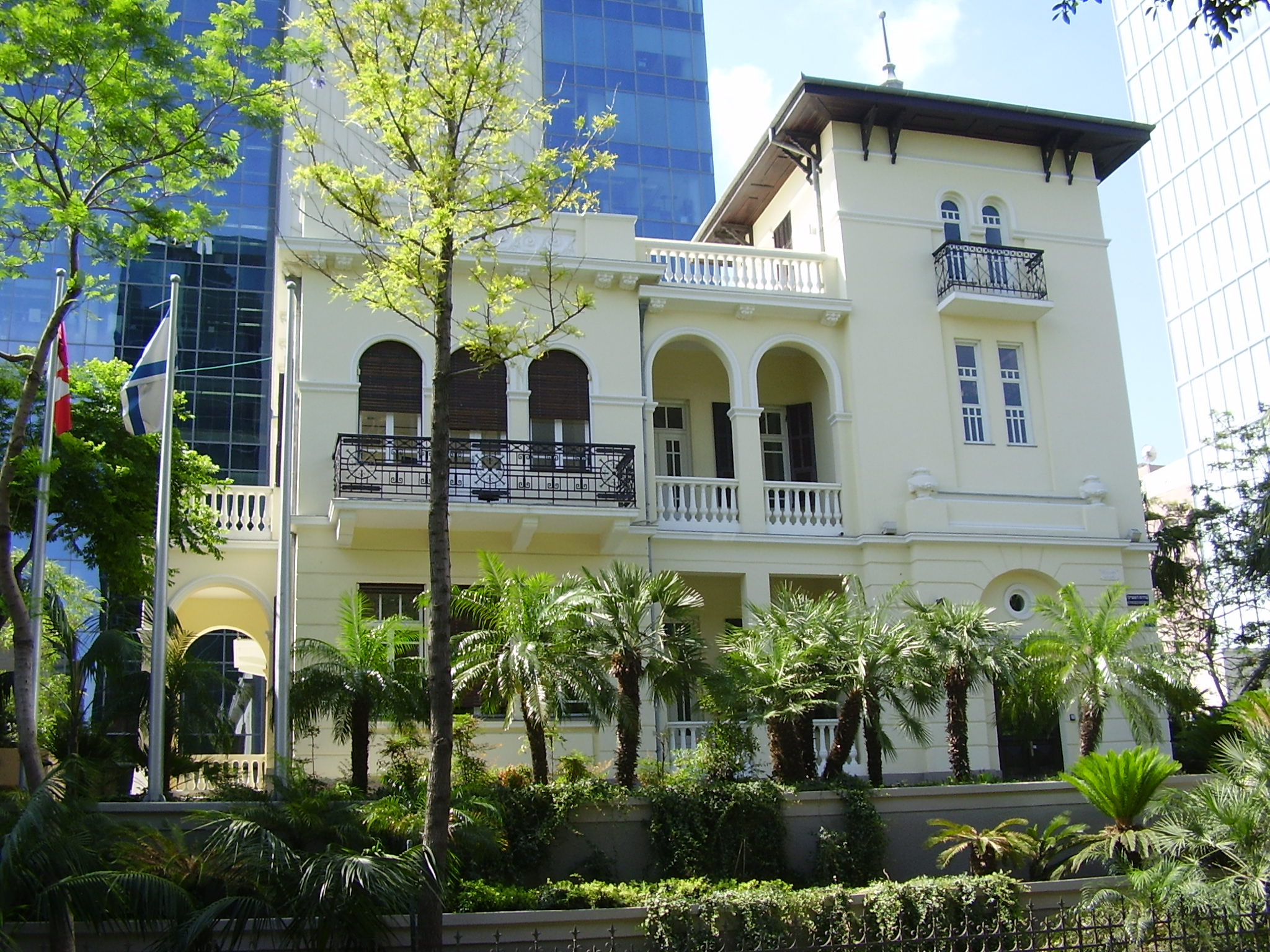
The Levin House, used for many years by the former Soviet embassy, Rothschild Boulevard, Tel Aviv (1924)

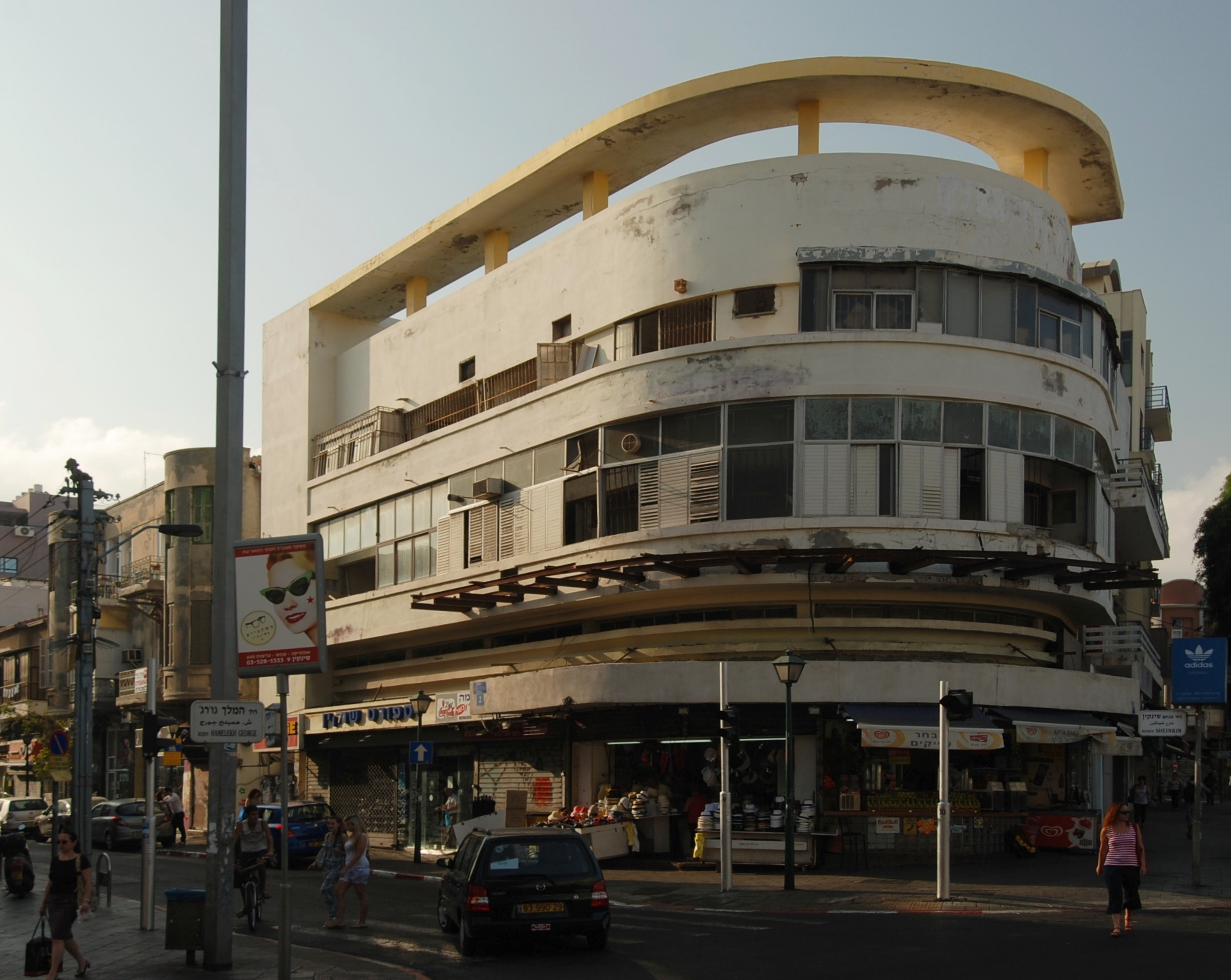
Gottgold House, Tel Aviv (1935–36); with Raphael Magidovitch. Built in a dialogue of forms with the Polishuk House (1934) across the street.

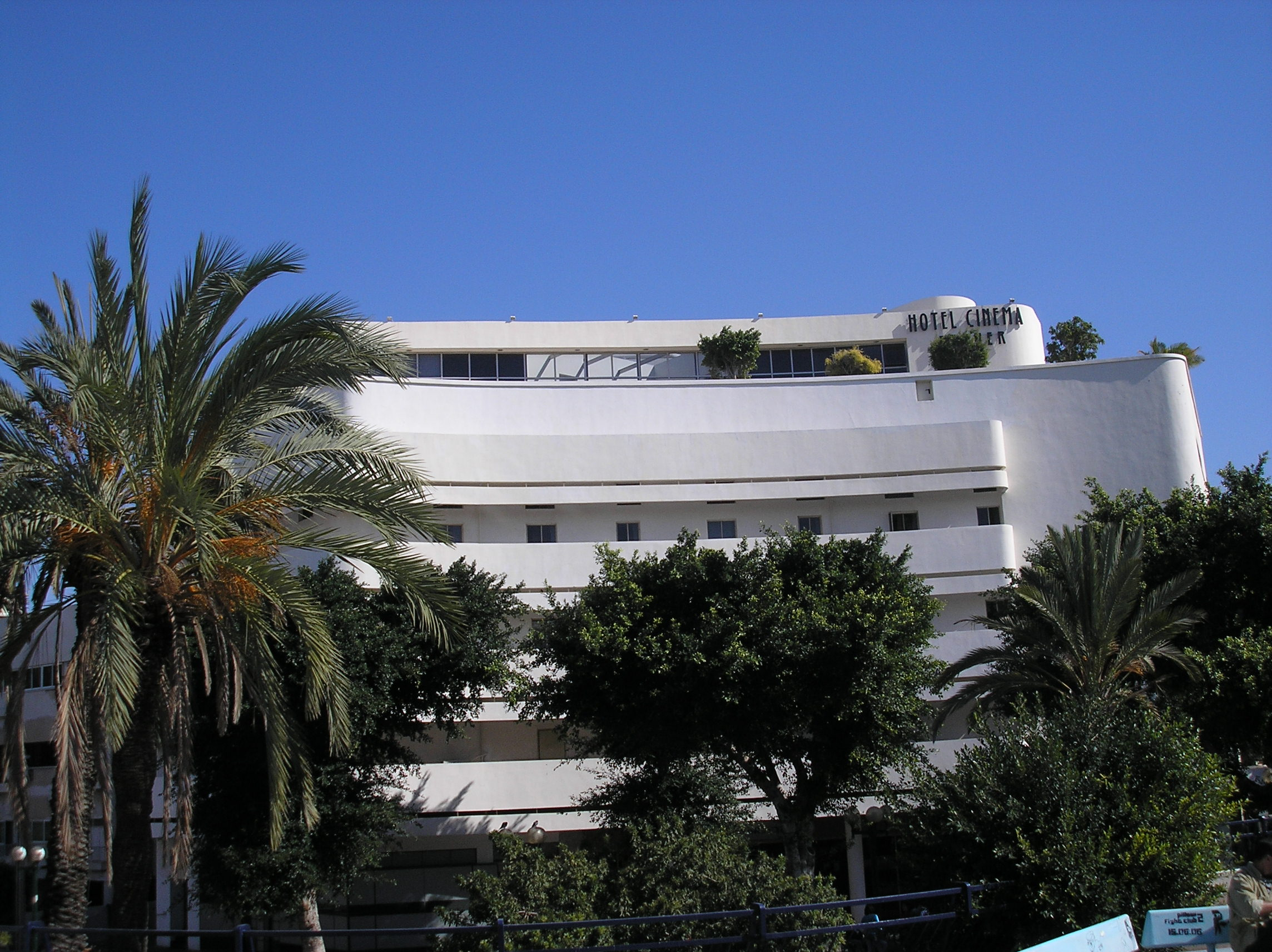
Cinema Esther, now Cinema Hotel, Tel Aviv (1938)

== See also ==
- White City (Tel Aviv)
