= Israel National Museum of Science, Technology, and Space =

Museum in Haifa, Israel

- מדעטק – המוזיאון הלאומי למדע, טכנולוגיה וחלל
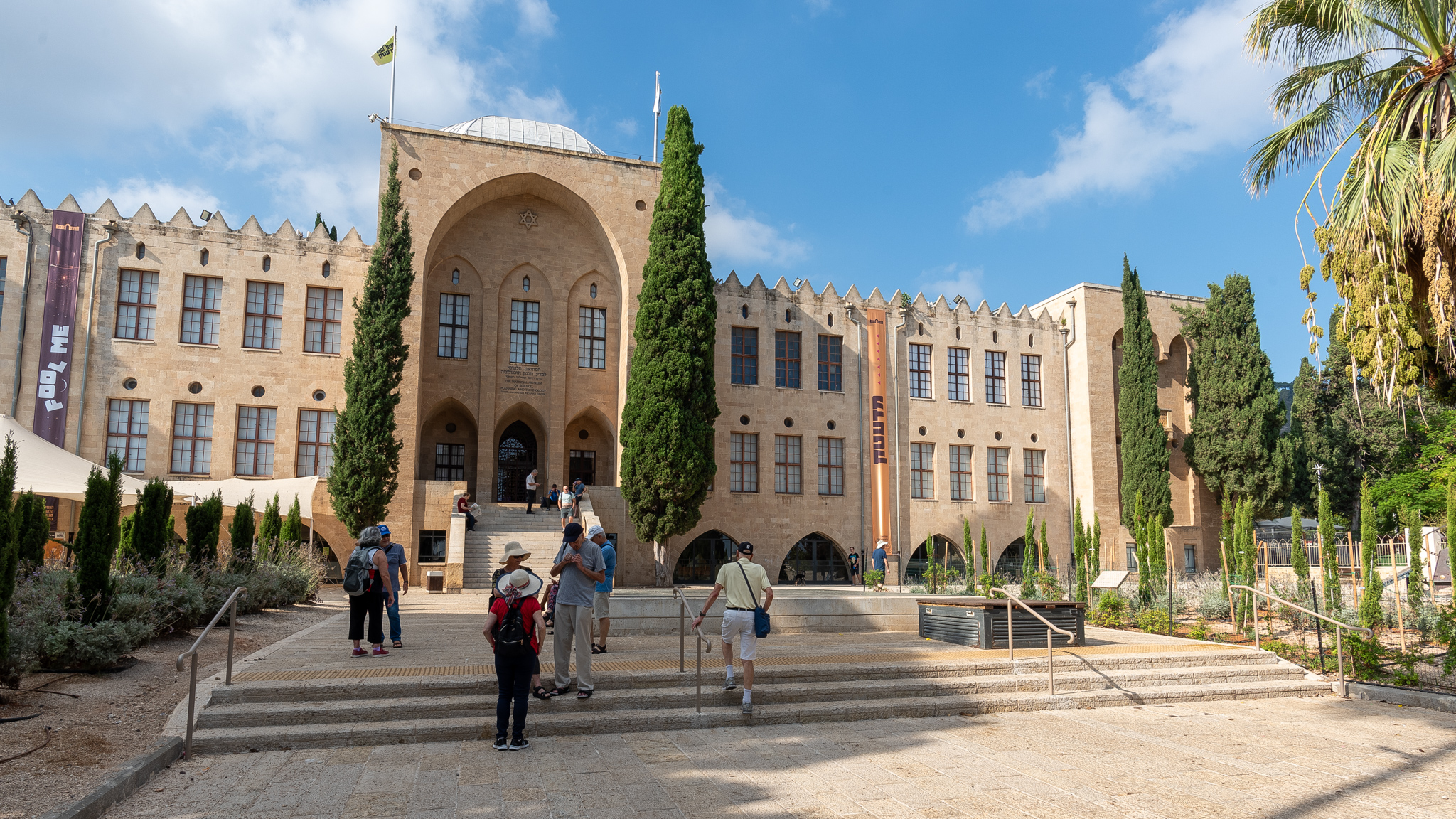
- The museum facade
- Established: 1983
- Location: 25 Shmaryahu Levin St., Hadar HaCarmel, Haifa 31448, Israel
- Coordinates: 32.810144°N 34.996272°E
- Type: National Museum of Science, Technology and Space
- Visitors: 300,000 per year
- Director: Yossi Ani
- Curator: Amir Schorr
- Owner: Israel
- Website: www.madatech.org.il

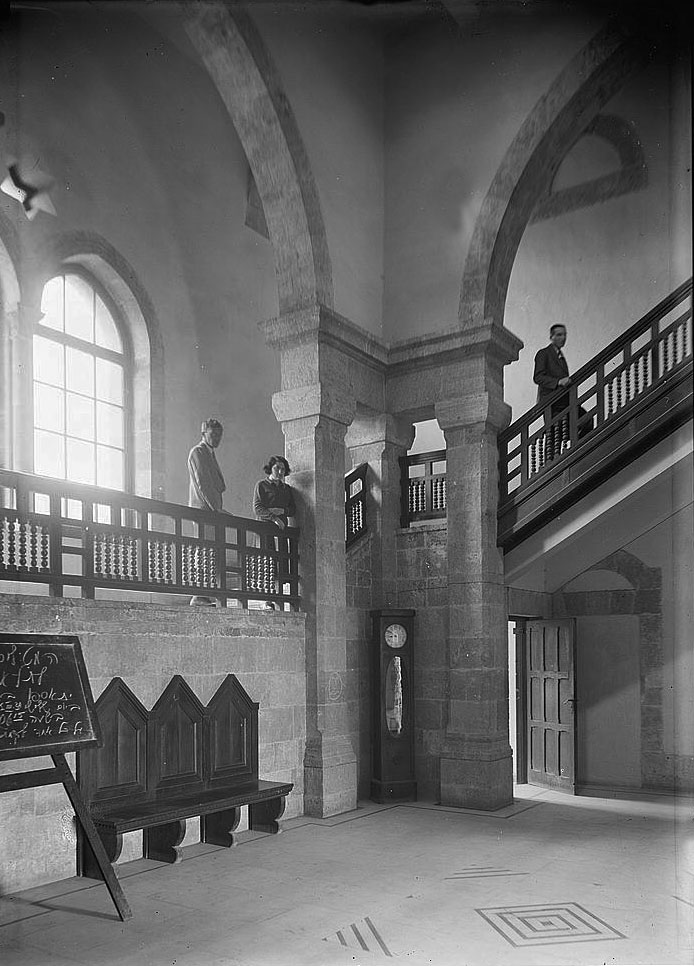
Entrance hall

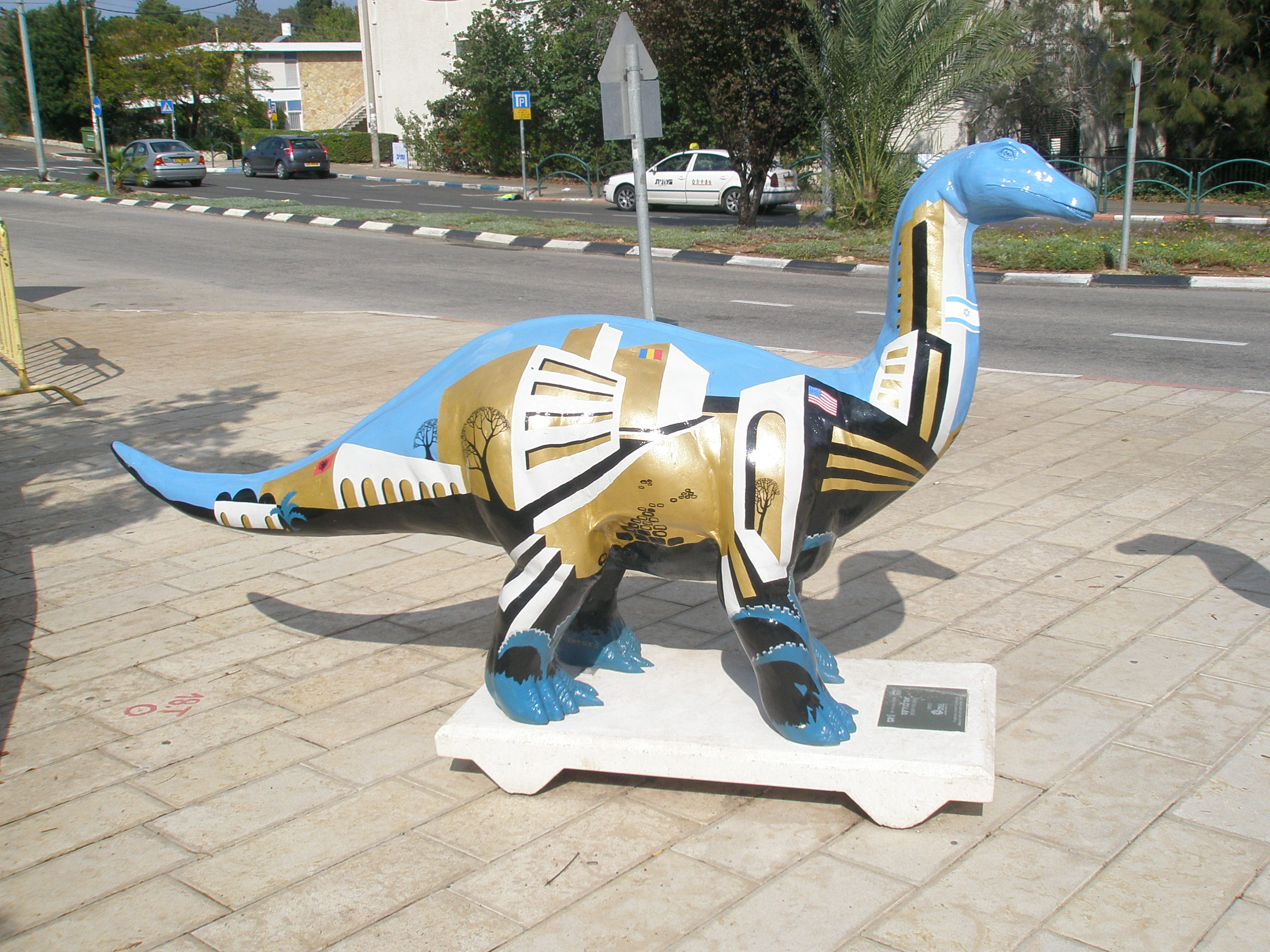
Dinosaur statue display, Haifa

The Israel National Museum of Science, Technology, and Space (also known as Madatech) (Hebrew: מדעטק – המוזיאון הלאומי למדע, טכנולוגיה וחלל MadaTek – HaMuze'on HaLe'umi LeMada, Tekhnologya VeHalal, Arabic: متحف إسرائيل الوطني للعلوم والتكنولوجيا والفضاء) is a science and technology museum in the city of Haifa, Israel. The museum has approximately 400,000 visitors annually.

== History ==
The museum, established in 1983, is housed in a historic building that was designed as the first home of the Technion – Israel Institute of Technology, until it relocated to its current campus. The architect was Alexander Baerwald, a German Jewish immigrant, who began working on the building in 1912. On a visit to the Technion in 1923, Albert Einstein planted one of the palm trees in the courtyard, which can still be seen today.

== Permanent exhibitions ==
- Green Energy – since 2007
- My Green Home (the "Green Energy" gallery floor)
- Acoustics Hall
- Puzzle Games
- Between Mount Carmel and the Sea – Taxidermy exhibition borrowed from the Shimon Angerss Nature House
- A Matter of Chemistry
- Imagine (Ilan Ramon)
- The secrets of life – DNA – since 2005
- Smile! It's Science – (teeth exhibition) since 2009
- Fly High – Aviation Exhibition
- Leonardo da Vinci – Scientist & Engineer
- Magical Science – since 2007 and returned at 2009

== Past exhibitions ==
- Nobel Faces – between January and May 2008.
- Days of Radio
- The Blue Rainbow (under-water photo exhibition)
- Einstein – The Man of The Century
- Personal Communication (Orange traveling exhibition)
- Road Traffic Safety Exhibition
- The Printing Press Exhibition

=== Science Park ===
In 2011, during Hanukkah, the yard between the two main buildings was reopened after going through a renovation. The yard was turned into a science park, which presents the famous scientists and inventors in history, and their discoveries which are important and enriching milestones.

The park is divided into five different courtyards; each one dedicated these famous scientists: Archimedes, Daniel Bernoulli, Isaac Newton, Leonardo da Vinci and Pythagoras. Additionally, there are a number of environmental exhibits. The amphitheater can host up to 400 visitors. In the center of the amphitheater there is a fountain shaped like a wind rose and controlled by a computer, allowing water shows combined with colorful lighting.

The initiative of establishing a science park began at 2008 and went through many stages of planning and preparing before constructing began. MadaTech's crew planned the park together under the supervision of MadaTech's treasurer – Dr. Tal Berman, and MadaTech's exhibition designer – Dudu Dahan. Developing and producing the exhibits was carried out mainly by the museum's workshop crew. The architectural plan was made by architects Amos Wachman and Ehud Casif.

== Summer exhibitions ==
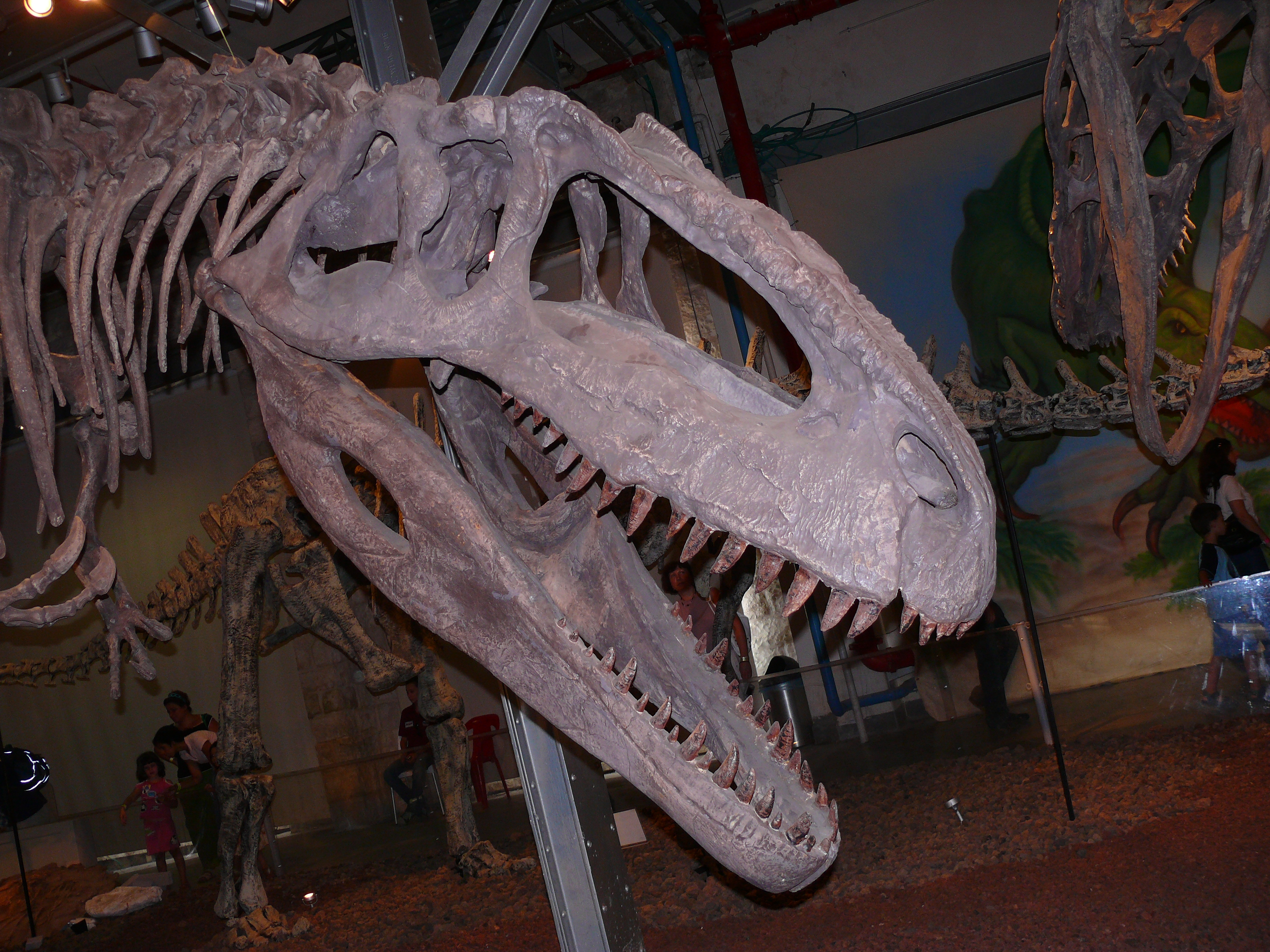
Dinosaurs: The Giants of Patagonia Exhibition

Since 2008, MadaTech launches a changing exhibition every summer, which remains open for about a year. As part of the process of improving the museum, a building which was used as the workshop was transformed. This building in which the changing exhibitions are presented is the education wing and apart from the exhibitions includes the movie theatre "CinematriX", school classrooms and laboratories and also serves as another entrance to the museum.

=== Dinosaurs: the Giants of Patagonia ===
On 11 July 2008, MadaTech launched the exhibition “Dinosaurs: The Giants of Patagonia”. The exhibition displayed replicas of giant dinosaur skeletons which were discovered in Patagonia, Argentina. The exhibition was the first of its kind in Israel. Among the fifteen skeletons which were presented, two of the dinosaurs were Giganotosaurus carolinii.

Simultaneously, an outdoor dinosaur statue display was launched throughout the city of Haifa. The dinosaur statues were identical in shape, but painted differently by different artists or other groups, such as school students or social activists. The dinosaurs received plenty of attention. The exhibition closed in March 2009, but some of the dinosaur statues are still spread around the city.

=== Body Worlds ===
In April 2009 the museum began to display the exhibition "Body Worlds", which uses human bodies which were donated for use in the exhibition. The opening of the exhibition was accompanied by a public protest, among others by Rabbi Yona Metzger, Chief Rabbi of Israel at the time, who claimed the exhibition was offending the deceased. The exhibition was displayed at MadaTech until 4 January 2010. During its display, more than 300,000 people visited "Body Worlds" exhibition.

=== Robotic World ===
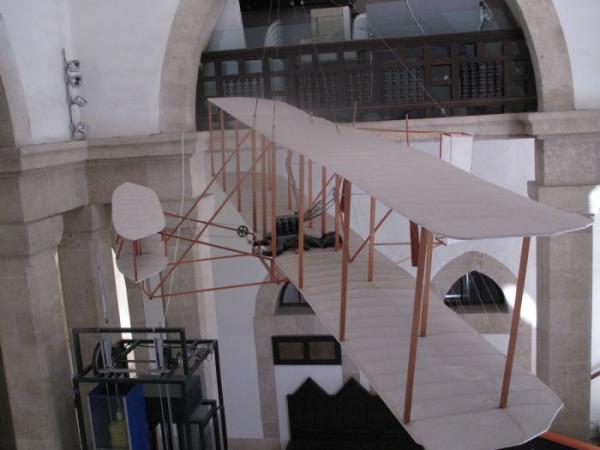
Wright Brothers' first motor plane replica, MadaTech

In summer 2010, the Robotics World exhibition was opened. The exhibition displayed animal designed robots such as a giraffe, a platypus, a cuttlefish, a bat, and a variety of exhibits from the animal world. The displays arrived to Israel from the international exhibition "Robot Zoo". In addition, the exhibition presented different robots and exhibits connected to the Israeli robot industry.

In the last part of the exhibition the "Robotic Show" was displayed every 30 minutes, and in it one of the museum instructors demonstrated the humanoid robot "Nao", and the robotic dog "AIBO", and explained how they perform the different actions.

=== Sport Science ===
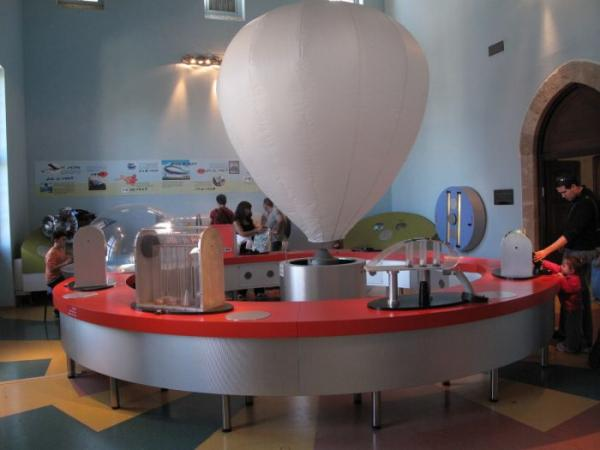
Fly High – Aviation Exhibition, MadaTech

The exhibition was inaugurated in June 2011 and most of its exhibits were from the original Canadian exhibition, alongside some new and exclusive exhibits. The main theme of the exhibition is sport and physical activity from a scientific point of view. The exhibition includes different displays which explain and demonstrate the different scientific principle. For example, beside the explanation about the human balance system and the inner ear fluid which allows it, there is a balance measurement device is positioned and also, a balance beam on which visitors try to walk using their balance.

=== 101 inventions that changed the world ===
This visual display was inaugurated in July 2012 and spread across the entire hall. The display includes a 32-minute film, which is screened on 22 huge screens and presents 101 inventions in eight periods of time, 32 of them in detail on the main screen. Additionally, in the exhibition building another room continued the display and included about 50 inventions accompanied with explanations on interactive touch screens.

=== Beyond planet earth ===
The exhibition was opened in March 2013 and presented the vision of the future human journey in the Solar System and beyond it. The first part displays the first 50 years in space – the Russian Sputnik and Vostok and on the opposing side, the American Apollo and Opportunity (rover).

=== Ships and the Sea ===
The exhibition which was brought from the science museum "eureka" in Helsinki, Finland, was inaugurated in April 2014. The exhibition displays the world of ships, sea and seamanship. The main theme is the transition from the open sea to the shore, when visitors pass through areas dedicated to different subjects. Among them, surviving in the middle of the ocean, sailing principles, sea research, the ship's bridge, activity and work in the modern port and Invasive species in the Mediterranean Sea.

== Education Wing ==
The Education wing is a center supporting science, technology and space studies for school students and other audiences. The education wing includes classrooms and laboratories and runs a wide variety of educational programs in different subjects such as: physics and astronomy, chemistry, quality of the environment, mathematics, robotics, genetics, electricity, and information security technologies.

== Wanger Family Fab-Lab ==
Fab lab is a center for planning, designing and producing with digital means. It includes computerized planning stations, 3D printers, a laser cutting system and an assembling station.

== CinematriX ==
In 2004, a new movie theater was opened in MadaTech: “CinematriX” – a theater that combined all the senses. The movies were screened in Stereoscopic 3D, and the viewers were asked to put on special glasses. The theater was equipped with chairs which included two speakers for stereoscopic sound for every viewer (the sound mix was quadraphonic, thanks to the two speakers at the front of the theatre which played the majority of the sound in the movies). During the screening, the chairs moved around and even stroke the viewers sitting on them, in coordination with the movie. Additionally, there were light effects, soap bubbles and sometimes even smell spreading.

=== List of movies ===
- Across the Universe (since 2005) – an adventure deep in outer space
- Hocus Science Focus (since 2006) – the scientific ideas behind the famous magic tricks.
- The Human Body Adventure (since 2007) – a journey inside the different systems of our body.
- Fire Ball (since 2009, Hebrew only) – experiencing volcanic eruptions and feeling earthquakes.
- Building the World (since 2009, Hebrew only) – how are skyscrapers built and the scientific principles of building a strong building.
- Learning to Fly (since 2010) – from migrating with birds to flying with airplanes.

Some of the movies were not screened in regular activity days in the museum, but were screened during guided tours for schools:

- Super-Kid (since 2006, Hebrew only) – learning traffic safety through an experiential journey. Originally, this movie was screened on regular activity days.
- Addicted to Life (since 2007, Hebrew only) – how does the body deal with using drugs.

Since 2020 The Cinematrix is closed to the public. In 2023 it was replaced by an immersive digital gallery as part of the new innovation canter.

== Netrix ==
Netrix is an innovative center, and its building was completed in summer 2008. The center which is located in the Education Wing, deals with Internet and the connection between it, technology and the future. A number of screens are placed at the center's entrance, and they present the game “the evolution of the internet”, where the participant observes meaningful events that had to do with the internet in every decade, starting with the 1960s: from the establishment of Microsoft (who is sponsoring the center), through sending the first electronic mail, to the future – then a video clip presents the futuristic lifestyle.

A pole covered in LCD screens is placed in the center of the main hall. The screen present the popular news sites in Israel. On the left side of the room there is a large screen presenting the Google Earth program, by Google (also sponsoring the center). Two Wii consoles, by Nintendo are placed in two different corners of the hall, and they show us that the future is already here. Players can play with just waving their hand or improving their balance (on Wii-fit). Special screen will wait on the floor, and at the moment you step on them they will indicate dangerous surfing or unsafe chatting.

In summer 2011 a PlayStation 3 console, equipped with PlayStation Move motion controller, was added to Netrix, alongside an Xbox 360 console combined equipped with a Kinect sensor, which uses the player's body as a game controller.

- Note: The Netrix center is not active at the moment. It is expected to undergo upgrading and re-open in a new and updated format.
