= Levin House (Tel Aviv) =

House in Tel Aviv, Israel

Coordinates: 32°3′47.35″N 34°46′29.31″E

- בית לוין
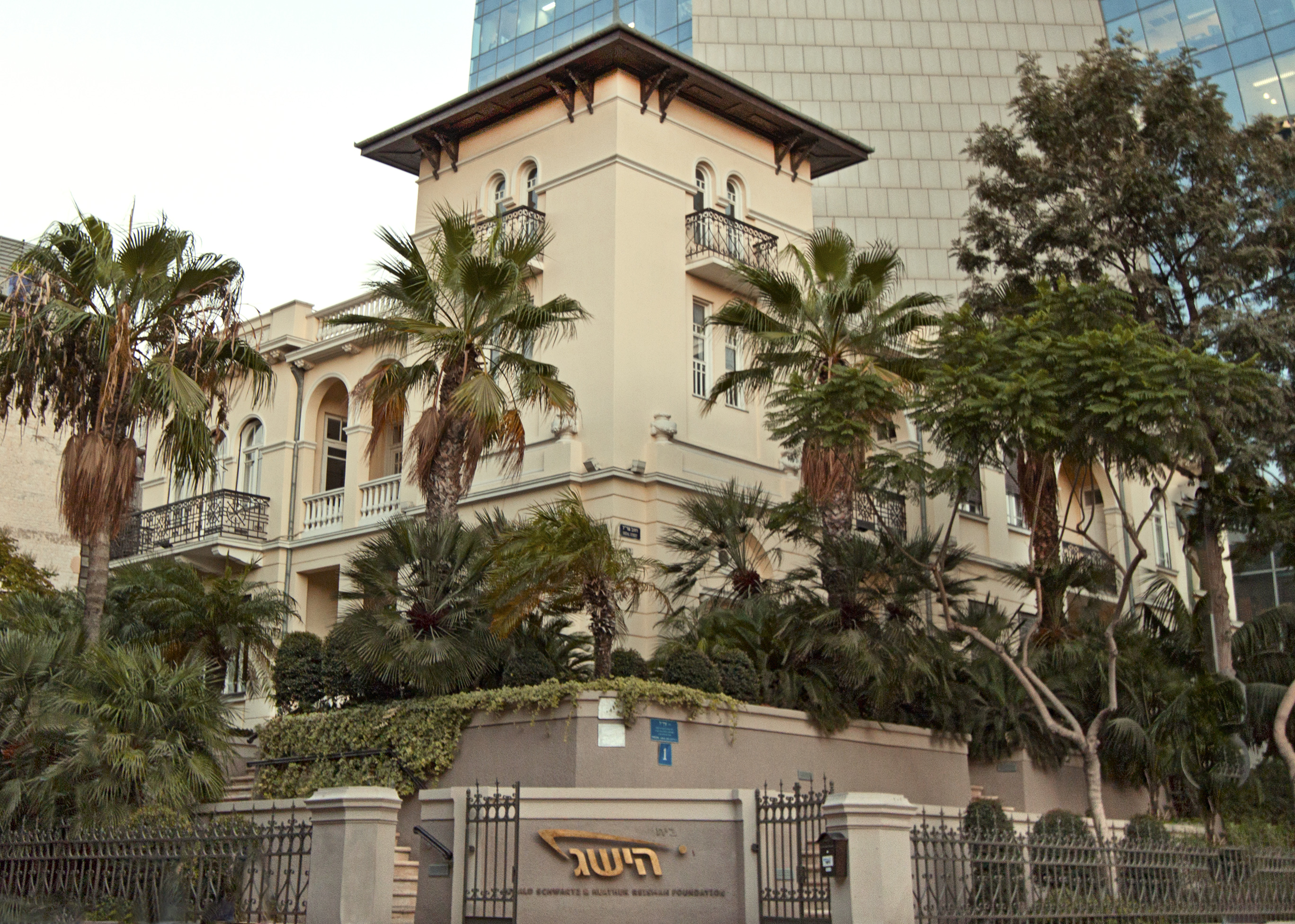
- The Levin House in 2012
- Interactive map of the Levin House area
- Alternative names: The Castle, Russian Embassy House, Sotheby's House, Heseg House

General information
- Status: Completed
- Type: Historic building
- Architectural style: Eclectic, with neoclassical influences
- Location: 46 Rothschild Boulevard, corner of Shadal Street, Tel Aviv, Israel
- Completed: 1924
- Renovated: 1990s
- Owner: Heseg Foundation (current)

Design and construction
- Architect: Yehuda Magidovitch
- Known for: Unique architecture, historical significance, former Soviet Embassy

The Levin House, in Hebrew Beit Levin - Tel Avivians gave it the nickname "the Castle" and later called it the Russian Embassy House - is a historic building located at 46 Rothschild Boulevard on the corner of Shadal Street in Tel Aviv, Israel, and is one of the city's best-known buildings.

Levin House is an eclectic building with some neoclassical influences, which is unique in central Tel Aviv. The building was designed in 1924 by architect Yehuda Magidovitch for a wealthy customer, Zvi Yaacov Levin and his family, and is inspired by the late 19th century Italian vacation homes, a distinctive pointy-roofed tower.

One of the more striking elements of the building is its pointy-roofed tower. During the building's rehabilitation, the crew discovered that the three parts of the tower could be opened by using a special mechanism, and create an opening over the staircase. The mechanism enabled furniture to be moved into the building. It may also have been used by the religiously observant Levine family to create a succah during Sukkot.

== History ==
The house was originally built for the Levin family. It later had several owners throughout the years and, after the establishment of the State of Israel, housed the Soviet Embassy, being known during those years as the Russian Embassy House. On the evening of February 9, 1953, the house was damaged by a bomb placed by three former Lehi activists. The event was used by the Soviet Union as an excuse for suspending diplomatic relations with Israel, claiming that the operation was backed by the Israeli government. Diplomatic relations were renewed after Stalin's death in 1953, only to be suspended again in 1967 due to the Six-Day War, and restored in 1991 as a result of Mikhail Gorbachev's Perestroika reform.

== Since the 1990s ==
After years of neglect, the building went through rehabilitation by architects Amnon Bar Or and Moti Bodek, along with engineer Shmaya Ben Avraham. The conservation was done alongside the construction on the adjacent Alrov Tower (built 1995–99), designed by architects Avraham Yaski and Yosi Sivan. This special construction project, which combines a historic reconstruction with an adjacent skyscraper, has encouraged similar projects nearby. Throughout the 1990s and until 2006, the building housed the offices and showrooms of Sotheby's Auction House, and was renamed Sotheby's House.

In 2006, the house was sold for over 35 million shekels to Gerry Schwartz and Heather Reisman and it is now called Heseg House after the Heseg foundation established by the couple. The house was donated to the philanthropic fund, and after another restoration is used for philanthropic activities, primarily by Heseg – a scholarship fund for former soldiers.

== Sources ==
- Houses From Within (2011-05-20). "Russian Embassy on Rothschild Boulevard". Tour no.75. Archived from the original on 2014-04-13.
