= Hadar HaCarmel =

Neighborhood in Haifa, Israel

Coordinates: 32°48′28″N 34°59′53″E

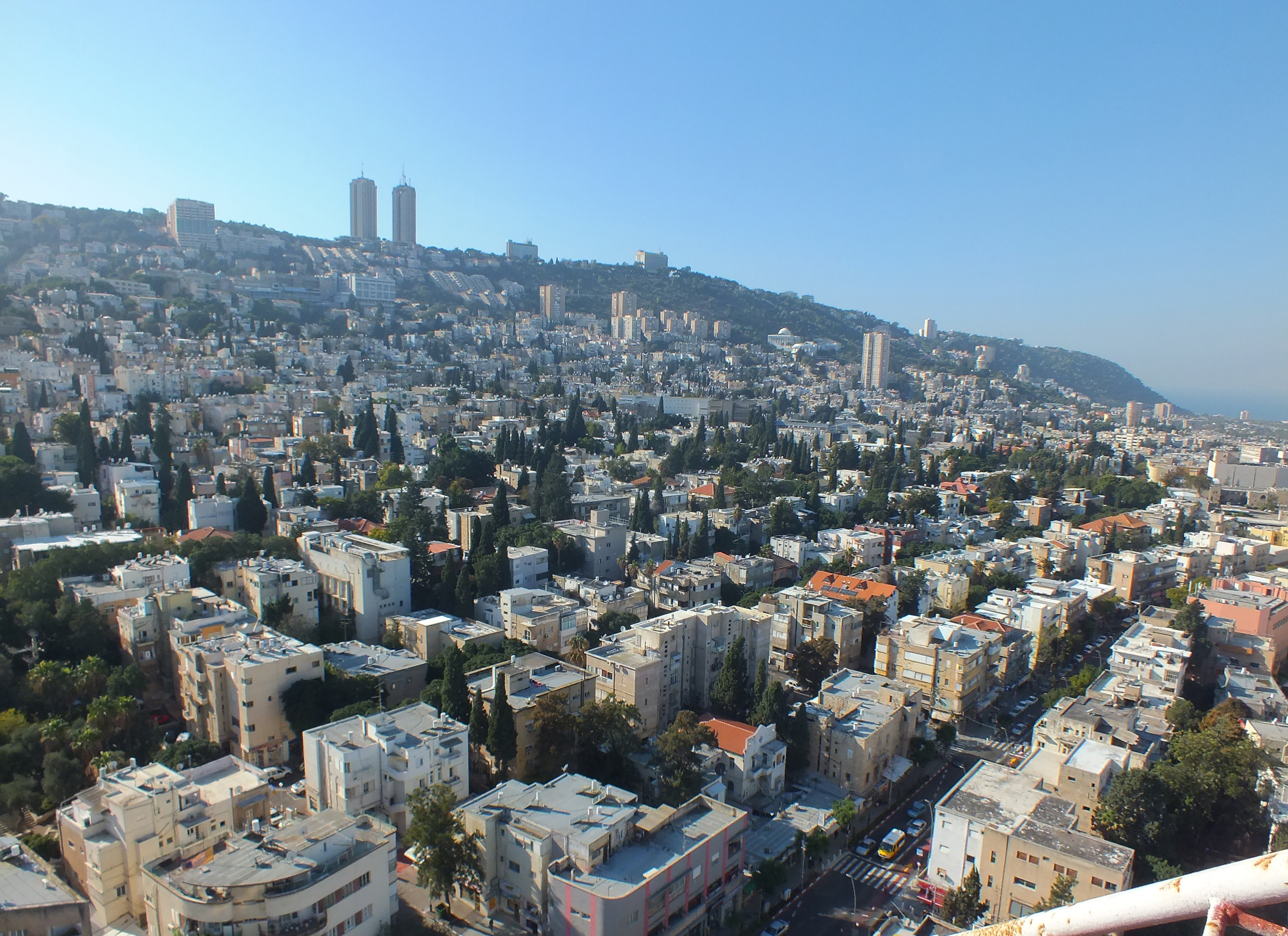
Central Hadar with Herzl Street crossing through the right-hand corner of the image and Binyamin Garden visible to the left

Hadar HaCarmel (Hebrew: הדר הכרמל lit. "Splendor of the Carmel"; or simply known as the neighbourhood of Hadar (Hebrew: שכונת הדר, الهدار in Arabic) is a district of Haifa, Israel. Located on the northern slope of Mount Carmel between the upper and lower city overlooking the Port of Haifa and Haifa Bay, it was once the commercial center of Haifa.

== Etymology ==
The name of the neighborhood is derived from a verse in Isaiah 35:2:

The glory of Lebanon will be given to it, the splendor of Carmel and Sharon; they will see the glory of the Lord, the splendor of our God.

== History ==
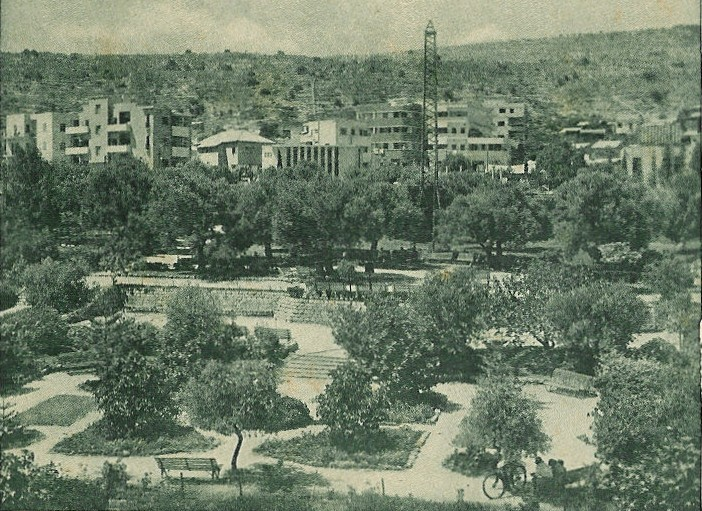
Binyamin Park in 1933

Hadar HaCarmel was founded before World War I. Shmuel Pevzner was one of the founders of the neighborhood and head of its development committee in 1922-1927.

By 1944, most of Haifa's 66,000 Jewish residents lived in the district. Haifa's city hall, courthouse and government buildings were located in Hadar, but relocated to the lower city (Downtown) in the turn of the 21st century.

Hadar has historically been characterized as a Jewish immigrant neighbourhood, with many Holocaust survivors settling in the area, and later, in the early 1990s, absorbing large numbers of newcomers from the former Soviet Union.

== Landmarks ==
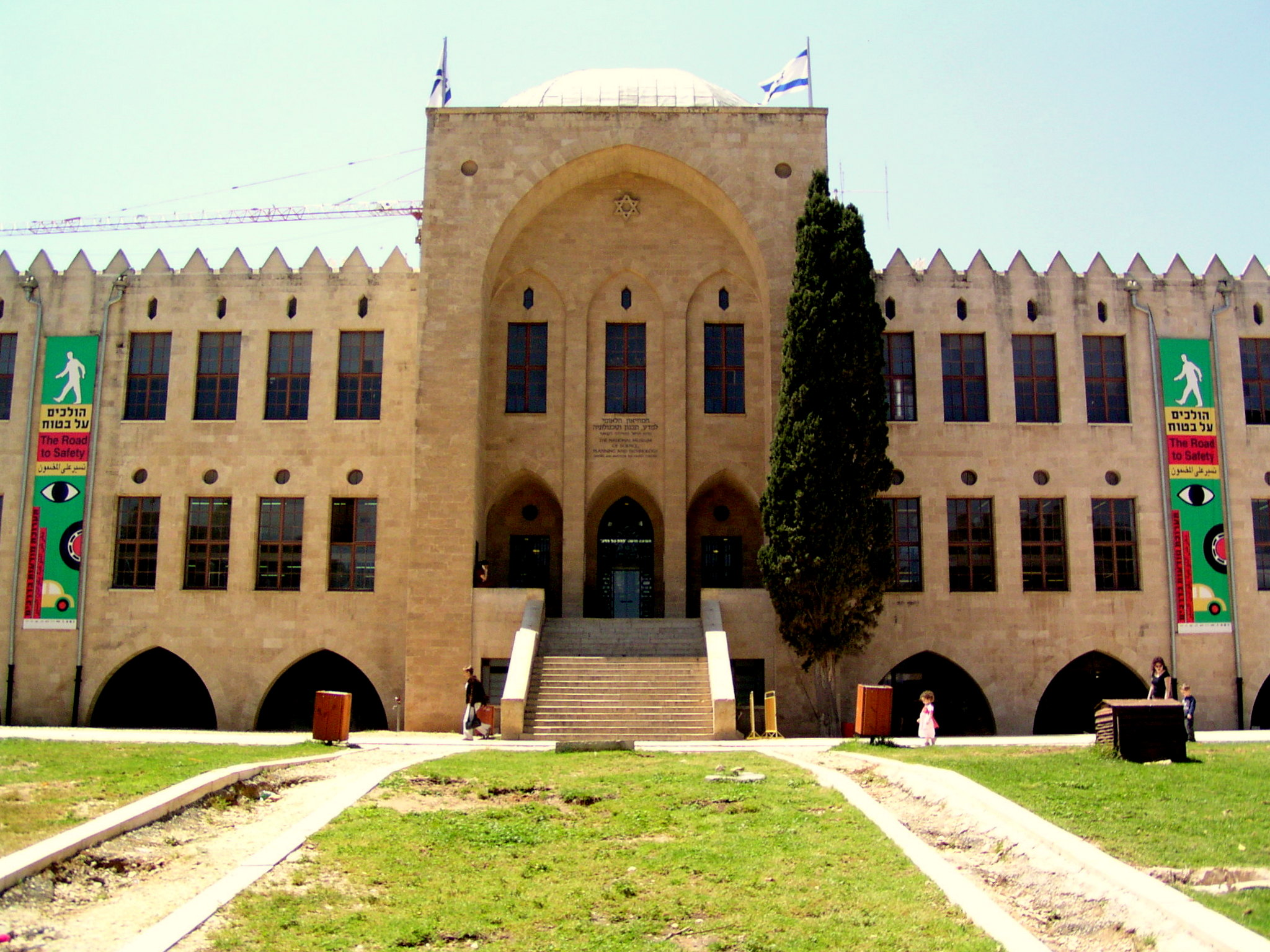
The original building of the Technion, located in the neighbourhood.

The Technion was established in Hadar, and was located there until the new Kiryat HaTechnion ("Technion City") campus was inaugurated in Nave Sha'anan in the late 1970s. The old historic building, dating from 1912, is now a hands-on science museum, the Israel National Museum of Science, Technology, and Space. The Carmelit, Israel's only subway, runs from Carmel Center to Downtown's Paris Square via Hadar HaCarmel, and three of the line's six stations are located in the district. The neighborhood has many Bauhaus buildings designed by German-Jewish architects who settled in Mandatory Palestine after fleeing the Nazis. Hadar is close to Downtown's Wadi Nisnas landmarks, such as Beit HaGefen, an Arab–Jewish cultural center and AlMeidan Arab-language Theater.

== Demography ==
Hadar HaCarmel has roughly 37,200 residents, accounting for 14% of Haifa's population. It is a neighborhood in flux with a large percentage of new immigrants from the former Soviet Union.

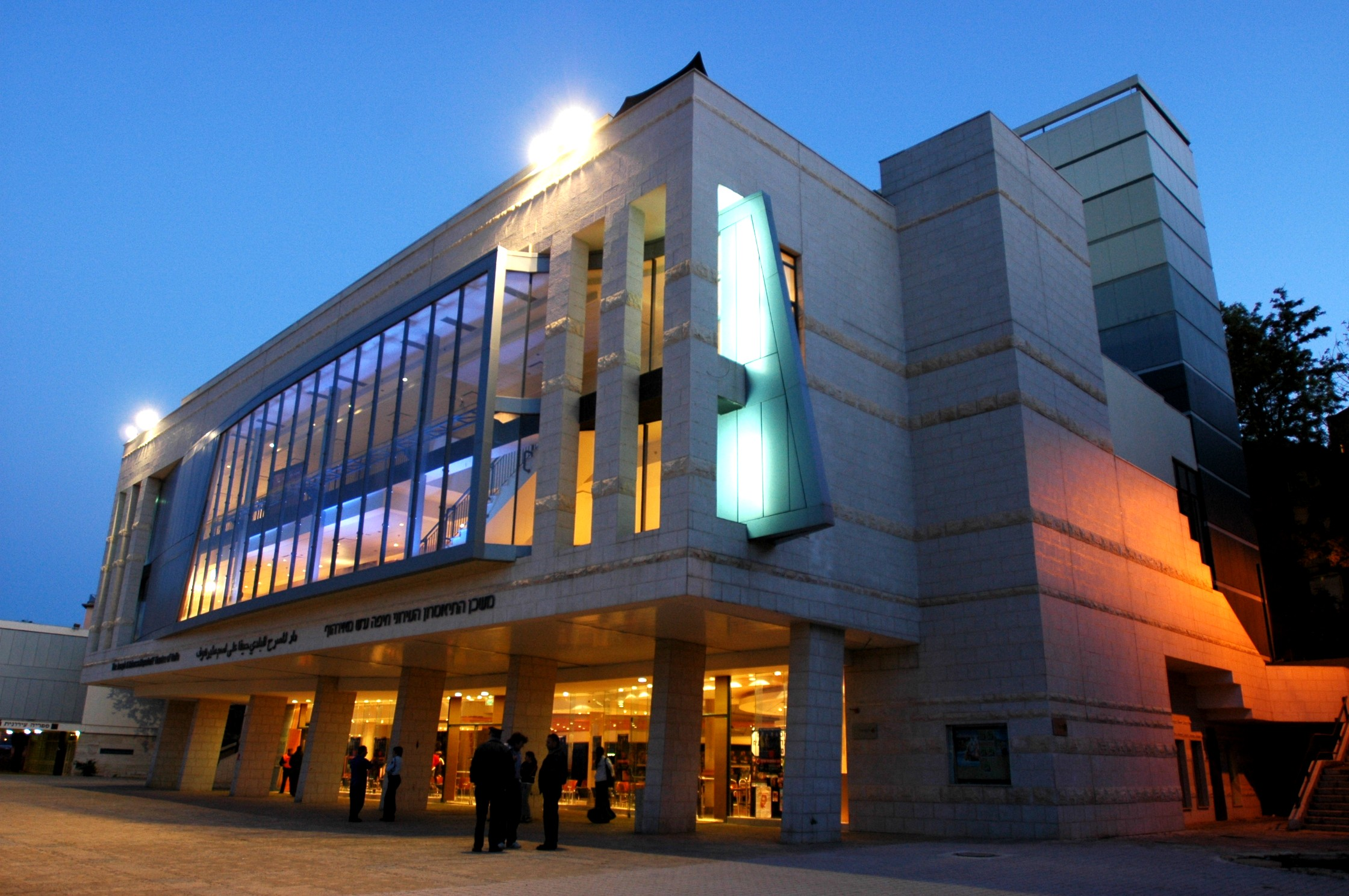
Haifa Theatre

According to the official division by the Haifa municipality, Hadar HaCarmel consists of four sub-districts: Hadar West, Hadar East, Central Hadar and Upper Hadar. Hadar West's population is about 62% Arab, there are also a significant number of wealthy Christian Arabs in Abbas neighbourhood in the Hadar West. The Baháʼí Faith's Shrine of the Báb and Universal House of Justice are located in this sub-district, where nearby many Baháʼís from around the world reside. Upper Hadar, where the Bnai Zion Medical Center is located, is a very heterogeneous community. Central Hadar contains many of Haifa's architectural, cultural and historical landmarks including Haifa Theater, Madatech - the National Science Museum, Binyamin Park and Talpiot Market; today, its population is largely Russian-speaking, making it Haifa's most distinct Russian immigrant neighbourhood, Central Hadar contains also a significant number of Arabs (Muslims and Christians) in H'aneviim, Herzliya neighborhoods and Masada Street. Hadar East is divided into three smaller neighborhoods - Geula, Ramat Viznitz and Yalag, the two former today being largely Haredi and the latter predominantly Arab and Russian.

== Commerce & Culture ==
Hadar Ha Carmel is home to many cultural and commercial businesses:

- The Haifa Municipal Theater which is the first municipal theater company of Haifa established in 1961 by Haifa mayor Abba Hushi and employs both Jewish and Arab actors.
- Israel's National Museum of Science, Technology and Space.
- B'nai Zion Hospital is the second largest hospital in the city also called Rothschild Hospital. The building is close to the Carmelit Bnai Zion Station and enables easy access both for patients and visitors.
- Talpiot Market is housed in the historic Hadar HaCarmel building, which was built in the late 1930s. This is a shuk style market with exotic spices and local food choices.

== See also ==
- Neighborhoods of Haifa
- Wadi Nisnas
