= Shmuel Pevzner =

Russian-born Jewish writer and industrialist

- שמואל יוסף פבזנר
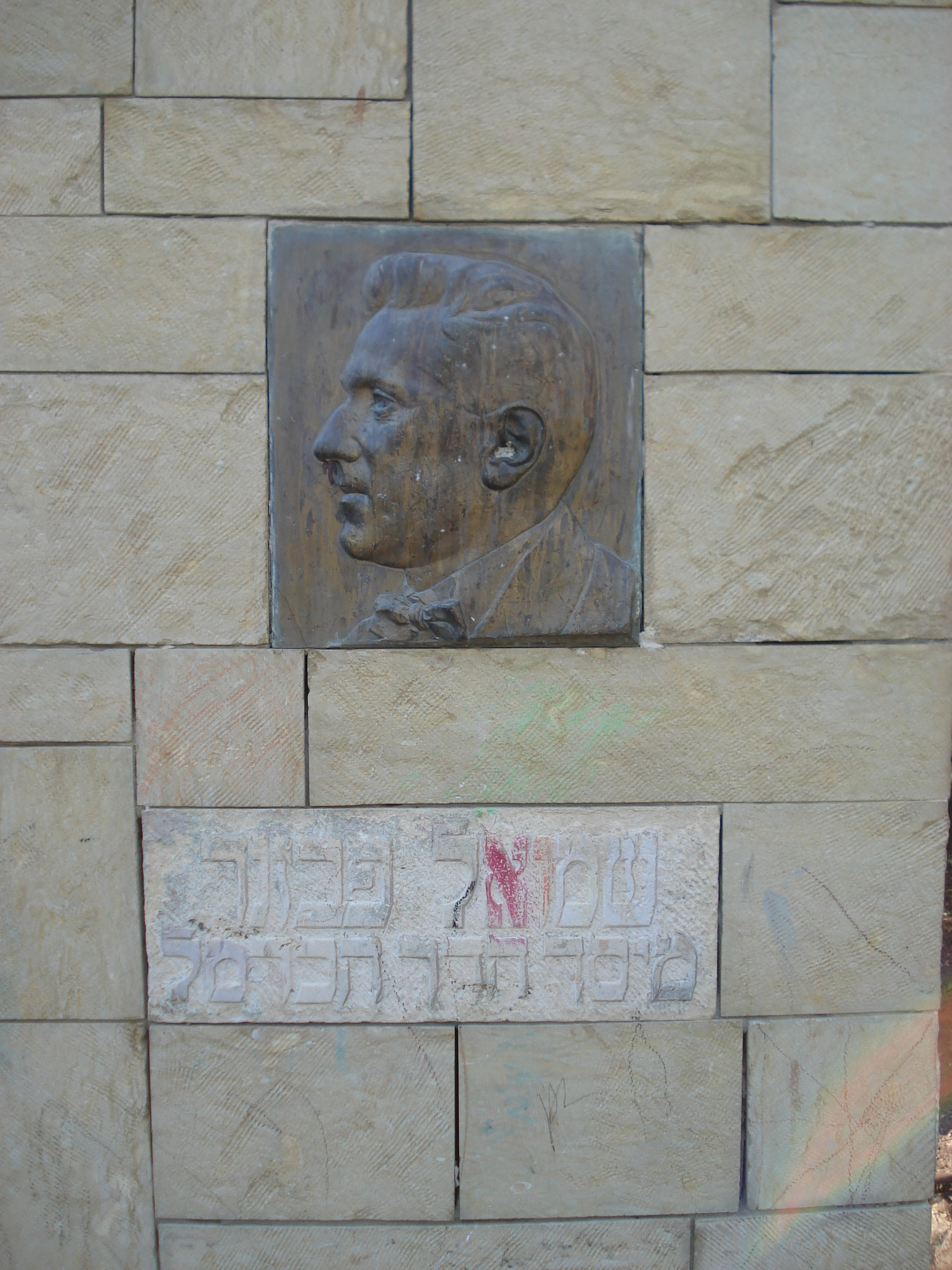
- Memorial moment for Pevzner in a Haifa park
- Born: 17 December 1878; Propoysk, Mogilev Governorate, Russian Empire
- Died: 7 May 1930 (aged 51); Haifa, Mandatory Palestine
- Occupations: Writer, industrialist
- Known for: Founding the Atid soap factory, contributing to the establishment of Technion
- Spouse: Leah Ginsberg
- Relatives: Ahad Ha'am (father-in-law); Shifra Hakohen (sister); Mordechai Hakohen (brother-in-law)

Shmuel Pevzner (Hebrew: שמואל יוסף פבזנר; December 17, 1878 – May 7, 1930) was a Russian-born Jewish writer and industrialist. He was a delegate to the First World Zionist Congress in 1897 and one of the pioneers of settlement in Eretz Israel.

== Biography ==
Shmuel Pevzner was born in Propoysk. He received a traditional Jewish education and then studied engineering at the Berlin Technical Institute, graduating in 1903. At the age of 18, he attended the First Zionist Congress in Basel as its youngest delegate. In 1905, he immigrated to Ottoman Palestine.

Pevzner married Leah Ginsberg, daughter of Ahad Ha'am. Pevzner's sister, Shifra, married the Jewish writer Mordechai Hakohen.

== Business and public career ==
In 1909, Pevzner established the Atid soap factory in Haifa, which employed 100 workers. He was one of the founders of the Hadar Hacarmel neighbourhood in the city and played a key role in the establishment of the Technion in April 1912. Pevzner served in the Haifa municipality and was a delegate to the Assembly of Representatives (Asefat HaNivkharim).

== Awards and recognition ==
Pevzner Street in Haifa is named after him.
