= Keren Pevzner =

Azerbaijani-Israeli writer and teacher

- קרן פבזנר
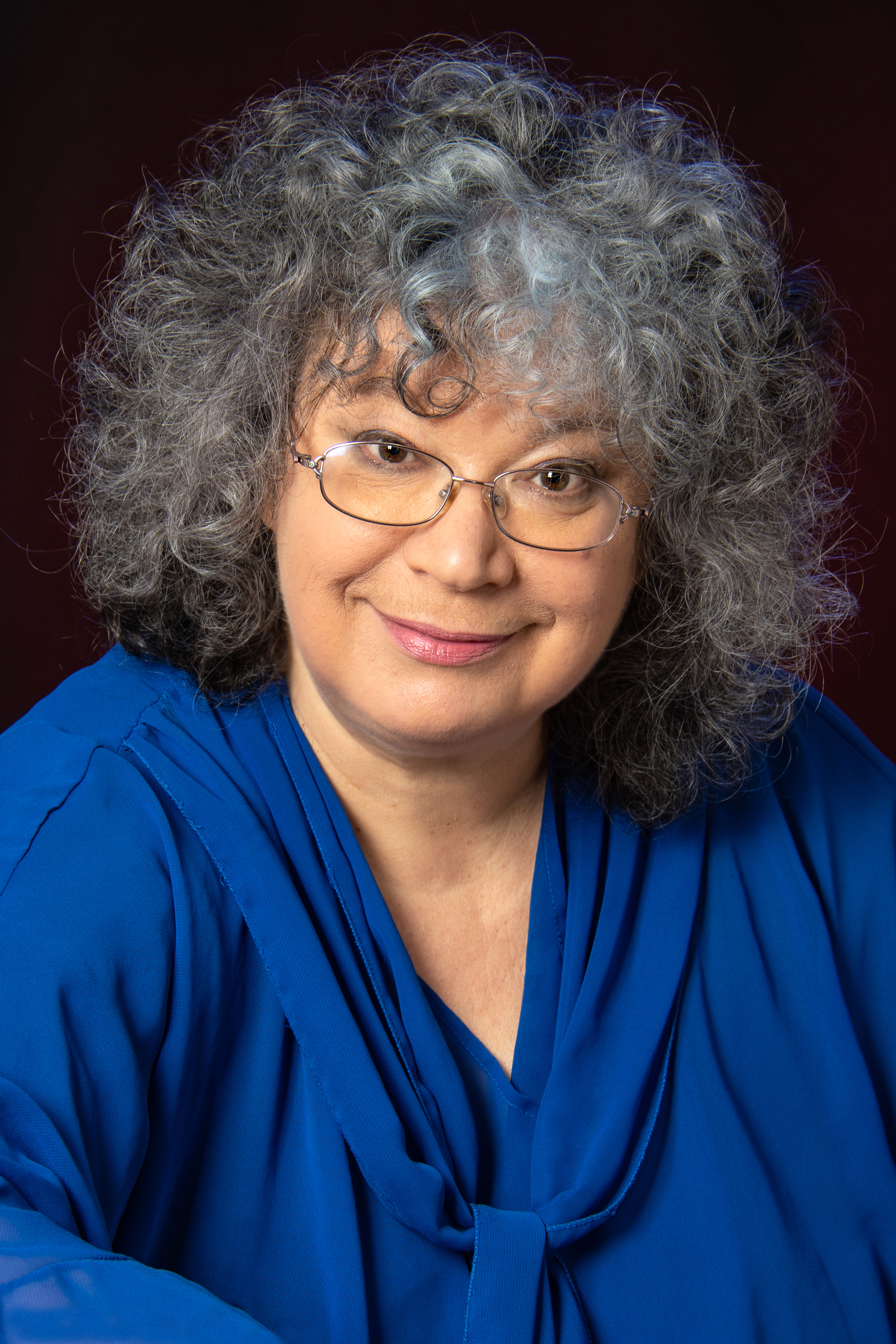
- Pevzner in 2021
- Born: Kira Konovalova; May 8, 1961 (age 64); Baku, Azerbaijan SSR
- Other names: Katerina Vrublevskaya
- Occupations: Writer, teacher, translator, blogger

Keren Pevzner (Hebrew: קרן פבזנר, née Kira Gennadievna Konovalova; born May 8, 1961, in Baku, Azerbaijan SSR), also known by her pen name Katerina Vrublevskaya as vintage crime fiction author, is an Israeli novel and essay writer, Hebrew and computer science teacher, translator, author of a number of textbooks, cookbooks, and encyclopedias, and blogger. In the past, she was a Coordinator in the Ministry of Aliyah and Integration, as well as an employee in Israel's Social and Economic Development Program.

== Biography ==
Keren Pevzner was born Kira Konovalova on May 8, 1961, in Baku. She comes from an old family of Bakuvian oil engineers. Her great grandfathers were European specialists of Jewish and German descent who, at the invitation of Zeynalabdin Taghiyev, participated in the development of Caspian oil fields conducted by Branobel. One of them, Johann (Ivan Aleksandrovich) Maderwax worked together with Gustav Wilhelm Richard Sorge, a German mining engineer and the father of Soviet spy Richard Sorge. Maderwax later took a job with the Caspian Steamship Company. In 1938, he fell victim of the Great Purge and was executed.

Pevzner attended the 20th Secondary School in Baku, after which she enrolled in, and graduated with a degree in electrical engineering, the Azerbaijan State Oil and Industry University where her grandmother and both parents have studied previously. After graduation, she was given a job at the AzerElectroTherm scientific production association (Russian: НПО «АзерЭлектроТерм»).

Pevzner immigrated to Israel in 1990, together with her second husband and her eldest son. She tried a variety of trades, among which kibbutz worker, grocery store owner, Hebrew teacher and Ministry of Aliyah and Integration employee. Currently, she resides in Ashkelon and as her primary occupation teaches at the Сollege of Computer science for Israeli public employees. Additionally, she publishes literature and writes educational works.

As a delegate, she attended the Conference of the Azerbaijan-Israel Friendship Society.

Since 2008, Pevzner writes the "Culinary commentary" column on Booknik, a Russian-language internet publication on Jewish literature and culture. She blogs on LiveJournal under the pen name "Kirulya of Ashkelon" (Russian: Кируля Аскалонская) as well as on TikTok.

Pevzner has two sons and two granddaughters.

== Works ==
According to Pevzner, she undertook her first attempts at writing when she was around eight years old. Her first published book was The Parallel Ulpan, a Hebrew self-teaching guide in two volumes, published in 1997 by the Miry Publishing Company. Pevzner spent two years writing the book after a suggestion from Daniel Kluger, a writer who attended her course. The Parallel Ulpan found success as a plain language self-teaching textbook for Russian-speaking immigrants (and later for members of the diaspora as well, for example, in Russia and Canada), and went through at least eleven editions.

Pevzner's first work of fiction was a crime story, The Murderer's Confession. It was written in 1999 and published the same year in the Iskatel' magazine.

== Cumulative bibliography ==
=== Fictional works ===
==== Crime Fictions ====
Crime fiction series of Valeriya Vishnevskaya (were published in Iskatel and Iskatel's World Magazines):

- the novel, The Murderer's Confession (Исповедь убийцы) — Iskatel Magazine, 3-1999.
- the story, The Real Estate Tax (Налог на недвижимость) — Iskatel's World Magazine, 6-1999.
- the story, The Purely Jewish Murder (Чисто еврейское убийство) — Iskatel Magazine, 10-1999.
- the story, The Pilgrim's Death (Смерть пилигрима) — Iskatel Magazine, 1-2000.
- the story, The Saxofonist's Death (Смерть саксофониста) — Iskatel's World Magazine № 4 за 2000 год.
- the story, Her Last Cruise (Её последний круиз) — Iskatel's World Magazine № 10 за 2001 год.
- the story, The Lamp of Pharaoh (Светильник фараона) — Iskatel Magazine № 2 за 2004 год.
- the story, Seeking Out/In Search of a Golem (В поисках Голема) — (2004).

Vintage Crime Fiction Novels of Apollinariya Avilova

- The Apollinariya Aviliva's First Case (Первое дело Аполлинарии Авиловой) — Prosodiya Publishing Company (2002, 50.000 copies). Later, the novel was reissued in Book Club 36,6 Publishing Company in Crime Fiction by Woman’s Pen series (2005, 5.000 copies, ISBN 5986970152).
- The Case of Lost/Vanished Talisman (Дело о пропавшем талисмане) — Prosodiya Publishing Company (2003, 50.000 copies, ISBN 5835800096). Reissued in Book Club 36,6 Publishing Company (2006, 5.000 copies).
- The Case of Antique Portrait (Дело о старинном портрете) — Book Club 36,6 Publishing Company (2006, 5.000 copies, ISBN 5986970284).
- The Case of Rubies of Queen of Sheba (Дело о рубинах царицы Савской) — was issued together with the novel The Crown/Tiara of King Saitafern by Boris Vorobyov in World Classic series (Iskatel's World) in Iskatel Publishing Company (2006, 2700 copies, ISBN 5894870135). Later, the novel was issued in Ivrus Publishing (Tel Aviv, 2008).

==== Science fiction ====
- Windy City (Город Ветров) — Miry Publishing Company (Jerusalem, 2000).

==== Collections of op-ed essays ====
- Notice to a Beginning Mistress/Concubine… and all sorts of odds and ends (Памятка начинающей любовнице… и всякая всячина)
- Keren Spins Yarns… (Studies of Life, Love, and Faraway Lands) (Керен рассказывает… (этюды о жизни, любви и дальних странах))

=== Books of Specialized Subjects ===
(by default, all the books were issued by SeferIsrael, Tel Aviv)

==== Hebrew and Israeli records management textbooks, phrasebooks, language for specific purposes/subject oriented/specialized dictionaries (Russian↔Hebrew) ====
- Self-teaching textbook The Parallel Ulpan (Параллельный ульпан), ISBN 9657197090 — the original edition of 1997. It went through eleven editions at least. Since the third edition, was enhanced with the second volume in the form of reading-book under the editorship of Prof. Baruh Podolskiy. The total print is 22.000 copies at least.
- May I Ask (Позвольте спросить) phrasebook — Miry Publishing Company (1998), reissued by SeferIsrael in 2003 (ISBN 9657197112) and 2009.
- The Mini Sihon (Mini Сихон) phrasebook (ISBN 9789657197127, 2004)
- The Super Sihon (Super Сихон) phrasebook (ISBN 965-7197-00-7) under the editorship of A.Solomonik; by the year 2009 went through six editions.
- The Electrician Dictionary (2010)
- The Programmer Dictionary (2010)
- The Accountant Modern Dictionary
- The Musical Dictionary
- Please Meet the FORM (practical suggestions/tips) (ISBN 9657197074; two issues in 2002 and 2010)
- Please Meet the FORM (practical suggestions/tips) (two issues)
- Microsoft WORD In Hebrew And In Russian (2012)

==== The Popular Encyclopedies ====
- The Jewish Names (2002, ISBN 9657197066)
- Israeli Fish Dishes (2007, ISBN 9657197414)
- The Israel Healthful And Kitchen Herbs encyclopedia (seven issues, ISBN 9657197228)
- Israeli Salads (three issues, ISBN 9657197376)
- Israeli Juices (2009, ISBN 9657197457)
- How They Eat in Israel? (Как едят в Израиле?) (2010, ISBN 9657197481) — the collection of essays originally published at the «Booknik»
