= Alexander Baerwald =

German architect (1877–1930)

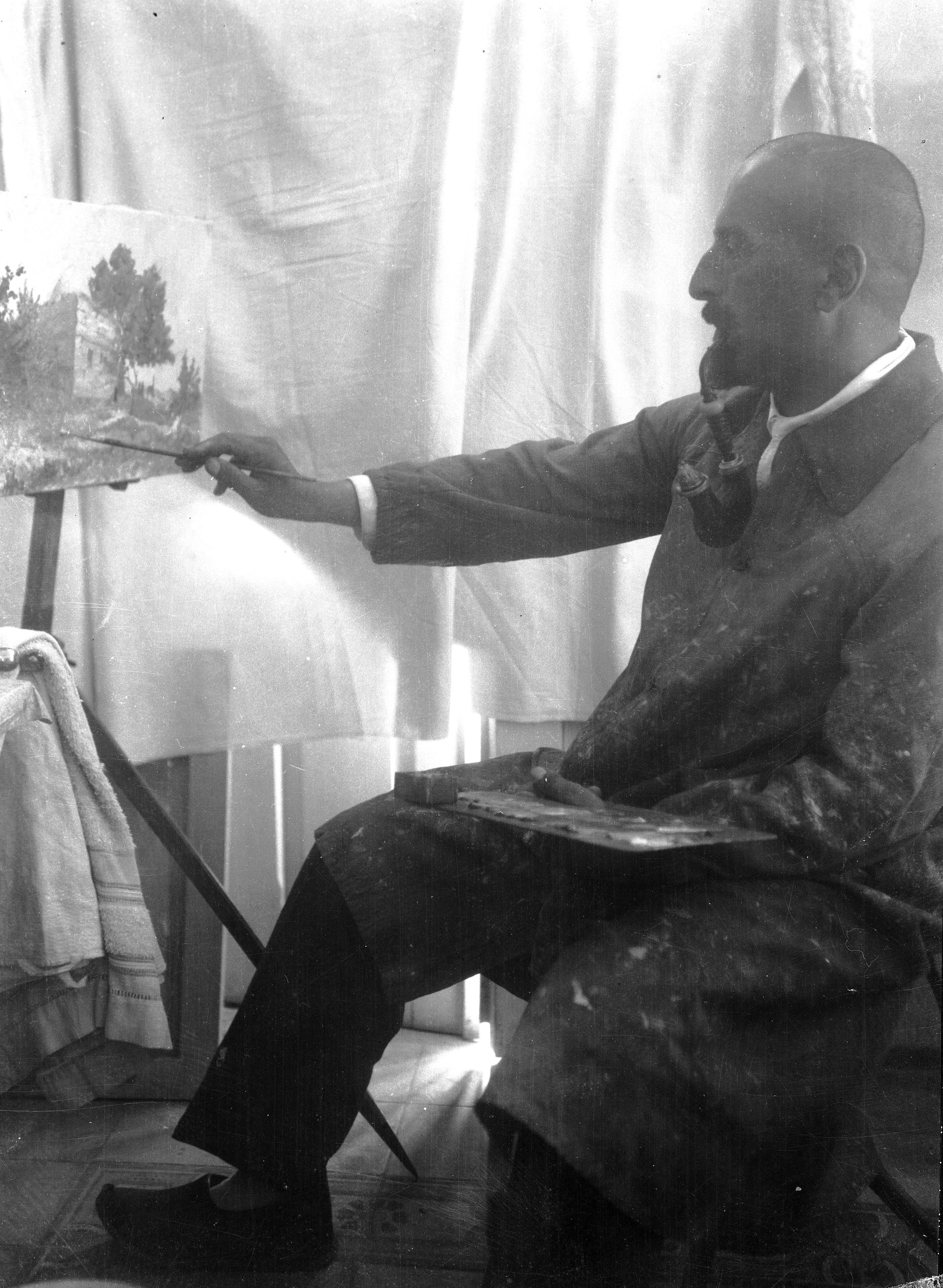
- Alexander Baerwald painting
- Born: אלכסנדר ברוולד; 3 March 1877; Berlin, Germany
- Died: 27 October 1930 (aged 53); Haifa, Mandatory Palestine
- Education: Technische Universität Berlin; Technical University of Munich
- Occupation: Architect
- Spouse: Lotte Eisenberg
- Awards: Schinkel Prize
- Buildings: Technion Campus, Haifa; Merhavia (the courtyard complex); Anglo-Palestine Bank, Haifa; Prussian Royal Library, Berlin; Central Hospital, Afula

Alexander Baerwald (Hebrew: אלכסנדר ברוולד; 1877–1930) was a German Jewish architect best known for his work in Haifa, today in Israel, during Late Ottoman and British rule.

== Life and career ==
Baerwald was born in Berlin, Germany on 3 March 1877. He studied at the Technische Hochschule in Charlottenburg (now Technische Universität Berlin, 1897–1901), interrupted by the summer semester 1898 at the Technische Hochschule of Munich. From 1903 to 1927 he was employed with the Prussian Construction and Financial Direction of Berlin, responsible for public constructions in Berlin. He advanced to become a Royal Ministerial Construction Councillor (German: Königlicher Ministerialbaurat). One of his tasks was the construction management for the new building of the Prussian Royal Library (German: Königliche Bibliothek) in Berlin between 1908 and 1913. The building known for its Neo-Baroque architecture, following a design of the popular Wilhelmine architect de:Ernst von Ihne and adapted by Baerwald, is now the House I of the State Library at Berlin of Prussian Cultural Heritage (German: Staatsbibliothek zu Berlin - Preußischer Kulturbesitz), at Unter den Linden street. His work in the German capital continued with the design of several other buildings in the early 1910s, including his own villa in Berlin-Dahlem (1912).

Around 1912, Baerwald moved temporarily to Ottoman Palestine, where he began work in Haifa. Baerwald is best known for designing the Technion University campus in Haifa between 1912 and 1924, for which he had been employed by the de:Hilfsverein der deutschen Juden (lit. "German-Jewish Relief Association"). He also designed the neighbouring Beit Sefer haReali (German: Realgymnasium), a school preparing students for the Technion. Today the old Technion building forms part of the Israel National Museum of Science, Technology, and Space. He became a professor of architecture at the Technion throughout much of his later life and he made a significant contribution to the Prussian-style discipline in the country's higher education institutions.

In 1915 he built the moshav of Merchavya after his own designs. In 1924 he designed the Anglo-Palestine Bank department in Haifa, now operating as Bank Leumi le-Israel. He also designed numerous other buildings in Palestine, and by 1925 Baerwald had settled there permanently. In Palestine Baerwald was acclaimed for introducing German-style architecture for institutions of higher education. Baerwald also designed the Central Hospital in Afula (1928), and the Philips House in Haifa (1929–30), his last built project.

Alexander Baerwald died on 27 October 1930 in Haifa. He was buried at the Jewish cemetery on the Mount of Olives in Jerusalem.

== Gallery ==
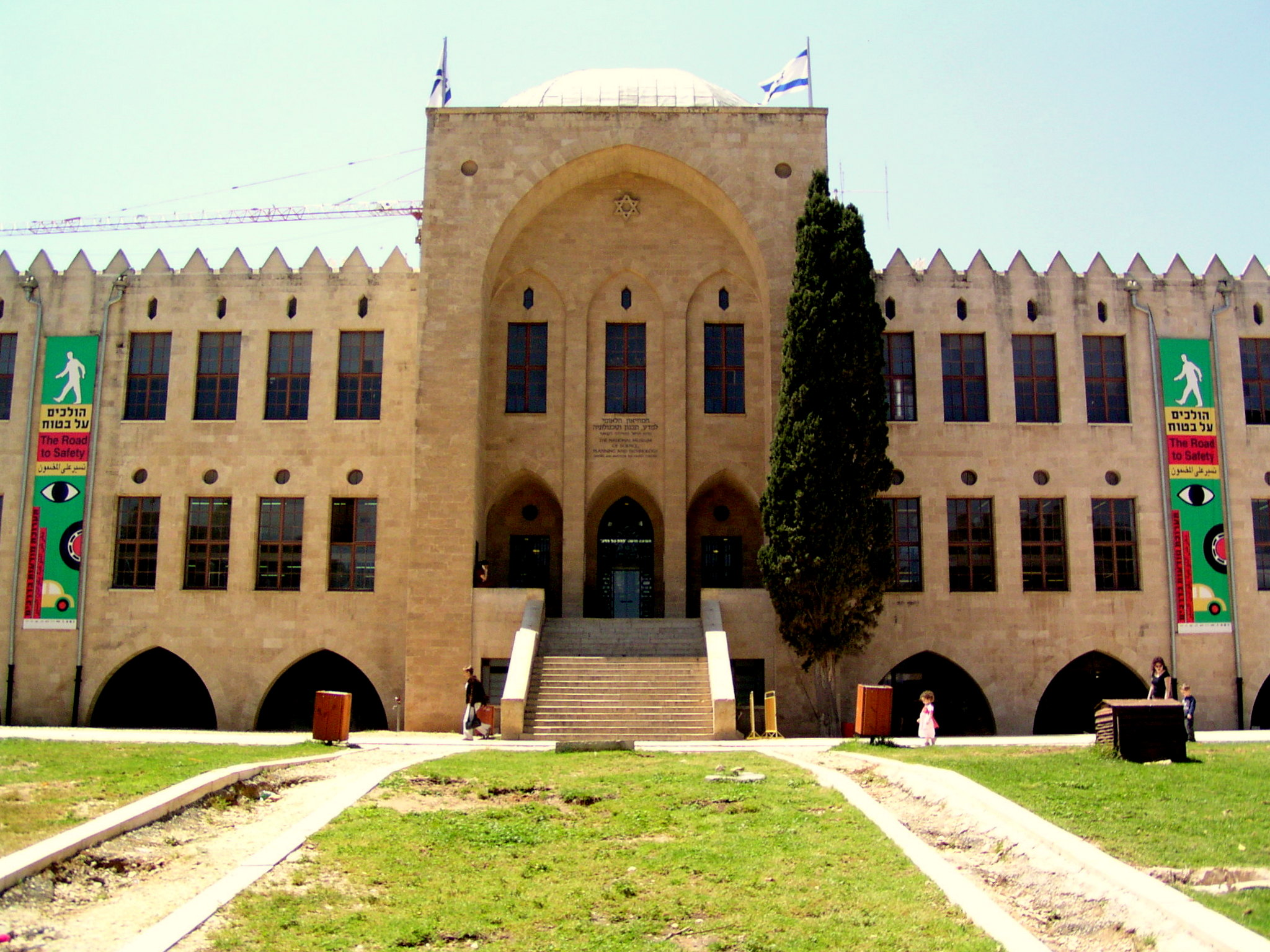
First building of the Technion (designed 1912–1924), now The Israeli National Museum of Science, Technology and Space, Haifa

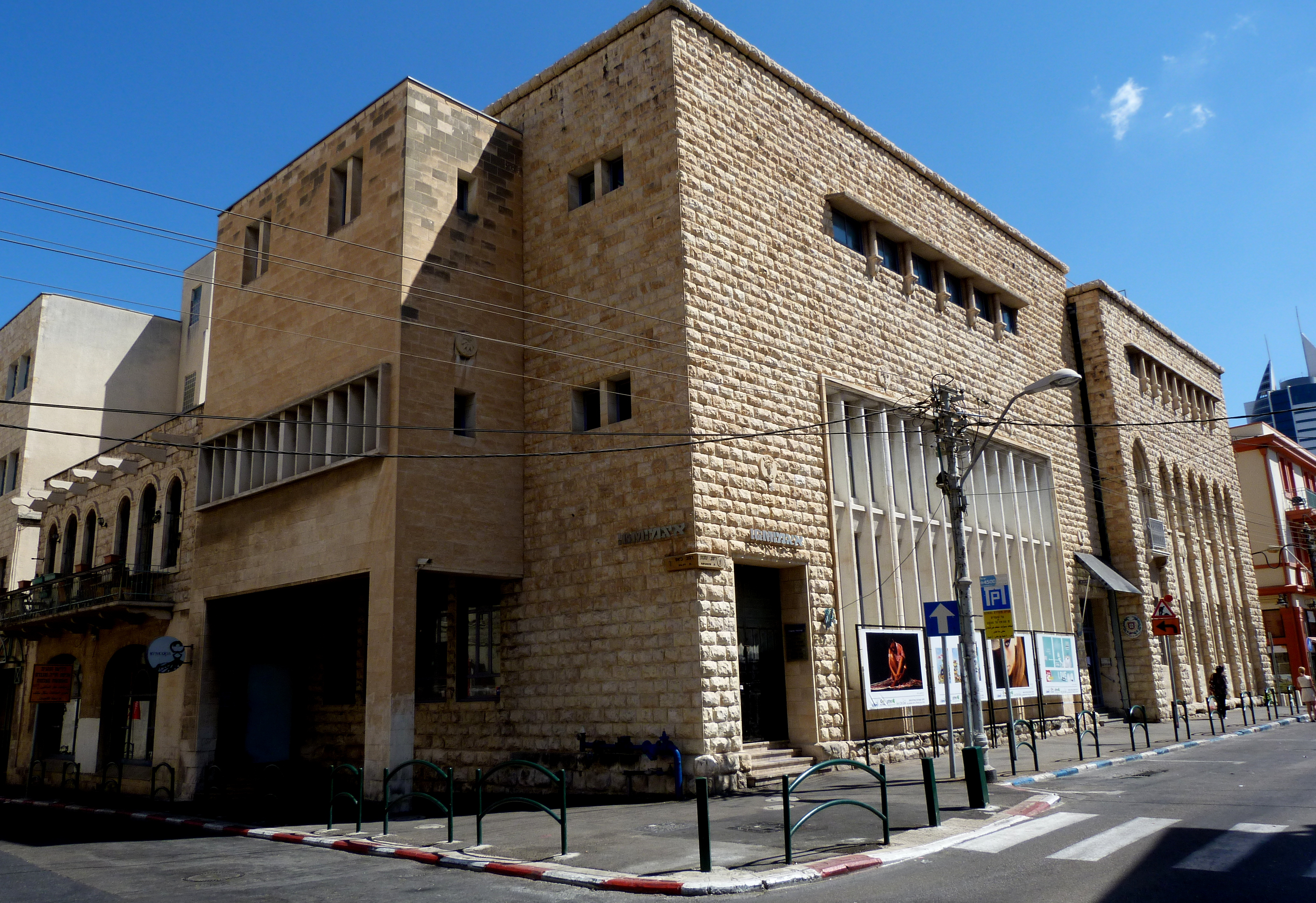
Former Anglo-Palestine Bank, Haifa

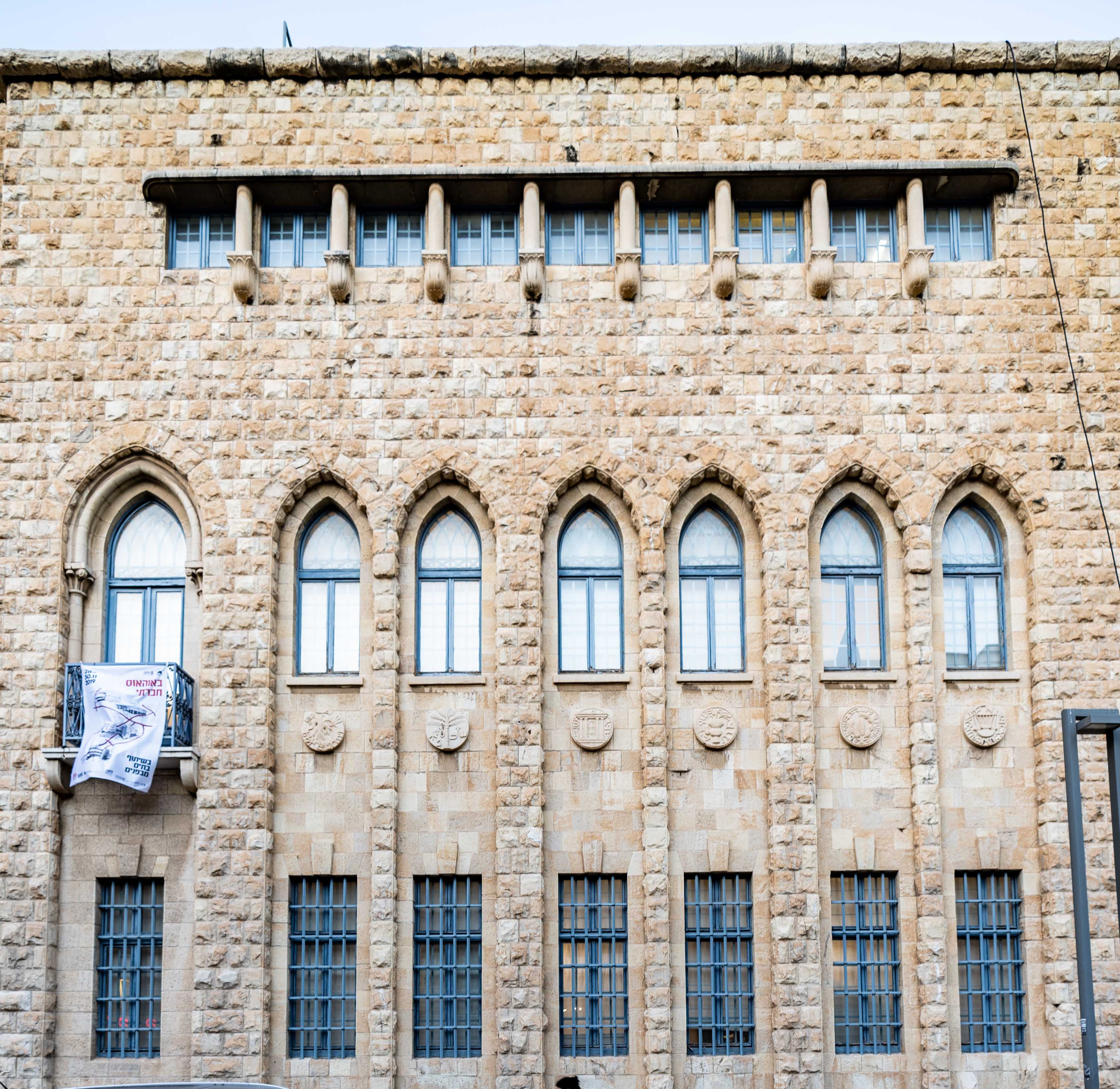
Former Anglo-Palestine Bank; facade

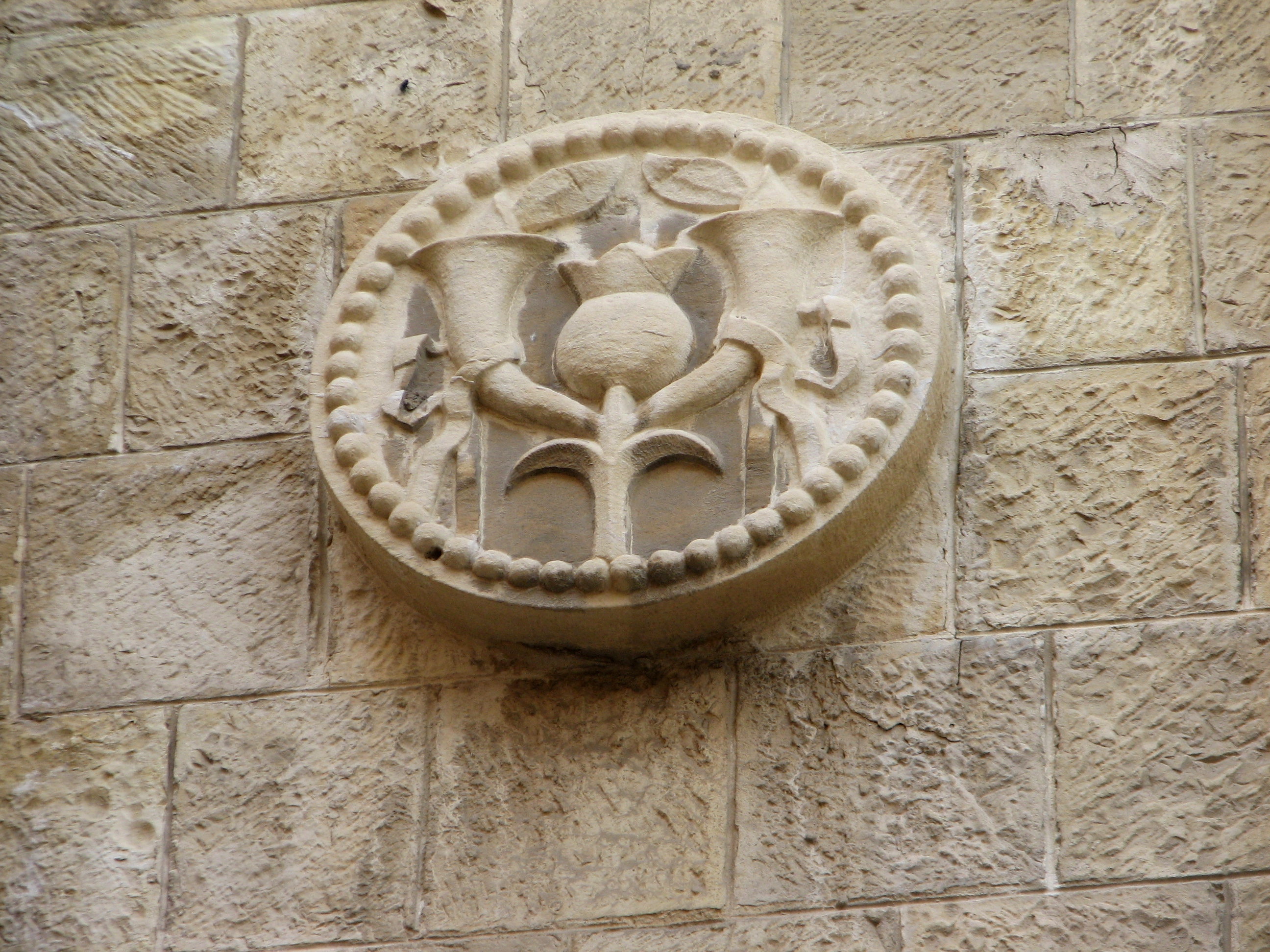
Former Anglo-Palestine Bank; facade medalion: pomegranate

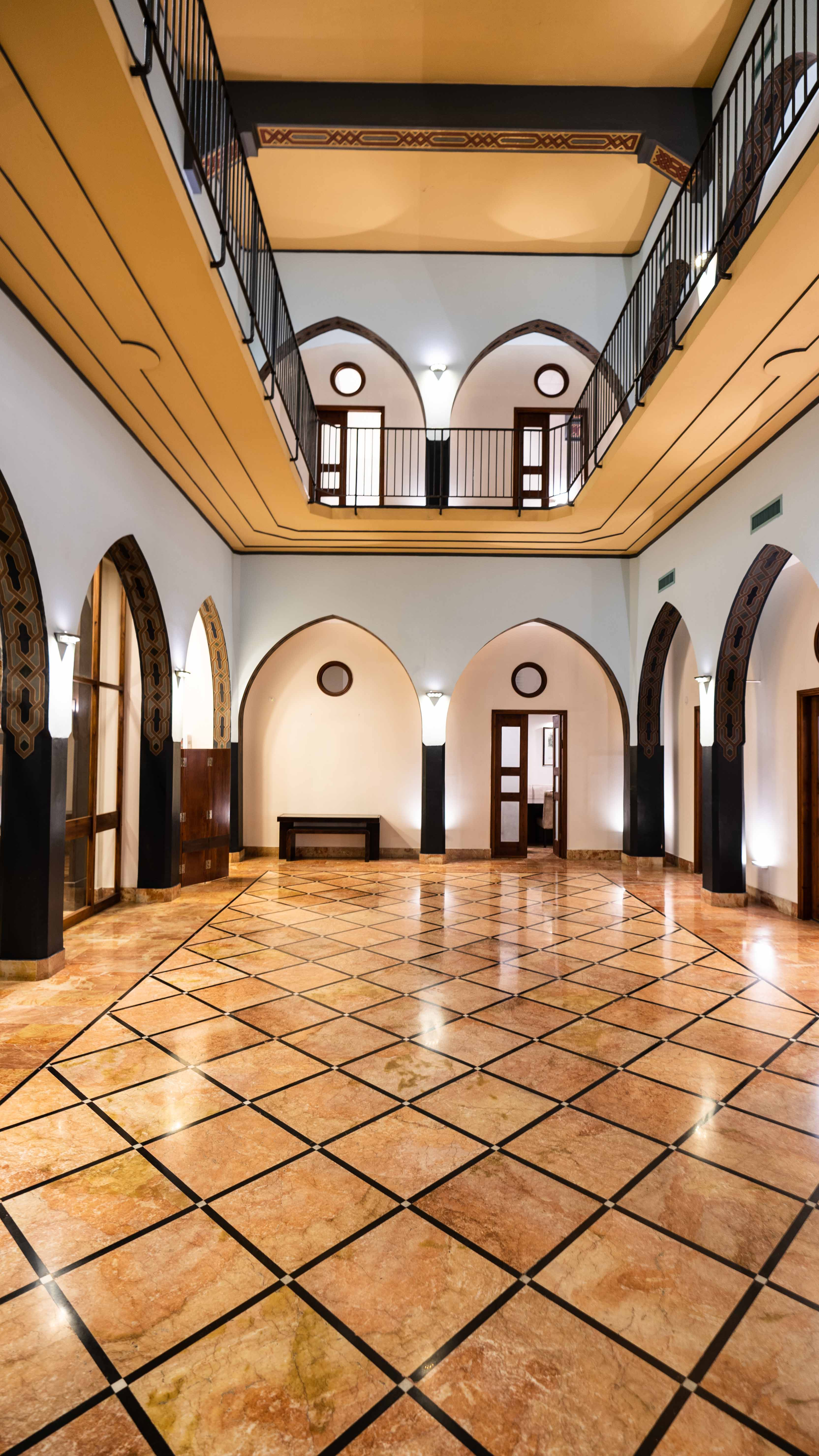
Former Anglo-Palestine Bank; interior

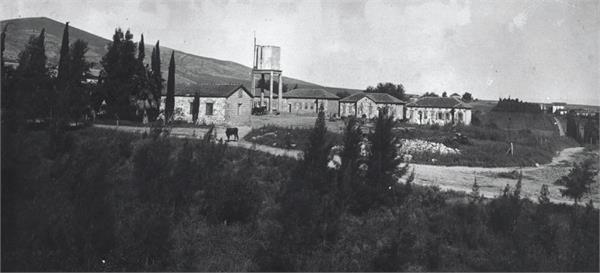
Merhavia (1929)

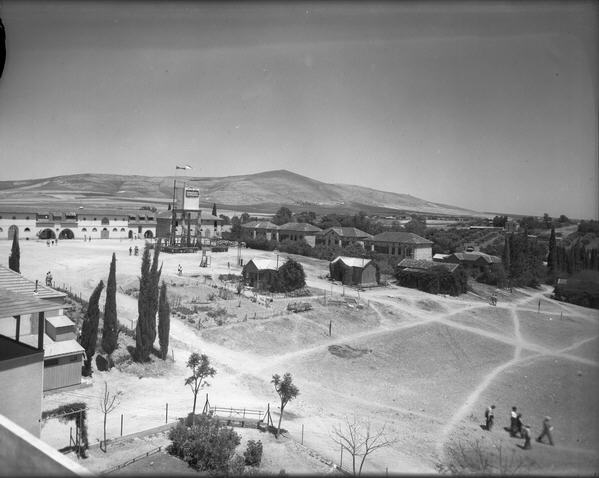
Merhavia (1941)

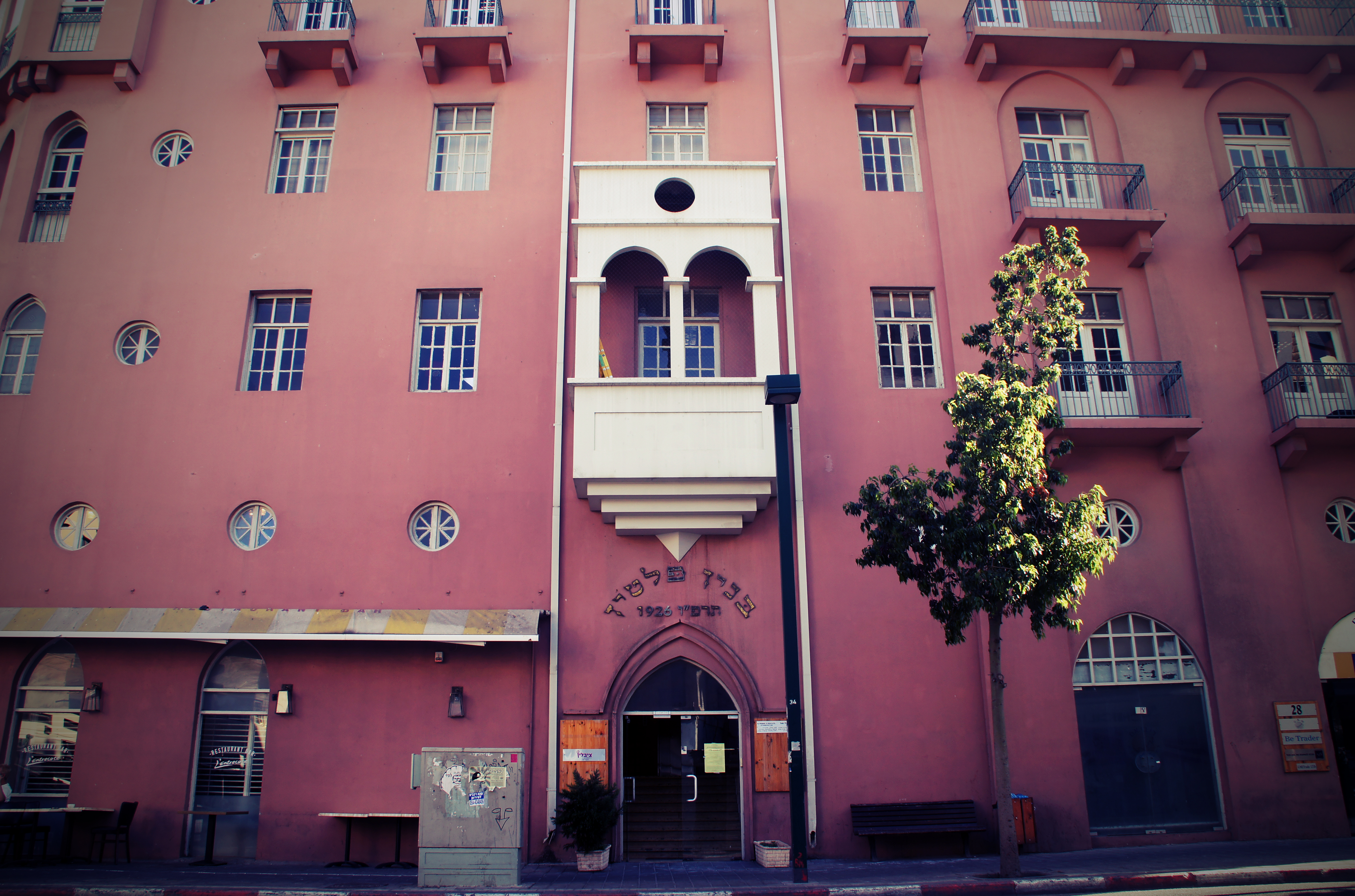
Former Palatin Hotel, Tel Aviv (opened 1926; restored and expanded as office building, 1990s)
