= Paris Square =

Paris Square can mean:

- Paris Square (Haifa), a city square in Haifa
- Paris Square (Jerusalem), a city square in Jerusalem
- Pariser Platz, a city square in Berlin
- Paris Square (Rio de Janeiro), a city square in Brazil
