= Haifa Pride =

Annual LGBT event in Haifa, Israel

Haifa Pride מצעד הגאווה בחיפה
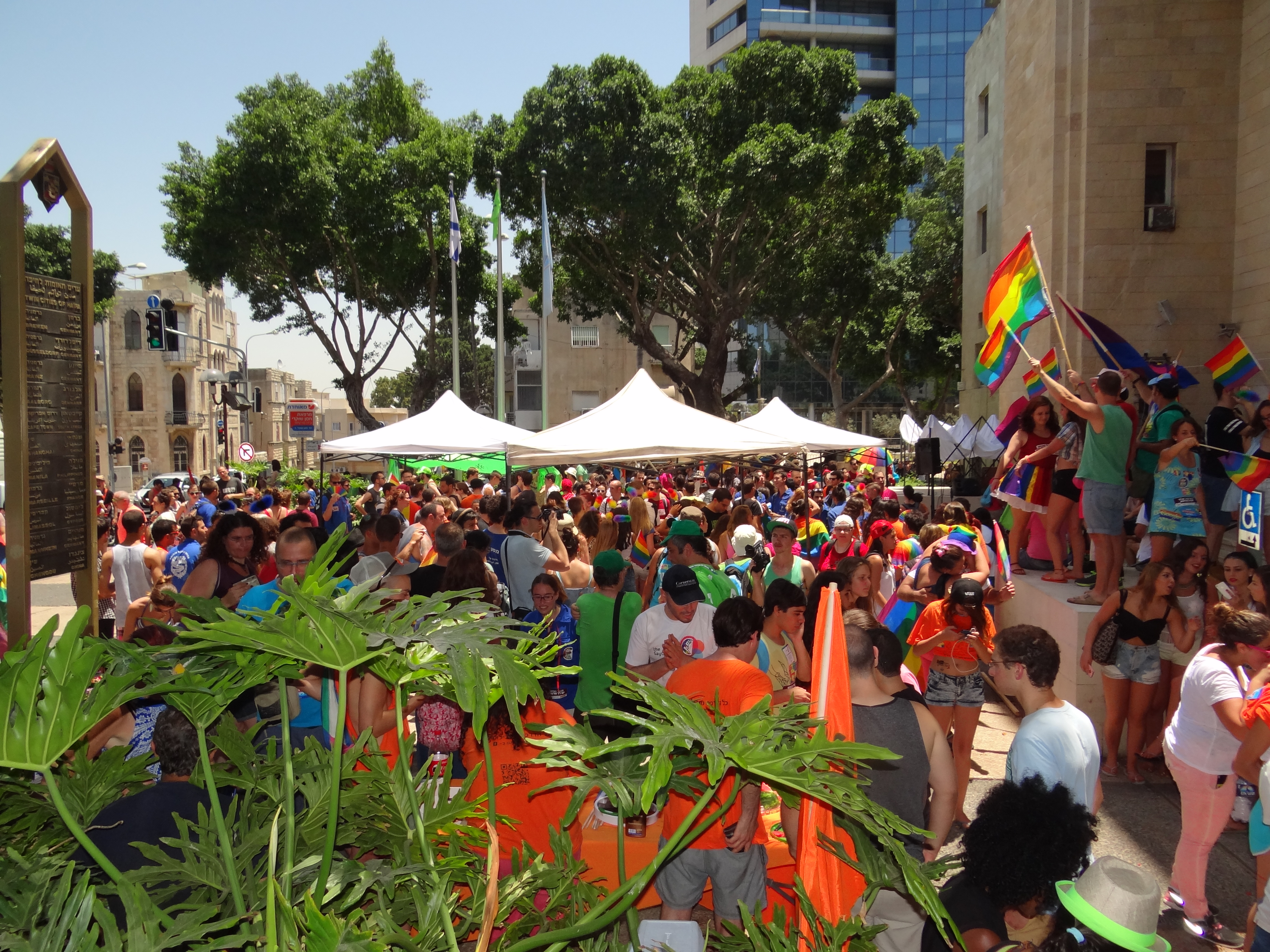
- Pride marchers at Haifa City Hall in 2014
- Frequency: Annually
- Location: Haifa
- Country: Israel
- Inaugurated: 2007
- Participants: 3,000 people

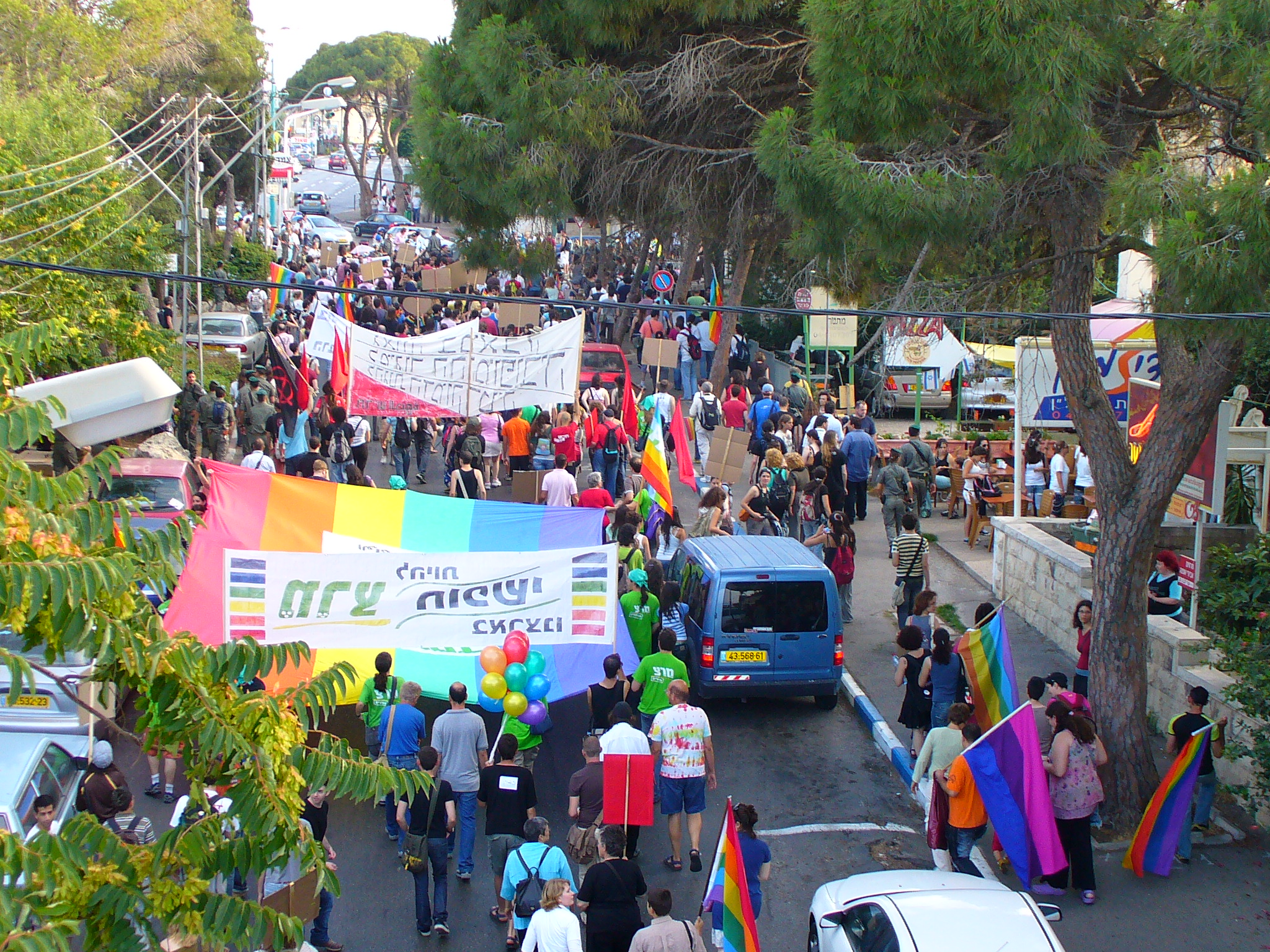
Haifa Pride 2007

Haifa Pride (Hebrew: גאוות חיפה; Arabic: فخر حيفا) is an annual event which takes place in Haifa, Israel, in celebration of the LGBTQ community, was first hold in 2007. The main event is the Pride Parade which was attended by 3,000 people in 2016, including the city's mayor, Yona Yahav. The 3 kilometer long parade route culminates in Gan HaEm Park in Haifa's Merkaz HaCarmel neighborhood on Mount Carmel.

== History ==
=== 2003–2009 ===
In 2003, the Haifa LGBT Forum organized the city's first motorized pride parade. Days prior to the event, Israeli attorney, politician and columnist Yosef Paritzky delivered remarks at the opening of Haifa's pride festivities. Since 2007, an annual pride march has been held, traversing the streets of central Carmel and culminating in a rally at Gan HaEm Park. Starting in 2008, the parade has been organized in cooperation with the Haifa Municipality. The parades have been heavily secured by police and faced relatively mild protests from segments of the city's religious community.

=== 2010 ===
In 2010, about a thousand people marched in the Haifa parade, and Mayor Yona Yahav gave a speech from the podium at the closing rally, which was met with boos and protests from a number of activists in the audience. He was the second mayor in Israel's history to speak at a Pride parade.

=== 2011 ===
In 2011, the parade was the first to take place along President Boulevard, a route of approximately 800 metres that offered greater visibility than the Yefe Nof Promenade used in previous years.

=== 2014 ===
The 2014, Haifa Pride Parade moved to the Hadar HaCarmel neighbourhood, proceeding along HaNevi’im and Herzl Streets before concluding at the Haifa Municipality building, where a large public festival of performances was held.

=== 2021 ===
The 2021 Haifa Pride Parade, also referred to as "We Are All Haifa" march, took place on 18 June 2021 and was formally launched by Mayor Einat Kalisch-Rotem.

=== 2023 ===
The 2023 Haifa Pride Parade took place on 15 June 2023 as part of the 2023 Israeli judicial reform protests. With an estimated attendance of over 6,000 people, it was the largest pride march ever held in the city. The event opened with a minute’s silence in memory of Sarit Ahmed, who had been murdered the previous week because of her sexual orientation. The parade was headed by Israeli pop singer Dana International.

During the march, Israeli police arrested three transgender participants. One arrestee had been carrying a Palestinian flag. Police reported that the individual had assaulted an officer, whereas multiple eyewitnesses disputed that claim. In its official statement, the police misgendered the detainees, and the detainees later alleged that officers used misogynistic, homophobic and transphobic slurs during the arrest.

== See also ==
- LGBT rights in Israel
- LGBT history in Israel
- Jerusalem gay pride parade
- Tel Aviv Pride
