= Merkaz HaCarmel =

Coordinates: 32.8056°N 34.9869°E

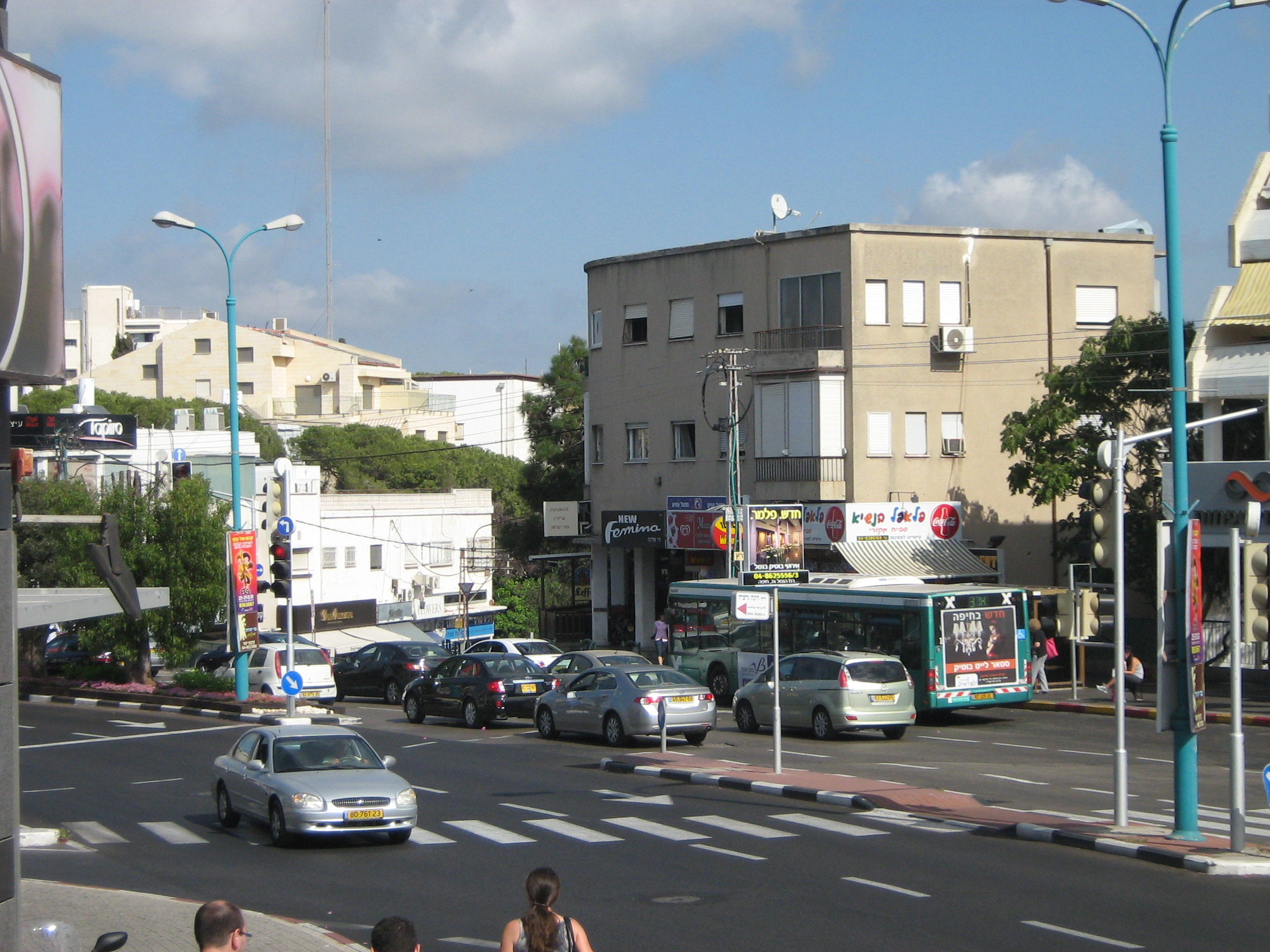
HaNassi Avenue, the main street through Merkaz HaCarmel

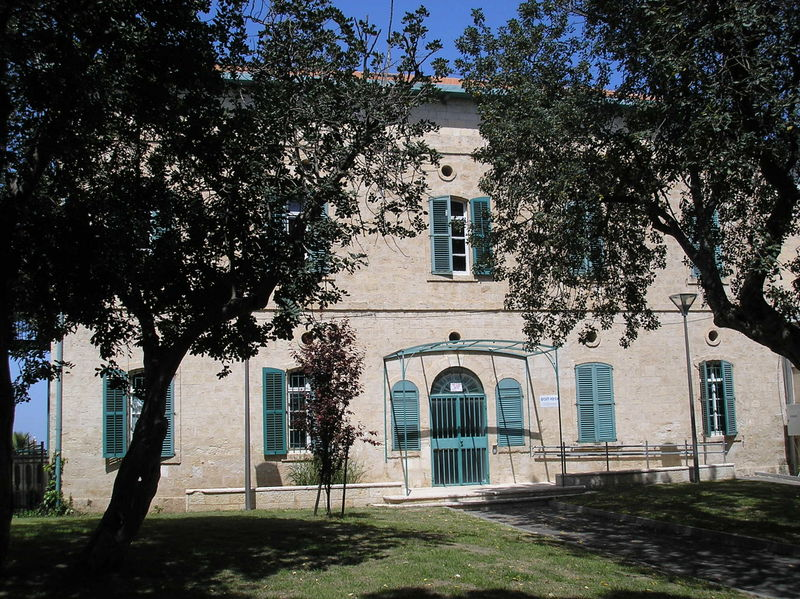
Bet Hecht (formerly the Rothschild house), adjacent to the Haifa Auditorium

Merkaz HaCarmel (Hebrew: מרכז הכרמל, romanized: Merkaz HaCarmel, lit. 'Carmel Center'), is a neighborhood, and cultural and recreation area on the slopes of Mount Carmel in Haifa, Israel, covering roughly 680 dunams on the upper part of the mountain.

Largely uninhabited until the late 19th century, the area was settled following German Templer activity on the mountain and land purchases after the First World War, developing into a Jewish residential neighborhood surrounded by gardens. Since the establishment of the State of Israel it has developed into one of Haifa's more affluent residential and commercial districts, centered on HaNassi Avenue; at the end of 2019 it had a population of about 4,231.

The neighborhood is home to several of Haifa's hotels, including the Dan Carmel, the city's first luxury hotel; its principal park, Gan HaEm, dating to 1913; and Haifa Zoo. It also hosts a concentration of the city's cultural institutions, among them the Tikotin Museum of Japanese Art, the Mané-Katz Museum, the Moshe Shteklis Museum of Prehistory, the Munio Gitai Weinraub Architecture Museum, the Haifa Auditorium, and the Haifa Cinematheque. The Louis Promenade, opened in 1992 along Yefe Nof Street, offers views over Haifa Bay and leads to the upper entrance of the Hanging Gardens of Haifa.

HaNassi Avenue, the neighborhood's main commercial street, is lined with shopping centers, restaurants, and European-style cafés, and the area includes several schools, health clinics, and other public institutions. Merkaz HaCarmel is served by the Carmelit funicular's Gan HaEm and Carmel Center stations, as well as by the Metronit bus rapid transit network.

== Geography ==
Merkaz HaCarmel occupies roughly 680 dunams (68 hectares) on the upper slopes of Mount Carmel.

According to the Haifa Municipality's socio-economic research center, the neighborhood's boundaries are:

- East: the streets Kish, Yefe Nof, and Wedgwood, at Rotary Square
- North: Henrietta Szold Street, Yefe Nof Street, and the Louis Promenade
- West: the junctions of Iris and Daphna streets with HaNassi Avenue, and of HaTzofim Street with Derekh HaYam, together with the full length of Nitzanim Street and Zvi Avenue
- South: the junction of Wolfson and Moriah streets

As of the end of 2019, the neighborhood had a population density of about 13 residents per dunam.

== Demographics ==
According to Haifa Municipality data, Merkaz HaCarmel had a population of about 4,231 residents at the end of 2019, comprising 1,998 men and 2,233 women. In 2017 the municipality's socio-economic index ranked the neighborhood 8.5 out of 10, placing it among the city's more affluent areas. A 2022 report on the neighborhood attributed its relatively older population in part to housing prices that have become largely unaffordable for younger residents.

== History ==
Until the mid-19th century Mount Carmel was largely uninhabited, except for temporary accommodation of shepherds and hermits, because it was far from the coast – and the walled Old Haifa. Ownership of the land was divided between the state, the Carmelite Order, and residents of the Arab village of Al Tira (which is today the city of Tirat Carmel). The mountain became famous for its uneven road, known as the "High Road" (as opposed to the "Lower Road" now called "Derekh Hahagana").

During the 19th century the Carmelite Order acquired estates in Stella Maris and Wadi Siach. German Templer settlers established a colony on Mount Carmel in the late 19th century, known as "Carmelheim", marking the beginning of the area's development. After the First World War, the Israel Land Development Company ("Hachsharat HaYishuv") purchased land in the area, leading to its development as a Jewish neighborhood surrounded by gardens, as it remains today.

== Merkaz HaCarmel today ==
=== Landmarks and institutions ===
Since the establishment of the State of Israel, the Merkaz HaCarmel neighborhood has developed into one of Haifa's more affluent residential areas, with shopping centers and local businesses including many European-style cafes, and several hotels and museums. Haifa Zoo began around 1948–1949 as a small animal corner founded by naturalist Pinchas Cohen in the basement of a synagogue on Derekh HaYam Street. complaints from worshippers about the noise led to its relocation, in 1952, to its present site on the slope below Gan HaEm garden. The station Gan HaEm is the upper terminus of the Carmelit funicular subway system. The Carmelit was built in the late 1950s and runs down Mount Carmel from Merkaz HaCarmel to Paris Square in downtown Haifa.

The Haifa Auditorium was established in 1974, and the Haifa Cinematheque in 1975. The Louis Promenade, built in 1992, runs adjacent with Yefe Nof Street and offers views over Haifa Bay and the city.

=== Hotels ===
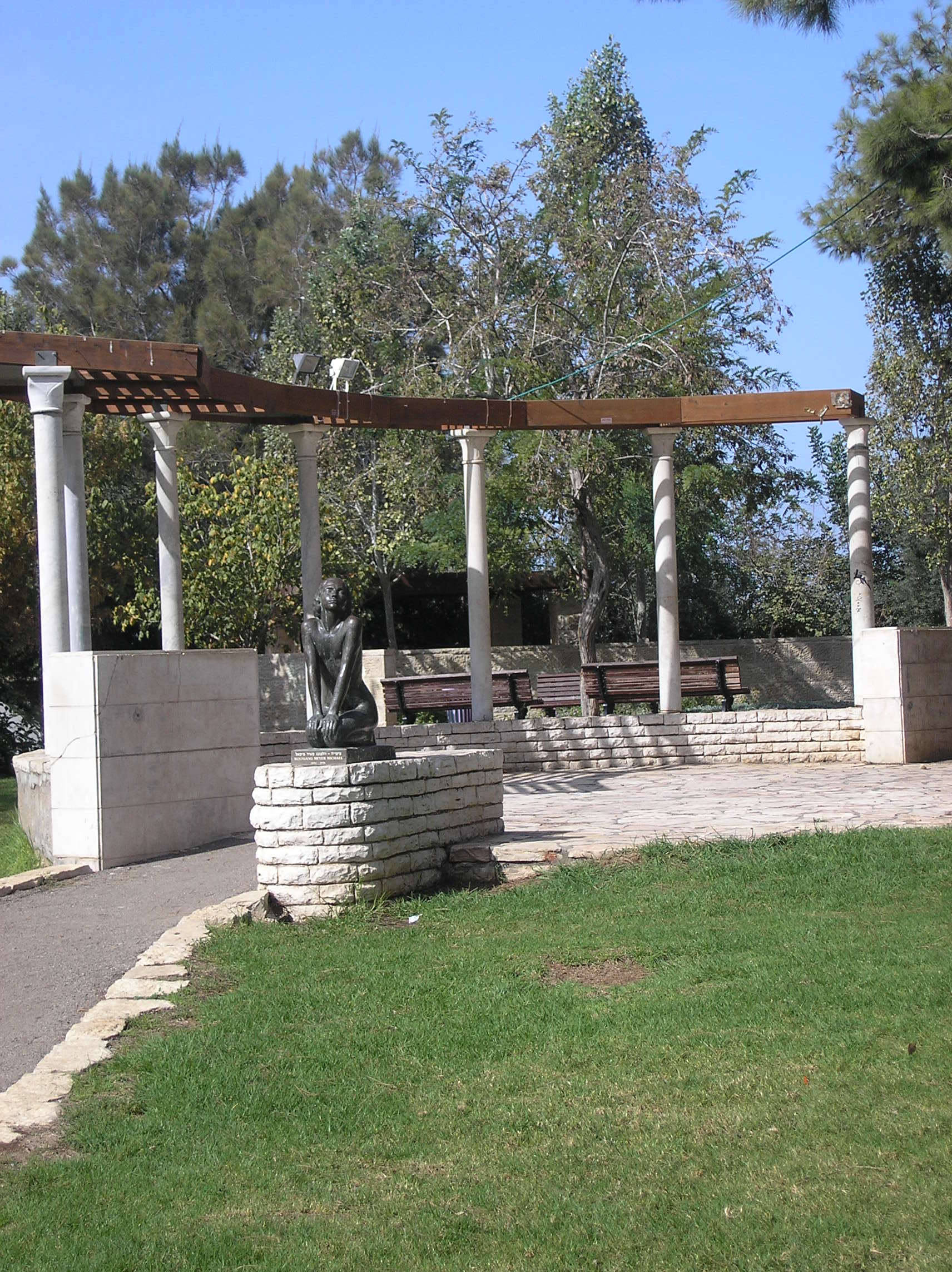
Gan HaEm, the neighborhood's principal park

The neighborhood's hotels are concentrated along HaNassi Avenue, overlooking Haifa Bay. The Dan Carmel hotel, designed by architect Shmuel Rosov, had its cornerstone laid in 1961 and opened in 1963, becoming Haifa's first modern luxury hotel and, for a time, the only five-star hotel in northern Israel. The hotel, which originally had 220 rooms across fourteen floors, has hosted numerous public figures and celebrities over the years, including Prime Minister David Ben-Gurion, who rested there for his 80th birthday celebrations, and Egyptian President Anwar Sadat, who held a press conference at the hotel together with Prime Minister Menachem Begin and President Yitzhak Navon.

In 1986, the Dan Panorama Haifa opened as a second hotel in the neighborhood under the same chain, aimed at business travelers.

=== Gardens ===
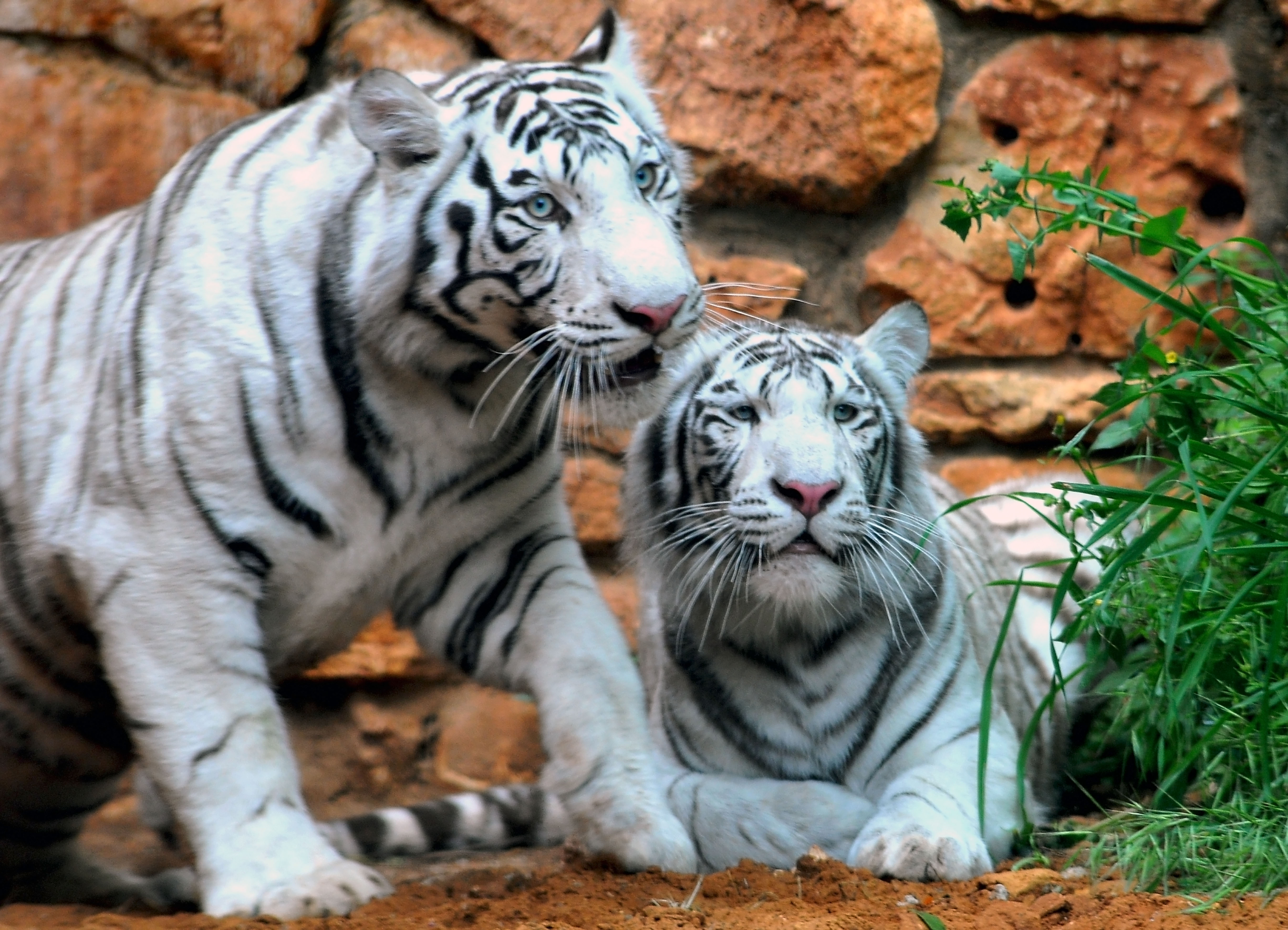
White tigers in the Haifa zoo

Gan HaEm ("Mother's Garden"), the neighborhood's principal park, was established in 1913 by gardener Gottfried Meyer on the grounds of the estate of Reverend Martin Schneider of the Carmel Mission, and was originally known as "Gan HaTznobar" ("Pine Garden"), after the pine lined street beside it. After the Second World War, ownership of the garden passed to the Haifa Municipality, and mayor Abba Hushi renamed it Gan HaEm in tribute to the role of mothers within the family. The garden spans roughly 400 dunams and includes open lawns, shaded areas, a playground, and an amphitheater that hosts free public concerts during the summer. It adjoins Haifa Zoo and Nahal Lotem, and its upper Carmelit station takes its name from the park.

=== Museums ===
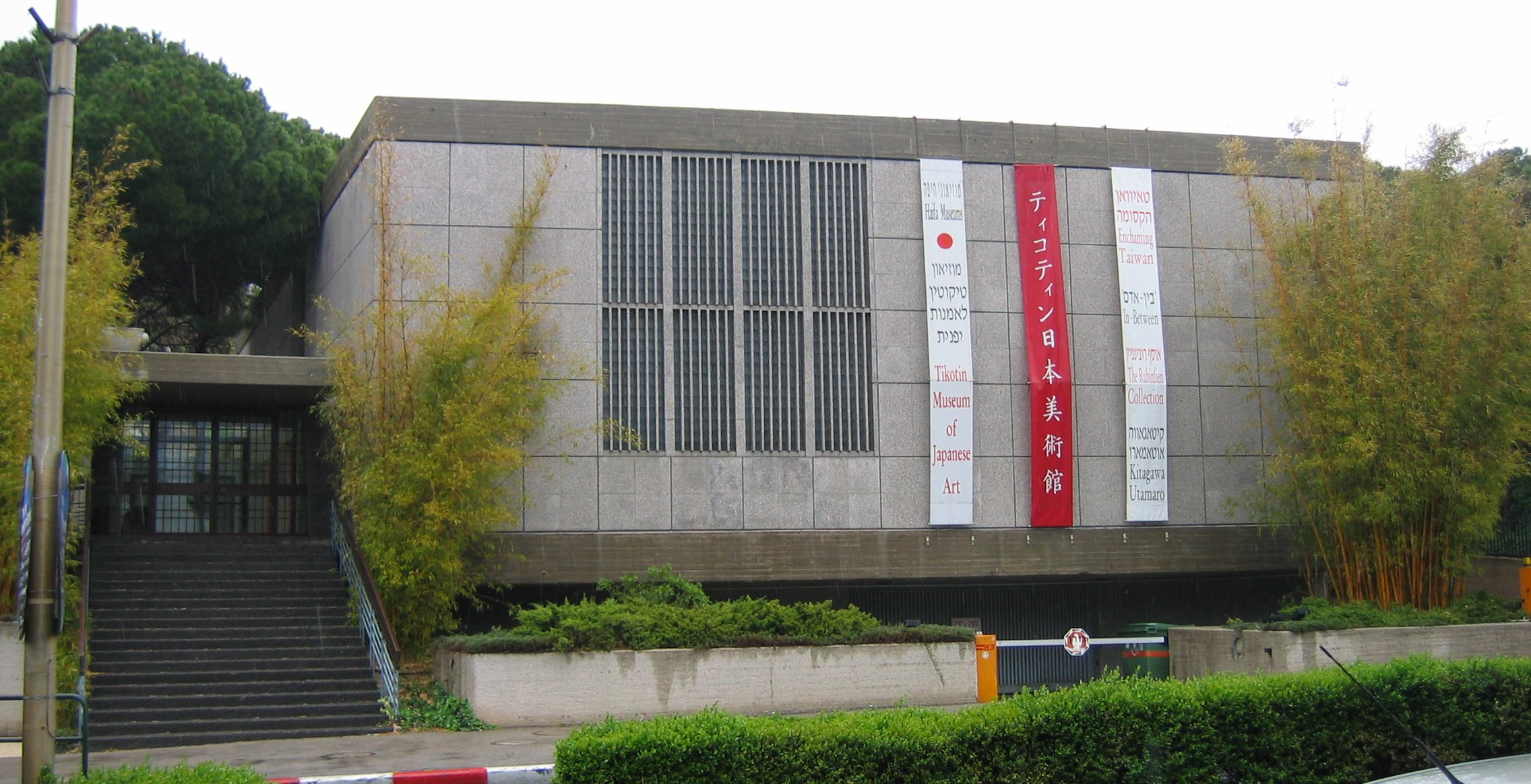
The Tikotin Museum of Japanese Art in Merkaz HaCarmel

The city of Haifa, led by mayor Abba Hushi, acquired the former home of Frederick Kisch (who lived there 1934–1939) on HaNassi Avenue in 1958, and the following year established the Tikotin Museum of Japanese Art there together with Dutch based collector Felix Tikotin, who donated his collection of Japanese art. No other museum of its kind exists elsewhere in the Middle East. It opened to the public in 1960; in 1988 it was burgled and about 200 items were stolen, most of which were later recovered after surfacing at a Sotheby's auction in London.

The Mane-Katz Museum houses the work of Emmanuel Mane-Katz. In 1957, mayor Abba Hushi persuaded Mané-Katz to settle in Haifa, agreeing that the city would provide him with a house and, after his death, establish a museum in his name in exchange for his bequeathing his estate and collections to the city, which he formalized in 1958. Following his death in 1962, the museum opened in 1977 in the home where he had lived and worked, and it was incorporated into the Haifa Museums group in 2010.

In 1961, the Moshe Shteklis Museum of Prehistory was founded on the initiative of mayor Abba Hushi and Prof. Moshe Stekelis of the Hebrew University of Jerusalem, the first museum in the country devoted entirely to prehistory. Its founding collection was based on the archaeological excavation at Nahal Oren, partly funded by the Haifa Municipality, under an agreement transferring two-thirds of the finds to the museum; additional collections were donated by local researchers Yaakov Olami and Eliezer Warszawski. The museum opened to the public on 15 February 1962, initially simply as "the Museum of Prehistory"; it was renamed for Stekelis after his death in 1967. The museum displays prehistoric finds from archaeological excavations in Carmel, mostly from Nahal Oren and Kebara Cave, and finds from underwater excavations of the Neolithic village of Atlit Yam, off the coast of Atlit.

=== Louis Promenade ===
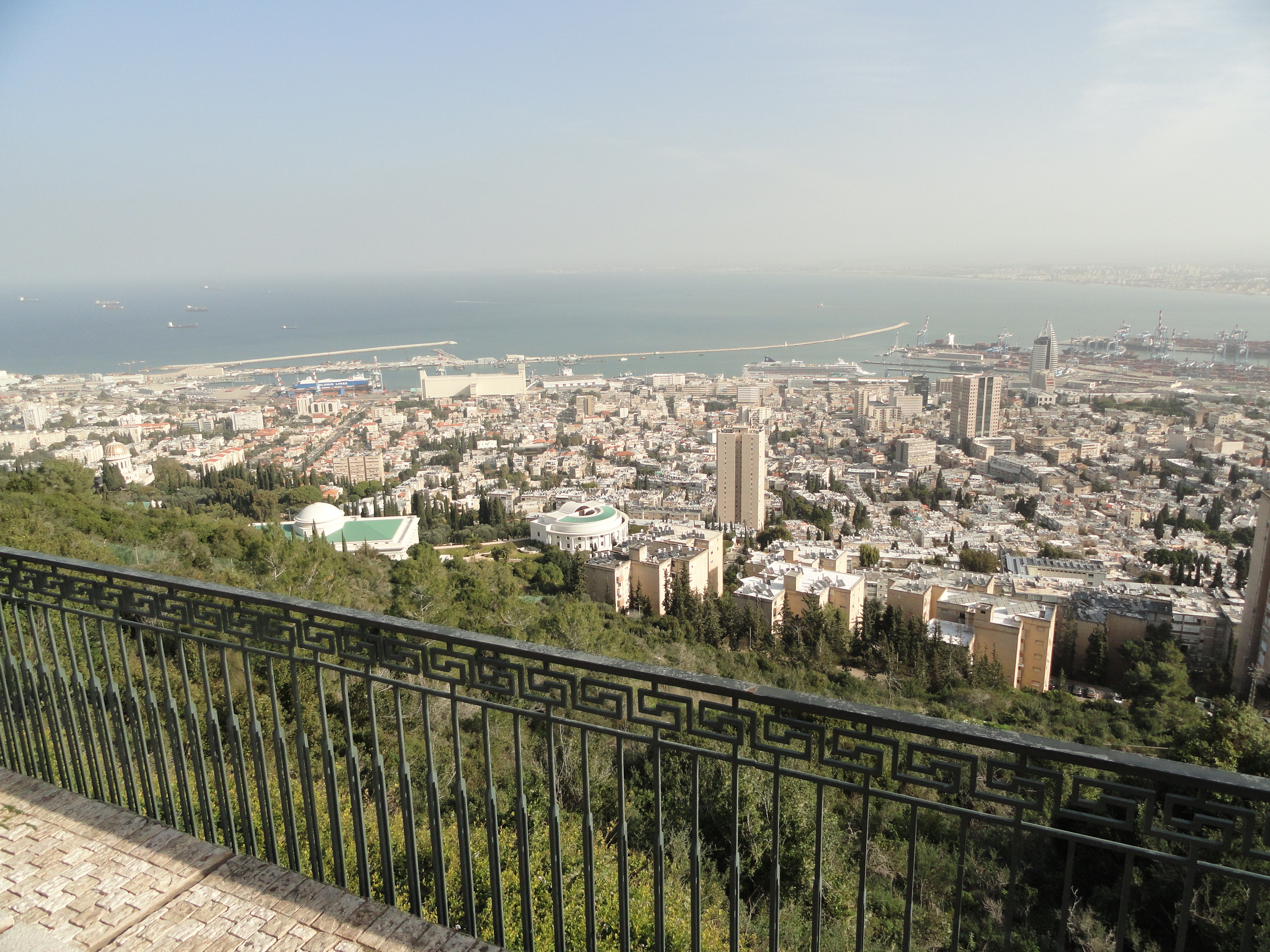
View of the city of Haifa from Louis Promenade in Merkaz HaCarmel

The Louis Promenade, built in 1992 along Yefe Nof Street, runs between the Dan Carmel and Nof hotels and overlooks Haifa Bay. It was donated by Paul and May Goldschmidt, Haifa residents originally from South Africa, in memory of their son Louis (Ariel), who was killed in a car accident. Paul Goldschmidt was the main contractor of the Hanging Gardens of Haifa, and the roughly 400-metre promenade was built as an approach to the gardens' upper entrance. Along its route stand a German obelisk erected in 1910 to commemorate Kaiser Wilhelm II's 1898 visit to Haifa, and a Belgian naval cannon placed nearby as a symbolic counterweight to the German-Turkish side that lost the First World War.

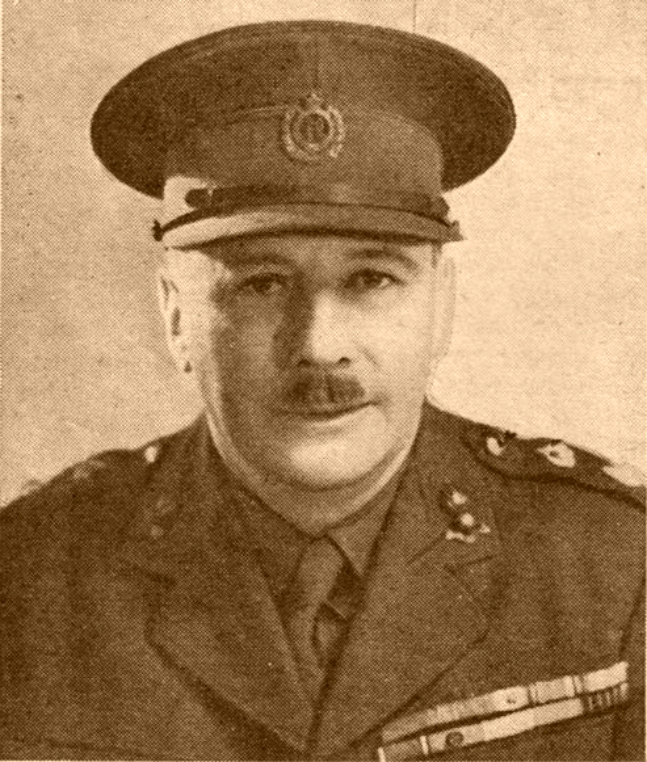
Frederick Kisch

=== Notable residents ===
- Frederick Kisch, a British army officer and Zionist leader, lived in a house on HaNassi Avenue from 1934 until 1939.
- The painter and sculptor Emmanuel Mane-Katz settled in Haifa in 1957.

== Commerce ==
Two shopping centers serve the neighborhood: the Panorama Center and the Auditorium Square Mall, the latter housing the Haifa Cinematheque and several theatres alongside its retail space. Since the late 20th century, HaNassi Avenue and the adjoining Moriah Boulevard have developed into a concentration of European-style cafés and restaurants, part of a municipal effort to reposition the area as a leisure and entertainment district.

== Education ==
As of 2011, the neighborhood was served by several kindergartens, two elementary schools, three middle schools, and two high schools, along with health clinics and a retirement home.

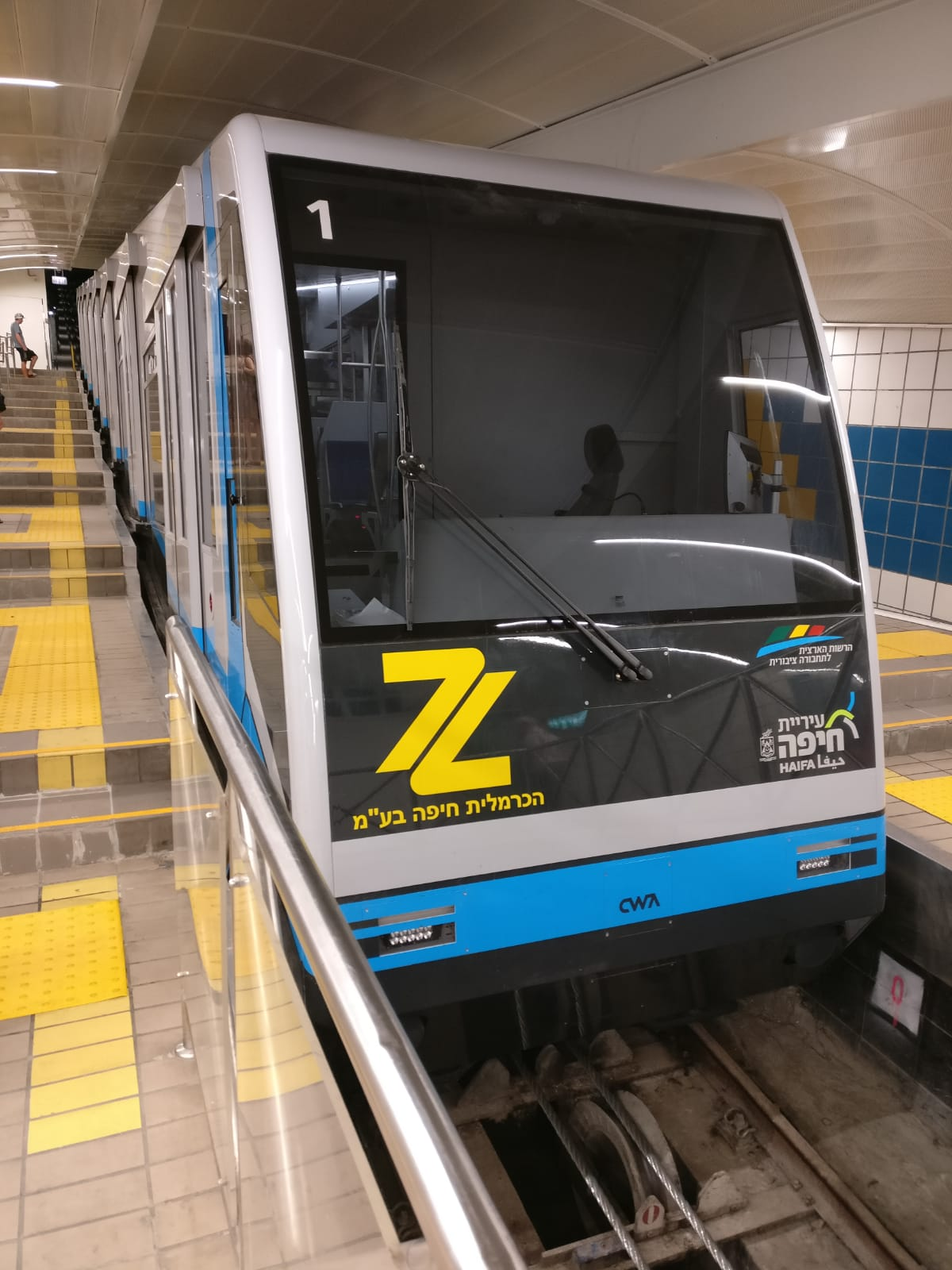
The Carmelit

== Transportation ==
Merkaz HaCarmel is served by two stations of the Carmelit, Haifa's underground funicular railway: Gan HaEm, its upper terminus, and Carmel Center. Opened in 1959 after three years of construction, the Carmelit runs along a single tunnel with six stations in total, connecting the neighborhood to Hadar HaCarmel and downtown Haifa.

The neighborhood is also served by the Metronit bus rapid transit network, with stops including Merkaz HaCarmel/HaNassi on HaNassi Avenue and several stops along Moriah Boulevard.
