= Frederick Kisch =

British Army officer

Frederick Hermann Kisch
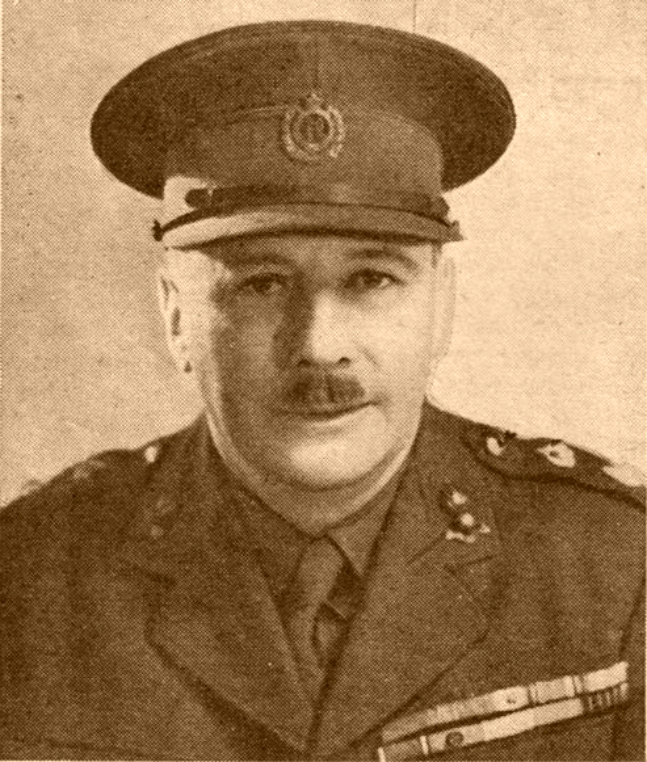
- Brigadier Frederick Kisch
- Born: 23 August 1888; Darjeeling, Bengal, British India
- Died: 7 April 1943 (aged 54); Wadi Akarit, French Tunisia
- Burial place: Enfidha, Tunisia
- Military career
- Allegiance: United Kingdom
- Branch: British Army
- Service years: 1909–1919; 1939–1943
- Rank: Brigadier
- Service number: 4035
- Unit: Royal Engineers
- Conflicts: First World War: Middle Eastern theatre; Mesopotamian campaign; Western Front; Arab revolt in Palestine; Second World War: North African Campaign; Western Desert Campaign; Operation Torch; Tunisia Campaign; Battle of Wadi Akarit †
- Awards: Companion of the Order of the Bath; Commander of the Order of the British Empire; Distinguished Service Order; Legion of Honour, Officer (France); Croix de guerre with Palm (France); Order of Wen-Hu (China)

Frederick Hermann Kisch, CB, CBE, DSO (23 August 1888 – 7 April 1943) was a decorated British Army officer and Zionist leader. A Brigadier, he was the highest ranking Jew to serve in the British Army.

== Early life and education ==
Frederick Kisch was born to a British-Jewish family in the town of Darjeeling, British Empire in India, on 23 August 1888, where his father Michael was head of the Indian Postal Service. After some time, Kisch family moved back to England, where Frederick attended Clifton College and subsequently the Royal Military Academy Woolwich.

== First World War ==
Kisch joined the Royal Engineers in 1909 and served with them in the First World War in France and the Middle East theatres.

During his war service, he was wounded three times, and decorated with the Distinguished Service Order for gallantry in action. He was also decorated by the government of France with the Croix de guerre with Palm. Due to his wounds, he was declared temporarily unfit for frontline service and was subsequently transferred to the Military Intelligence Corps, where he served for the rest of the war. He also served as general staff officer to General Sir George Macdonogh. During the war, he reached the rank of lieutenant-colonel.

== Interwar period ==
Kisch was appointed a member of the British delegation to the 1919 Paris Peace Conference.

He joined the Zionist Organization in 1922, where he headed the political department until being succeeded by Chaim Arlosoroff. He also served as Zionist Commission head for the Jerusalem region between 1923 and 1931. His British military background allowed him to cultivate excellent relations with the British administration of Mandatory Palestine as well as Arab leaders including Sharif Hussein of Mecca and his son, Emir Abdullah of Trans-Jordan. Kisch was awarded the Order of Wen-Hu (4th Class) by the Republic of China in 1921.

== Second World War ==
Kisch was recalled to active service in 1939 at the outbreak of the Second World War. He was promoted to the rank of brigadier and assigned to the British Eighth Army, where he became commanding officer of the Royal Engineers in the North African Campaign.

Kisch was killed in Tunisia on 7 April 1943 when he stepped on a landmine during the Battle of Wadi Akarit. He had been organising reconstruction of a bridge, essential to the Allied advance. He is buried at Enfidaville War Cemetery in Tunisia.

== Legacy ==
Ya'ar Kisch-the "Kisch Memorial Forest", moshav Kfar Kisch and various streets, including Sderot Kisch on the Carmel in Haifa, are among places named after him.

In 2015, his grandson Yoav was elected to the Knesset for the Likud party, and in December 2022 he was appointed Minister of Education and Minister of Regional Cooperation.

== Bibliography ==
- Frederick Hermann Kisch, Palestine Diary; with a Foreword by the Rt Hon. D. Lloyd George. Gollancz, 1938.
- Norman Bentwich & Michael Kisch, Brigadier Frederick Kisch. Vallentine Mitchell, London, 1966.
