= Carmelit =

Underground funicular railway in Haifa, Israel

Carmelit כרמלית كرمليت

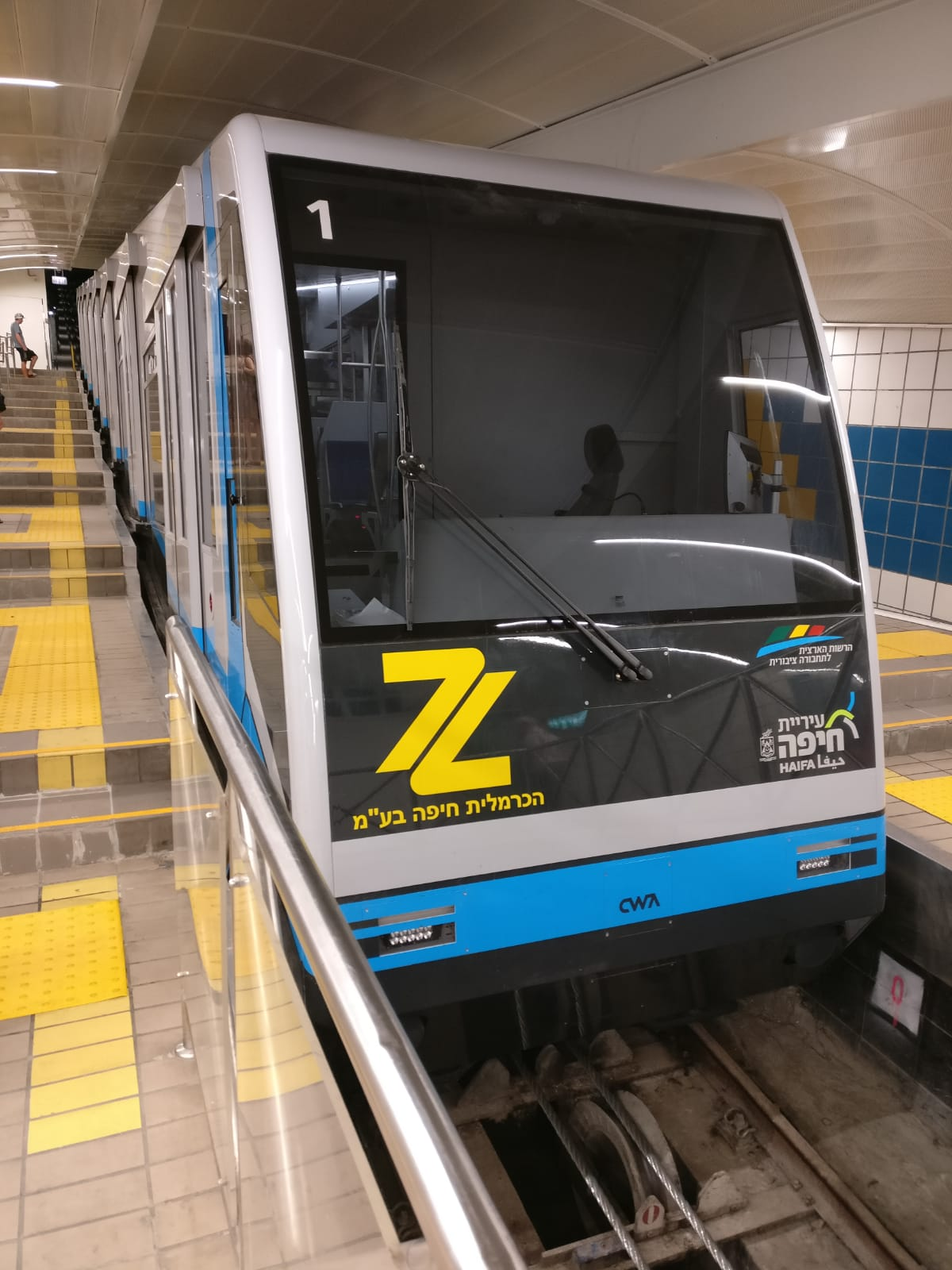
- The new Carmelit - Train No 1.

Overview
- Status: In service
- Owner: Haifa Municipality
- Locale: Haifa
- Termini: Carmel Center; Downtown
- Stations: 6
- Website: www.carmelithaifa.co.il

Service
- Type: Funicular Subway
- Services: 1
- Operator: The Carmelit Haifa Company Ltd.
- Rolling stock: 4 Von Roll (now Doppelmayr) funicular cars 2 per train
- Ridership: 732,664 (2012)

History
- Opened: October 6, 1959; 67 years ago

Technical
- Line length: 1.8 km (1.1 mi)
- Number of tracks: 1
- Character: 1
- Track gauge: 1,980 mm (6 ft 6 in)
- Operating speed: 28 km/h (17 mph)
- Highest elevation: 268 m (879 ft) above sea level

The Carmelit (Hebrew: כַּרְמְלִית Arabic: كرمليت) is an underground funicular railway in Haifa, Israel. Construction started in 1956 and ended in 1959. It is the oldest funicular railway and underground transit system in the Middle East and was the only underground transit system in Israel until the 2023 opening of Tel Aviv Light Rail. The Carmelit has closed down for repair on three occasions.

== System ==
The Carmelit, named after Mount Carmel through which it runs, is an underground funicular railway in Haifa. The difference in elevation between the first and last stations is 274 meters (899 feet). Carmelit cars have a slanted design, with steps within each car and on the station platform. Since the grade varies along the route, the floor of each car is never quite level, and slopes slightly "uphill" or "downhill" depending on the location, the only exception being Masada station.

The Carmelit is one of the smallest subway systems in the world, having only four cars, six stations and a single tunnel 1.8 km (1.1 mi) long. The four cars operate as two two-car trains, which run on single-track with a short passing loop to allow the trains to pass each other.

The technology used in the system forces it to have an even number of stations at approximately equal distances. This means that some stations are not close to major centers, but were situated for technical reasons.

== History ==
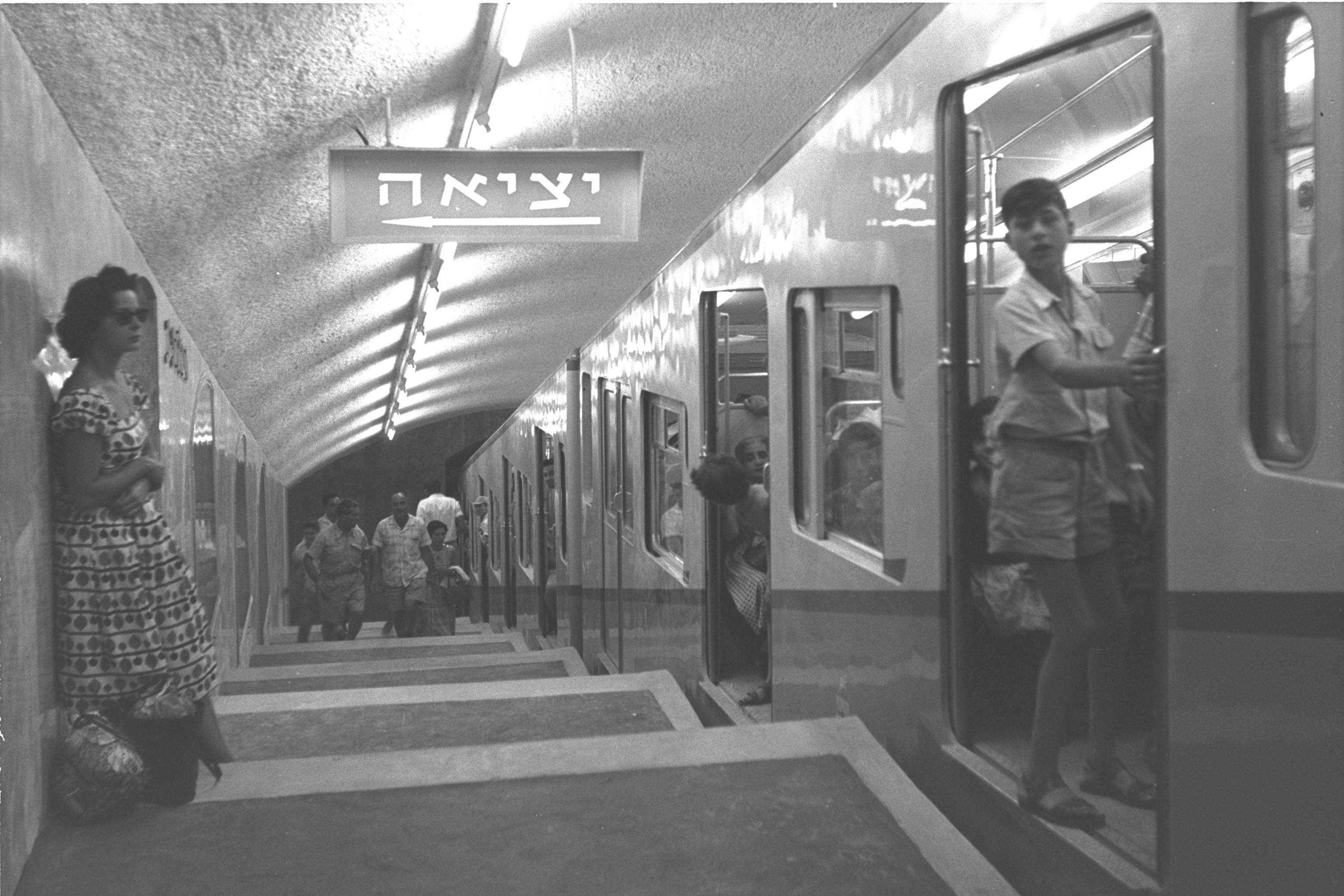
Carmelit opening day in 1959

A rail-based solution to connect Mount Carmel with downtown Haifa was envisioned by the British mandatory authorities. However, practical talks only began in 1955 under the auspices of then-mayor Abba Hushi. The French company Compagnie Dunkerquoise d'Entreprises created a detailed plan and proposed a generous loan for a large part of the project, and an agreement was signed in 1956. The plan was for a funicular system, and the inauguration took place in 1959, attended by Israeli prime minister David Ben Gurion and the French transport minister Robert Buron among others.

The Israeli company Solel Boneh carried out the works, which proceeded at a pace of three meters a day, other than a geologically difficult section where a speed of 1.5 meters a day was achieved.

=== Shutdowns ===
The Carmelit was shut down for intensive renovation on December 19, 1986, after 27 consecutive years. The old rolling stock was taken to a scrapyard near Kfar Masaryk in 1991, after being offered to the Israel Railway Museum which refused it due to high transport costs. After several delays and failed attempts, renovation work started on October 29, 1990. The Carmelit finally reopened to the public in early September 1992.

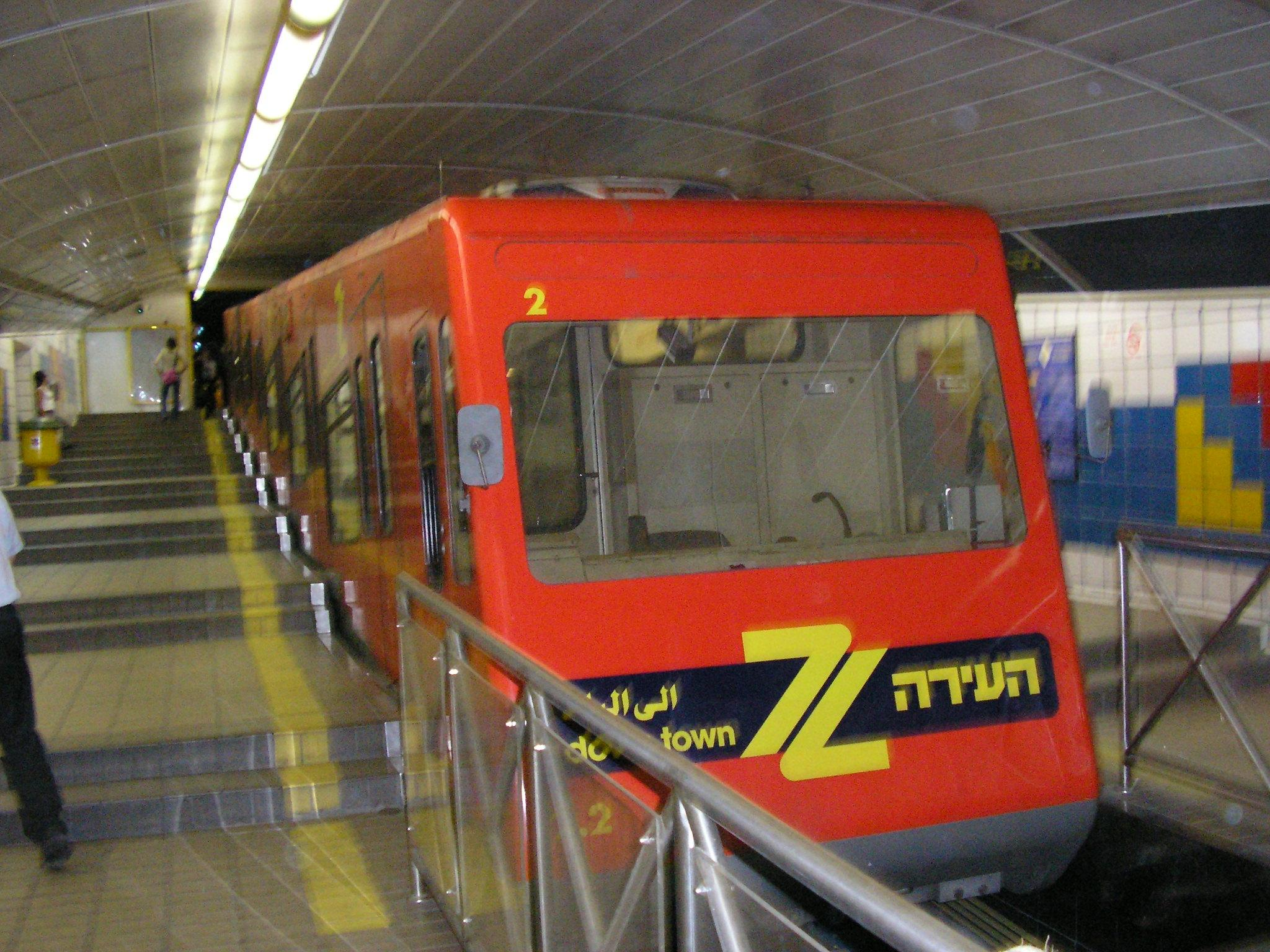
The Carmelit train before the fire in 2017

In March 2015, the Carmelit was closed again due to a faulty cable, and subsequently reopened in July 2015. At the same time new ticket machines were installed to accommodate the Rav-Kav ticketing system.

On Saturday, February 4, 2017, a fire erupted in the Paris Square station after working hours. One of the two trainsets was heavily damaged, as well as parts of the tunnel. As a result, the line was once more shut down and underwent an upgrade that included replacing both trainsets with new ones (supplied by Doppelmayr's Swiss subsidiary which had built the original trainsets), a new control center, and a major refurbishing of the systems and infrastructure. It reopened in October 2018.

== Today ==
The small number of stations means that the Carmelit serves only a small part of Haifa – which was the important population and business center when it was designed. Nowadays, the vast majority of the city's population does not live near any of the stations, making it used by only few. There have been talks of extending the tunnels to reach more people, but this has not been done, primarily for economic reasons. The most widely used public transportation system in the Haifa area consists of Egged buses, which serve most of the city.

Haifa's comptroller wrote in his 2004 report (published in 2005) about the declining use of the Carmelit. According to the report, the system is used by only 2,000 passengers a day, and has been losing money ever since its reopening in 1992. The accrued losses between 1992 and 2003 are over ₪191 million.

Since October 31, 2010, taking a bicycle on the Carmelit has been allowed at no additional cost.

An extensive BRT system called Metronit began operating in Haifa in late 2013. It was hoped the stops at some of the Carmelit stations would increase ridership on the line.

When the Carmelit reopened at the end of 2018, it experienced a surge in ridership, with 4,000 people taking it per day, the highest figure in 20 years.

As of 2025, the Carmelit is the only fully underground railway in Israel. However, much of the Tel Aviv Light Rail is underground as well.

== Stations ==
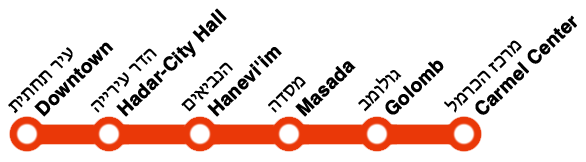
Carmelit route map

=== Properties ===
The Carmelit stations are small; entrance halls are at only the two terminal stations.

=== Stations in descending order ===
Station	Hebrew name	Arabic name	Location and description	Entrance location	Entrance	Platforms
Carmel Center	מרכז הכרמל	مركز الكرمل	Located in the Carmel Center, adjacent to the Haifa zoo, a panoramic promenade, the Haifa Auditorium, and many shops and hotels. Until 2018, the station was known as Gan HaEm (גן האם).	Carmel Center		
Golomb	גולומב	غولومب	The station was named Bnei Zion (בני ציון) between 2003 and October 2018. Located on Golomb Street, near Bnai Zion Medical Center and the Bahá'í World Centre.	Golomb		
Masada	מסדה	مسادا (مسعدة)	Upper Hadar HaCarmel: located in the vicinity of Masada and Hillel streets, with their galleries, shops, cafés and restaurants, as well as the Madatech Science Museum.	Masada		
HaNevi'im	הנביאים	هنفيئيم (الأنبياء)	Hadar HaCarmel: near HaNevi'im, Herzl and HeHalutz streets, which have a mix of shops and offices. The Haifa Museum of Art is located near this station. Connection to Metronit Line 3	Hanevi'im		
Hadar-City Hall	הדר עירייה	الهدار-البلدية	Next to HaNevi'im Tower, HaAtzmaut Park, and Haifa City Hall. Until 2018, this station was known as Solel Boneh (סולל בונה).	Hadar-City Hall		
Downtown	עיר תחתית	البلدة التحتى	Downtown: near Haifa's government building and courthouse, HaAtzmaut Street, and within walking distance to Haifa Center Railway Station and the Port of Haifa. The station was previously named Paris Square (כיכר פריז). Connection to Metronit Lines 1 and 2	Downtown		

== Operating hours ==
Sunday through Thursday	06:00–24:00
Friday and the eve of a holiday	06:00–15:00
Saturday	19:00–24:00 summer 20:00–24:00 winter

== Gallery ==
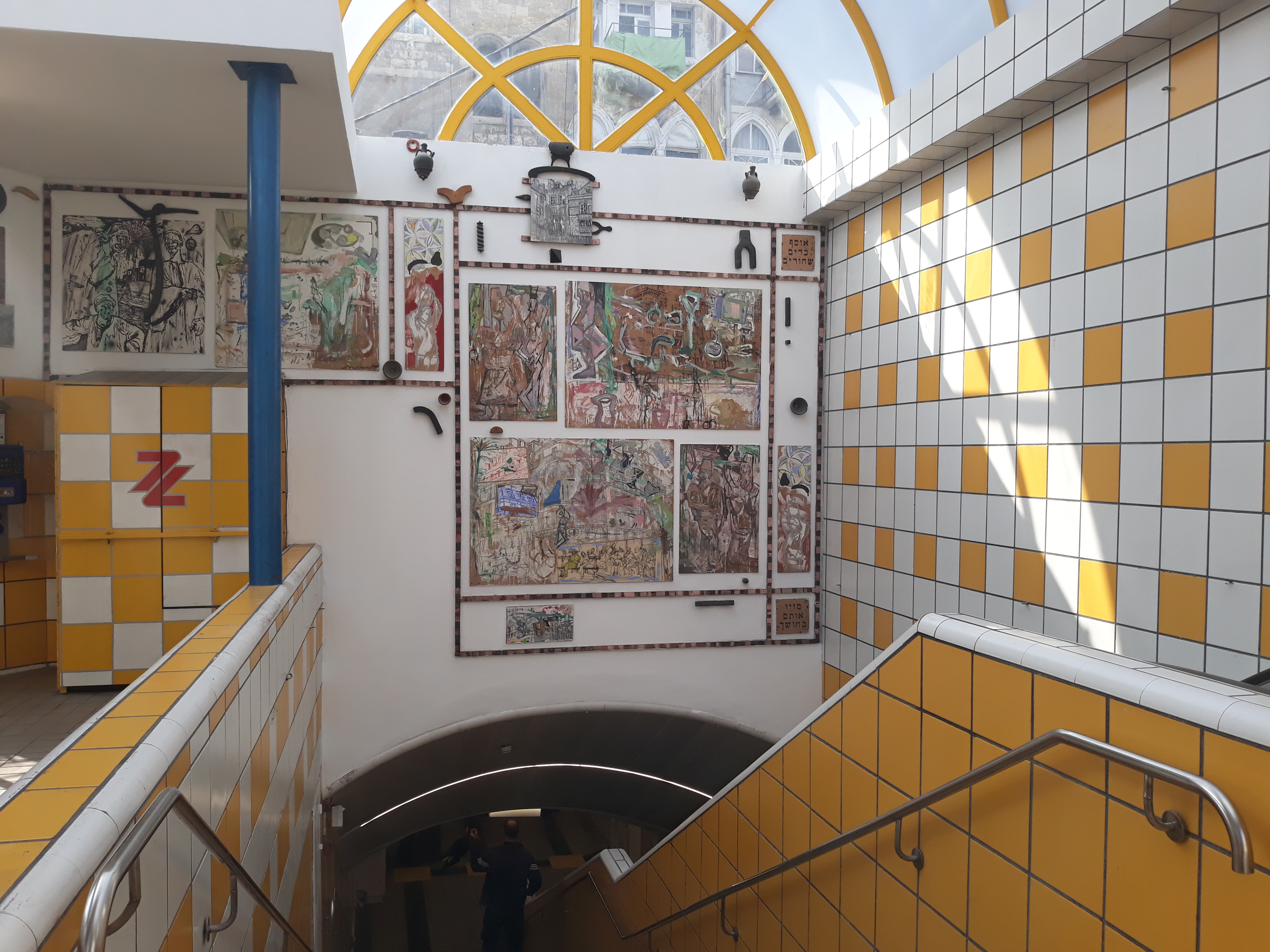
A mural in the Downtown entrance

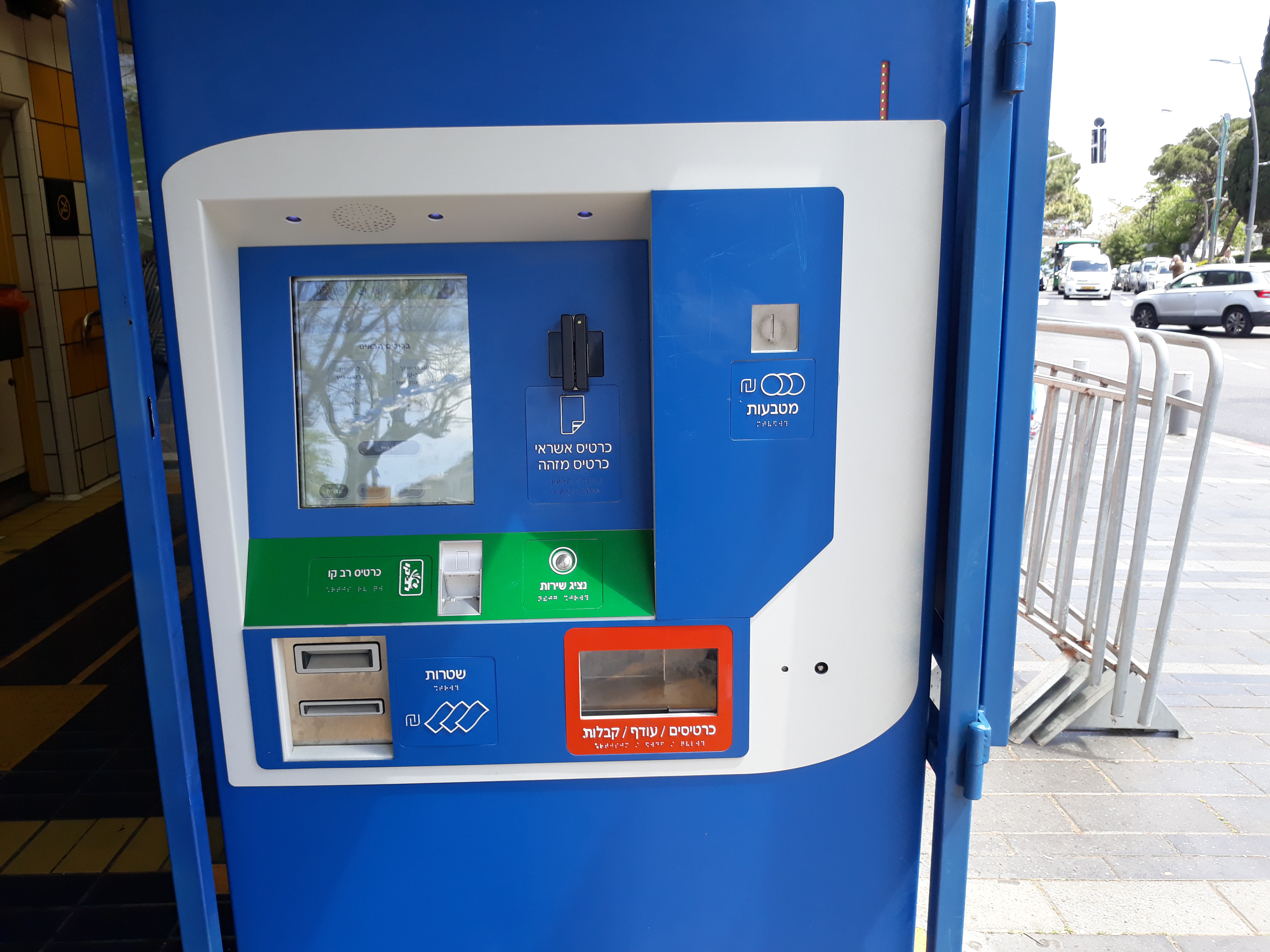
A ticket machine

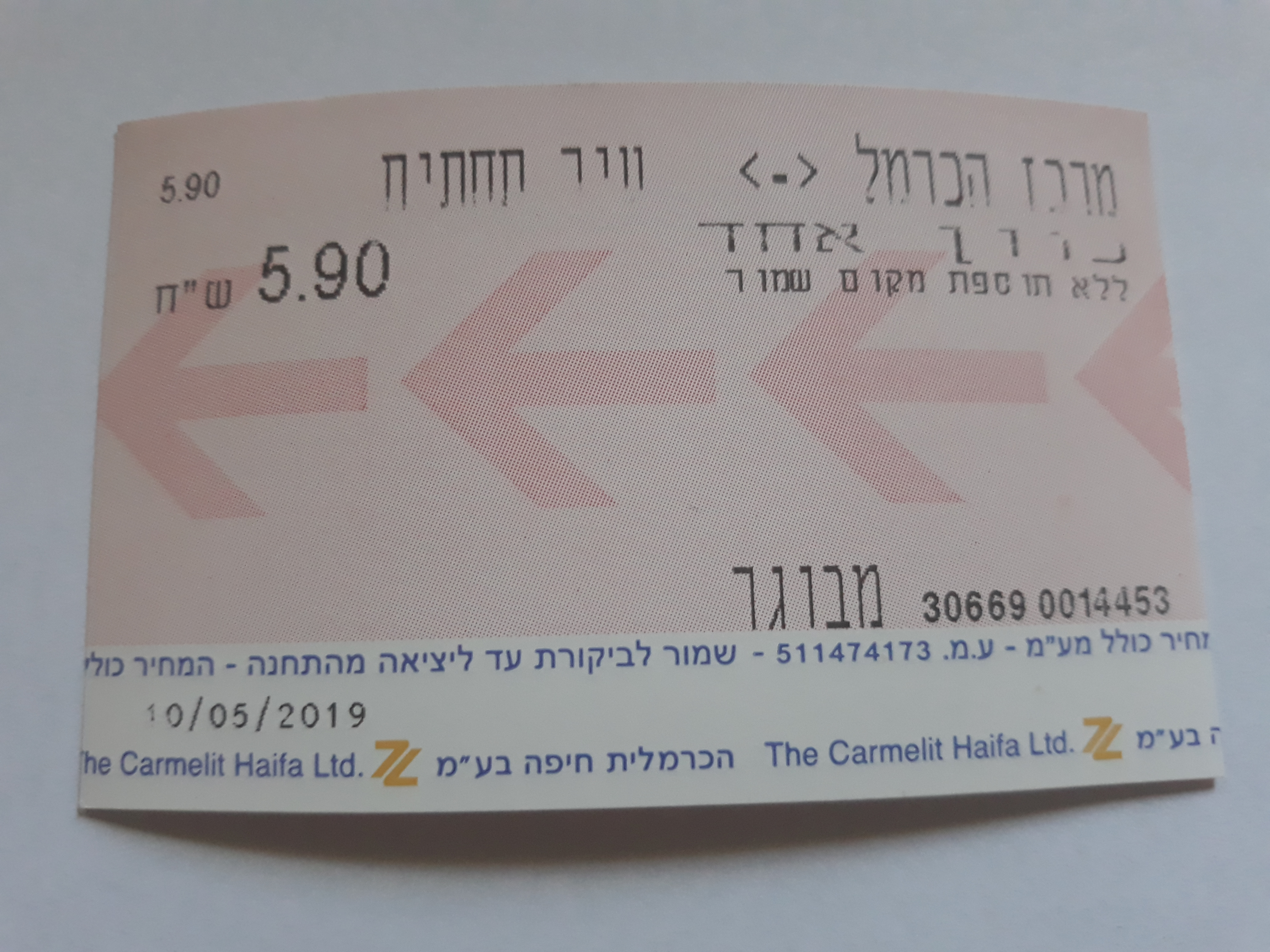
A ticket

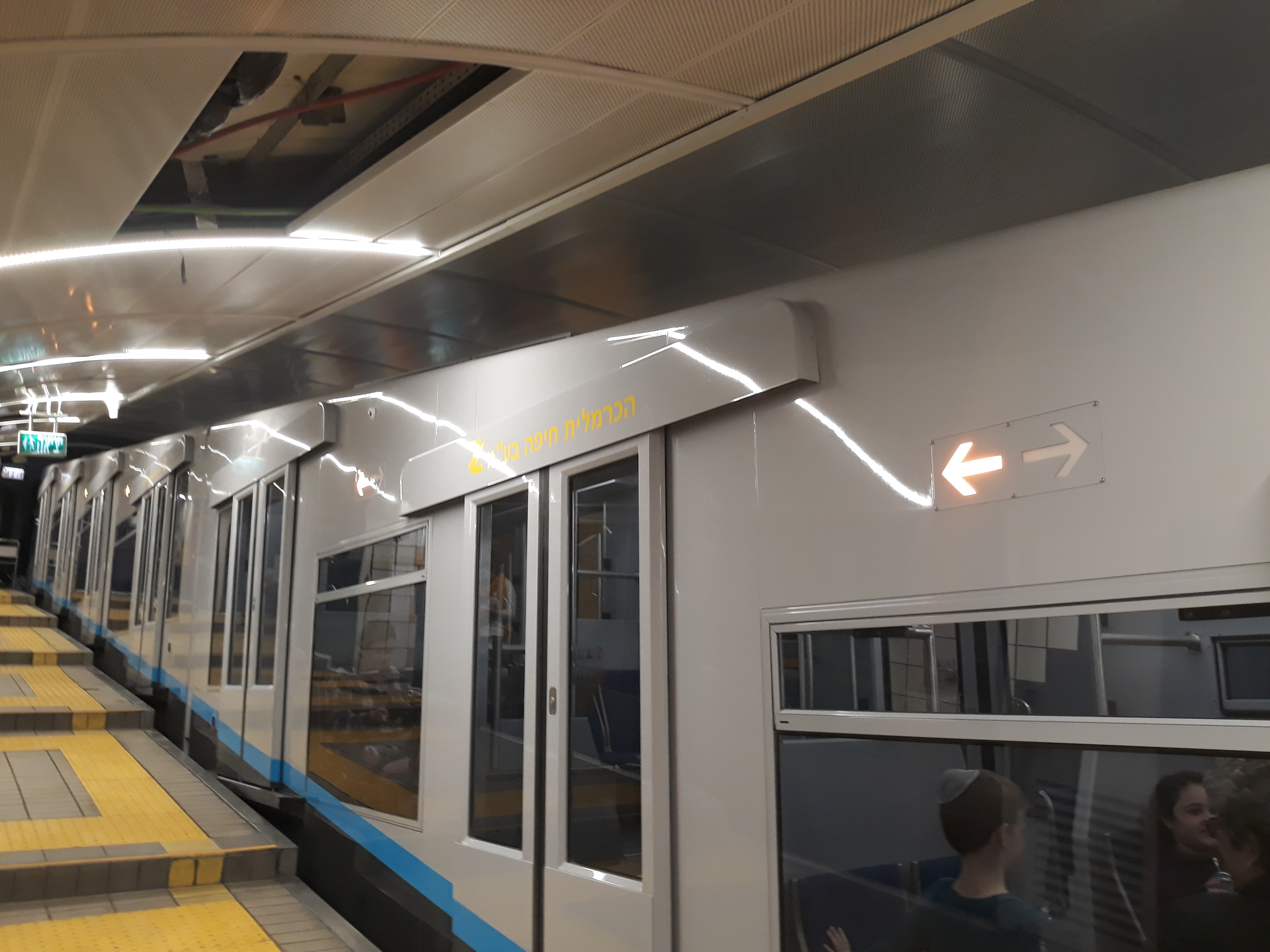
A car on the Carmelit subway

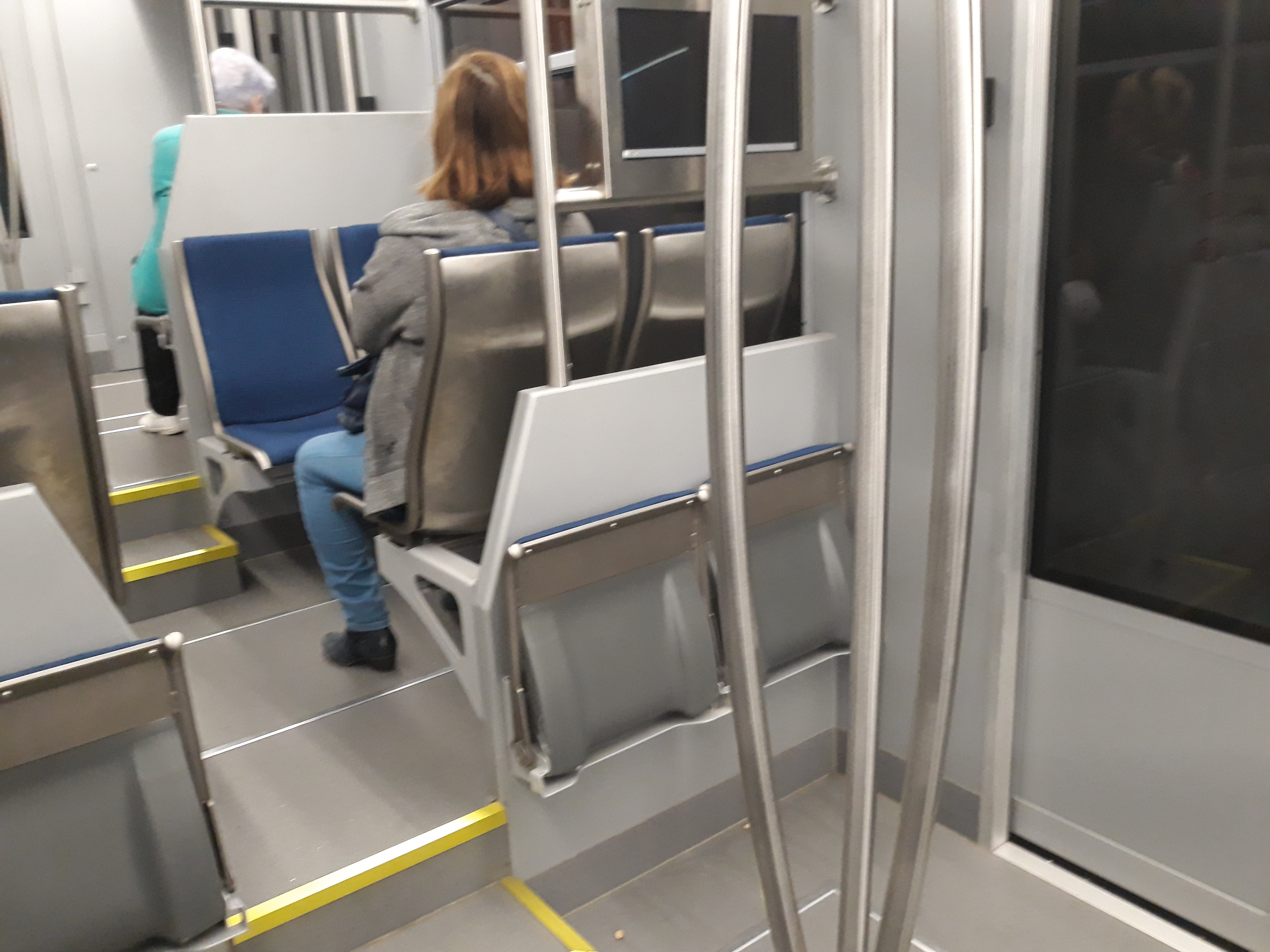
Train's interior

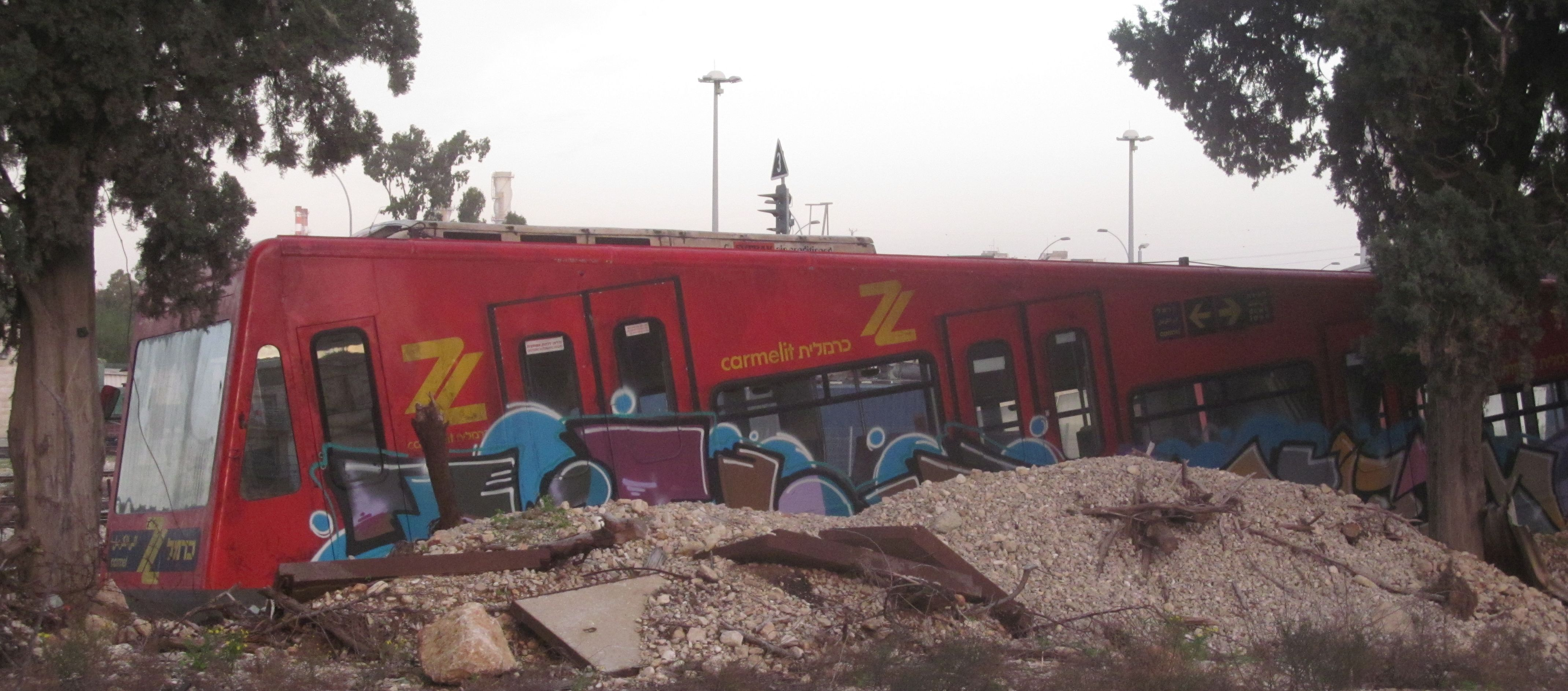
Old Carmelit car stored at Haifa East railway station

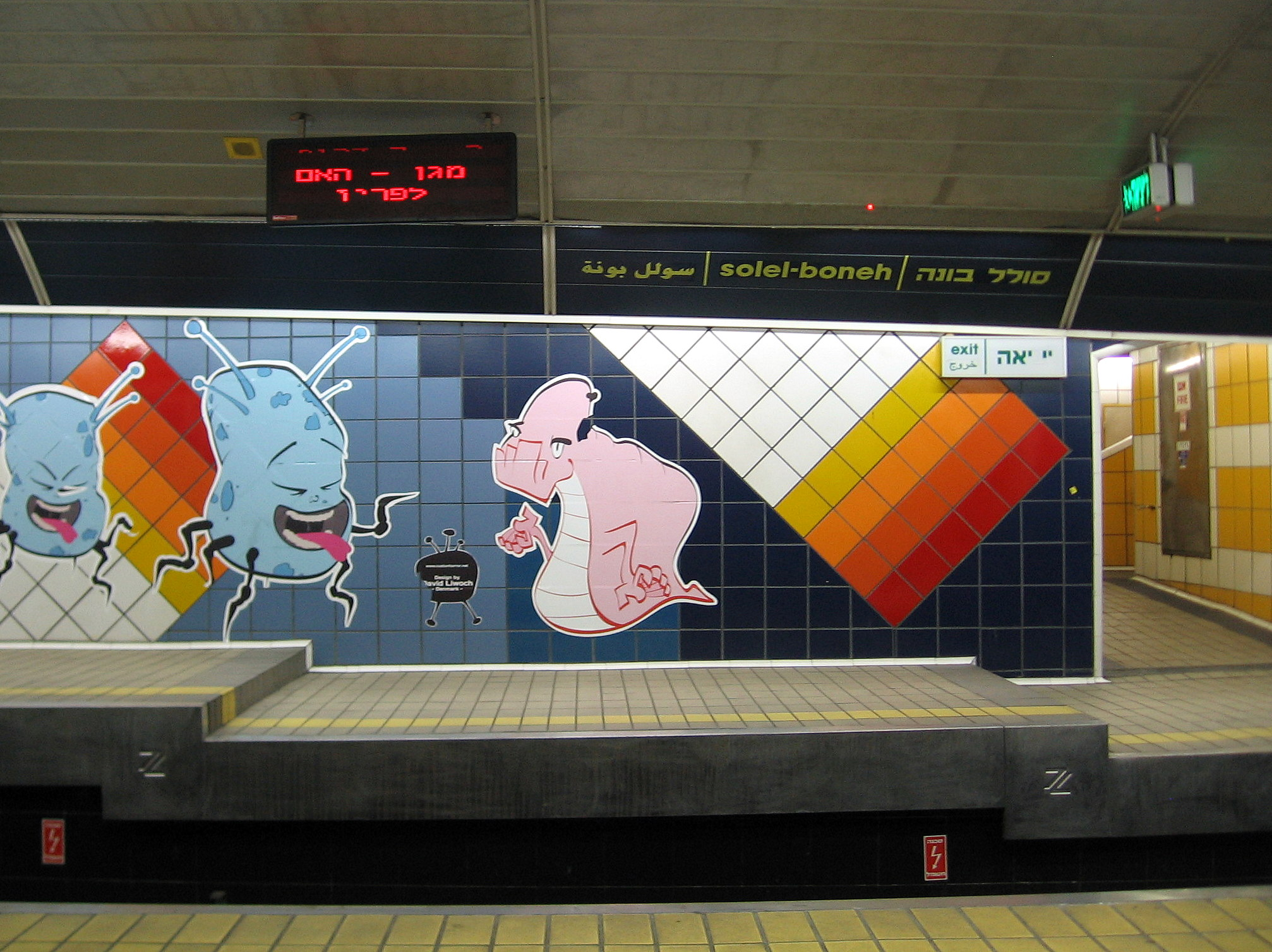
Hadar-City Hall station before 2018

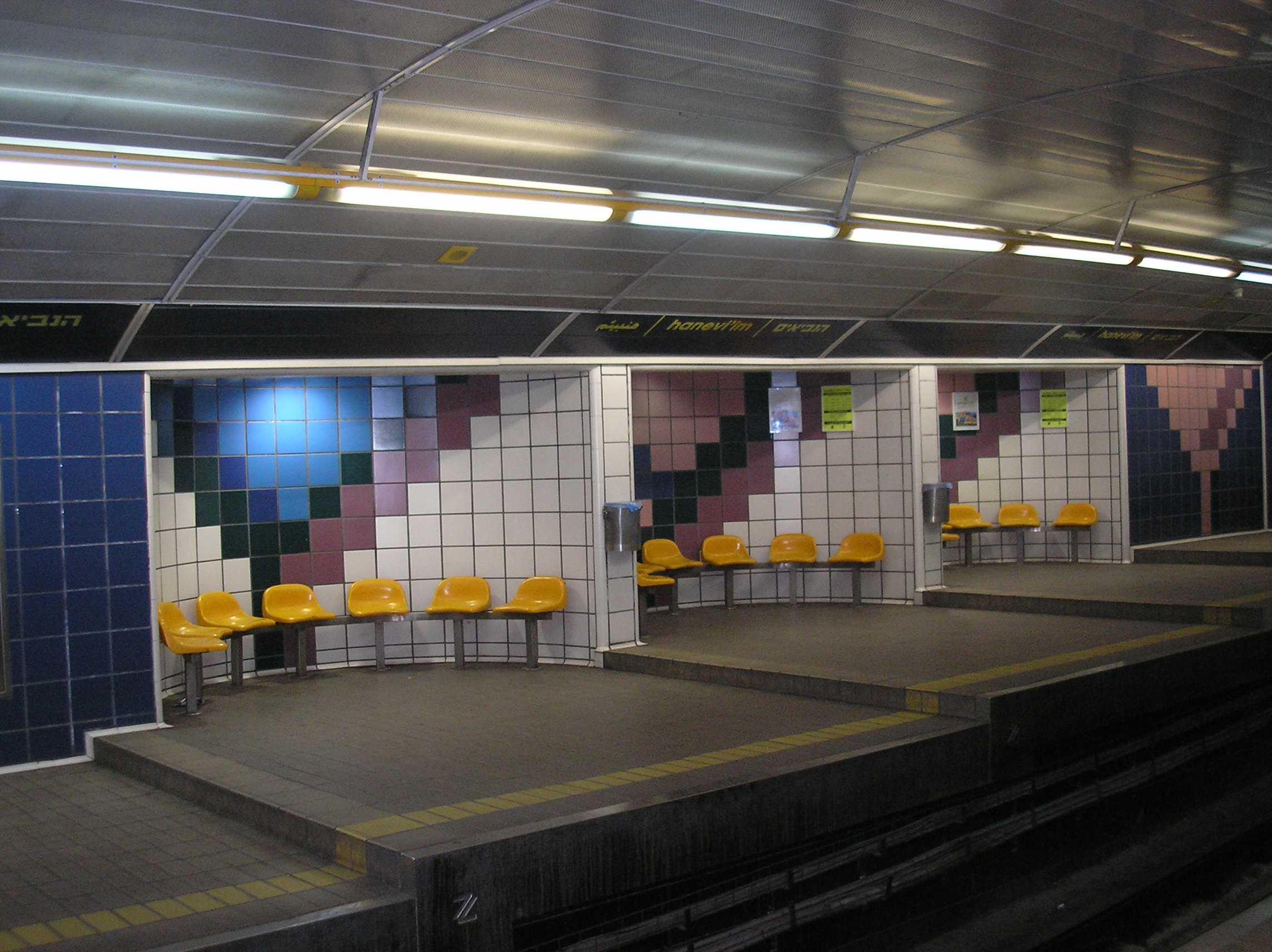
Hanevi'im Station in 2007

Passengers at Gan Ha'em station in 1962

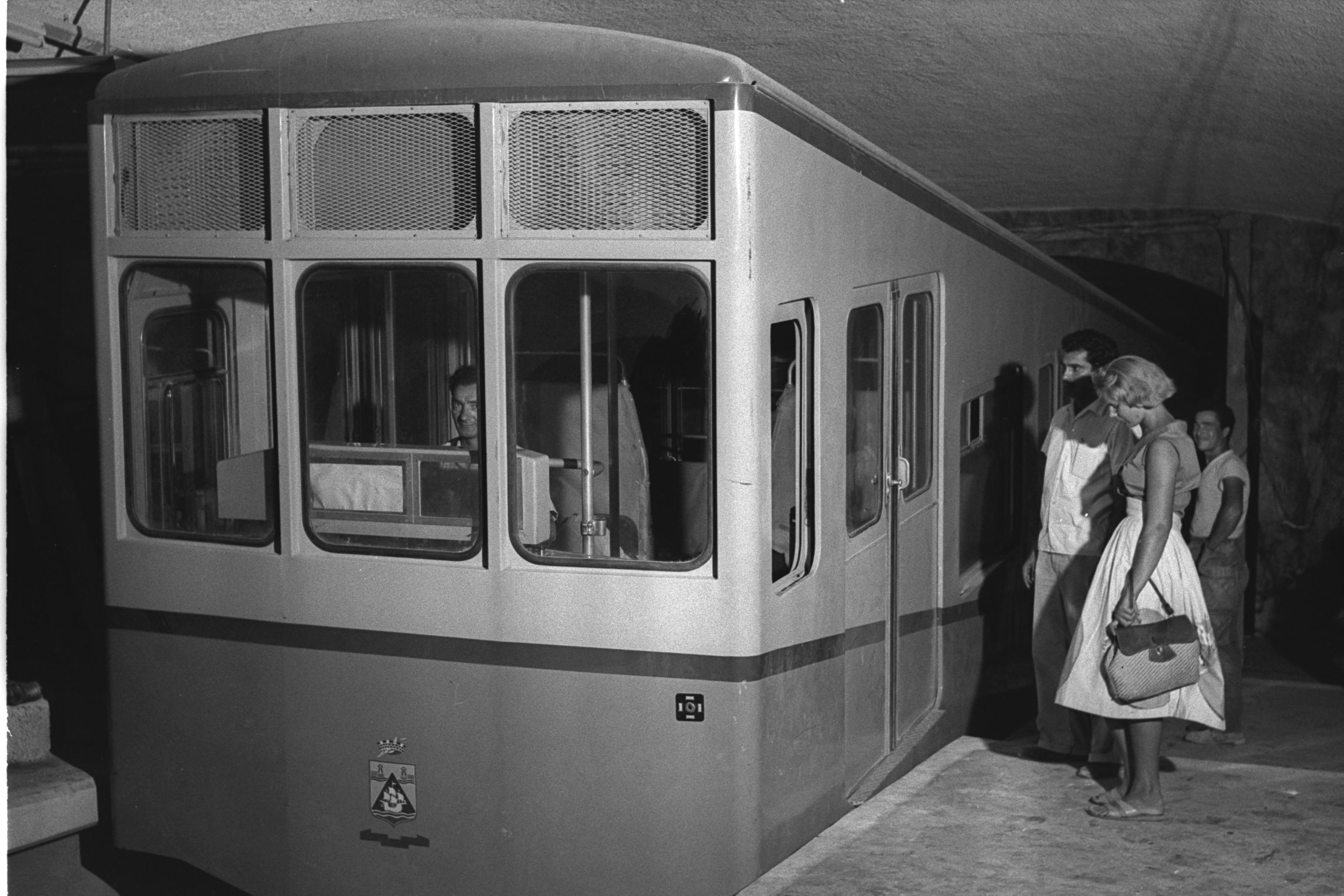
The Carmelit's first day of operation in 1959

== See also ==
- List of funicular railways
- List of rapid transit systems
- Cable cars in Haifa
- Jerusalem Light Rail
- Tel Aviv Light Rail
