= Gan HaEm =

Public gardens in Haifa, Israel

Coordinates: 32.8056°N 34.9869°E

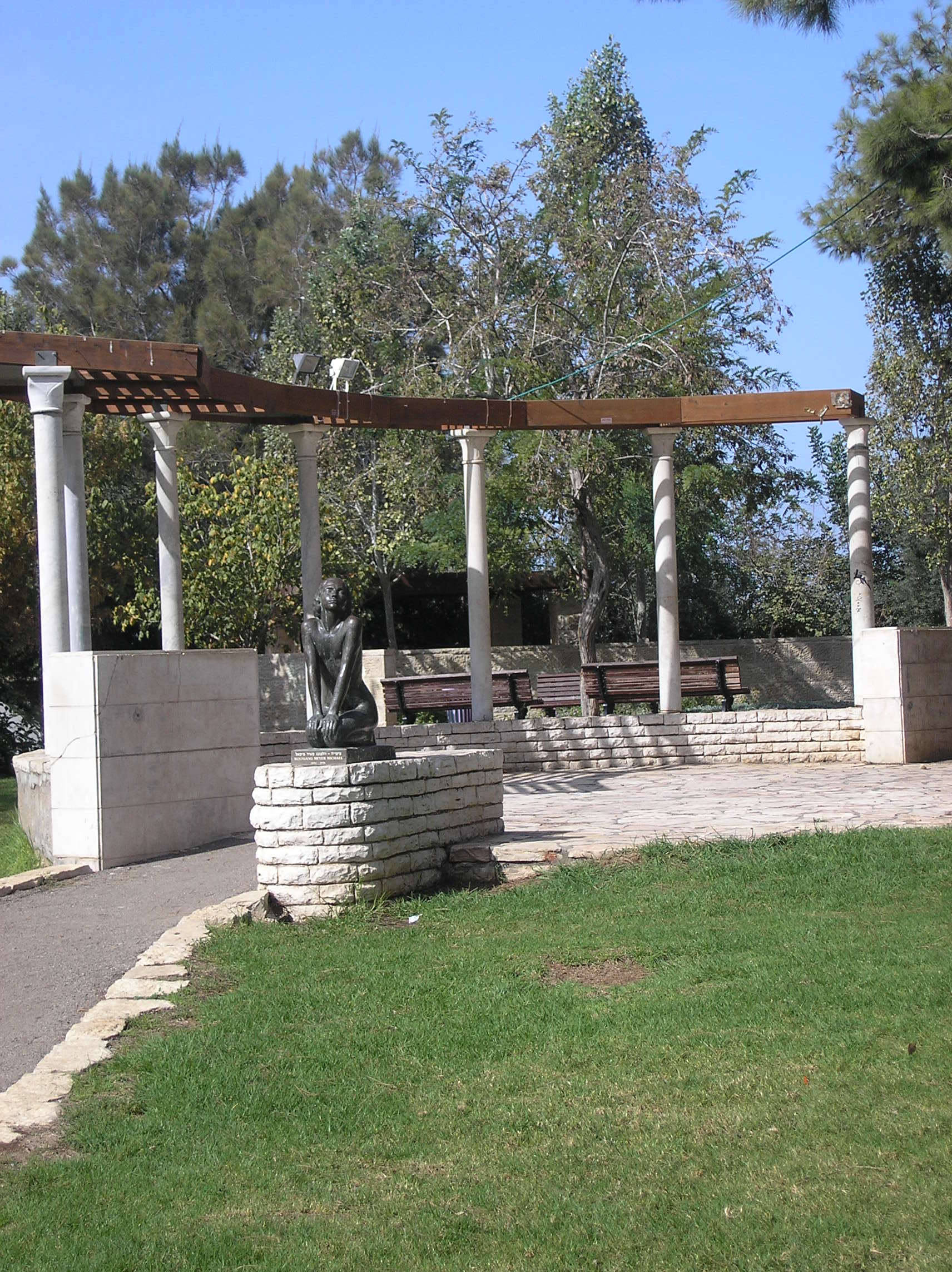
Gan HaEm

Gan HaEm (Hebrew: גן האם, lit. 'Mother's Garden') is a public garden in Haifa, Israel. The garden is located in the Carmel Center neighborhood, near the upper station of the Carmelit. Nearby is Haifa Zoo, the Biological Institute, and the Lotem River. During the year various concerts are held on its public performance stage. The city's Pride Parade culminates in the park.
