= Paris Square (Haifa) =

Square in Haifa, Israel

Coordinates: 32.817566°N 34.999686°E

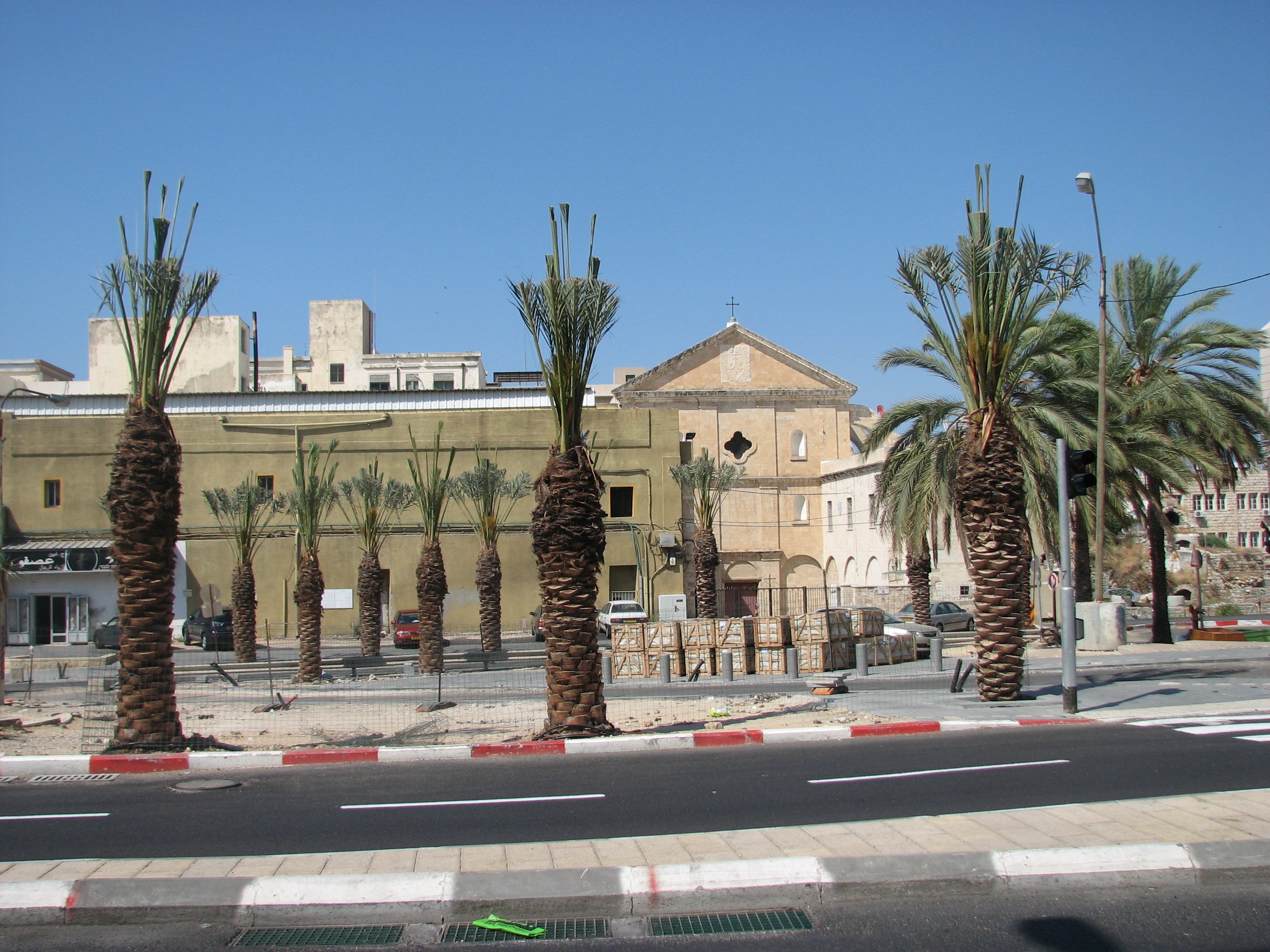
View of the St. Elias Carmelite Church in Paris Square, Haifa.

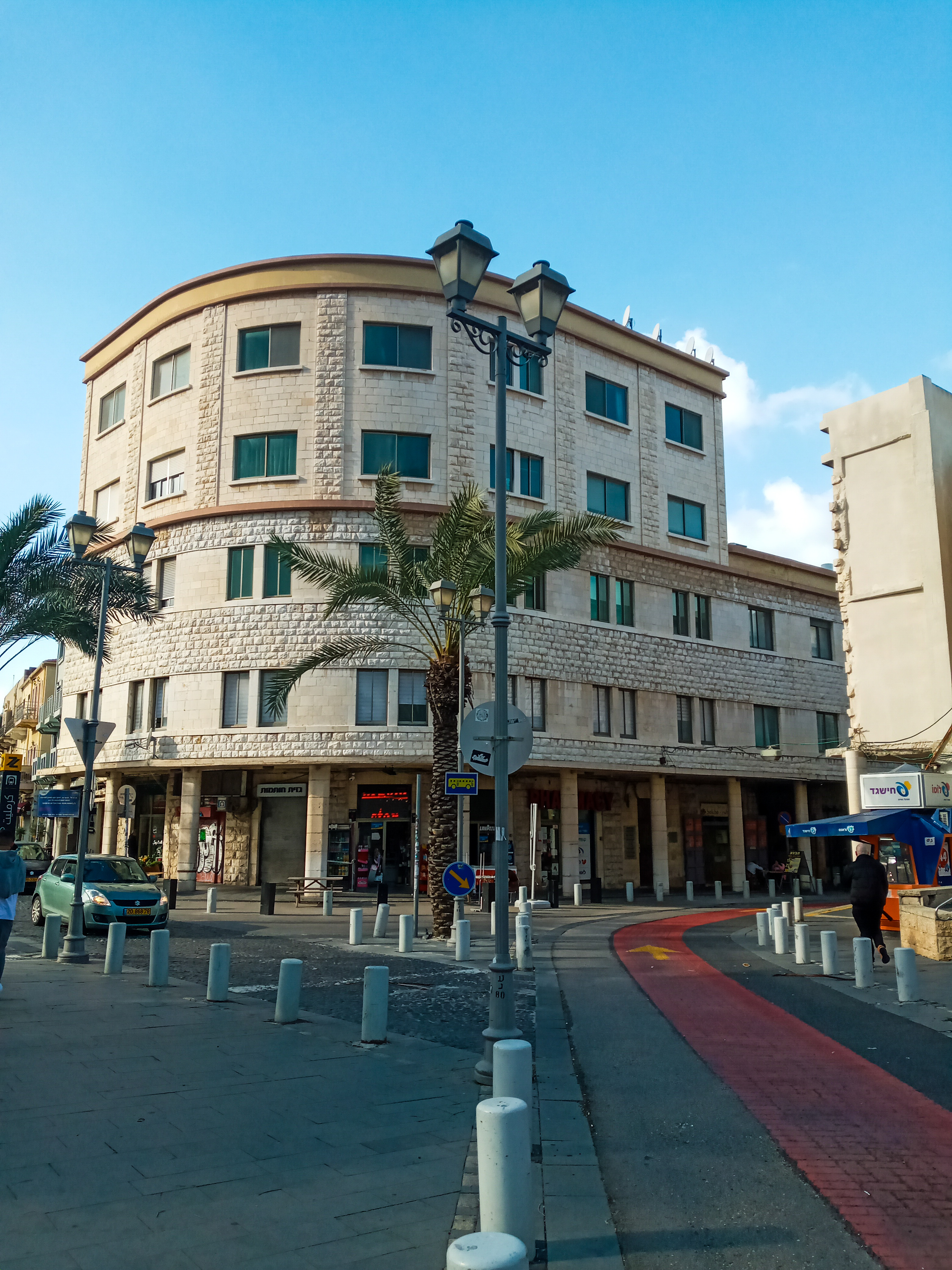
View of the Carmelite Compound.

The Paris Square (Hebrew: כיכר פריז; Arabic: ساحة باريس) also known as Hamra Square or the Churches District is a public square in Haifa, Israel, located in Downtown Haifa. It was built during the Ottoman period.

== History ==
The Hamra Square was a public space created in Haifa during the Ottoman period. It was surrounded by a market, Carmelite (St. Elias Carmelite Church) and Maronite (St. Louis the King Cathedral, Haifa) churches, hotels, etc.

In 1935; the Carmelite order commissioned Italian architect Giovanni Borra to design the area bordering on Paris Square (Khamra) from the north and adjacent to the Carmelite Monastery, which called later the "Carmelite Compound". The buildings were designed in the International Style with Tubzeh (split face) and Musamsam (light chiseled) stone cladding. The result: two spectacular three-story and five-story blocks on the corners that define Eliyahu Hanavi St., surrounded on both sides by a portico and comerece.

In 1954, when the Israeli government commissioned the Carmelit funicular subway system from a French company, it decided to rename the area to Paris Square as a friendly gesture to the French. The station next to the square was named Paris Square as well.

In 2018 the Paris Square Carmelit station was renamed Downtown Station. It is the lower terminus of the Carmelit.

In 2011, the square was renovated, and its reopening ceremony was attended by the mayor of Paris at the time, Bertrand Delanoë.

== Gallery ==
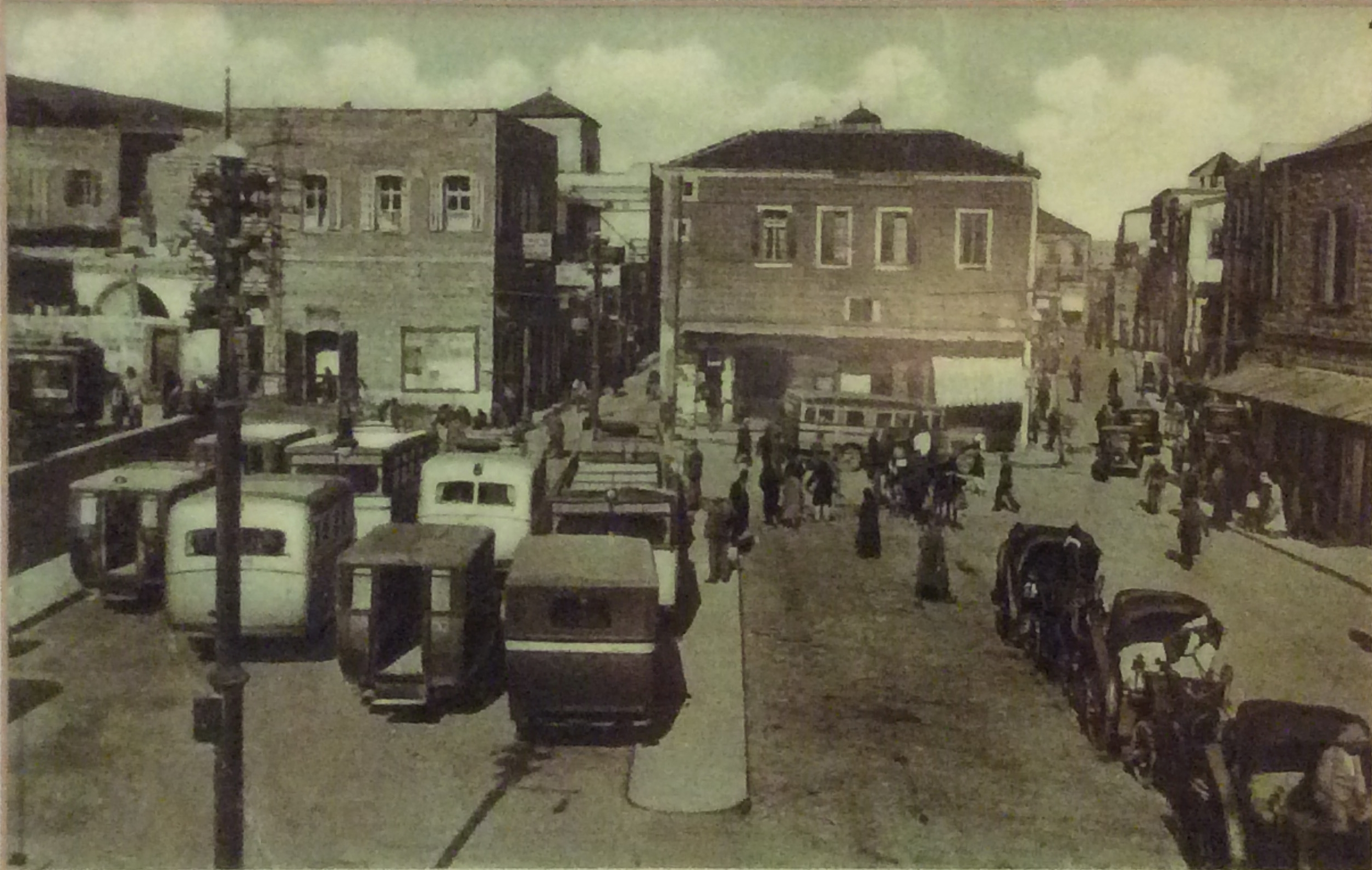
Hamra square in 1920

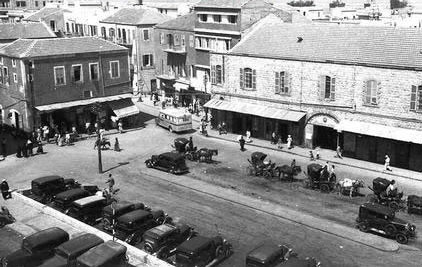
Hamra square in 1934

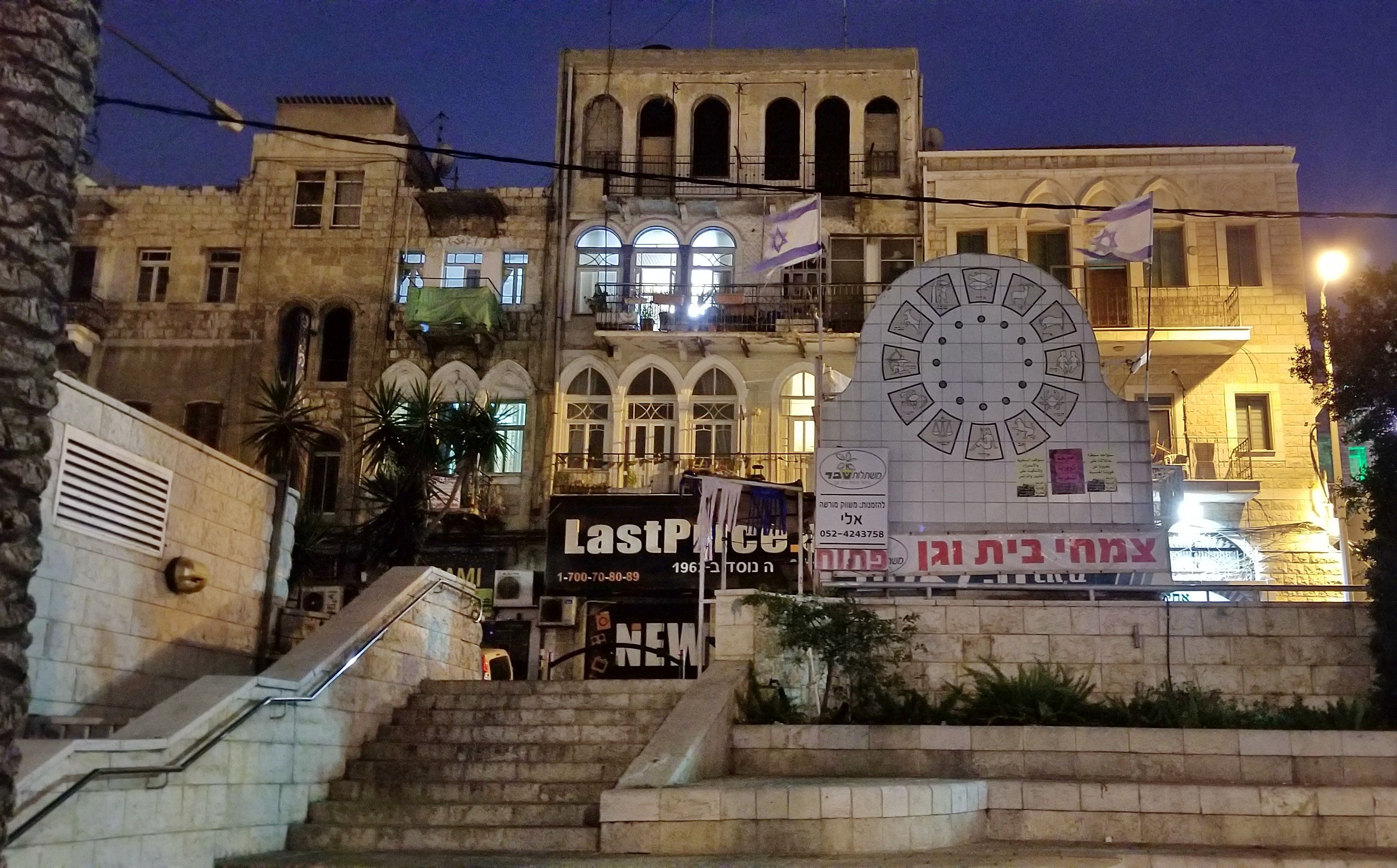
Old house in Paris Square

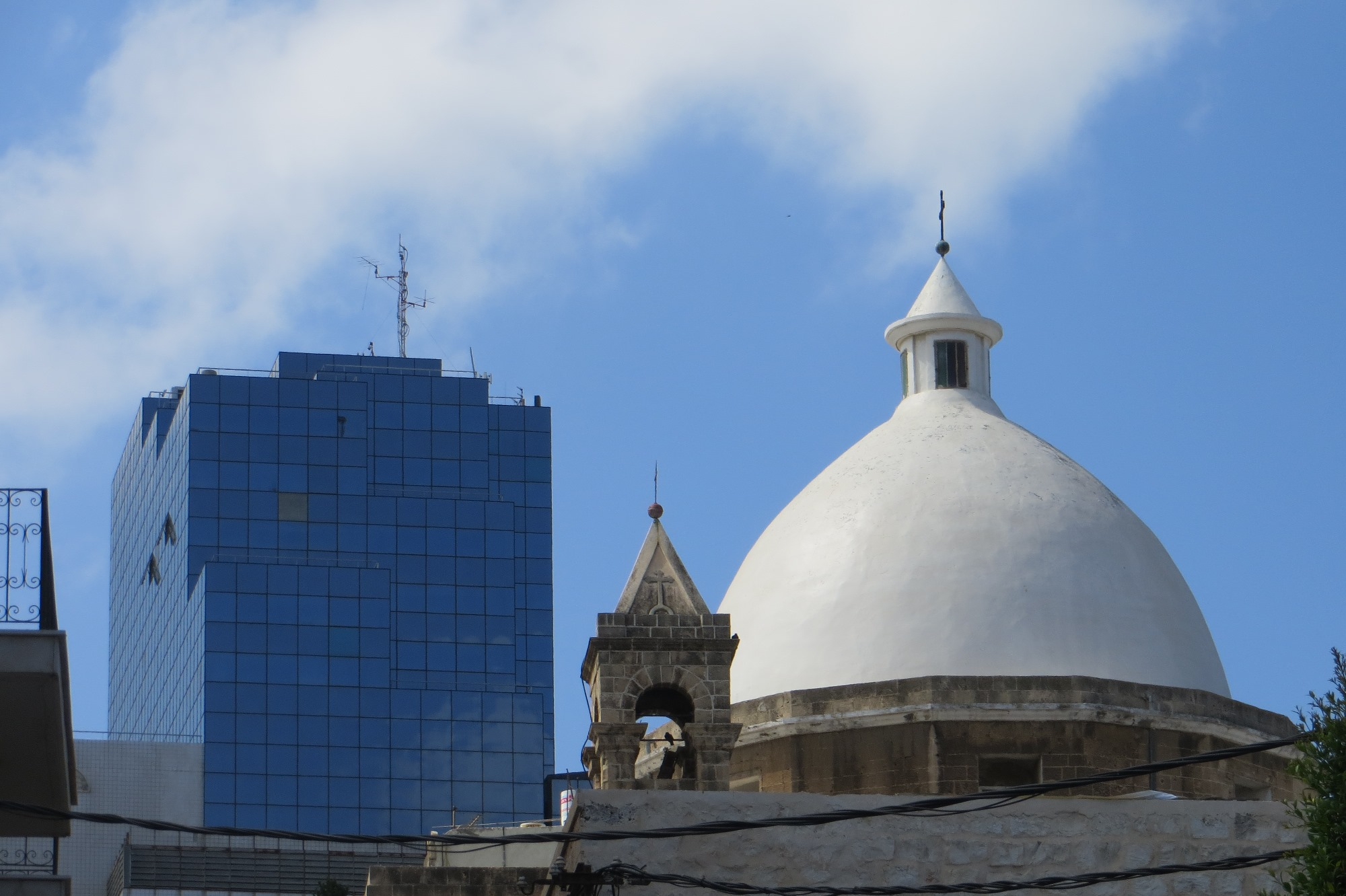
Maronite St. Louis the King Cathedral in Paris Square

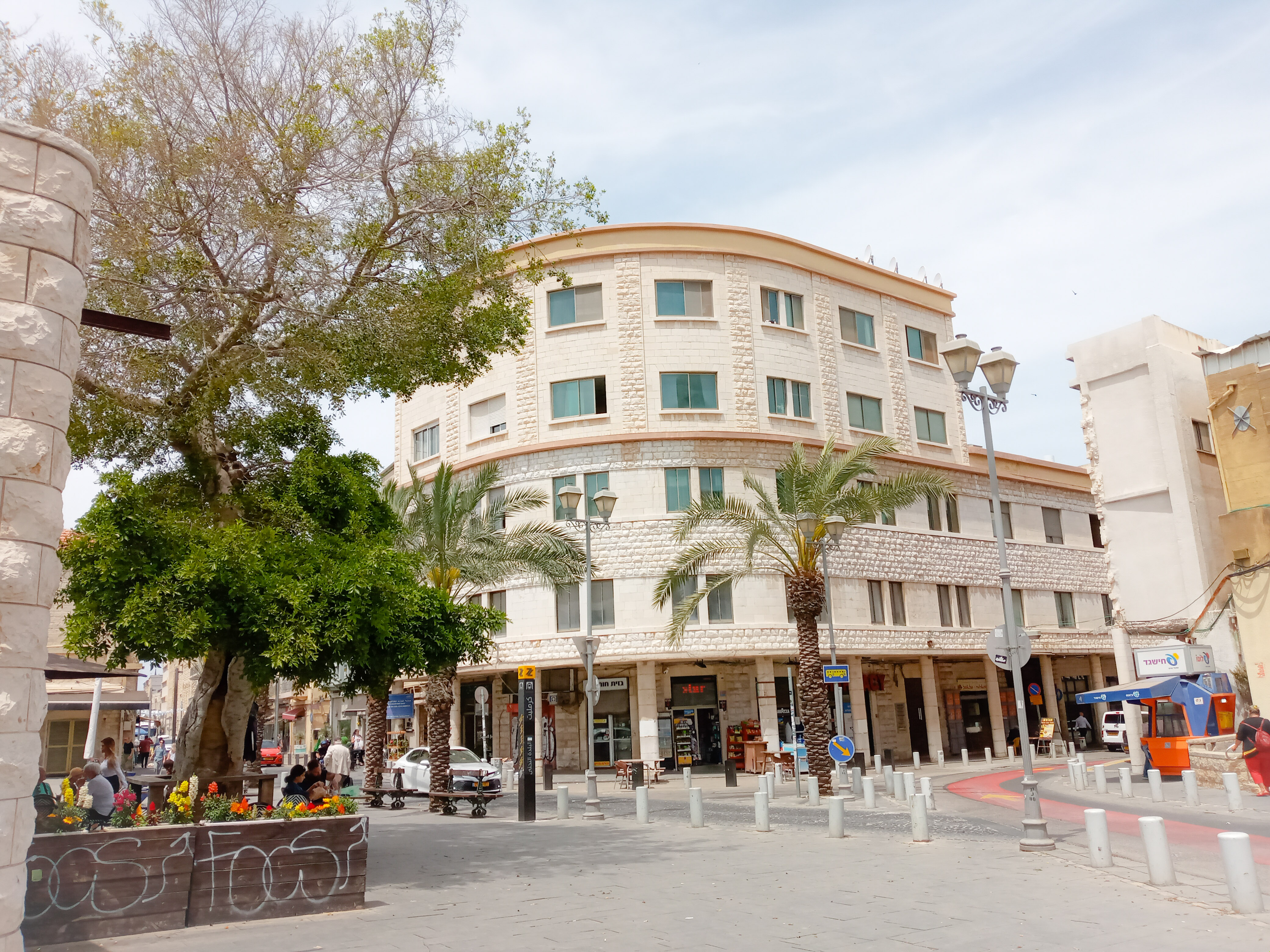
The Carmelite Compound in Paris Square

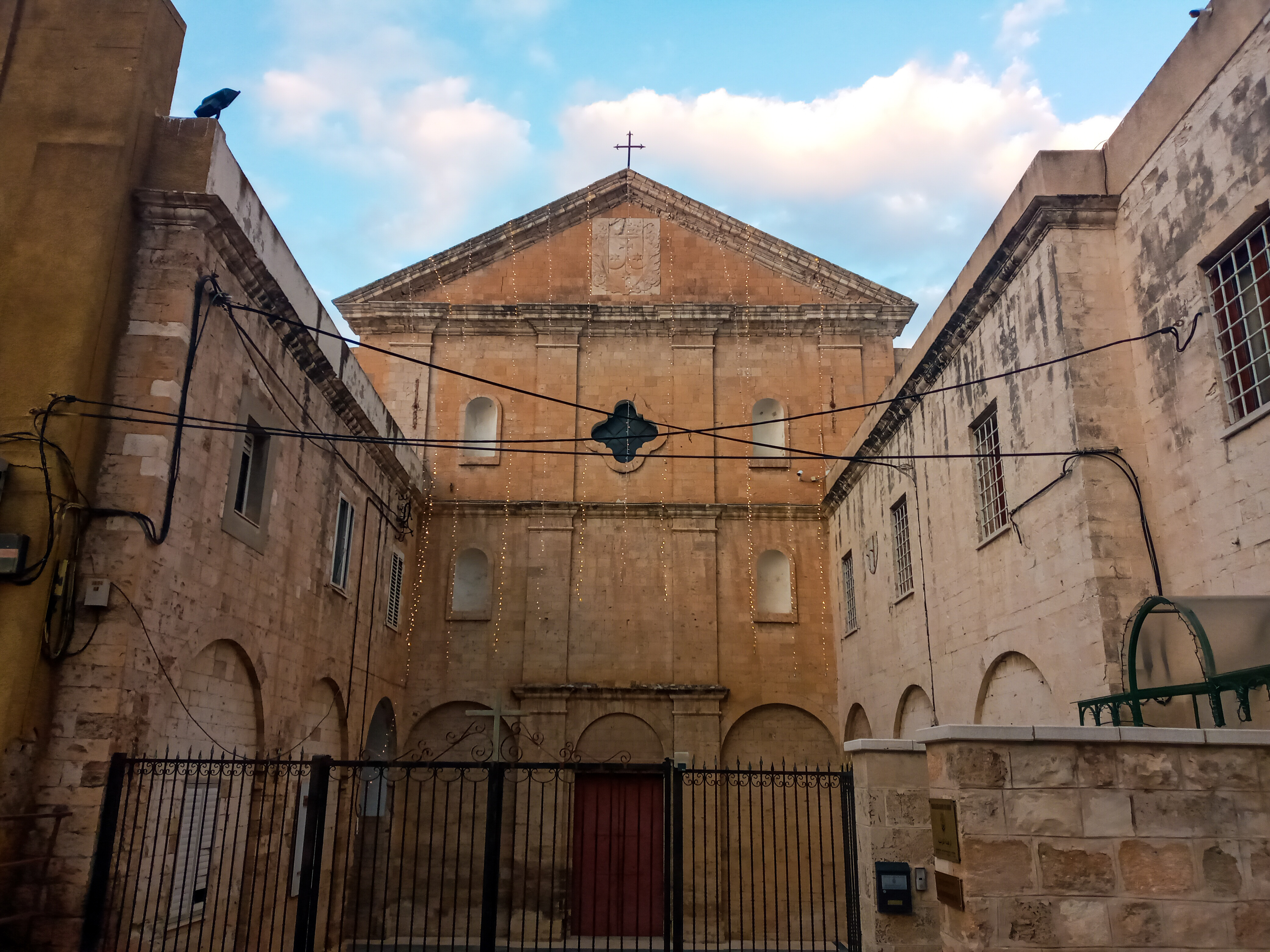
Carmelite Church of Elijah the Prophet in Paris Square

== See also ==
- German Colony, Haifa
- Wadi Nisnas
- Wadi Salib
