= Jewish Agency for Israel =

Zionist non-profit organization

The Jewish Agency for Israel
- הסוכנות היהודית לארץ ישראל
- Founded: 1929; 97 years ago
- Type: Non-profit
- Tax ID no.: 23-7254561
- Legal status: 501(c)(3)
- Headquarters: Jerusalem
- Coordinates: 31.777°N 35.216°E
- Chairman of the Executive: Doron Almog
- Chairman of the Board of Governors: J. David Heller
- Revenue: $381,438,000 (2016)
- Expenses: $333,228,000 (2016)
- Endowment: $1,345,000 _{(2016)}
- Employees: 1,140 (2016)
- Volunteers: 25,000 (2016)
- Website: www.jewishagency.org

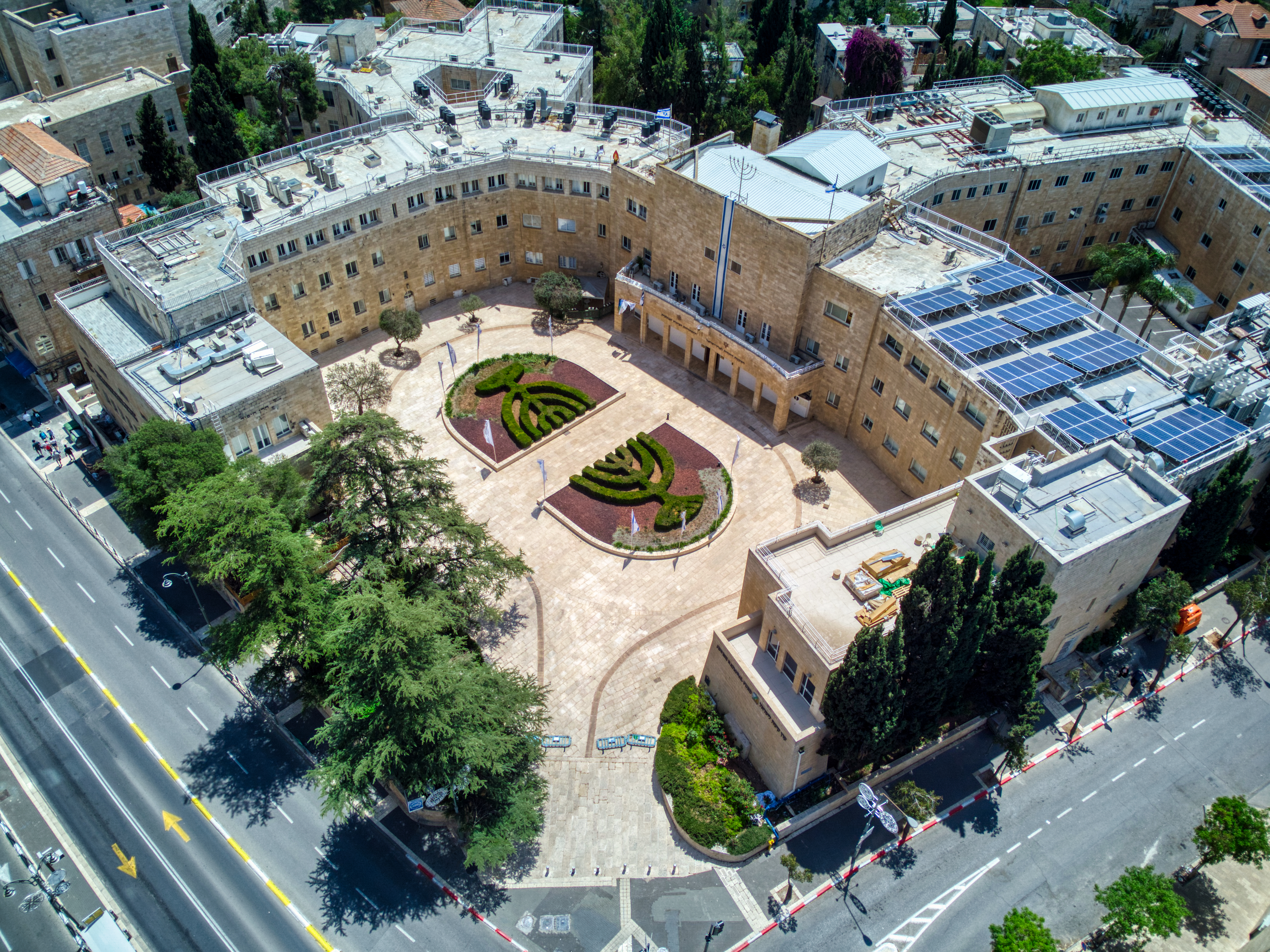
Jewish Agency headquarters, Jerusalem

The Jewish Agency for Israel (Hebrew: הסוכנות היהודית לארץ ישראל, romanized: HaSochnut HaYehudit L'Eretz Yisra'el), formerly known as the Jewish Agency for Palestine, is the largest Jewish non-profit organization in the world. It was established, by the British, in 1929 as the operative branch of the 80,000 Jews in the Yishuv under the World Zionist Organization (WZO).

As an organization, it encourages immigration of Jews in diaspora to the Land of Israel, and oversees their integration with the State of Israel. Since 1948, the Jewish Agency claims to have brought 3 million immigrants to Israel, where it offers them transitional housing in "absorption centers" throughout the country. David Ben-Gurion served as the chairman of its executive committee from 1935, and in this capacity on 14 May 1948, he proclaimed Israel's independence, following which he served as the first Israeli prime minister. In the years preceding the founding of Israel, the Jewish Agency oversaw the establishment of about 1,000 towns and villages in the British Mandate of Palestine. The organization serves as the main link between Israel and Jewish communities around the world.

By law, the Jewish Agency is a parastatal organization, but does not receive core funding from the Israeli government. The Jewish Agency is funded by the Jewish Federations of North America (JFNA), Keren Hayesod, major Jewish communities and federations, and foundations and donors from Israel and around the world. In 2008, the Jewish Agency won the Israel Prize for its historical contribution to Israel and to the Jewish community worldwide.

== History ==
=== Name ===
Established as the Land of Israel Office (Hebrew: המשרד הארץ-ישראלי) of the Zionist Organization in 1908, the organization became the Zionist Commission, then later the Palestine Zionist Executive. The body was designated as the "Jewish agency" responsible for coordinating the establishment of the Jewish National Home provided for in the League of Nations' Mandate for Palestine, and was thus again renamed as The Jewish Agency for Palestine in 1929. After the establishment of the State of Israel, it received its current name: The Jewish Agency for Israel.

=== 1908–1928: Beginnings as an arm of the World Zionist Organization ===
The Jewish Agency began in Jaffa in 1908 as the Palestine Office (Hebrew: המשרד הארץ-ישראלי, HaMisrad HaEretz Yisraeli; lit. 'Office for the Land of Israel'), of the Zionist Organization (ZO) in Ottoman-controlled Palestine. It was headed by Arthur Ruppin and was founded as the operational branch of the ZO, with its main tasks being to represent the Jews of Ottoman Palestine in dealings with the Sultan and other foreign dignitaries, to aid Jewish immigration, and to buy land for Jewish communities to settle in.

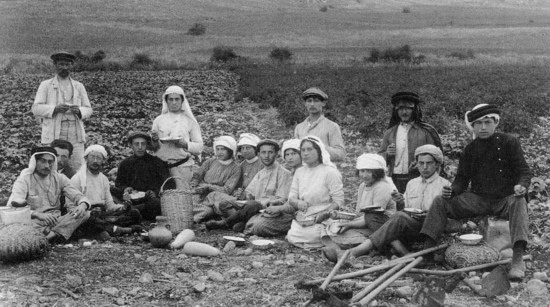
Jewish immigrants of the Second Aliyah, 1912

The Palestine Office was established under the inspiration of Theodor Herzl's vision for a solution to "the Jewish question": the issue of anti-Semitism and the place of Jews in the world. In his pamphlet "The Jewish State," Herzl envisioned the Jewish people settled as an independent nation on its own land, taking its place among the other nation-states of the world. The Palestine Office, which eventually became the Jewish Agency, was based upon Herzl's organizational ideas for how to bring a Jewish state into being.

The influx of Jews during the Second Aliyah (1904–1914) made the purchase of land particularly urgent. With the aid of the Jewish National Fund (JNF) (Hebrew: קֶרֶן קַיֶּימֶת לְיִשְׂרָאֵל, Keren Kayemet L'Yisrael), the Palestine Office bought land for newcomers in two locations: Chavat Kinneret (near the Sea of Galilee), and Kibbutz Ruhama (near Sderot of today). Kibbutz Ruhama was specifically designated for Russian Jews from the Second Aliyah. Over the following decades, the Palestine Office established hundreds more moshavim and kibbutzim and continued to purchase land together with the JNF.

With the outbreak of World War I, the anticipated disintegration of the Ottoman Empire raised hopes among Zionists for increased Jewish immigration and eventual sovereignty in Palestine. In 1917 the United Kingdom captured Jerusalem from the Ottomans, and in 1918 pushed the Ottomans out of the Levant entirely, and the region fell under British military rule. After World War I, the Ottoman Empire is dissolved and the League of Nations create plans for the administration of former Ottoman territory.

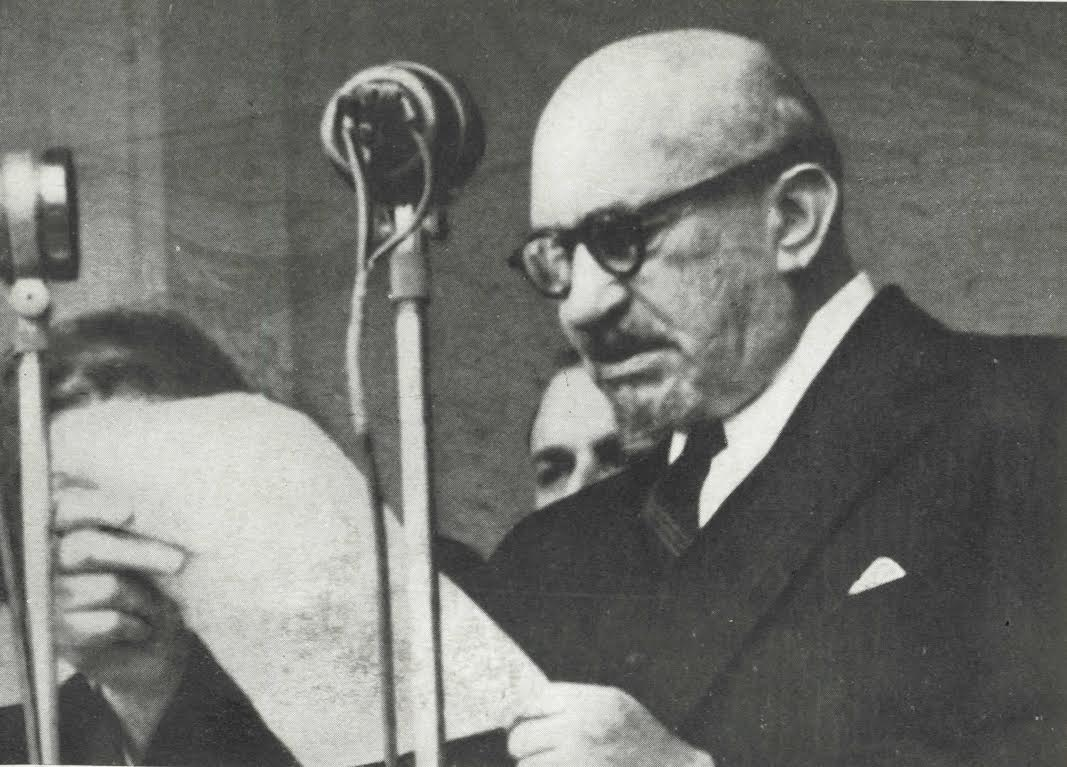
Chaim Weizmann, founder and director of the Zionist Commission (a precursor of the Jewish Agency), leader of the Zionist Organization, and first President of the State of Israel

Following the promulgation of the Balfour Declaration, in which the British government promised to facilitate the establishment of a Jewish National Home in the region, Dr. Chaim Weizmann, president of the British Zionist Federation, formed the Zionist Commission in March 1918 to go to Palestine and make recommendations to the British government. The Commission reached Palestine on 14 April 1918 and proceeded to study conditions and to report to the British government. Weizmann was instrumental in restructuring the ZO's Palestine office into departments for agriculture, settlement, education, land, finance, immigration, and statistics. The Zionist Organization's Palestine Office was merged into the Zionist Commission, headed by Chaim Weizmann.

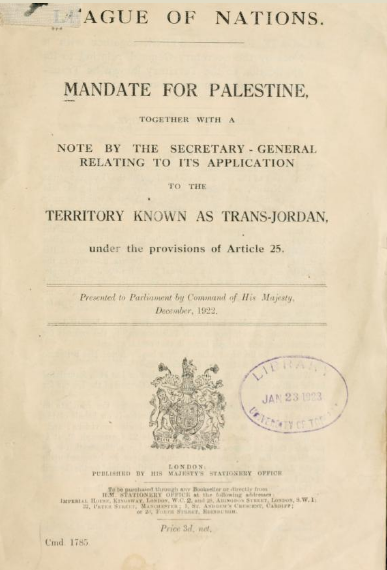
The front page of the Mandate for Palestine and Transjordan memorandum, presented to UK Parliament in December 1922, prior to it coming into force in 1923. The British control of the region lasted until 1948.

On 25 April 1920, the Principal Allied Powers agreed at the San Remo conference on the temporary administration of Ottoman territories by the victorious powers, and assigned Palestine, Transjordan and Iraq as Mandates to Britain. The League of Nations formally approved these mandates in 1922, with the Balfour Declaration and the requirement to create a Jewish National Homeland being incorporated into the Britain's Mandate for Palestine. Article 4 of the Mandate provided for "the recognition of an appropriate Jewish agency as a public body for the purpose of advising and co-operating with the Administration of Palestine in such economic, social and other matters as may affect the establishment of the Jewish National Home and the interests of the Jewish population of Palestine."

In November 1921, the Zionist Commission became the Palestine Zionist Executive and was designated as the "Jewish agency" for the purpose of Article 4 of the League of Nation's Palestine Mandate. The Palestine Zionist Executive was charged with carrying out the duties of the ZO's former Land of Israel Office, namely: facilitating Jewish immigration, land purchases for Jewish communities, and planning the general policies of the Zionist leadership. It ran schools and hospitals, and formed a defence force, the Haganah. Chaim Weizmann was the leader of both the World Zionist Organization and the Palestine Zionist Executive until 1929.

In 1921 Ze'ev Jabotinsky was elected to the executive but he resigned in 1923, accusing Weizmann of not being vigorous enough with the Mandatory Government. Other issues between the Revisionists and the agency were the distribution of entry permits, Weizmann's support for the Zionist Labour Movement, and the proposal to expand the agency. The Revisionists broke completely with agency in 1935, but rejoined ZO in 1947. In 1951 the ZO/JA included all Zionist organizations except the Revisionist Herut party.

=== Jewish Agency for Palestine 1929–1948 ===
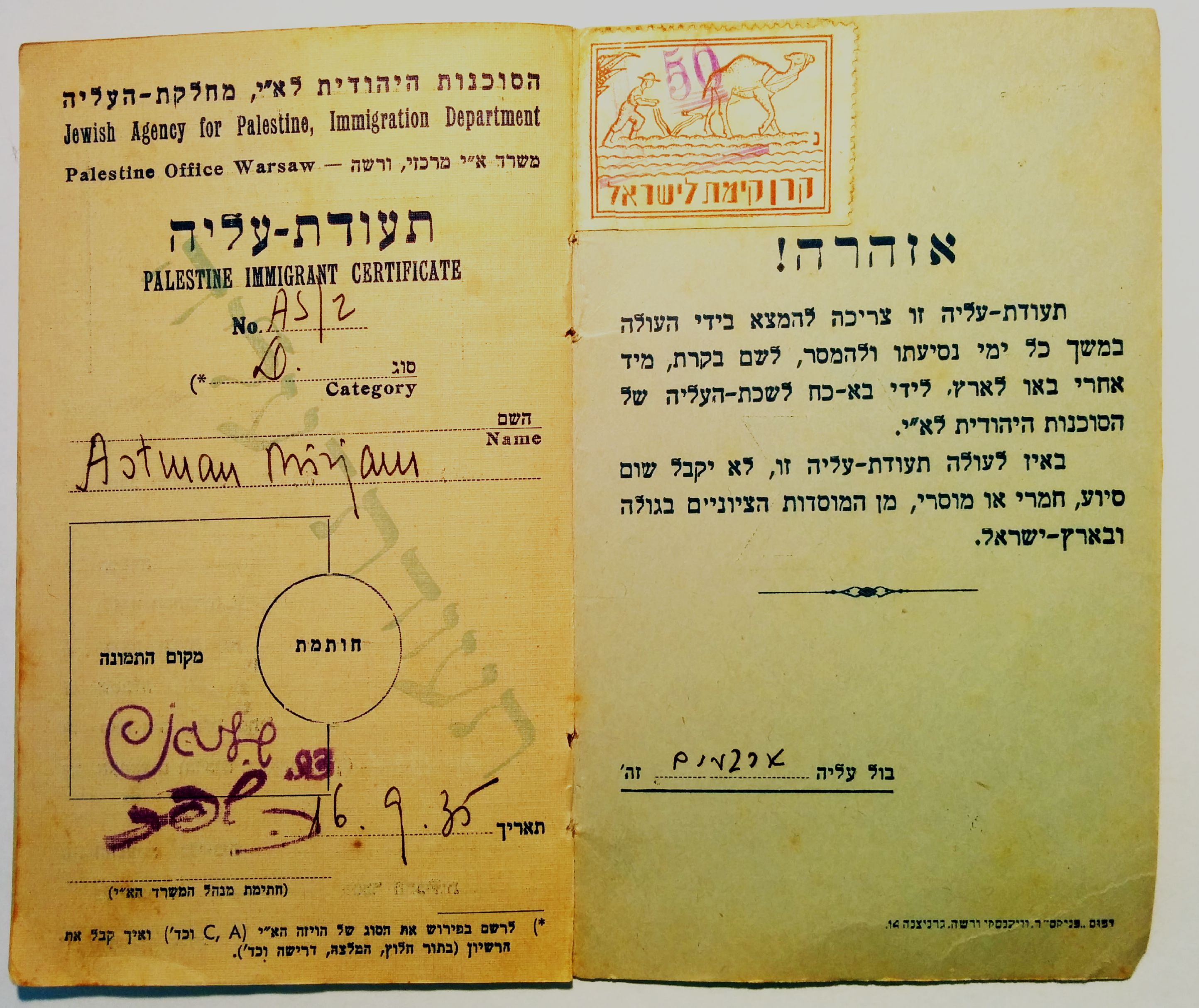
Palestine immigrant certificate issued in Warsaw (16–9–1935) by the Jewish Agency.

In 1929, the 16th Zionist Congress decided to restructure and the rename the Palestine Zionist Executive as The Jewish Agency for Palestine, in reference to its role as the "Jewish agency" required by Article 4 of the League of Nations Mandate. The new Jewish Agency was larger to accommodate the growing logistical task of managing the Yishuv, and also included mandatory representation from non-Zionist Jewish organizations. The change was Chaim Weizmann's initiative, and was established on the principle of parity between Zionist and non-Zionist Jews working together in the building of a Jewish national home.

The 16th Zionist Congress determined that in the event of the future dissolution of the agency, the World Zionist Organization would replace it as representative of the Jews for the purpose of the Mandate.

Weizmann was criticized for being too pro-British. When the 1930 White Paper was published recommending restricting Jewish immigration, his position became untenable and he resigned from the ZO and the Jewish Agency. He protested that the British had betrayed their commitment expressed in the Balfour Declaration and that he could no longer work with them. Nahum Sokolow, who had been elected to succeed Weizmann, remained in his position. Arthur Ruppin succeeded Sokolow as chairman of the Jewish Agency in 1933 and David Ben-Gurion and Moshe Shertok joined the executive. In 1935, Ben-Gurion was elected chairman of the agency to succeed Ruppin.

In 1937 The Peel Commission published its report into the disturbances of the year before. For the first time, partition was recommended. The 20th Zionist Congress, meeting in 1937, hotly debates the Peel Commission and the topic of partition. In a compromise, the Congress rejected the commission's conclusions, demanding a full realization of the requirements of the Mandate; namely, the establishment of a Jewish National Home throughout Mandatory Palestine. However, in a sign of reluctant openness to partition, the Congress also voted to authorize the executive "to enter into negotiations with a view to ascertaining the precise terms of His Majesty‘s government for the proposed establishment of a Jewish state." This decision revealed differences within the Jewish Agency, with some of the non-Zionist faction disagreeing with the decision and some calling for a conference of Jews and Arabs.

==== Non-Zionist representation ====
The new body was larger and was required by its constitution for half of the members of its governing bodies to be made up of Jewish non-Zionist individuals and organizations. Many of the organizations were philanthropic rather than political, and while they were interested in Jewish immigration to the Yishuv, many opposed talk of a Jewish State.

There was strong opposition within the ZO when the idea of enlargement of the board of governors of the Jewish Agency was first raised in 1924 to include non-Zionist Jews, but the idea was accepted by the Zionist Congress in 1927.

Even though non-Zionists took part in the agency, it was still closely tied to the Zionist Organization. The president of the ZO served as the chair of the Executive Council and the Assembly of the Jewish Agency, and the half of its membership that was designated for Zionists was selected by the ZO. The two bodies cooperated closely.

Those participating included Sholem Asch, H.N. Bialik, Leon Blum, Albert Einstein, Immanuel Löw, Lord Melchett and Herbert Samuel. American non-Zionists received 44 of the 112 seats allotted to non-Zionists. The British Board of Deputies joined as a constituent body.

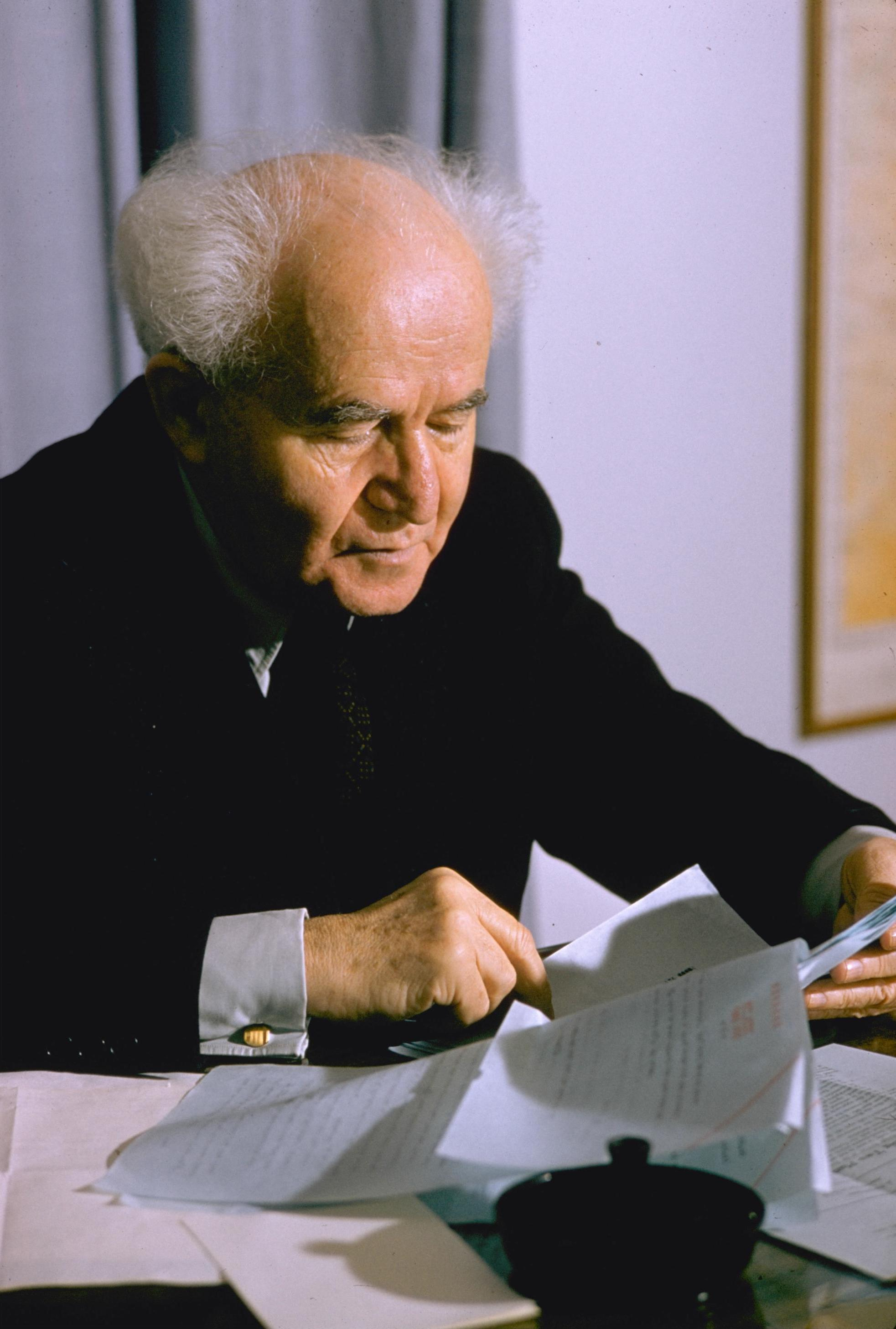
David Ben-Gurion was Chairman of the Executive of the Jewish Agency from 1935 to 1948. Upon the founding of the State of Israel, he left his position to become the first Prime Minister of the state.

In 1947 the last non-Zionist member of the Jewish Agency, Werner Senator, resigned and while the 50 percent participation of non-Zionists in the Agency before had not worked in practice, the Jewish Agency and the World Zionist Organization now became de facto identical.

==== Organization ====
From 1929 to 1948, the Jewish Agency was organized into four departments: the Government Department (performing foreign relations on behalf of the Jewish community of Palestine); the Security Department; the Aliyah Department, and the Education Department. The Jewish Agency Executive included David Ben-Gurion as chairman, and Rabbi Yehuda Leib Maimon and Yitzhak Gruenbaum, among others. The Jewish Agency was (and is still) housed in a fortress-like building in the Rehavia neighborhood of Jerusalem. The land for the Rehavia neighborhood had been purchased in 1922 by the Palestine Land Development Corporation, and construction of the Jewish Agency headquarters was paid for by the ZO. The three-winged structure with a large open courtyard was designed by Yochanan Rattner. Along with the Jewish Agency it also houses the headquarters of the JNF and Keren Hayesod-United Israel Appeal.

==== Bombing ====
On March 11, 1948, a bomb planted in the courtyard of the building by Arab militants killed 13 and wounded many others. The Keren Hayesod wing was completely destroyed. Leib Yaffe, director-general of Keren Hayesod, was among those killed in the bombing.

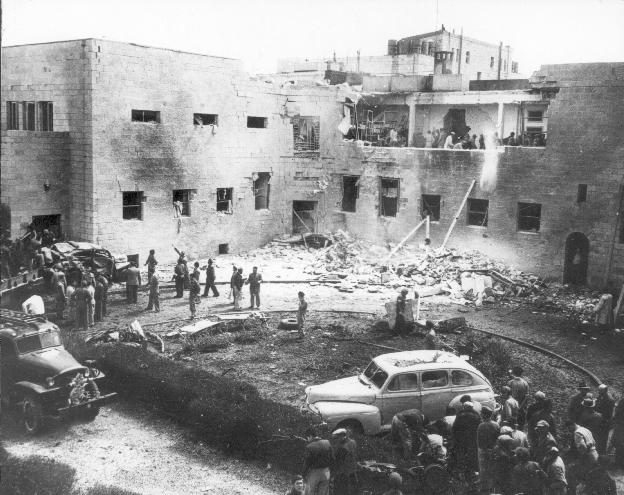
Offices of the Jewish Agency in Jerusalem following car bomb 11 March 1948

The building continues to serve as the headquarters of the Jewish Agency as of 2019. Another building "Kiriyat Moria" is located in southern-east Jerusalem, Armon Hanatziv, Ha-Askan 3. The organization also has satellite sites worldwide.

==== Pre-state immigration and settlement 1934–1948 ====
Throughout the years 1934–1948, in a phenomenon known as the Ha'apala (ascension), the Jewish Agency facilitated clandestine immigration beyond the British quotas. In 1938 it established HaMosad LeAliyah Bet ('המוסד לעלייה ב, lit. Institution for Immigration B), which took charge of the effort. Overall, in these years, the agency, in partnership with other organizations, helped over 150,000 people in their attempt to enter Palestine, organizing a total of 141 voyages on 116 ships. The potential immigrants were Jews fleeing the Holocaust and, after the war, refugees from displaced persons camps who sought a home in Palestine. Most of the Ma'apilim ships (of the Ha'apala movement) were intercepted by the British, but a few thousand Jews did manage to slip past the authorities. The operation as a whole also helped to unify the long-standing Jewish community in Palestine as well as the newcomer Jewish refugees from Europe.

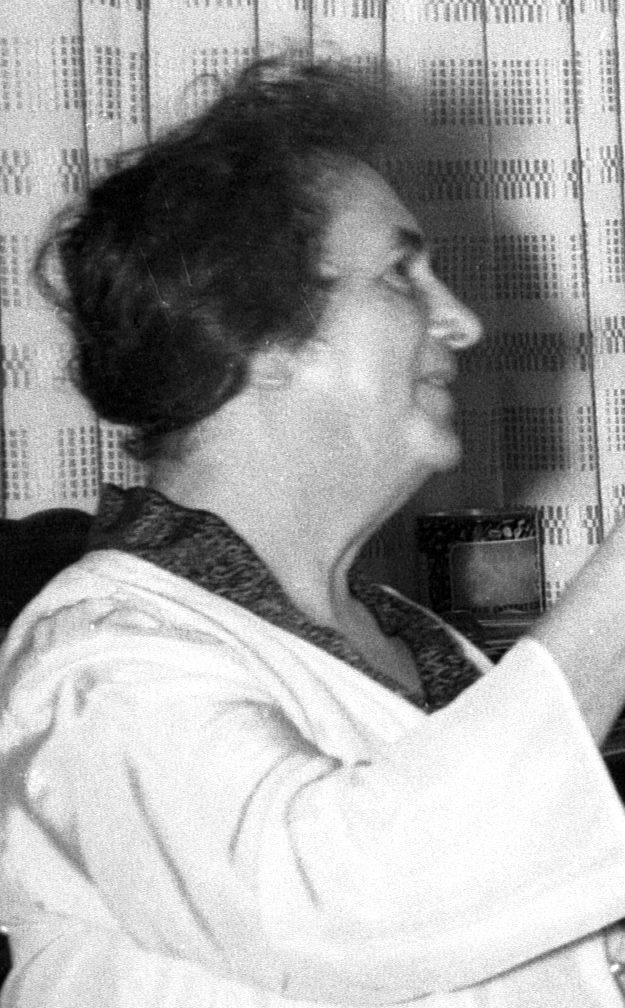
Recha Freier, founder of Youth Aliyah, circa 1964. Youth Aliyah saved more than 5,000 young European Jews by bringing them to Palestine in the years preceding the Holocaust.

In these years The agency made use of the "tower and stockade" (Hebrew: חומה ומגדל) method to establish dozens of new Jewish settlements literally overnight, without obtaining permission from the Mandate authorities. These settlements were built on land purchased by the JNF and relied on an Ottoman law stating that any building with a full roof could not be torn down.

In 1933 the Jewish Agency negotiated a Ha'avara (Transfer) Agreement with Nazi Germany under which approximately 50,000 German Jews were allowed to immigrate to Palestine and retain some of their assets as German export goods.

In 1943, the Jewish Agency's Henrietta Szold joined Recha Freier in developing the Youth Aliyah program, which between 1933 and 1948 rescued more 5,000 young Jews from Europe, brought them to Palestine, and educated them in special boarding schools. According to Professor Dvora Hacohen, between 1933 and 2011 the Youth Aliyah movement helped over 300,000 young people make Aliyah.

When World War II broke out, the Jewish Agency established a committee to aid European Jewry by finding them entry permits to Palestine, sending them food, and maintaining contact. The agency also helped recruit 40,000 members of the Palestinian Jewish community (a full 8 percent of the Jewish population of Palestine) to be trained by the British military and aid in the Allies' struggle against the Nazis; most served in the Middle East and Africa, but some served behind enemy lines in Europe, among them a group of 32 parachutists that included Hannah Szenes. In total, 800 were killed in their efforts.

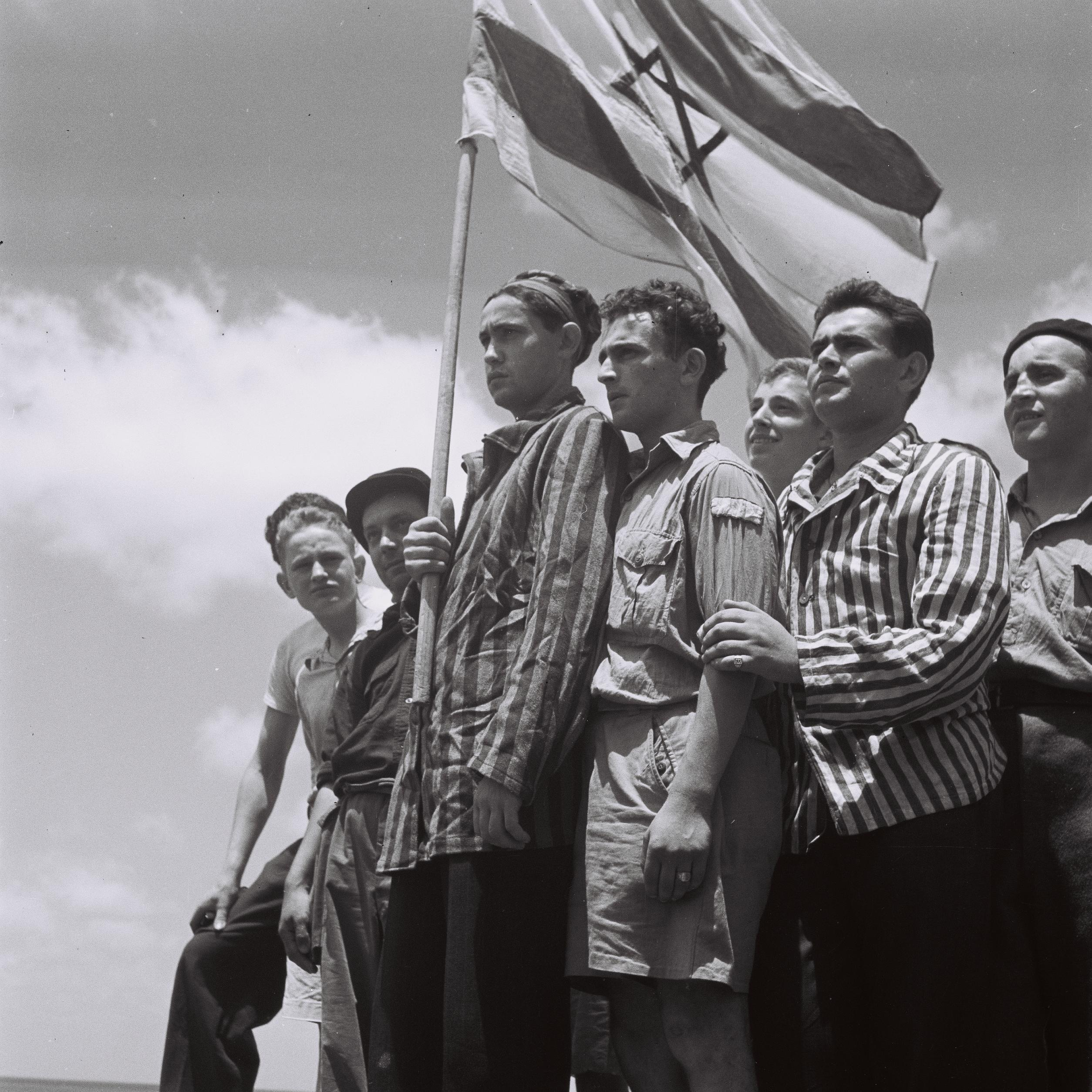
Survivors of the Buchenwald concentration camp arriving in Palestine in 1945. Since their immigration was illegal, they were arrested by the British.

When World War II ended the Agency continued to aid illegal immigration to Palestine through HaMossad LeAliyah Bet in an effort known as the Bricha. Between 1945 and 1948 the Jewish Agency sent 66 ships of refugees to Palestine. Most were intercepted by British authorities, who placed the illegal immigrants, who had just survived the Holocaust, in detention camps in Palestine and later in Cyprus. Only with the establishment of the State of Israel were the detainees allowed to enter the country.

==== Resistance and formation of Israel's first government ====
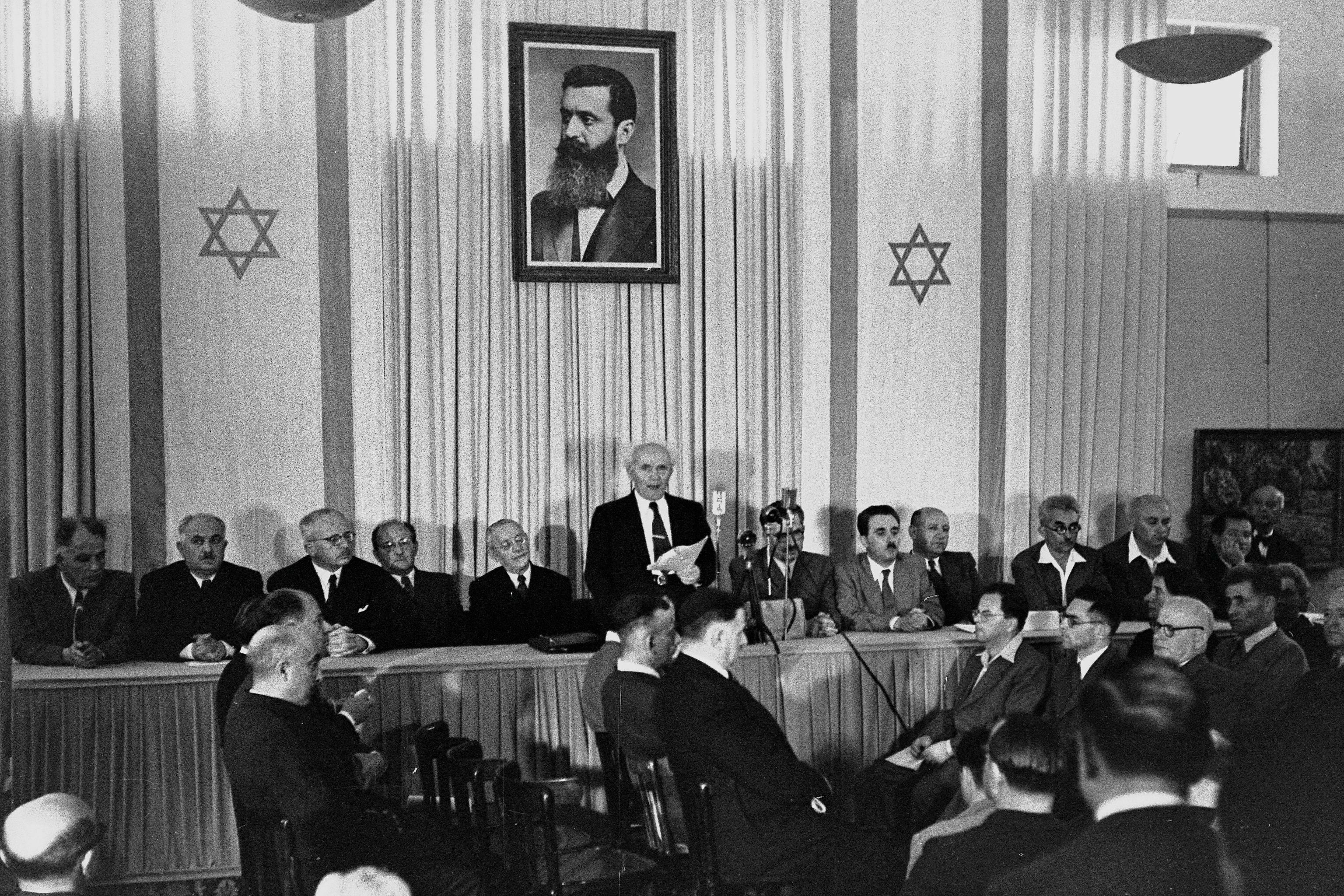
David Ben-Gurion, Chairman of the Jewish Agency, declaring the establishment of the State of Israel, in Tel Aviv, May 14, 1948. Ben-Gurion became Israel's first Prime Minister.

Frustrated with the United Kingdom's continued anti-Zionist stance, the Jewish Agency helped put together an agreement signed by the Hagannah, the Irgun, and the Lehi to form a United Resistance Movement against the British. In 1946 British troops raided Jewish Agency headquarters as part of Operation Agatha, a broad effort to quash Jewish resistance in Palestine. Important figures in The Agency including Moshe Sharett, head of the agency's political department, and Dov Yosef, member of the agency's executive committee, were arrested and imprisoned in Latrun.

The United Nations recommended the partition of Palestine on 29 November 1947. Meanwhile, the Jewish Agency collaborated with the Jewish National Council to set up a People's Council (Mo'ezet Ha'am) and National Administration (Minhelet Ha'am). After the declaration of independence on 14 May 1948, these two bodies formed the provisional government of the State of Israel.

=== The Jewish Agency for Israel ===
==== Post-State immigration, settlement, and infrastructure ====
Following the establishment of the State of Israel in 1948, the Jewish Agency for Israel shifted its focus to facilitating economic development and absorbing immigrants. Organizationally, it changed its structure: The Aliyah Department remained, as well as the Education Department (which promoted Jewish and Zionist education in the diaspora), but the Security and Government Departments were replaced by the Department of Agriculture and Settlement, and by the Israel Department (supporting activities that help vulnerable populations within Israel).

The agency's budget in 1948 was IL 32 million; its funding came from Keren Hayesod, the JNF, fund-raising drives, and loans.

In 1949, the Jewish Agency brought 239,000 Holocaust survivors, from DP camps in Europe and detention camps in Cyprus, to Israel. In the years following Israel's founding, Jews in many Arab countries suffered from violence and persecution, and fled or were driven from their homes. The agency helped to airlift 49,000 Yemenite Jews to Israel on Operation Magic Carpet, and over the next few years brought hundreds of thousands of Jewish refugees to Israel from Northern Africa, Turkey, Iraq, and Iran.

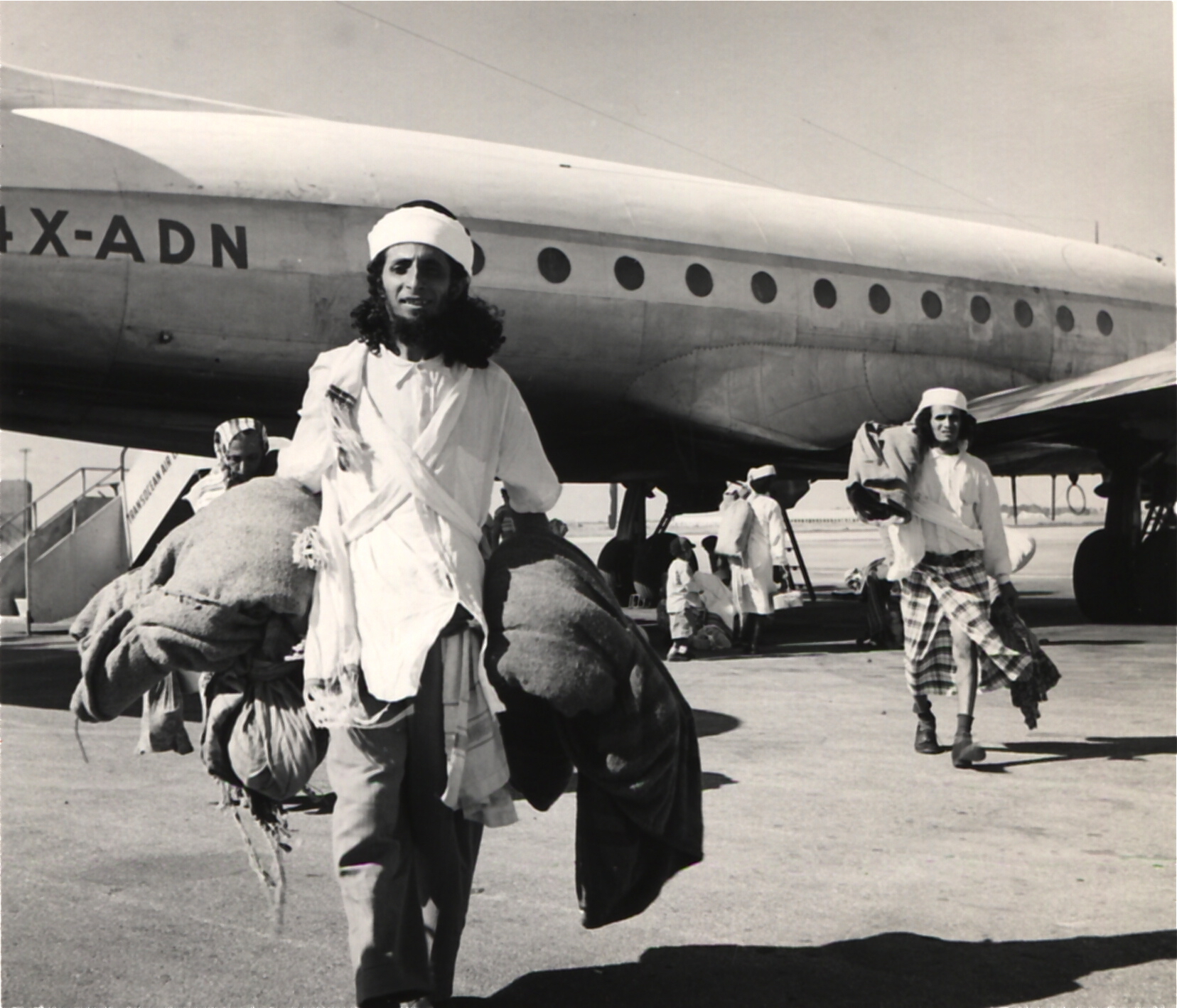
Yemenite Jews arriving in Israel through Operation Magic Carpet.

Between 1948 and 1952, about 700,000 immigrants arrived in the new state. The Jewish Agency helped these immigrants acclimate to Israel and begin to build new lives. It established schools to teach them Hebrew, beginning with Ulpan Etzion in 1949. (The first student to register for Ulpan Etzion was Ephraim Kishon.) It also provided them with food, housing, and vocational training. For a time the construction of new housing could not keep up with demand, and many of the new immigrants were placed in temporary ma'abarot, or transit camps.

In 1952, the "Zionist Organization-Jewish Agency for Israel Status Law" was passed by the Knesset formalizing the roles of each group. It was agreed that the WZO and the Jewish Agency would continue to supervise Aliyah, absorption, and settlement, while the state would handle all other matters previously dealt with by The agency including security, education, and employment. Article 4 of the Status Law stipulated that the World Zionist Organization (clarified in Article 3 as "also the Jewish Agency") is an "authorized agency" of the State, establishing its ongoing parastatal rather than purely nongovernmental status.

In the early years of the state the Jewish Agency aided in the establishment of a variety of different institutions that developed the country's economic and cultural infrastructure. These included El Al, the national airline; Binyanei HaUma, the national theater and cultural center; and museums, agricultural, and land development companies.

In the years after 1948, the Agency's Department of Agricultural Settlement established an additional 480 new towns and villages throughout Israel. It provided them with equipment, livestock, irrigation infrastructure, and expert guidance. By the late 1960s these towns produced 70% of Israel's total agricultural output.

The agency also focused its energies on Jews outside of Israel. The Department for Education and Culture in the Diaspora and the Department of Torah Education and Culture in the Diaspora were created to help replace the loss of centers of Jewish learning destroyed by the Holocaust. They trained Hebrew teachers; sent Israelis abroad to supplement Diaspora schools, camps, and youth organizations; and trained cantors, shochatim (ritual slaughterers) and mohelim (ritual circumcisers) in Diaspora communities.

==== Immigration and absorption, 1967–1990s ====
Jewish pride and euphoria following Israel's dramatic victory in the Six Day War of 1967 prompted a new wave of immigration. In order to aid in the absorption of this influx of immigrants, the Israeli government's Ministry for Absorption was created in June 1968, taking over some aspects of absorption from The Agency and the ZO.

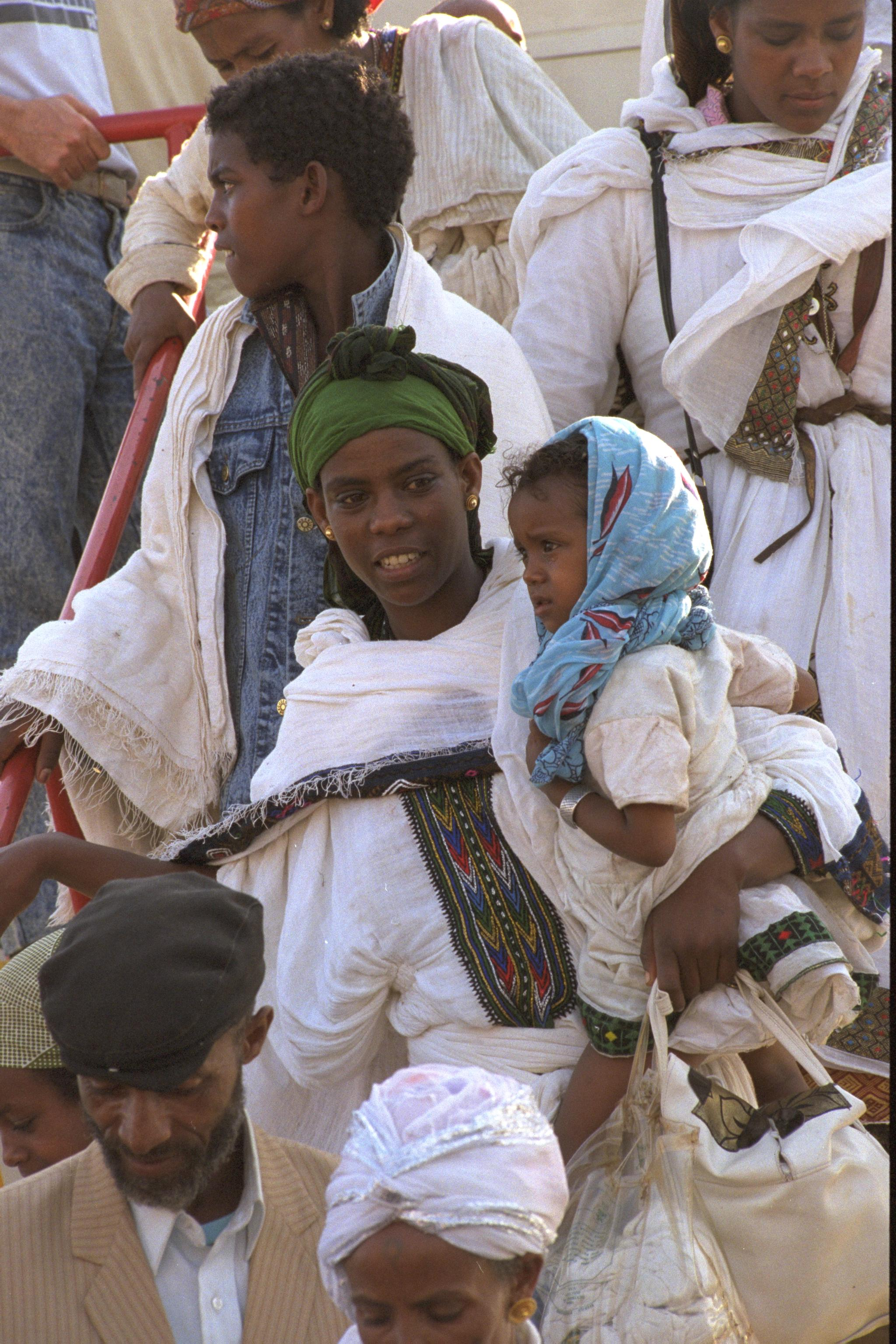
Ethiopian Jews arriving in Israel from Addis Ababa, through Operation Solomon, 1991

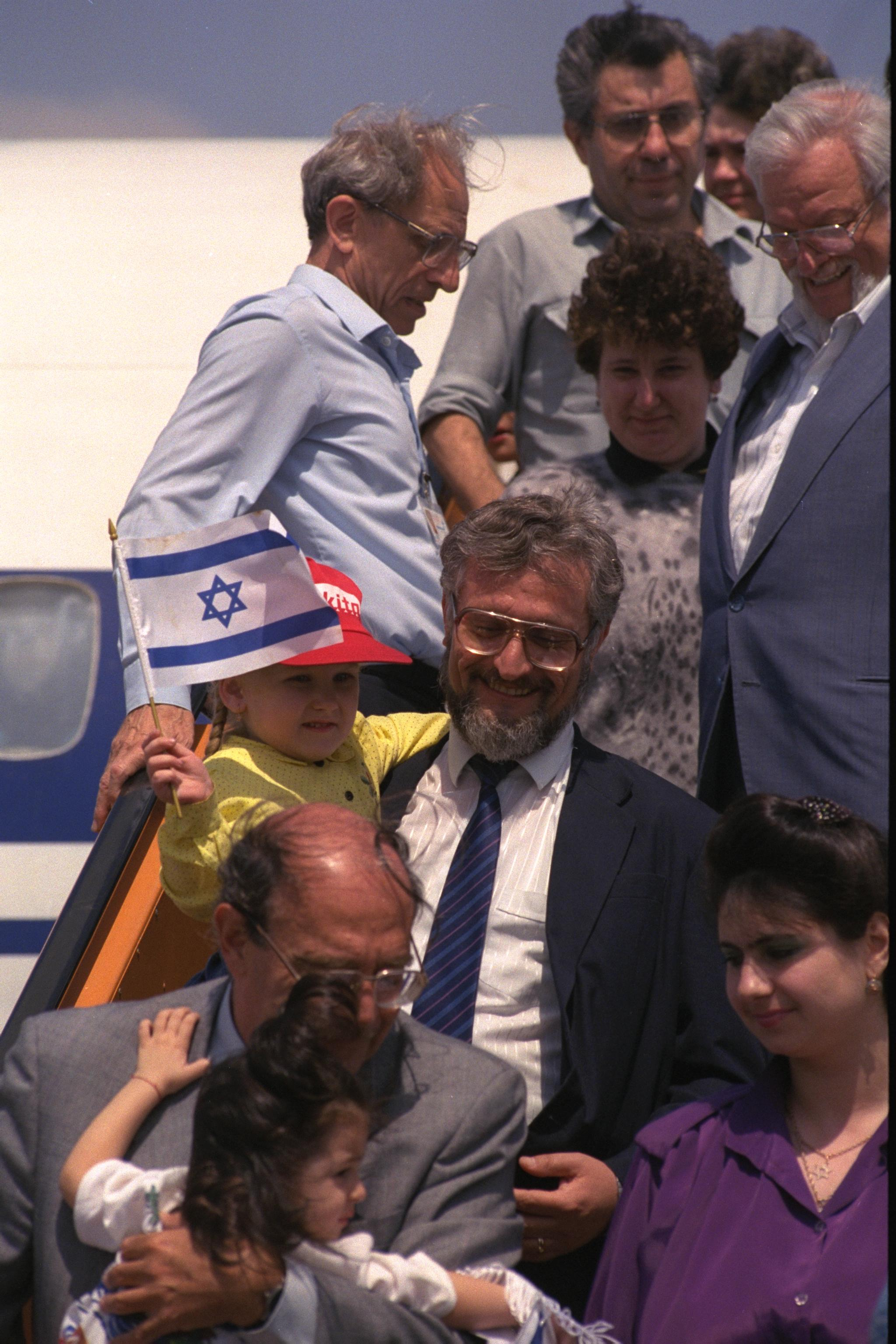
Jewish Agency representatives disembark at Ben-Gurion Airport together with immigrants from the Jewish Autonomous Oblast, 1993

In the 1980s, the Jewish Agency began to bring the Ethiopian Jewish Community to Israel. On Operation Moses and Operation Joshua more than 8,000 immigrants were airlifted out of Ethiopia. In 1991 about 14,400 Ethiopian Jews were flown to Israel in the space of 36 hours on Operation Solomon. Since then, a steady trickle of immigrants have been brought to Israel from Ethiopia by the Jewish Agency. The agency has taken charge of housing them in absorption centers, teaching them Hebrew, helping them find employment and in general easing their integration into Israeli society. In 2013 most of the "olim," or new immigrants, in absorption centers are from Ethiopia.

With the collapse of the Soviet Union in the late 1980s, Russian and Eastern European Jews began to stream to Israel in the tens of thousands. In 1990, about 185,000 immigrants arrived from the FSU; in the following year, nearly 150,000 came; and for the rest of the decade a steady average of 60,000 immigrants from the region made their way to Israel every year. Since the fall of the Berlin Wall in 1989, nearly a million Jews and their family members from the former Soviet Union have made Aliyah, presenting tremendous absorption challenges. The Jewish Agency has helped them to integrate through a variety of programs including Hebrew language instruction, placement in absorption centers, and job training.

==== Program expansion, 1990s–today ====
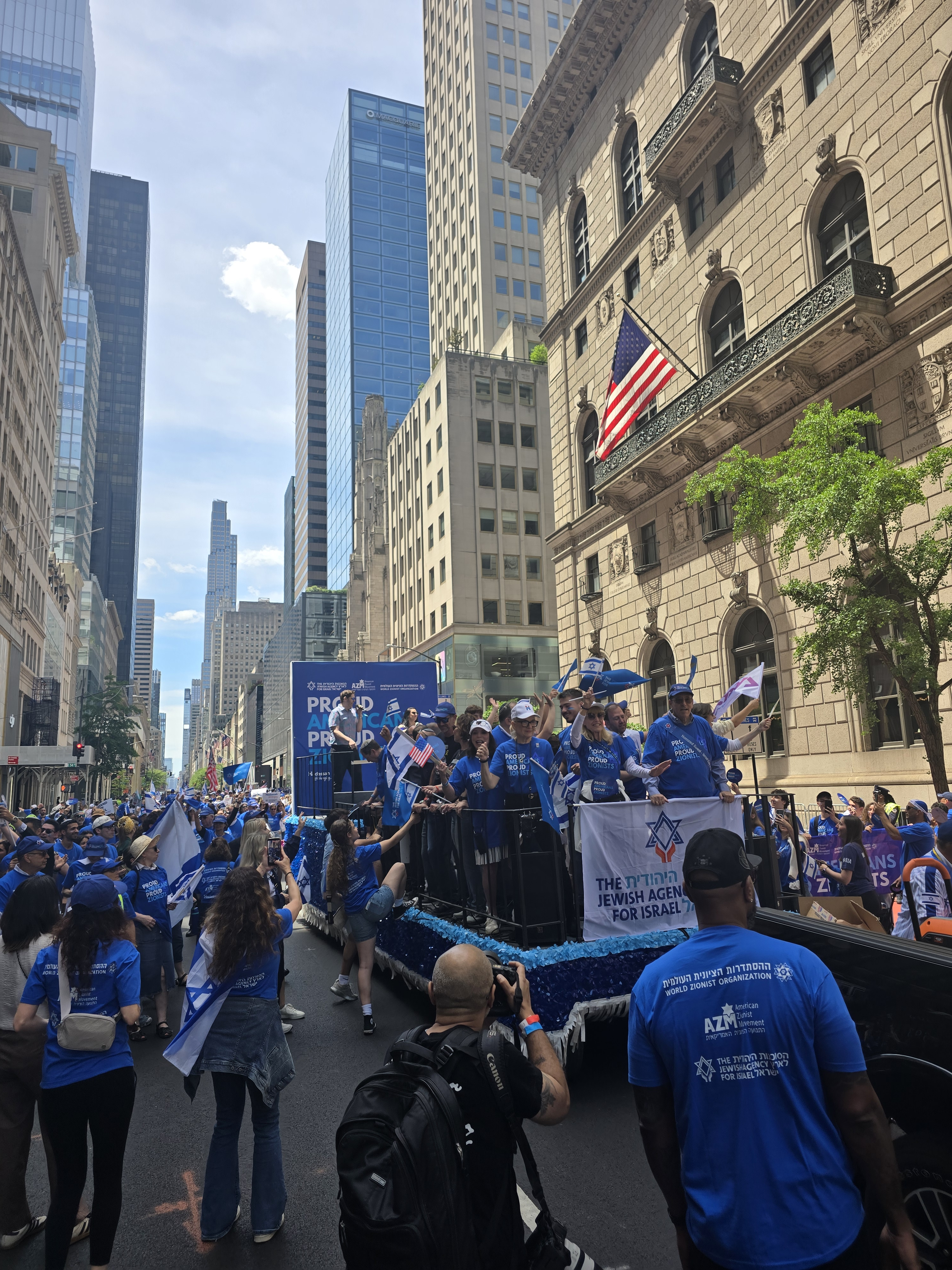
Jewish Agency truck in the Israel 2026 parade

In 1994, the Jewish Agency, together with the United Jewish Communities and Keren Hayesod-United Israel Appeal, established Partnership 2000. Now known as Partnership2Gether or P2G, the program connects 45 Israeli communities with over 500 Jewish communities around the globe in a "sister city"-style network. Diaspora participants travel to Israel and vice versa, and are hosted by their partner communities; schools are connected through the Global Twinning Network; global Jewish communities support loan funds helping entrepreneurs and small business owners in their partner cities; and young Jewish adults in Israel on long-term programs meet with their Israeli peers for dialogue and workshops.

The Jewish Agency provides Jewish communities outside Israel a continuum of programming to "bring Israel" to local worldwide Jewish communities. They do this in part through "shlichim," or emissaries. Shlichim are Israeli educators or cultural ambassadors, who spend an extended period of time (2 months to 5 years) abroad to "bring Israel" to the community. Shlichim are also posted at college campuses in organizations like Hillel or active in youth organizations.

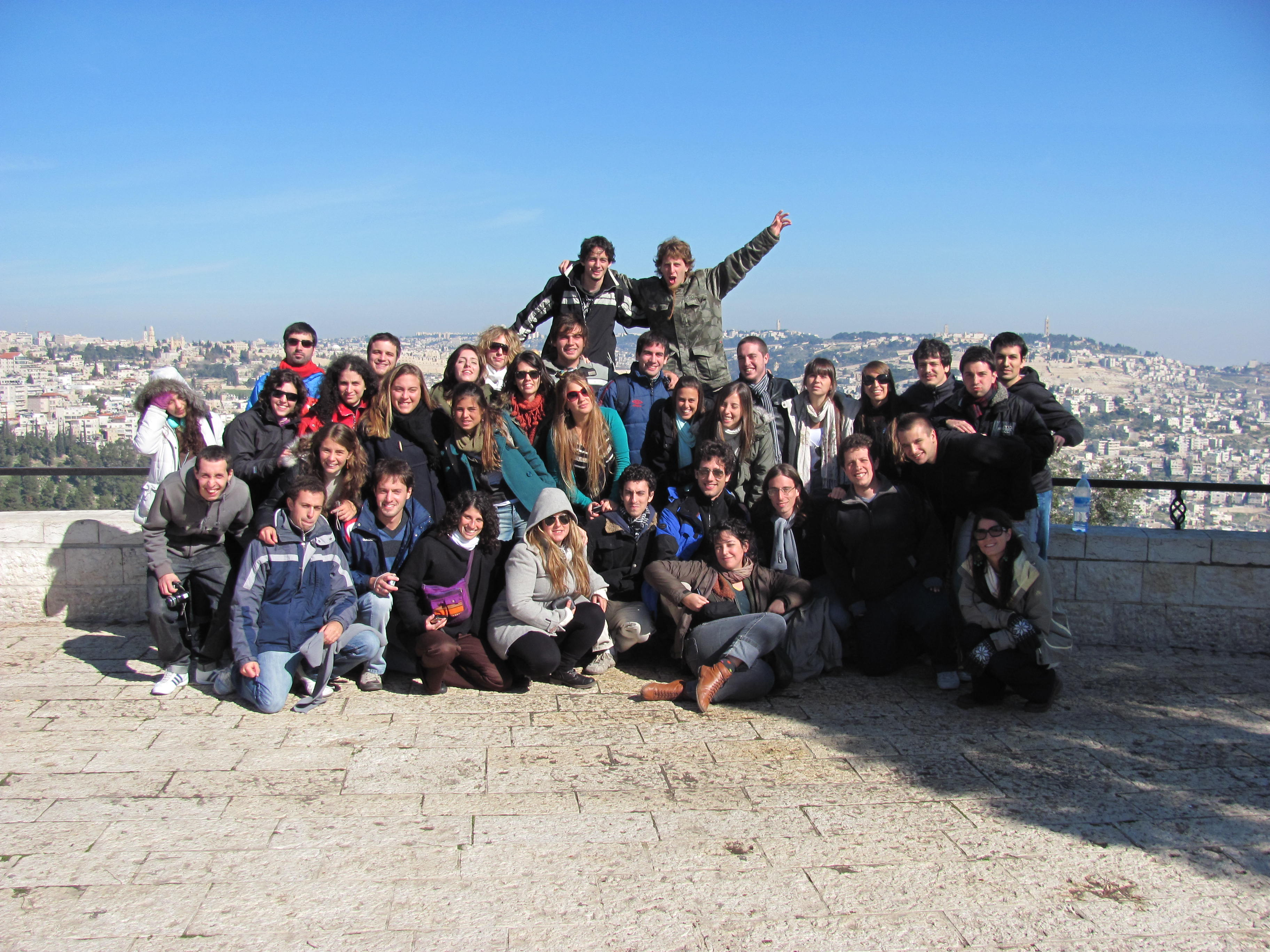
Participants on a Taglit-Birthright trip to Israel, 2012

Other Jewish Agency-sponsored programs that are instrumental in inspiring Jewish youth with a connection to Israel are "Israel Experiences" (educational visits to Israel) such as Taglit-Birthright Israel, a 10-day visit to Israel provided free-of-charge to young Jewish adults. The Jewish Agency is an important organizational partner in the Taglit-Birthright initiative.

In 2004, the Jewish Agency and the Government of Israel together created (and continue to co-sponsor as of 2016) Masa Israel Journey, which provides stipends to young Jews between the ages of 18 and 30 who would like to study, volunteer, or perform internships in Israel for a period of 5–12 months.

During this period, the Jewish Agency's Israel Department focused (and continues to focus) on strengthening Israel's periphery, namely the Galilee region in the north and the Negev in the South. The emergence of the high-tech industry in Israel created a significant socio-economic disparity between the center of country and the outer regions. Thus, the Jewish Agency sought (and continues to seek) to "lessen cultural and economic gaps."

For example, its Youth Futures program, founded in 2006, includes a holistic approach to dealing with at-risk youth in Israel: each child, referred to the program by a teacher or social worker, is connected to a "Mentor" who is responsible for connecting the child to resources and community services. The Jewish Agency is also a significant partner in the Net@ program offered by Cisco Systems. Program participants are Israeli high school students in socio-economically disadvantaged areas, who study the Cisco computer curriculum and earn certification as computer technicians; they also engage in volunteering and study democratic values.

In July 2022, during the Russian invasion of Ukraine, the Russian Ministry of Justice took steps to stop the Jewish Agency for Israel from operating in Russia, claiming that the agency had broken Russian law regarding collecting, storing and transferring data. After the invasion started, there was a sharp increase in emigration from Russia to Israel.

== Governance ==
The Jewish Agency Executive is charged with administering the operations of the Jewish Agency, subject to the control of the board of governors. It has 26 members, of which 24 are chosen by the board of governors. The executive is composed in the following manner: 12 members designated by WZO and 12 members designated jointly by JFNA/UIA and Keren Hayesod. In addition, the World chairperson of Keren Hayesod and the chairperson of the JFNA Executive are ex-officio members in the executive. Doron Almog is the current chair. Yaakov Hagoel was serving as acting chairman since Isaac Herzog vacated the position upon becoming Israel's 11th president.

Over the years the executive board has included many prominent members of Israeli society. Some of the famous Israelis who have served on the board include: M. D. Eder – 1922; Frederick Kisch – 1922–31; Haim Arlosoroff – 1931–33; Moshe Shertok – 1933–48; Arthur Ruppin – 1933–35; David Ben-Gurion (Chairman of the Executive) – 1935–48.

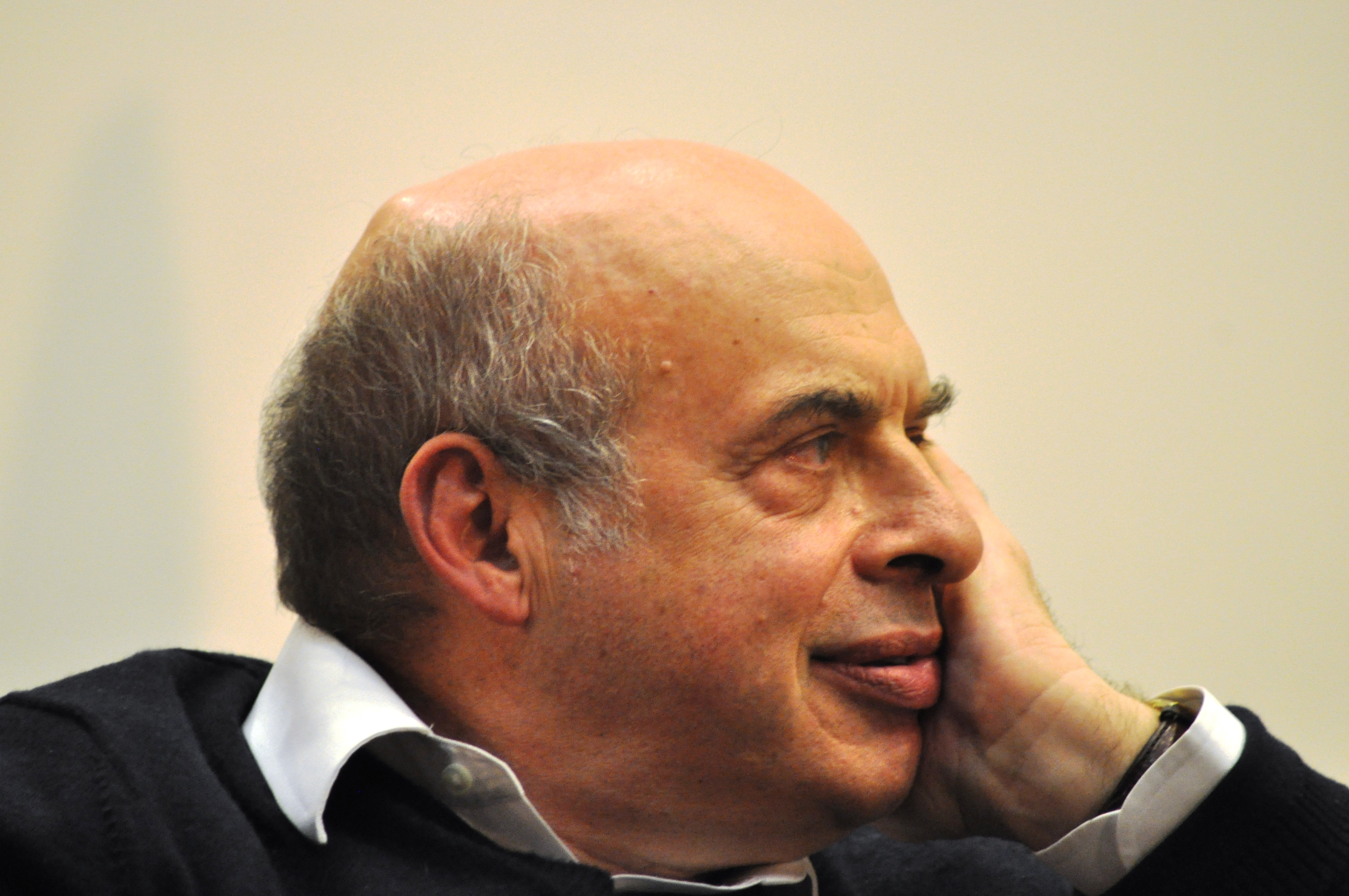
Natan Sharansky, former Chairman of the Executive of the Jewish Agency for Israel, in 2016

Past Chairmen of the Executive

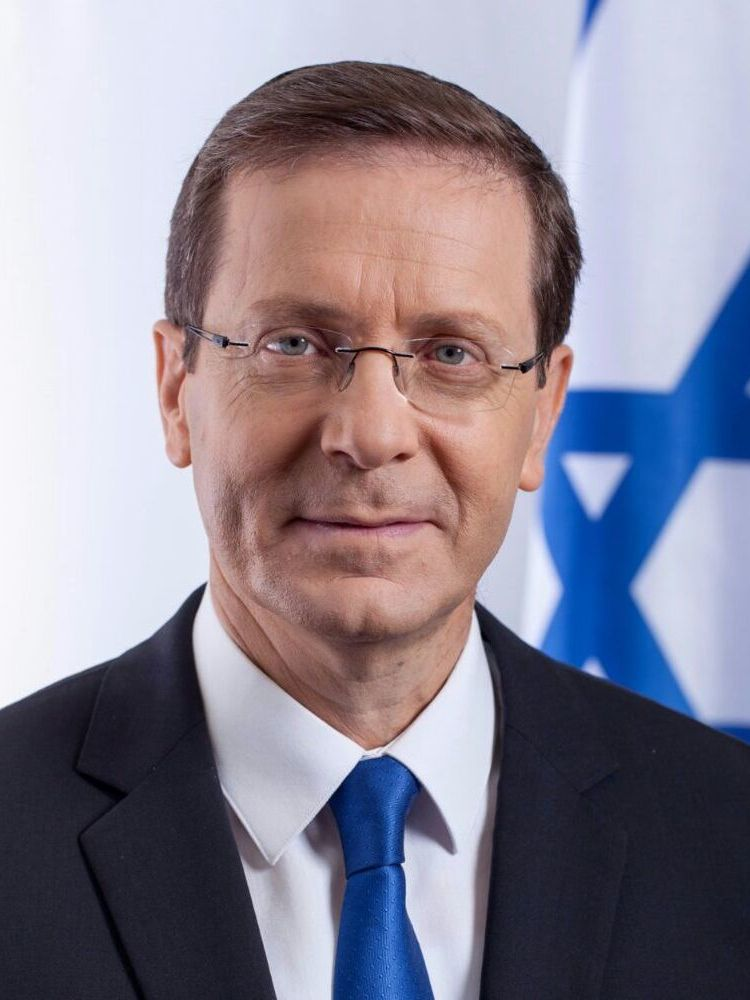
Isaac Herzog, former Chairman of the Executive of the Jewish Agency for Israel

- Frederick Hermann Kisch – 1923–1931
- Haim Arlosoroff – 1931–1933
- Arthur Ruppin – 1933–1935
- David Ben-Gurion – 1935–1948
- Berl Locker – 1948–1956
- Zalman Shazar – 1956–1961
- Moshe Sharett – 1961–1965
- Louis Arie Pincus – 1965–1974
- Pinhas Sapir – 1974–1975
- Yosef Almogi – 1976–1978
- Arieh Dulzin – 1974, 1978–1987
- Simha Dinitz – 1987–1994
- Avraham Burg – 1995–1999
- Sallai Meridor – 1999–2005
- Ze'ev Bielski – 2005–2009
- Natan Sharansky – 2009–2018
- Isaac Herzog – 2018–2021
- Yaakov Hagoel (acting) – 2021–2022
- Doron Almog – 2022–present

The board of governors, which meets not less than three times a year, is the central policy-making body of the Jewish Agency. The 120 governors play a crucial role in the governance of the agency in overseeing budgets and operations and in recommending policy to the agency. Members of the board are elected to serve for a two-year term in the following manner: 60 of the members (50 percent) are designated by WZO; 36 of the members (30 percent) are designated by JFNA/UIA; 24 members (20 percent) are designated by Keren Hayesod. The board of governors determines policy of the Jewish Agency for Israel and manages, supervises, controls, and directs its operations and activities.

Chairpersons of the Board of Governors
No.	Name	Term start	Term end
1	Max Fisher	1971	1983
2	Jerold Hoffberger	1983	1987
3	Mendel Kaplan	1987	1995
4	Charles Goodman	1995	1999
5	Alex Grass	1999	2003
6	Carole Solomon	2003	2007
7	Richard L. Pearlstone	2007	2011
8	James S. Tisch	2011	2014
9	Charles Horowitz Ratner	2014	2017
10	Michael Siegal	2017	2022
11	Mark Wilf	2022	2026
12	J. David Heller	2026	Incumbent

The Assembly, which meets at least once every two years, is the supreme governing body of the Jewish Agency. It has 518 delegates who are elected in the following manner: 259 of the members (50 percent) are designated by the WZO; 155 of the members (30 percent) are designated by the Jewish Federations of North America/United Israel Appeal (JFNA/UIA); and 104 of the members (20 percent) are designated by Keren Hayesod. The Assembly is responsible for determining basic policies and goals of the Jewish Agency; receiving and reviewing reports from the board of governors; making recommendations on major issues; and adopting resolutions on the above.

The director general is responsible, under the direction of the chairperson of the executive, for the implementation of policies established by the assembly, the board of governors and the executive. The director general is responsible for all operations and administration of the Jewish Agency, including implementation of long-term strategic goals.

== Funding and budget ==
The Jewish Agency is funded by the Jewish Federations of North America, Keren Hayesod, major Jewish communities and federations, and foundations and donors from Israel and around the world.

Due to the volatile U.S. dollar, the global economic crisis and the Madoff scandal, the Jewish Agency for Israel was forced to make significant cuts to its budget. The board of governors voted to cut $45 million in November 2008 and an additional $26 million at the February 2009 meeting.

The organization's total operating budget in 2013 was US$355,833,000, and its projected operating budget for 2014 was US$369,206,000. Its operating budget for 2019 is US$379,807,000.

Jewish Agency International Development, the organization's main fundraising arm in North America, is a registered 501(c)(3) organization.

=== Youth connections ===
==== Israel experiences ====
The Israel Experience programs bring young Jews from around the globe to Israel to get to know the country and deepen their Jewish identities.

- Taglit-Birthright Israel provides ten-day educational trips to Israel, Jerusalem and the Golan Heights for Jews ages 18 to 26 from around the world, completely free of charge. The Jewish Agency is the largest organizational partner in the initiative and is directly involved in bringing thousands of participants on Taglit-Birthright each year, with a special focus on facilitating Taglit-Birthright experiences for participants from the United States and from the former Soviet Union (FSU).
- Masa Israel Journey is a public-service organization founded in 2004 by the Government of Israel's Office of the Prime Minister, together with the Jewish Agency. It includes programs in Israel for Jews aged 18–30, including study programs, service programs, and career development. Programs last from 2–12 months. In 2018 it provided scholarships to nearly 9,800 participants. Masa also performs outreach and operates alumni activities.
- Israel Tech Challenge is a partnership of the Jewish Agency with the National Cyber Bureau and other partners and donors. It offers trips to Israel of varying lengths for students and young professionals (aged 18–30) with knowledge in the field of computer science and programming. The programs offer visits with Israeli hi-tech professionals and academics, along with experience or training in coding, cyber security and/or data science.
- Machon Le Madrichim trains Jewish counselors from Zionist youth movements around the world in Israel, to give them tools for running educational Zionist programs in their home communities when they return. It was founded in 1946 by the World Zionist Organization. As of 2018, it had 17,000 alumni from around the world. Today the Machon trains several hundred young leaders each year.
- Na'ale allows Jewish teenagers from the diaspora to study in Israel and earn a high school diploma. Students start the program in ninth or tenth grade and graduate after the twelfth grade with a full Israeli matriculation certificate (bagrut). During the first year, students follow an intensive Hebrew-language program so that they become able to speak, read and write in Hebrew. The program is fully subsidized by the Israeli government. The Na'ale scholarship includes: fully subsidized tuition, free ticket to Israel, room and board, health insurance, trips, and extra curricular activities. Na'ale offers a variety of schools all over Israel from which candidates may choose, including secular, national religious, ultra-orthodox, kibbutz, and urban boarding schools. The Jewish Agency is involved in recruitment in the former Soviet Union.
- "Students before Parents" ("סטודנטים לפני הורים", abbreviated as סל״ה, SELA, Selah), a program for young immigrants from the countries of the former Soviet Union aimed at the preparation to the education in Israel, bringing young Jews to Israel in hopes that their families follow them. The program includes learning Hebrew, English, mathematics, and Jewish history and tradition.

==== Jewish and Zionist education outside Israel ====
In its mission to strengthen the ties between Israel and worldwide Jewry and to promote Jewish culture and identity, the Jewish Agency sends out shlichim, or emissaries, to Jewish communities across the globe; partners with Israel and Diaspora communities, and operates and/or funds Jewish educational programs. It also supports Jewish inclusion and diversity programs.

- Jewish Agency Israel Fellows are Israeli young adults who have completed army service and university study. These "Campus Shlichim" travel for two years university campuses with the goal of empowering student leadership and promoting positive engagement with Israel. According to the Jewish Agency, the aims of an Israel Fellow are to "create an ongoing Israel presence for Jewish students and the broader community . . . . partner with student organizations, campus study abroad offices, Jewish and Israel studies departments, local Jewish federations, Israeli consulates, and Jewish Community Centers ... [and] follow through with Taglit-Birthright trip alumni via one-on-one meetings and special programs and events to keep them active and encourage them to continue their Jewish journeys while in college."
- Shlichim (Jewish Agency "emissaries") are active in communal organizations, Jewish schools, community centers, synagogues and youth movements. There are also summer Shlichim who serve in Jewish summer camps. They serve as a central resource for Israel education in the local community. In the 2017–18 program year, the Jewish Agency sent 1,388 short-term emissaries to summer camps and other programs, and around 400 long-term emissaries to countries around the world (not including the Israel Fellows).
- Programs for Russian-speaking Jewry: The organization has developed special outreach to Russian Jewry, because they have largely been separated from Jewish communities even after the fall of the Soviet Union. Only an estimated 20 percent of the 800,000 Jews across former Soviet states are engaged in Jewish life. And Russian Jews who have emigrated to other countries have often been separated from Jewish community life. The agency runs programs for them (in the former Soviet Union, Germany, Austria and Israel) that fall are organized into four areas: (1) Camping, youth education, and counselor training (2) leadership training (3) visits to Israel (4) Focus on facilitation of Aliyah from the former Soviet Union and Germany.
- FSU Summer and Winter Camps introduce young Russian-speaking Jews in the former Soviet Union to their Jewish heritage. Staffed by trained local counselors and Russian-speaking Israeli counselors, participants are introduced to Jewish history, Jewish customs and practices, and Israel. The agency organizes counselors to follow up with attendees in year-round Jewish educational activities. In 2018, some 8,200 participants in the former Soviet Union attended sleepaway camps and 1,487 went to day camps.
- Partnership2Gether and the Global School Twinning Network: see below.
- The Emergency Assistance Fund provides for physical security improvements, such as video surveillance & CCTV, alarms, locks, gates, and reinforced walls/doors/windows, at synagogues, Jewish community centers, schools, and camps so that Jewish communal life can continue in greater safety. Jewish institutions outside Israel and North America are eligible for assistance. The 2018 allocations totaled around $1.4 million: $781,000 to institutions in Europe, $423,000 to facilities in Latin America, $82,000 to those in the former Soviet Union, and $109,000 to the Middle East. As of the end of 2018, the fund has allocated over $11.5 million to hundreds of institutions in dozens of countries.

=== Aliyah ===
The Jewish Agency still brings thousands of Jews to move to Israel each year. In 2014, The agency helped a total of nearly 26,500 olim (immigrants) make Aliyah, the highest number in 13 years. They noted significant growth in immigration from Ukraine and France. The agency continues to support these olim as they integrate into Israeli society.

- Aliyah of Rescue is the Jewish Agency's Aliyah infrastructure that brings Jews suffering persecution or economic distress to Israel. The services include covert operations to help Jews move out of Middle Eastern and North African countries with which Israel does not have diplomatic relations.
- Pre-Aliyah Services are provided by the Jewish Agency to prospective immigrants around the world. Agency shlichim, or emissaries, give guidance on issues such as education, housing, health and employment opportunities in Israel. For those who do not have an emissary nearby, The agency provides assistance online and on the phone through its Global Service Center. Additionally, The agency is responsible for verifying that each potential immigrant is eligible for Aliyah under Israel's Law of Return and, once eligibility is proven, for facilitating the receipt of the Aliyah visa via the local Israeli embassy or consulate.
- Absorption Centers around the country offer temporary housing for new immigrants and provide space for Hebrew instruction, preparation for life and employment in Israel, events, activities and cultural presentations. 17 of The agency's 22 Absorption Centers cater specifically to Ethiopian olim and provide services tailored to the needs of the Ethiopian community. The other five house immigrants from around the world, primarily the FSU, South America, and the Middle East.
- Ulpan: Intensive Hebrew language programs for new immigrants include five hours of immersive language instruction, five days a week, for five months. The programs are offered free of charge to all new immigrants. Ulpan instructors are certified by the Ministry of Education.
- Centers for Young Adults provide ulpan classes, accommodations and a range of services to ease absorption for olim ages 18–35. These centers include the Ulpan Etzion network for college graduates and young professionals; Beit Brodetzky in Tel Aviv and Ulpan Kinneret in Tiberias, for high school graduates looking for job or army preparation; and Kibbutz Ulpan, combining Hebrew instruction with volunteer work on ten different kibbutzim. It also includes Selah, a program for high school graduates from the Former Soviet Union, and TAKA, which combines ulpan studies with pre-academic preparatory courses for immigrants headed to Israeli colleges who wish to polish their skills.
- Wings encompasses an array of services including practical guidance and personal mentorship for young immigrants who join the IDF as lone soldiers, far from their families.

=== Supporting vulnerable populations in Israel ===
The Jewish Agency also helps vulnerable populations in Israel and around the world.

- Youth Futures is a community-based initiative for mentoring at-risk pre-teens and adolescents. Each Youth Futures "mentor" works with 16 at-risk children over the course of three years, teaching skills for academic improvement and social integration. In 2014–15, approximately 350 trained Youth Futures staff members worked with 5,000 children and teens, plus 7,000 of their family members, in 200 schools in 35 communities in Israel. In addition to secular and traditional Jews, Youth Futures serves Arab, Bedouin, Druze, and Ultra-Orthodox communities.
- Youth Villages provide safe, cost-effective boarding school settings for 850 young people ages 12 to 18 who have severe emotional, behavioral and family problems. The four Jewish Agency youth villages provide intensive, holistic services and help the youths succeed in and complete high school, and enter the Israeli army with their peers.
- Project TEN brings together young Israelis and their Jewish peers from across the globe to work on sustainable projects in developing regions. Participants spend three months working in onsite service projects in vulnerable communities. Project TEN is a service-learning program designed to build participants' Jewish identities while they serve others. In 2022, Project TEN runs volunteer centers in Winneba, Ghana; Oaxaca, Mexico; Gondar, Ethiopia; Kibbutz Harduf, Israel; and Mitzpe Ramon. In 2015 the program involved 200 volunteers around the world.
- Young Activism includes programs that train and support young-adult Israeli volunteers, who go on to create their own social entrepreneurship projects, thus widening the circles of influence. The Young Activism programs include (a) support for Young Communities, groups of idealistic young Israelis who commit to settling long-term in Israel's high-need areas and creating programs that increase local quality of life. (b) Choosing Tomorrow, which encourages university students in Israel's outlying areas to create young communities and settle long-term in the region (c) Ketzev, which provides extra training and mentoring to some of the young communities to help them build self-sustaining "social entrepreneurship" businesses, that provide cultural or educational benefits to customers. (d) Click, which provides microgrants to individual volunteers or very small groups, to help them launch small-scale local projects. (e) The Young Adults' Hub in Arad, where dozens of Israelis and Diaspora Jews receive subsidized housing in exchange for their volunteer activities for the city.
- Net@ gives high-performing teenagers an opportunity to rise above their families' socio-economic backgrounds by training them for four years in marketable computer skills, leading to certification as computer and network technicians through Cisco Systems. The program is in addition to the participants' high school course load and also increases their English comprehension skills. In 2014, around 1,100 teens participated in the program, and another 400 children participated in Net@ Junior.
- Loan funds assist entrepreneurs and business owners in Israel to open or expand their businesses, through loans with highly attractive conditions as well as comprehensive business guidance. The Jewish Agency acts as a partial guarantor for the loans, to support those businesses that otherwise would have a difficult time qualifying for loans or presenting the necessary collateral for them. The various funds have different eligibility criteria, with some focusing on stimulating the economy in specific regions of Israel, and others focusing on specific populations of business owners, such as Israeli Arabs, Ethiopian-Israelis, immigrants, etc.
- The Fund for Victims of Terror provides two forms of financial assistance to those who have been wounded, or had family members killed, in a terrorist attack or war against Israel. It provides immediate assistance in the 24–48 hours after the attack, and it provides subsidies for long-term rehabilitation needs. In 2014, the fund provided emergency grants to 120 families impacted by Operation Protective Edge, and more than 1 million shekels (around $250,000 according to the exchange rate at the time) to 80 families with long-term effects from Operation Pillar of Defense.
- Amigour is a Jewish Agency subsidiary that provides housing for Israel's elderly. In 2014 it operated 57 facilities that housed 7,500 seniors, mainly Holocaust survivors. Additionally, it operates 13,000 public housing apartments that provide government-subsidized housing to 40,000 single-parent families, elderly, and new immigrants.

== Services for Israeli Arabs and minorities ==
As part of its efforts to strengthen Israeli society and to support vulnerable populations in Israel, the Jewish Agency has, for many years, supported or operated programs that encourage co-existence between Israeli Jews and Israeli Arabs, and programs designed specifically to serve Israel's non-Jewish citizens, and they continue to create new ones. Some of the programs:

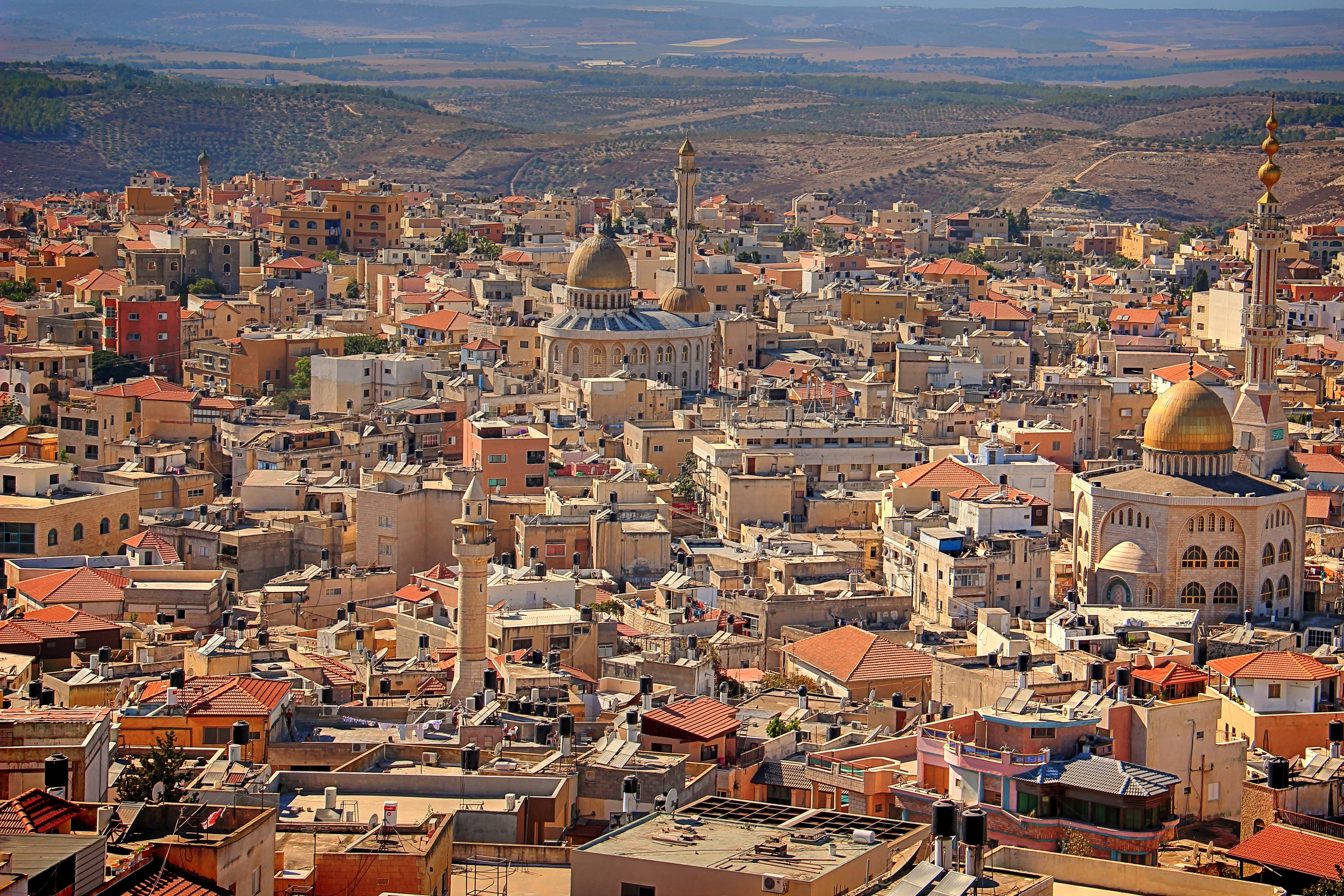
The Arab city of Umm al-Fahm in northern Israel

- Youth Futures, the mentorship program for middle-school students, is active in 36 locations around Israel. Some localities served by Youth Futures are Jewish, while others are mixed and, in recent years, the Jewish Agency has begun to serve children and families living in completely non-Jewish locales: East Jerusalem (100% Arab participants), Tel Aviv-Yafo (32% of participants are Arab), Acco and Matte Asher (34%), Lod (57% Arab/Bedouin), Horfeish (100% Druze), and El Kassum (100% Bedouin).
- Choosing Tomorrow, one of The agency's "Young Activism" social entrepreneurship training programs, includes three groups of Arab university and college students (total 40 students) who are being trained to create their own social-welfare programs that will specifically benefit their local (Arab) communities. These groups are in Be'er Sheva, the Jezre'el Valley, and a group at the Alkassemy Arab College. Additionally, Choosing Tomorrow groups in the Negev work to improve medical services to the Bedouin population, by teaching Arabic to local doctors and helping them understand and connect with Bedouin culture.
- Neve Midbar is a boarding school that develops leadership among teenage Bedouin boys.
- Net@ is a program supported by the Jewish Agency. In its chapters in Ramle, Nazareth, Acre, Jerusalem, and Tel Aviv-Yafo, Jewish and Arab teenagers study computers together, volunteer in community computer labs together, and serve as mentors together to junior-high school participants. In addition, Net@ has all-Arab chapters in Umm Al Fahm, Yirka, and Tira. 25% of all counselors in Net@ are Israeli Arab.

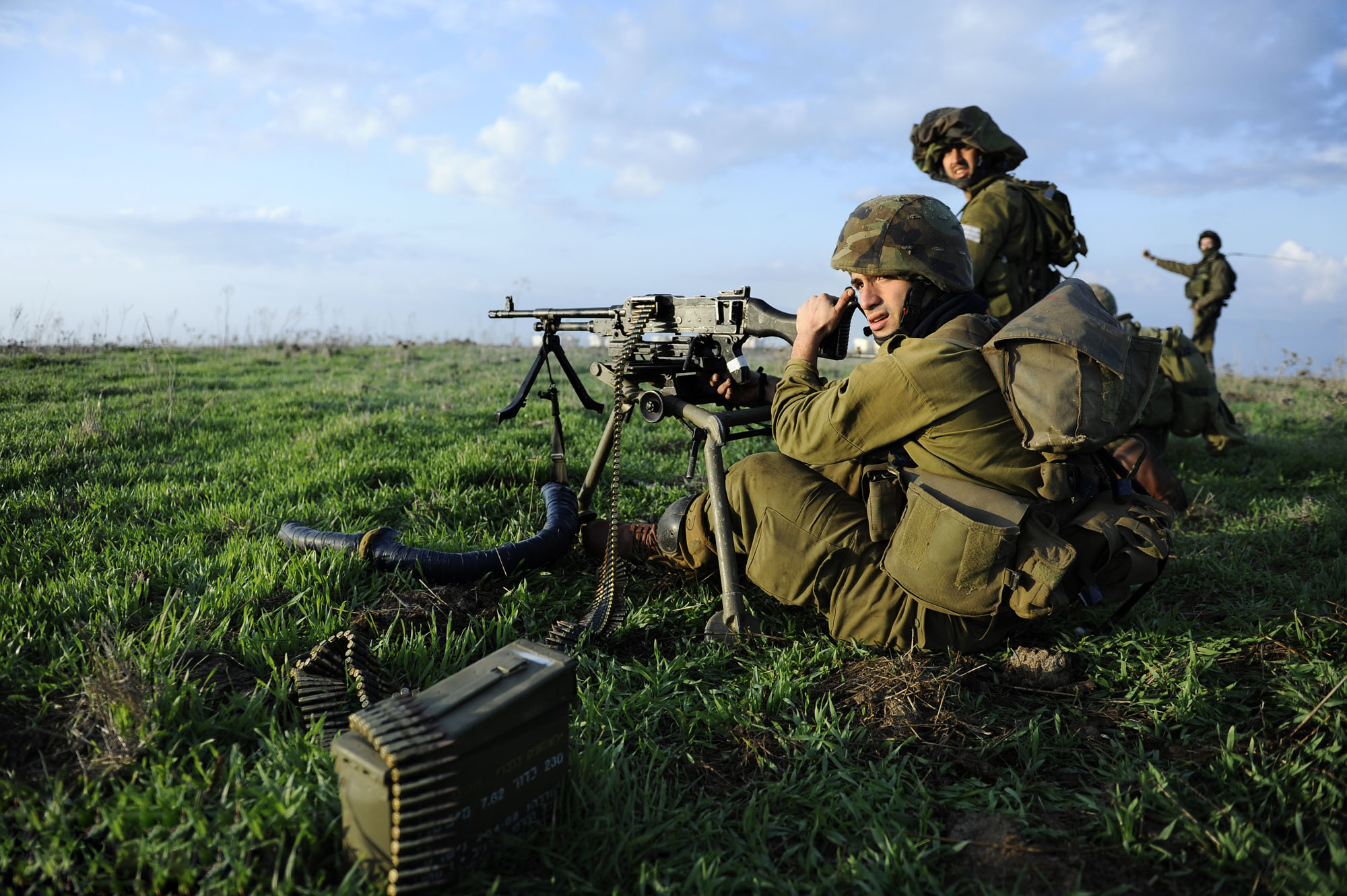
Druze Israeli soldiers of the Herev Battalion, also known as the IDF Minorities Unit

- Acharai Pre-Army Academy (Mechinah) includes a mixed Jewish-Druze group and a mixed Jewish-Christian group in which soon-to-be-enlisted young Israelis of both religions work together to volunteer, promote co-existence, and prepare for their IDF service.
- Atidim is a national Israeli program provides scholarships and educational activities to gifted students, funded in part by the Jewish Agency. Most programs serve both Jewish and non-Jewish students, and there are some programs dedicated specifically to the Arab sector. All told, in 2014 Atidim programs included more than 2,340 non-Jewish participants, including Druze, Bedouin, Arabs and other non-Jewish Israelis. Additionally the alumni association includes hundreds of Arab, Druze, and Bedouin graduates.
- Jewish Agency scholarship funds benefit Arab recipients as well as Jewish ones.
- Jewish Agency loan funds often help Israeli-Arab small business owners to receive bank loans at favorable rates. The nine different funds act as guarantors. One of the funds specifically aims to assist small business owners who are Arab, ultra-Orthodox, female, Ethiopian, or immigrants.

== Strategic plans ==
At the February 2010 board of governors meeting, Natan Sharansky announced a shift in the priorities of the Jewish Agency from Aliyah to strengthening Jewish identity for young adults around the world.

From 1948 until 2009, the Jewish Agency was organized into departments: the Aliyah and Absorption department, which was responsible for the immigration and integration of Jews coming to Israel; the Education department, which worked to deepen the connection of Jews worldwide to Israel; and the Israel department, which focused on improving the lives of socio-economically vulnerable Israelis. (A fourth department, for Agriculture and Settlement, had been in operation starting in 1948, but had closed long before 2009.)

In order to increase efficiency, the Jewish Agency, under the leadership of its new chairman of the executive, Natan Sharansky, decided to restructure the organization. Along with the organizational restructuring came a new focus. As the first decade of the 21st century came to a close, The agency noted that most of global Jewry was now located in democratic, stable societies that were relatively friendly to Jewish residents. As "Aliyah of Rescue" became urgent for decreasing numbers of Jews, new challenges were arising for world Jewry, most notably, Agency leaders remarked, the need to engage young Jews in Jewish culture and to help Israeli Jews and those who live outside Israel to understand each other and feel connected to what they call the "global Jewish family." While continuing "Aliyah of Rescue" operations, The agency decided to focus its primary energies on fostering a strong relationship between world Jewry and Israel, and on encouraging Aliyah based on a love for the country, what it calls "Aliyah of Choice." Its main vehicle for doing so would be to bring Jews from around the world to Israel on short- and long-term tourist programs to allow them to get to know the country and to give Israelis the opportunity to get to know them and vice versa. Parallel to these efforts, The agency decided to increase its investment in strengthening Jewish communities around the globe. Its goals would be to grow local Jewish leadership, to strengthen Jewish identity, and to deepen the connection of communities worldwide to Israel and to the Jewish people as a whole.

== Awards and recognition ==
On May 8, 2008, at the Israeli government's 60th Independence Day celebration, the Jewish Agency for Israel was awarded the Israel Prize for lifetime achievement & special contribution to society and the State of Israel.

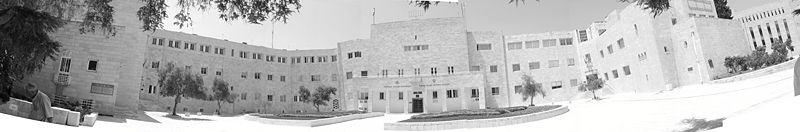
Jewish Agency headquarters in Jerusalem

== See also ==
- List of Israel Prize recipients
- Nefesh B'Nefesh
