= Louis Arie Pincus =

Israeli politician (1912–1973)

- לואי אריה פינקוס
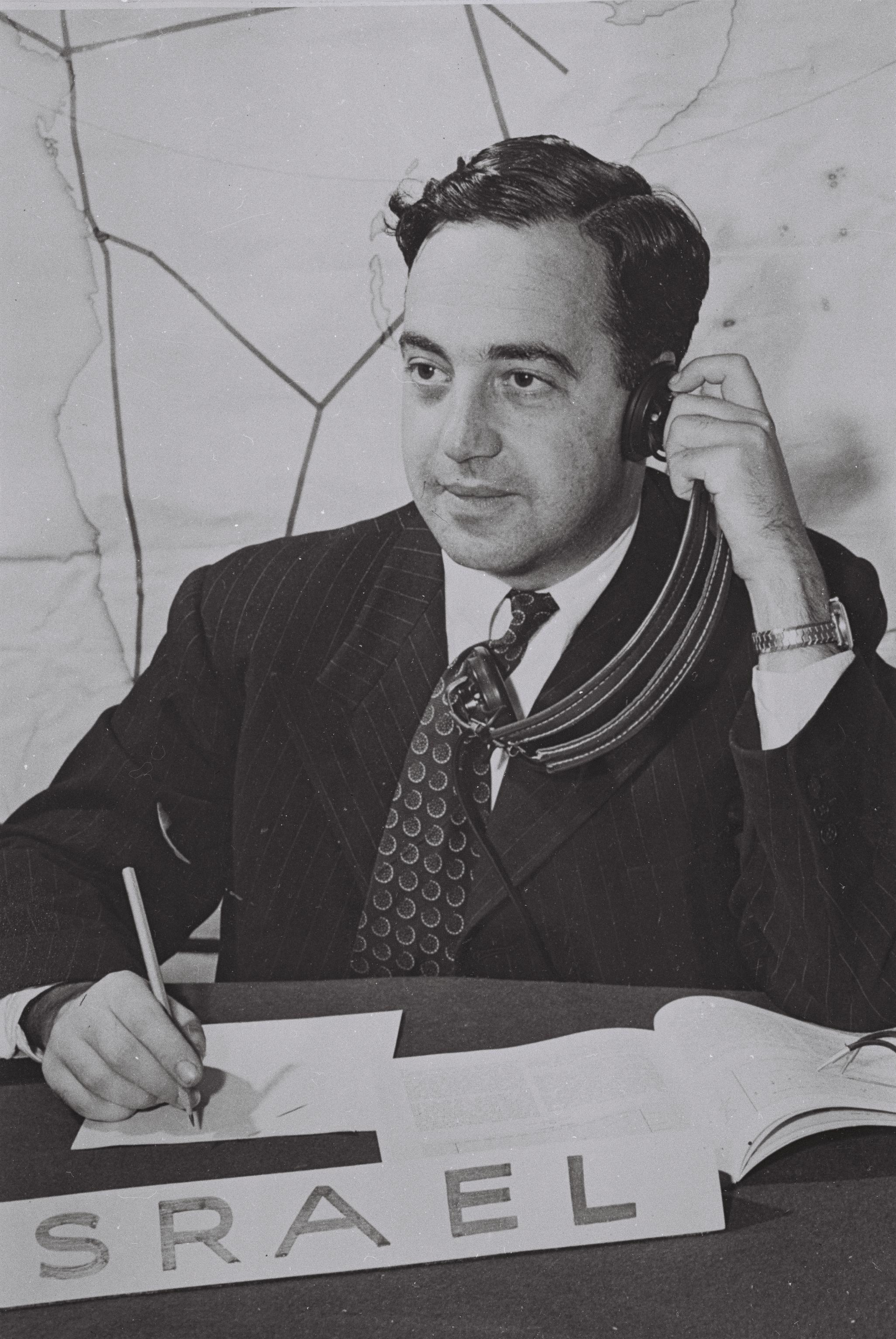
- Pincus in 1949

Chairman of the World Zionist Organization
- In office 1972–1973
- Preceded by: Ehud Avriel
- Succeeded by: Aryeh Dolchin

Personal details
- Born: 21 May 1912 Orange Free State
- Died: 26 July 1973 (aged 61)

Louis Arie Pincus (Hebrew: לואי אריה פינקוס May 21, 1912 – July 26, 1973) was an Israeli Zionist leader.

== Early life ==
Louis Arie Pincus was born in the Orange Free State in 1912. Pincus studied law at the University of the Witwatersrand in Johannesburg, graduating in 1934.

== World Zionist Organization ==
Pincus served as Chairman of the World Zionist Organization from 1972 to 1973.

== Death ==
He died on July 26, 1973, aged 61.
