= 2029 in public domain =

When a work's copyright expires, it enters the public domain. Since laws vary globally, the copyright status of some works is not uniform. The following is a list of creators whose works enter the public domain in 2029.

== Entering the public domain in countries with life + 70 years ==
Except for Belarus (Life + 50 years) and Spain (which has a copyright term of Life + 80 years for creators that died before 1988), a work enters the public domain in Europe 70 years after the creator's death, if it was published during the creator's lifetime. In addition, several other countries have a limit of 70 years. The list is sorted alphabetically and includes a notable work of the creator.

Names	Country	Death	Occupation	Notable work
Eleanor Hallowell Abbott	United States	4 June 1958	novelist, poet, short story writer	Molly Make-Believe, But Once A Year: Christmas Stories
Giacomo Balla	Italy	1 March 1958	Painter and poet	Works
Johannes R. Becher	Germany	11 October 1958	politician, novelist, and poet	Auferstanden aus Ruinen
James Branch Cabell	United States	5 May 1958	fantasy writer	Jurgen, A Comedy of Justice, Biography of the Life of Manuel
Virginia Brindis de Salas	Uruguay	6 April 1958	Poet	Pregón de Marimorena
Francis Carco	France	26 May 1958	Author	Works
Maurice Caullery	France	13 July 1958	Biologist	Selected writings
Charles Cestre	France	18 November 1958	Academic	Works
Harry Cohn	United States	27 February 1958	Filmmaker	
Pierre-Antoine Cousteau	France	17 December 1958	Journalist	Publications
René Dussaud	France	17 March 1958	Archaeologist, Epigrapher	Bibliography
E. Everett Evans	United States	2 December 1958	Science fiction author	
Margiad Evans	United Kingdom	17 March 1958	illustrator, novelist, poet	Country Dance, Autobiography, A Ray of Darkness, The Nightingale Silenced
Dorothy Canfield Fisher	United States	9 November 1958	literary critic, memoirist, novelist, short story writer, translator	Understood Betsy
Marjorie Flack	United States	29 August 1958	children's writer, illustrator	writer of The Story About Ping, illustrator of The Country Bunny and the Little Gold Shoes
Lion Feuchtwanger	Germany	21 December 1958	writer, journalist, novelist and playwright	author of Jud Süß (Süss, the Jew)
Angelina Weld Grimké	United States	10 June 1958	playwright, poet	Rachel
Myriam Harry	France	10 March 1958	Writer	Publications
Paul Henry	Ireland	24 August 1958	Painter	The Great Blasket Islands, Evening on Killary Bay
Juan Ramón Jiménez	Spain	29 May 1958	Poet	
Frédéric Joliot-Curie	France	14 August 1958	Chemist	
Michael Joseph	United Kingdom	15 March 1958	Writer, publisher	How to Write Serial Fiction, Puss in Books: A collection of stories about cats, The Sword in the Scabbard
Henri de Kérillis	France	11 April 1958	Writer	Books
Maxim Kopf	Austria-Hungary; Czechoslovakia; United States	6 July 1958	Painter, graphic artist and sculptor	paintings from Tahiti and the Marquesas Islands
Cyril M. Kornbluth	United States	21 March 1958	science fiction writer	The Little Black Bag, The Marching Morons
Henry Kuttner	United States	3 February 1958	Writer of fantasy, horror fiction, and science fiction.	The Graveyard Rats, Mimsy Were the Borogoves
Charles Kvapil	Belgium	21 December 1958	Painter	
Stéphane Lauzanne	France	22 November 1958	Journalist	Works
Georges Lecomte	France	27 August 1958	Playwright	Works
Johnston McCulley	United States	23 November 1958	Writer	Works
Dorothy Macardle	Ireland	23 December 1958	Historian	The Irish Republic
Rose Macaulay	United Kingdom	30 October 1958	biographer, novelist, travel writer	The World My Wilderness, The Towers of Trebizond
Roger Martin du Gard	France	22 August 1958	Novelist	Works
Ismail Marzuki	Indonesia	15 May 1958	composer, songwriter	Gugur Bunga, Halo, Halo Bandung, Indonesia Pusaka
Johnston McCulley	United States	23 November 1958	Author	Zorro
G. E. Moore	United Kingdom	24 October 1958	journal editor, philosopher	Principia Ethica, A Defence of Common Sense
Charles Langbridge Morgan	United Kingdom	6 February 1958	novelist, playwright	The Burning Glass
Marlow Moss	United Kingdom	23 August 1958	Painter	
Alfred Noyes	United Kingdom	25 June 1958	playwright, poet, short story writer	The Highwayman, Shakespeare's Kingdom
Seumas O'Sullivan	Ireland	24 March 1958	magazine editor, poet	Twilight People, Verses Sacred and Profane
Elliot Paul	United States	7 April 1958	journalist, novelist, screenwriter	Life and Death of a Spanish Town, Linden on the Saugus Branch
Enrico Pea	Italy	11 August 1958	Writer	Works
H. G. Peter	United States	2 January 1958	Cartoonist	Wonder Woman
Nicolae Petrescu-Comnen	Romania	8 December 1958	social scientist	Accidente profesionale (Work-related Accidents), Câteva considerațiuni asupra socialismului și asupra roadelor sale (Some Musings on Socialism and Its Results)
Lennox Robinson	Ireland	15 October 1958	Playwright	The Clancy Name, Drama at Inish
Rudolph Rocker	Germany; United Kingdom; United States	19 September 1958	anarchist publisher and activist	Nationalism and Culture
Peig Sayers	Ireland	8 December 1958	seanchaí (traditional Gaelic storyteller and historian)	Peig, Machnamh Seanmhná (An Old Woman's Reflections)
Robert W. Service	Canada	11 September 1958	poet	The Shooting of Dan McGrew, The Cremation of Sam McGee
J. C. Squire	United Kingdom	20 December 1958	historian, literary critic, magazine editor, poet	Robin Hood: a farcical romantic pastoral, Shakespeare as a Dramatist
John Reed Swanton	United States	2 May 1958	anthropologist, folklorist, linguist	The Indian Tribes of North America, Emanuel Swedenborg, Prophet of the Higher Evolution
Pietro Paolo Trompeo	Italy	7 June 1958	Writer	Works
Ethel Turner	Australia	8 April 1958	children's writer, novelist	Seven Little Australians
Bart van der Leck	Netherlands	13 November 1958	Painter	
Ralph Vaughan Williams	United Kingdom	26 August 1958	Composer	A London Symphony
Geoffrey Willans	United Kingdom	6 August 1958	children's writer, humorist, novelist, screenwriter	Down with Skool! A Guide to School Life for Tiny Pupils and their Parents, Whizz for Atomms: A Guide to Survival in the 20th Century for Fellow Pupils, their Doting Maters, Pompous Paters and Any Others who are Interested
William Albert Ward (it)	United Kingdom	1958	Cartoonist	Donald Duck comics

== Countries with life + 60 years ==
In Bangladesh, India, and Venezuela a work enters the public domain 60 years after the creator's death.

Names	Country	Death	Occupation	Notable work
Peter Arno	United States	22 February 1968	Cartoonist	
Karl Barth	Switzerland	10 December 1968	Theologian	Church Dogmatics
Enid Blyton	United Kingdom	28 November 1968	Writer	The Famous Five, The Secret Seven, Noddy
Hugo Butler	United States	7 January 1968	Screenwriter	Lassie Come Home
Mario Castelnuovo-Tedesco	Italy	16 March 1968	Composer	Les Guitares bien tempérées
Juan José Castro	Argentina	3 September 1968	Composer	
Phra Chenduriyang	Thailand	25 December 1968	Composer	Thai National Anthem
Cho Chi-hun	South Korea	17 May 1968	Poet	
Randolph Churchill	United Kingdom	6 June 1968	Journalist, politician	Lord Derby: King of Lancashire
Carmelo de Arzadun	Uruguay	16 October 1968	Painter	
Kees van Dongen	Netherlands	28 May 1968	Painter	Woman with Large Hat
Carl Theodor Dreyer	Denmark	20 March 1968	Film Director	Michael
Marcel Duchamp	France	2 October 1968	Artist, writer	Nude Descending a Staircase, No. 2, Fountain
Margaret Duley	Canada	22 March 1968	Novelist	§Works
Edna Ferber	United States	15 April 1968	Novelist, playwright	So Big, Show Boat
Red Foley	United States	19 September 1968	Singer-songwriter	Old Shep
Lucio Fontana	Italy	7 September 1968	Painter, sculptor	
Ruth France	New Zealand	19 August 1968	Librarian, poet, novelist	The Race
George Gamow	Soviet Union; United States	19 August 1968	Physicist, Science writer	One Two Three... Infinity and Mr. Tompkins series
Alice Guy-Blaché	France	24 March 1968	Filmmaker, screenwriter	La Fée aux Choux
Otto Hahn	Germany	28 July 1968	Chemist	Applied Radiochemistry
John Heartfield	Germany	26 April 1968	Artist	
Fannie Hurst	United States	23 February 1968	Novelist	Imitation of Life, Lummox
Muhammad Taha al-Huwayzi	Iran; Iraq	4 April 1968	Religious teacher, poet	Tā'liqāt fī mustafīḍah al-fiqh wa-al-uṣūl
W. E. Johns	United Kingdom	21 June 1968	Writer, aviator	The Biggles series
Anna Kavan	United Kingdom	5 December 1968	Writer	Ice
Helen Keller	United States	1 June 1968	Author, activist	The Story of My Life
Robert F. Kennedy	United States	6 June 1968	Politician, lawyer, author	The Enemy Within
Martin Luther King Jr.	United States	4 April 1968	Civil rights leader, minister	Why We Can't Wait
Robert Z. Leonard	United States	27 August 1968	Film Director, screenwriter	The Great Ziegfeld
Albert Lewin	United States	9 May 1968	Director, screenwriter	The Picture of Dorian Gray
Trygve Lie	Norway	30 December 1968	Politician, author	In the Cause of Peace: Seven Years With The United Nations
Howard Lindsay	United States	11 February 1968	Playwright, librettist	State of the Union
Little Walter	United States	15 February 1968	Blues musician	Juke
Dorothea Mackellar	Australia	14 January 1968	Poet	My Country
Archie Mayo	United States	4 December 1968	Film director, actor	Night After Night
Ramón Menéndez Pidal	Spain	14 November 1968	Historian	La España del Cid
Thomas Merton	United States	10 December 1968	Monk, author	The Seven Storey Mountain
José Monegal	Uruguay	4 November 1968	Writer, journalist	Memorias de Juan Pedro Camargo
Wes Montgomery	United States	15 June 1968	Jazz guitarist	The Incredible Jazz Guitar of Wes Montgomery
Elsie K. Morton	New Zealand	21 August 1968	Journalist, writer	Along the Road: a book of New Zealand life and travel
Walter Nash	New Zealand	4 June 1968	Politician	New Zealand: a working democracy
Edwin O'Connor	United States	23 March 1968	Novelist, journalist	The Last Hurrah, The Edge of Sadness
Erwin Panofsky	United States	14 March 1968	Art Historian	Early Netherlandish Painting
Mervyn Peake	United Kingdom	17 November 1968	Writer	Gormenghast Trilogy
Salvatore Quasimodo	Italy	14 June 1968	Writer	Giorno dopo giorno
Herbert Read	United Kingdom	12 June 1968	Art Historian	To Hell With Culture
Conrad Richter	United States	30 October 1968	Novelist	The Town
Nelle Scanlan	New Zealand	5 October 1968	Novelist, journalist	The Pencarrow series
Upton Sinclair	United States	25 November 1968	Writer	The Jungle
John Steinbeck	United States	20 December 1968	Novelist	Of Mice and Men, The Grapes of Wrath
Tian Han	China	10 December 1968	Playwright	March of the Volunteers, Xie Yaohuan
Rose Wilder Lane	United States	30 October 1968	Writer, Political Theorist	The Discovery of Freedom
Clare Winger Harris	United States	October 1968	Writer	Away From the Here and Now
Justino Zavala Muniz	Uruguay	23 March 1968	Writer, playwright, historian, journalist, politician	La cruz de los caminos, Alto Alegre
Karl Zuchardt	Germany	12 November 1968	Novelist	Wie lange noch, Bonaparte?

== Countries with life + 50 years ==
In most countries of Africa and Asia, as well as Belarus, Bolivia, New Zealand, and Egypt, a work enters the public domain 50 years after the creator's death.

Names	Country	Death	Occupation	Notable work
Leigh Brackett	United States	24 March 1978	Writer, screenwriter	Shadow Over Mars
Edmund Crispin	United Kingdom	15 September 1978	Writer, composer	Gervase Fen stories
Don Freeman	United States	1 February 1978	Cartoonist, penciler, illustrator, writer	Corduroy
Pope John Paul I	Italy; Vatican City	28 September 1978	Pope	Illustrissimi
Jane Lane	United Kingdom	6 January 1978	Writer	He Stooped to Conquer
Amelia Reynolds Long	United States	26 March 1978	Writer	Behind the Evidence
Margaret Mead	United States	15 November 1978	Anthropologist	Coming of Age in Samoa
William Middleton	United Kingdom	12 August 1978	Illustrator	The Railway Series
Hope Mirrlees	United Kingdom	1 August 1978	Writer	Lud-in-the-Mist
Ward Moore	United States	29 January 1978	Writer	Bring the Jubilee
José A. Morales	Colombia	22 September 1978	Songwriter	"Pueblito Viejo"
Carola Oman	United Kingdom	11 June 1978	Writer	The Road Royal
Pak Mok-wol	South Korea	24 March 1978	Poet	
Helmy Rafla	Egypt	22 April 1978	Director	Selected filmography
Juancho Polo Valencia	Colombia	22 July 1978	Songwriter	"Alicia Adorada"
Eric Frank Russell	United Kingdom	28 February 1978	Writer	"Allamagoosa"
Jack L. Warner	United States	9 September 1978	Filmmaker	
Armin T. Wegner	Germany	17 May 1978	Writer, human rights activist	Five Fingers Over You
Guo Moruo	China	12 June 1978	Author, poet, historian, archaeologist	Works

== Countries with life + 80 years ==
Spain has a copyright term of life + 80 years for creators that died before 1988. In Colombia and Equatorial Guinea, a work enters the public domain 80 years after the creator's death.

Names	Country	Death	Occupation	Notable work
Alexander Aaronsohn	Israel	1948	Author	With the Turks in Palestine
Sabahattin Ali	Turkey	2 April 1948	Novelist	§Works
Francisco Alonso	Spain	18 May 1948	Composer	Las Leandras
Carl Thomas Anderson	United States	4 November 1948	Cartoonist	Henry
Antonin Artaud	France	4 March 1948	Dramatist	§Works
Kan'ichi Asakawa	Japan	10 August 1948	Historian	The Russo-Japanese Conflict: Its Causes and Issues
Gertrude Atherton	United States	14 June 1948	Novelist	§Works
Jatindramohan Bagchi	India	1 February 1948	Poet	
Milan Begović	Croatia	13 May 1948	Writer	Pustolov pred vratima
Hulusi Behçet	Turkey	8 March 1948	Physician	Clinical and Practical Syphilis, Diagnosis and Related Dermatoses
Ruth Benedict	United States	17 September 1948	Anthropologist	The Chrysanthemum and the Sword
Frank Benford	United States	4 December 1948	Physicist	The law of anomalous numbers
Gertrude Barrows Bennett	United States	2 February 1948	Writer of science fiction and fantasy	The Citadel of Fear, The Heads of Cerberus, Claimed
Nikolai Berdyaev	Russia	24 March 1948	Philosopher	§Works
Folke Bernadotte	Sweden	17 September 1948	Diplomat, nobleman	§Works
Georges Bernanos	France	5 July 1948	Writer	The Diary of a Country Priest
Hendrik van der Bijl	South Africa	2 December 1948	Engineer	Theory and Operating Characteristics of the Thermionic Amplifier
Nasib al-Bitar	Palestine	26 June 1948	Jurist	Al-Fareeda Fi Hisab Al-Fareedhah
André Bloch	France	11 October 1948	Mathematician	La conception actuelle de la theorie des fonctions entieres et meromorphes
Joseph Friedrich Nicolaus Bornmüller	Germany	19 December 1948	Botanist	Beiträge zur Flora Mazedoniens
Gordon Bottomley	United Kingdom	25 August 1948	Poet, playwright	The Crier By Night
Harry Brearley	United Kingdom	14 July 1948	Metallurgist	Knotted String
Sophonisba Breckinridge	United States	30 July 1948	Economist, social scientist	Marriage and the Civic Rights of Women
Robert Briffault	United Kingdom	11 December 1948	Anthropologist, novelist	The Mothers: A Study of the Origins of Sentiments and Institutions
Abraham Brill	United States	2 March 1948	Psychiatrist	Psychoanalysis: Its Theories and Practical Application
Alice Brown	United States	21 June 1948	Writer	§Works
Subhadra Kumari Chauhan	India	15 February 1948	Poet	Jhansi Ki Rani
Hiram Alfred Cody	Canada	9 February 1948	Writer, Clergyman	The Frontiersman: A Tale of the Yukon
Umberto Coromaldi	Italy	5 October 1948	Painter	Happy Mother
Osamu Dazai	Japan	13 June 1948	Author	The Setting Sun, No Longer Human
Mary Angela Dickens	United Kingdom	7 February 1948	Writer	Cross Currents
Dildar	Iraq	12 October 1948	Poet	Ey Reqîb
Janus Djurhuus	Faroe Islands	1 September 1948	Poet	
Lawrence Donovan	United States	11 March 1948	Novelist and pulp fiction author	
Rheta Childe Dorr	United States	8 August 1948	Journalist, Suffragist	What Eight Million Women Want
O. Douglas	United Kingdom	24 November 1948	Author	Olivia in India
Sergei Eisenstein	Russia	11 February 1948	Film Director	Battleship Potemkin
Pompeu Fabra	Spain	25 December 1948	Grammarian	Diccionari General de la Llengua Catalana
Ferdinand I of Bulgaria	Bulgaria	10 September 1948	King of Bulgaria (1887–1918), author, botanist, entomologist	
Jacques Feyder	Belgium	24 May 1948	Film Director, screenwriter,	Crainquebille
William Arms Fisher	United States	18 December 1948	Composer, writer	
Zelda Fitzgerald	United States	10 March 1948	Novelist	Save Me the Waltz
Gustaf Fjæstad	Sweden	17 July 1948	Artist	
Karl Gebhardt	Germany	2 June 1948	Doctor	Chirurgische krankengymnastik
Umberto Giordano	Italy	12 November 1948	Composer	Andrea Chénier
Susan Glaspell	United States	28 July 1948	Playwright, novelist	Trifles
Arshile Gorky	United States	21 July 1948	Painter	The Liver is the Cock's Comb
D. W. Griffith	United States	23 July 1948	Film director, producer	The Birth of a Nation, Broken Blossoms
Alexander Alfonsovich Grossheim	Ukraine	4 December 1948	Botanist	
Frederick Philip Grove	Germany; Canada	9 September 1948	Writer, translator	Settlers of the Marsh
Uzeyir Hajibeyov	Azerbaijan	23 November 1948	Composer	Leyli and Majnun
Thomas William Hanforth	United Kingdom	5 June 1948	Composer	
Ernest George Henham	United Kingdom	3 April 1948	Writer	Furze the Cruel
Ernst Herzfeld	Germany	21 January 1948	Archaeologist	Die Ausgrabungen von Samarra
Johan Hjort	Norway	7 October 1948	Marine Biologist	The Depths of the Ocean
Seth Hoffman	United States	2 August 1948	Artist	
Vicente Huidobro	Chile	2 January 1948	Poet	Altazor o el viaje en paracaídas
Victor Ido	Indonesia	20 May 1948	Writer, journalist	De paupers
William Henry Irwin	United States	24 February 1948	Journalist, writer	The House That Shadows Built
Susan Sutherland Isaacs	United Kingdom	12 October 1948	Psychologist	Intellectual Growth in Young Children
Hédi Khayachi	Tunisia	1948	Painter	
Kan Kikuchi	Japan	6 March 1948	Novelist	Tōjūrō no Koi
Egon Kisch	Czech Republic	31 March 1948	Journalist, writer	Schreib das auf, Kisch!
August Köhler	Germany	12 March 1948	Physicist	Gedanken zu einem neuen Beleuchtungsverfahren für mikrophotographische Zwecke
Friedrich Freiherr Kress von Kressenstein	Germany	16 October 1948	General	Mit dem Turken zum Suezkanal
Nikolai Yakovlevich Kuznetsov	Russia	8 April 1948	Entomologist	The Eurasian Arctic Fauna and Its Origin
Franz Lehár	Hungary	24 October 1948	Composer	List of operas and operettas
Rudolf Franz Lehnert	Germany	16 January 1948	Photographer	
Maximilian Lenz	Austria	19 May 1948	Artist	A World, A Song of Spring
Monteiro Lobato	Brazil	4 July 1948	Novelist, publisher	Sítio do Picapau Amarelo (novel series)
Ross Lockridge Jr.	United States	6 March 1948	Novelist	Raintree County
Emil Ludwig	Germany	17 September 1948	Biographer	Bismarck
Edith Balfour Lyttelton	United Kingdom	2 September 1948	Writer, spiritualist	
Rikard Magnussen	Denmark	26 May 1948	Sculptor	Ole Syversen Monument
Nikola Marinov	Bulgaria	16 December 1948	Painter	
Jan Masaryk	Czech Republic	10 March 1948	Politician	Speaking to My Country
Ilya Mashkov	Russia	20 March 1944	Painter	
A. E. W. Mason	United Kingdom	22 November 1948	Author, politician	The Four Feathers
Gerardo Matos Rodríguez	Uruguay	25 April 1948	Composer	La cumparsita
Claude McKay	Jamaica	22 May 1948	Writer	§Works
Ernest Merritt	United States	5 June 1948	Physicist, educator	
Kerry Mills	United States	5 December 1948	Composer	
Harry A. Millis	United States	25 June 1948	Economist	
Wesley Clair Mitchell	United States	29 October 1948	Economist	The Role of Money in Economic Theory
Thomas Mofolo	Lesotho	8 September 1948	Writer	Chaka
Prosper Montagné	France	22 April 1948	Chef, Gastronome	Larousse Gastronomique
Sylvanus Morley	United States	2 September 1948	Archeologist	The Ancient Maya
Na Hye-sŏk	South Korea	10 December 1948	Painter	Works
Baldassarre Negroni	Italy	18 July 1948	Film director	The Courier of Moncenisio
Fred Niblo	United States	7 November 1948	Film Director, actor	Ben-Hur: A Tale of the Christ
Alan Odle	United Kingdom	1948	Illustrator	
Edith Olivier	United Kingdom	10 May 1948	Writer	Alexander the Corrector: The Eccentric Life of Alexander Cruden
Conal Holmes O'Connell O'Riordan	Ireland	18 June 1948	Dramatist, novelist	Adam of Dublin
Margaret Pedler	United Kingdom	28 December 1948	Romance Author	Barbarian Lover
John J. Pershing	United States	15 July 1948	General	My Experiences in the World War
Albert Pollard	United Kingdom	3 August 1948	Historian	The Evolution of Parliament
Manuel Ponce	Mexico	24 April 1948	Composer	Estrellita
Abram Ranovich	Russia	29 May 1948	Historian	On Early Christianity
Charles Herbert Reilly	United Kingdom	2 February 1948	Architect	Representative British Architects of the Present Day
Charles Grant Robertson	United Kingdom	29 February 1948	Historian, novelist	England under the Hanoverians
J.-H. Rosny jeune	Belgium; France	21 July 1948	Writer	
Sultanzade Sabahaddin	Turkey	30 June 1948	Sociologist	The Witness
Husain Salaahuddin	Maldives	20 September 1948	Writer	The Story of Thakurufaan the Great
Maria Olga de Moraes Sarmento da Silveira	Portugal	17 October 1948	Writer, feminist	Problema Feminista
Kurt Schwitters	Germany	8 January 1948	Artist	Das Undbild
Antonin Sertillanges	France	26 July 1948	Priest, author	What Jesus Saw from the Cross
Lamed Shapiro	United States	1948	Author	Di yidishe melukhe un andere zakhn
D. D. Sheehan	Ireland	28 November 1948	Politician, author	Ireland since Parnell
David Shterenberg	Russia	1 May 1948	Painter and graphic artist	§Works
Charles Silvestre	France	31 March 1948	Novelist	§Works
Annie M. P. Smithson	Ireland	21 February 1948	Author, nurse.	The Walk of a Queen
Marjory Stephenson	United Kingdom	12 December 1948	Biochemist	
Montague Summers	United Kingdom	10 August 1948	Author and clergyman	Malleus Maleficarum
Alexander du Toit	South Africa	25 February 1948	Geologist	Our Wandering Continents; An Hypothesis of Continental Drifting
Richard C. Tolman	United States	5 September 1948	Physicist	The Principles of Statistical Mechanics
Karl Valentin	Germany	9 February 1948	Comedian	§Works
José Vianna da Motta	Portugal	1 June 1948	Pianist, composer	§Works
Franco Vittadini	Italy	30 November 1948	Composer	Anima allegra
Augusto Weberbauer	Germany	16 January 1948	Botanist	Die Pflanzenwelt der peruanischen Anden in ihren Grundzügen
Paul Wegener	Germany	13 September 1948	Film Director, screenwriter	The Student of Prague
Ermanno Wolf-Ferrari	Italy	21 January 1948	Composer	Il segreto di Susanna
George MacKinnon Wrong	Canada	29 June 1948	Historian	The Conquest of New France
Muhammad Amin Zaki	Iraq	1948	Historian	A Short History of the Kurds and Kurdistan
Andrei Zhdanov	Russia	31 August 1948	Politician	Советская литература, Стахановцы настоящие большевики производства

== United States ==
The trailer is from an unknown year and is for a re-issue of King Kong. The story and characters were in the public domain even before the film's release due to classification errors on certain preemptive tie-in material; the film as a complete product will enter the public domain in 2029.

Under the Copyright Term Extension Act, books published in 1933, films released in 1933, and other works published in 1933 will enter the public domain in 2029. Sound recordings published in 1928 and unpublished works whose authors died in 1958 will also enter the public domain.

Notable films entering the public domain in 2029 include the original King Kong and its sequel Son of Kong, Lloyd Bacon's musical films 42nd Street and Footlight Parade, Fritz Lang's The Testament of Dr. Mabuse, the Universal Monsters film The Invisible Man with Claude Rains, Best Picture Academy Award-winner Cavalcade, Alfred E. Green's Baby Face with Barbara Stanwyck and George Brent, George Cukor's adaptation of Little Women with Katharine Hepburn, Norman Z. McLeod's adaptation of Alice in Wonderland which later influenced Walt Disney's own 1951 animated adaptation, the Marx Brothers musical comedy Duck Soup, Ecstasy with Hedy Lamarr in her acting debut, the John Ford films Doctor Bull and Pilgrimage, Mervyn LeRoy's Tugboat Annie and Gold Diggers of 1933 (the latter of which he co-directed with Busby Berkeley), the Mae West films She Done Him Wrong and I'm No Angel, Frank Tuttle's Roman Scandals, Alexander Korda's The Private Life of Henry VIII (the first British film to win an Oscar), Lowell Sherman's Morning Glory with Hepburn and Douglas Fairbanks Jr., the original State Fair (which inspired the more famous 1945 Rodgers and Hammerstein musical film), William J. Cowen's adaptation of Oliver Twist, Cukor's Dinner at Eight, Frank Capra's Lady for a Day and The Bitter Tea of General Yen, Raoul Walsh's Going Hollywood with Marion Davies and Bing Crosby, Victor and Victoria which was later remade into the 1982 film starring Julie Andrews, Jean Vigo's Zero for Conduct, Walt Disney's Silly Symphony cartoon Three Little Pigs, the first full year of Looney Tunes and Merrie Melodies short films that had their copyrights renewed (including the first ones to be produced by Leon Schlesinger), and the first six animated Popeye cartoons produced at Fleischer Studios. The first Nazi feature films Hitlerjunge Quex, Hans Westmar, Refugees, and S.A.-Mann Brand will also enter the American public domain.

Literary works entering the public domain include H. G. Wells's sci-fi novel The Shape of Things to Come, the children’s book The Story About Ping by Marjorie Flack, James Hilton's novel Lost Horizon introducing Shangri-La, Edwin Balmer and Philip Wylie's science fiction novel When Worlds Collide, Dashiell Hammett's novel The Thin Man introducing Nick and Nora Charles, George Orwell's first novel Down and Out in Paris and London, Virginia Woolf's novel Flush: A Biography, C. L. Moore's short story Shambleau, Ernest Hemingway's short story collection Winner Take Nothing, Agatha Christie's Hercule Poirot mystery novel Lord Edgware Dies and her short story collection The Hound of Death and Other Stories, C. S. Lewis's debut novel The Pilgrim's Regress, Erle Stanley Gardner's detective novel The Case of the Velvet Claws introducing Perry Mason, Raymond Chandler's short story Blackmailers Don't Shoot, John Steinbeck's novel To a God Unknown, The Hardy Boys' twelfth novel Footprints Under the Window, the Nancy Drew Mystery Stories The Sign of the Twisted Candles and The Password to Larkspur Lane, Federico García Lorca's play Blood Wedding in its original Spanish, Willem Elsschots novel Cheese in its original Dutch, Osip Mandelstam's Stalin Epigram in its original Russian, Kornel Makuszyński's first comic books of Koziołek Matołek in their original Polish, and the first editions of Newsweek and Indonesian Avant Garde magazine Poedjangga Baroe. The 14th edition of the Encyclopædia Britannica will complete its entry into the public domain. The radio characters The Lone Ranger and Tonto were already in the public domain, as the copyrights for the scripts of the show's first episodes were not renewed. The comic character Nancy Ritz created by Ernie Bushmiller was likewise already in the public domain with no renewed copyrights for any of her strips.

Artworks entering the public domain include Diego Rivera's destroyed mural Man at the Crossroads and his Detroit Industry Murals, René Magritte's painting The Human Condition, Frida Kahlo's painting My Dress Hangs There, Henri Cartier-Bresson's photograph Seville, Spain, and the first design of Alvar Aalto's Model 60 stacking stool.

Among the better-known songs entering the public domain are "We're in the Money", "Smoke Gets in Your Eyes", "I've Got the World on a String" and two of the songs from 42nd Street: the title song and "Shuffle Off to Buffalo". Additionally, the entry of Three Little Pigs will bring along the song "Who's Afraid of the Big Bad Wolf?", the first hit song from Disney's studio and an anthem of the Great Depression, while that of the first Popeye cartoons will bring with it "I'm Popeye the Sailor Man", the character's official theme song.

== See also ==
- List of American films of 1933
- 1933 in literature
- 1933 in music
- 1958 in literature and 1978 in literature for deaths of writers
- Public Domain Day
- Creative Commons
- 2030 in public domain
