= 2019 in public domain =

When a work's copyright expires, it enters the public domain. The following is a list of works that entered the public domain in 2019. Since laws vary globally, the copyright status of some works are not uniform.

== Entering the public domain in countries with life + 70 years ==
With the exception of Spain (which has a copyright term of Life + 80 years for creators that died before 1987), a work enters the public domain in the European Union 70 years after the creator's death, if it was published during the creator's lifetime. For previously unpublished material, those who publish it first will have the publication rights for 25 years. Russia uses Life + 74 for authors who worked during World War II, otherwise copyright is Life + 70. The list is sorted alphabetically and includes a notable work of the creator that entered the public domain on January 1, 2019.

| Names | Country | Death | Occupation | Notable work |
|---|---|---|---|---|
| Alexander Aaronsohn | Israel | 1948 | Author | With the Turks in Palestine |
| Sabahattin Ali | Turkey | 2 April 1948 | Novelist | §Works |
| Francisco Alonso | Spain | 18 May 1948 | Composer | Las Leandras |
| Carl Thomas Anderson | United States | 4 November 1948 | Cartoonist | Henry |
| Antonin Artaud | France | 4 March 1948 | Dramatist | §Works |
| Kan'ichi Asakawa | Japan | 10 August 1948 | Historian | The Russo-Japanese Conflict: Its Causes and Issues |
| Gertrude Atherton | United States | 14 June 1948 | Novelist | §Works |
| Jatindramohan Bagchi | India | 1 February 1948 | Poet | |
| Milan Begović | Croatia | 13 May 1948 | Writer | Pustolov pred vratima |
| Hulusi Behçet | Turkey | 8 March 1948 | Physician | Clinical and Practical Syphilis, Diagnosis and Related Dermatoses |
| Ruth Benedict | United States | 17 September 1948 | Anthropologist | The Chrysanthemum and the Sword |
| Frank Benford | United States | 4 December 1948 | Physicist | The law of anomalous numbers |
| Gertrude Barrows Bennett | United States | 2 February 1948 | Writer of science fiction and fantasy | The Citadel of Fear, The Heads of Cerberus, Claimed |
| Nikolai Berdyaev | Russia | 24 March 1948 | Philosopher | §Works |
| Folke Bernadotte | Sweden | 17 September 1948 | Diplomat, nobleman | §Works |
| Georges Bernanos | France | 5 July 1948 | Writer | The Diary of a Country Priest |
| Hendrik van der Bijl | South Africa | 2 December 1948 | Engineer | Theory and Operating Characteristics of the Thermionic Amplifier |
| Nasib al-Bitar | Palestine | 26 June 1948 | Jurist | Al-Fareeda Fi Hisab Al-Fareedhah |
| André Bloch | France | 11 October 1948 | Mathematician | La conception actuelle de la theorie des fonctions entieres et meromorphes |
| Joseph Friedrich Nicolaus Bornmüller | Germany | 19 December 1948 | Botanist | Beiträge zur Flora Mazedoniens |
| Gordon Bottomley | United Kingdom | 25 August 1948 | Poet, playwright | The Crier By Night |
| Harry Brearley | United Kingdom | 14 July 1948 | Metallurgist | Knotted String |
| Sophonisba Breckinridge | United States | 30 July 1948 | Economist, social scientist | Marriage and the Civic Rights of Women |
| Robert Briffault | United Kingdom | 11 December 1948 | Anthropologist, novelist | The Mothers: A Study of the Origins of Sentiments and Institutions |
| Abraham Brill | United States | 2 March 1948 | Psychiatrist | Psychoanalysis: Its Theories and Practical Application |
| Alice Brown | United States | 21 June 1948 | Writer | §Works |
| Subhadra Kumari Chauhan | India | 15 February 1948 | Poet | Jhansi Ki Rani |
| Hiram Alfred Cody | Canada | 9 February 1948 | Writer, Clergyman | The Frontiersman: A Tale of the Yukon |
| Umberto Coromaldi | Italy | 5 October 1948 | Painter | Happy Mother |
| Osamu Dazai | Japan | 13 June 1948 | Author | The Setting Sun, No Longer Human |
| Mary Angela Dickens | United Kingdom | 7 February 1948 | Writer | Cross Currents |
| Dildar | Iraq | 12 October 1948 | Poet | Ey Reqîb |
| Janus Djurhuus | Faroe Islands | 1 September 1948 | Poet | |
| Lawrence Donovan | United States | 11 March 1948 | Novelist and pulp fiction author | |
| Rheta Childe Dorr | United States | 8 August 1948 | Journalist, Suffragist | What Eight Million Women Want |
| O. Douglas | United Kingdom | 24 November 1948 | Author | Olivia in India |
| Sergei Eisenstein | Russia | 11 February 1948 | Film Director | Battleship Potemkin |
| Pompeu Fabra | Spain | 25 December 1948 | Grammarian | Diccionari General de la Llengua Catalana |
| Ferdinand I of Bulgaria | Bulgaria | 10 September 1948 | King of Bulgaria (1887–1918), author, botanist, entomologist | |
| Jacques Feyder | Belgium | 24 May 1948 | Film Director, screenwriter, | Crainquebille |
| William Arms Fisher | United States | 18 December 1948 | Composer, writer | |
| Zelda Fitzgerald | United States | 10 March 1948 | Novelist | Save Me the Waltz |
| Gustaf Fjæstad | Sweden | 17 July 1948 | Artist | |
| Karl Gebhardt | Germany | 2 June 1948 | Doctor | Chirurgische krankengymnastik |
| Umberto Giordano | Italy | 12 November 1948 | Composer | Andrea Chénier |
| Susan Glaspell | United States | 28 July 1948 | Playwright, novelist | Trifles |
| Arshile Gorky | United States | 21 July 1948 | Painter | The Liver Is the Cock's Comb |
| D. W. Griffith | United States | 23 July 1948 | Film director, producer | The Birth of a Nation, Broken Blossoms |
| Alexander Alfonsovich Grossheim | Ukraine | 4 December 1948 | Botanist | |
| Frederick Philip Grove | Germany; Canada | 9 September 1948 | Writer, translator | Settlers of the Marsh |
| Uzeyir Hajibeyov | Azerbaijan | 23 November 1948 | Composer | Leyli and Majnun |
| Thomas William Hanforth | United Kingdom | 5 June 1948 | Composer | |
| Ernest George Henham | United Kingdom | 3 April 1948 | Writer | Furze the Cruel |
| Ernst Herzfeld | Germany | 21 January 1948 | Archaeologist | Die Ausgrabungen von Samarra |
| Johan Hjort | Norway | 7 October 1948 | Marine Biologist | The Depths of the Ocean |
| Seth Hoffman | United States | 2 August 1948 | Artist | |
| Vicente Huidobro | Chile | 2 January 1948 | Poet | Altazor o el viaje en paracaídas |
| Victor Ido | Indonesia | 20 May 1948 | Writer, journalist | De paupers |
| William Henry Irwin | United States | 24 February 1948 | Journalist, writer | The House That Shadows Built |
| Susan Sutherland Isaacs | United Kingdom | 12 October 1948 | Psychologist | Intellectual Growth in Young Children |
| Hédi Khayachi | Tunisia | 1948 | Painter | |
| Kan Kikuchi | Japan | 6 March 1948 | Novelist | Tōjūrō no Koi |
| Egon Kisch | Czech Republic | 31 March 1948 | Journalist, writer | Schreib das auf, Kisch! |
| August Köhler | Germany | 12 March 1948 | Physicist | Gedanken zu einem neuen Beleuchtungsverfahren für mikrophotographische Zwecke |
| Friedrich Freiherr Kress von Kressenstein | Germany | 16 October 1948 | General | Mit dem Turken zum Suezkanal |
| Nikolai Yakovlevich Kuznetsov | Russia | 8 April 1948 | Entomologist | The Eurasian Arctic Fauna and Its Origin |
| Franz Lehár | Hungary | 24 October 1948 | Composer | List of operas and operettas |
| Rudolf Franz Lehnert | Germany | 16 January 1948 | Photographer | |
| Maximilian Lenz | Austria | 19 May 1948 | Artist | A World, A Song of Spring |
| Monteiro Lobato | Brazil | 4 July 1948 | Novelist, publisher | Sítio do Picapau Amarelo (novel series) |
| Ross Lockridge Jr. | United States | 6 March 1948 | Novelist | Raintree County |
| Emil Ludwig | Germany | 17 September 1948 | Biographer | Bismarck |
| Edith Balfour Lyttelton | United Kingdom | 2 September 1948 | Writer, spiritualist | |
| Nikola Marinov | Bulgaria | 16 December 1948 | Painter | |
| Jan Masaryk | Czech Republic | 10 March 1948 | Politician | Speaking to My Country |
| Ilya Mashkov | Russia | 20 March 1944 | Painter | |
| A. E. W. Mason | United Kingdom | 22 November 1948 | Author, politician | The Four Feathers |
| Gerardo Matos Rodríguez | Uruguay | 25 April 1948 | Composer | La cumparsita |
| Claude McKay | Jamaica | 22 May 1948 | Writer | §Works |
| Ernest Merritt | United States | 5 June 1948 | Physicist, educator | |
| Kerry Mills | United States | 5 December 1948 | Composer | |
| Harry A. Millis | United States | 25 June 1948 | Economist | |
| Wesley Clair Mitchell | United States | 29 October 1948 | Economist | The Role of Money in Economic Theory |
| Thomas Mofolo | Lesotho | 8 September 1948 | Writer | Chaka |
| Prosper Montagné | France | 22 April 1948 | Chef, Gastronome | Larousse Gastronomique |
| Sylvanus Morley | United States | 2 September 1948 | Archeologist | The Ancient Maya |
| Na Hye-sŏk | South Korea | 10 December 1948 | Painter | Works |
| Baldassarre Negroni | Italy | 18 July 1948 | Film director | The Courier of Moncenisio |
| Fred Niblo | United States | 7 November 1948 | Film Director, actor | Ben-Hur: A Tale of the Christ |
| Alan Odle | United Kingdom | 1948 | Illustrator | |
| Edith Olivier | United Kingdom | 10 May 1948 | Writer | Alexander the Corrector: The Eccentric Life of Alexander Cruden |
| Conal Holmes O'Connell O'Riordan | Ireland | 18 June 1948 | Dramatist, novelist | Adam of Dublin |
| Margaret Pedler | United Kingdom | 28 December 1948 | Romance Author | Barbarian Lover |
| John J. Pershing | United States | 15 July 1948 | General | My Experiences in the World War |
| Albert Pollard | United Kingdom | 3 August 1948 | Historian | The Evolution of Parliament |
| Manuel Ponce | Mexico | 24 April 1948 | Composer | Estrellita |
| Abram Ranovich | Russia | 29 May 1948 | Historian | On Early Christianity |
| Charles Herbert Reilly | United Kingdom | 2 February 1948 | Architect | Representative British Architects of the Present Day |
| Charles Grant Robertson | United Kingdom | 29 February 1948 | Historian, novelist | England under the Hanoverians |
| J.-H. Rosny jeune | Belgium; France | 21 July 1948 | Writer | |
| Sultanzade Sabahaddin | Turkey | 30 June 1948 | Sociologist | The Witness |
| Husain Salaahuddin | Maldives | 20 September 1948 | Writer | The Story of Thakurufaan the Great |
| Maria Olga de Moraes Sarmento da Silveira | Portugal | 17 October 1948 | Writer, feminist | Problema Feminista |
| Kurt Schwitters | Germany | 8 January 1948 | Artist | Das Undbild |
| Antonin Sertillanges | France | 26 July 1948 | Priest, author | What Jesus Saw from the Cross |
| Lamed Shapiro | United States | 1948 | Author | Di yidishe melukhe un andere zakhn |
| D. D. Sheehan | Ireland | 28 November 1948 | Politician, author | Ireland since Parnell |
| David Shterenberg | Russia | 1 May 1948 | Painter and graphic artist | §Works |
| Charles Silvestre | France | 31 March 1948 | Novelist | §Works |
| Annie M. P. Smithson | Ireland | 21 February 1948 | Author, nurse. | The Walk of a Queen |
| Marjory Stephenson | United Kingdom | 12 December 1948 | Biochemist | |
| Montague Summers | United Kingdom | 10 August 1948 | Author and clergyman | Malleus Maleficarum |
| Alexander du Toit | South Africa | 25 February 1948 | Geologist | Our Wandering Continents; An Hypothesis of Continental Drifting |
| Richard C. Tolman | United States | 5 September 1948 | Physicist | The Principles of Statistical Mechanics |
| Karl Valentin | Germany | 9 February 1948 | Comedian | §Works |
| José Vianna da Motta | Portugal | 1 June 1948 | Pianist, composer | §Works |
| Franco Vittadini | Italy | 30 November 1948 | Composer | Anima allegra |
| Augusto Weberbauer | Germany | 16 January 1948 | Botanist | Die Pflanzenwelt der peruanischen Anden in ihren Grundzügen |
| Paul Wegener | Germany | 13 September 1948 | Film Director, screenwriter | The Student of Prague |
| Ermanno Wolf-Ferrari | Italy | 21 January 1948 | Composer | Il segreto di Susanna |
| George MacKinnon Wrong | Canada | 29 June 1948 | Historian | The Conquest of New France |
| Muhammad Amin Zaki | Iraq | 1948 | Historian | A Short History of the Kurds and Kurdistan |
| Andrei Zhdanov | Russia | 31 August 1948 | Politician | Советская литература, Стахановцы настоящие большевики производства |

== Entering the public domain in countries with life + 60 years ==
In Bangladesh, India, and Venezuela a work enters the public domain 60 years after the creator's death.

| Names | Country | Death | Occupation | Notable work |
|---|---|---|---|---|
| Eleanor Hallowell Abbott | United States | 4 June 1958 | novelist, poet, short story writer | Molly Make-Believe, But Once A Year: Christmas Stories |
| Johannes R. Becher | Germany | 11 October 1958 | politician, novelist, and poet | Auferstanden aus Ruinen |
| James Branch Cabell | United States | 5 May 1958 | fantasy writer | Jurgen, A Comedy of Justice, Biography of the Life of Manuel |
| Virginia Brindis de Salas | Uruguay | 6 April 1958 | Poet | Pregón de Marimorena |
| Harry Cohn | United States | 27 February 1958 | Filmmaker | |
| E. Everett Evans | United States | 2 December 1958 | Science fiction author | |
| Margiad Evans | United Kingdom | 17 March 1958 | illustrator, novelist, poet | Country Dance, Autobiography, A Ray of Darkness, The Nightingale Silenced |
| Dorothy Canfield Fisher | United States | 9 November 1958 | literary critic, memoirist, novelist, short story writer, translator | Understood Betsy |
| Marjorie Flack | United States | 29 August 1958 | children's writer, illustrator | writer of The Story About Ping, illustrator of The Country Bunny and the Little Gold Shoes |
| Lion Feuchtwanger | Germany | 21 December 1958 | writer, journalist, novelist and playwright | author of Jud Süß (Süss, the Jew) |
| Angelina Weld Grimké | United States | 10 June 1958 | playwright, poet | Rachel |
| Juan Ramón Jiménez | Spain | 29 May 1958 | Poet | |
| Michael Joseph | United Kingdom | 15 March 1958 | Writer, publisher | How to Write Serial Fiction, Puss in Books: A collection of stories about cats, The Sword in the Scabbard |
| Maxim Kopf | Austria-Hungary; Czechoslovakia; United States | 6 July 1958 | Painter, graphic artist and sculptor | paintings from Tahiti and the Marquesas Islands |
| Cyril M. Kornbluth | United States | 21 March 1958 | science fiction writer | The Little Black Bag, The Marching Morons |
| Henry Kuttner | United States | 3 February 1958 | Writer of fantasy, horror fiction, and science fiction. | The Graveyard Rats, Mimsy Were the Borogoves |
| Charles Kvapil | Belgium | 21 December 1958 | Painter | |
| Rose Macaulay | United Kingdom | 30 October 1958 | biographer, novelist, travel writer | The World My Wilderness, The Towers of Trebizond |
| Ismail Marzuki | Indonesia | 15 May 1958 | composer, songwriter | Gugur Bunga, Halo, Halo Bandung, Indonesia Pusaka |
| Johnston McCulley | United States | 23 November 1958 | Author | Zorro |
| G. E. Moore | United Kingdom | 24 October 1958 | journal editor, philosopher | Principia Ethica, A Defence of Common Sense |
| Charles Langbridge Morgan | United Kingdom | 6 February 1958 | novelist, playwright | The Burning Glass |
| Alfred Noyes | United Kingdom | 25 June 1958 | playwright, poet, short story writer | The Highwayman, Shakespeare's Kingdom |
| Seumas O'Sullivan | Ireland | 24 March 1958 | magazine editor, poet | Twilight People, Verses Sacred and Profane |
| Elliot Paul | United States | 7 April 1958 | journalist, novelist, screenwriter | Life and Death of a Spanish Town, Linden on the Saugus Branch |
| H. G. Peter | United States | 2 January 1958 | Cartoonist | Wonder Woman |
| Nicolae Petrescu-Comnen | Romania | 8 December 1958 | social scientist | Accidente profesionale (Work-related Accidents), Câteva considerațiuni asupra socialismului și asupra roadelor sale (Some Musings on Socialism and Its Results |
| Rudolph Rocker | Germany; United Kingdom; United States | 19 September 1958 | anarchist publisher and activist | Nationalism and Culture |
| Peig Sayers | Ireland | 8 December 1958 | seanchaí (traditional Gaelic storyteller and historian) | Peig, Machnamh Seanmhná (An Old Woman's Reflections) |
| Robert W. Service | Canada | 11 September 1958 | poet | The Shooting of Dan McGrew, The Cremation of Sam McGee |
| J. C. Squire | United Kingdom | 20 December 1958 | historian, literary critic, magazine editor, poet | Robin Hood: a farcical romantic pastoral, Shakespeare as a Dramatist |
| John Reed Swanton | United States | 2 May 1958 | anthropologist, folklorist, linguist | The Indian Tribes of North America, Emanuel Swedenborg, Prophet of the Higher Evolution |
| Ethel Turner | Australia | 8 April 1958 | children's writer, novelist | Seven Little Australians |
| Ralph Vaughan Williams | United Kingdom | 26 August 1958 | Composer | A London Symphony |
| Geoffrey Willans | United Kingdom | 6 August 1958 | children's writer, humorist, novelist, screenwriter | Down with Skool! A Guide to School Life for Tiny Pupils and their Parents, Whizz for Atomms: A Guide to Survival in the 20th Century for Fellow Pupils, their Doting Maters, Pompous Paters and Any Others who are Interested |

== Entering the public domain in countries with life + 50 years ==
In most countries of Africa and Asia, as well as Belarus, Bolivia, Canada, New Zealand and Uruguay; a work enters the public domain 50 years after the creator's death.

| Names | Country | Death | Occupation | Notable work |
|---|---|---|---|---|
| Peter Arno | United States | 22 February 1968 | Cartoonist | |
| Karl Barth | Switzerland | 10 December 1968 | Theologian | Church Dogmatics |
| Enid Blyton | United Kingdom | 28 November 1968 | Writer | The Famous Five, The Secret Seven, Noddy |
| Hugo Butler | United States | 7 January 1968 | Screenwriter | Lassie Come Home |
| Mario Castelnuovo-Tedesco | Italy | 16 March 1968 | Composer | Les Guitares bien tempérées |
| Juan José Castro | Argentina | 3 September 1968 | Composer | |
| Randolph Churchill | United Kingdom | 6 June 1968 | Journalist, politician | Lord Derby: King of Lancashire |
| Carmelo de Arzadun | Uruguay | 16 October 1968 | Painter | |
| Kees van Dongen | Netherlands | 28 May 1968 | Painter | Woman with Large Hat |
| Carl Theodor Dreyer | Denmark | 20 March 1968 | Film Director | Michael |
| Marcel Duchamp | France | 2 October 1968 | Artist, writer | Nude Descending a Staircase, No. 2, Fountain |
| Margaret Duley | Canada | 22 March 1968 | Novelist | §Works |
| Edna Ferber | United States | 15 April 1968 | Novelist, playwright | So Big, Show Boat |
| Red Foley | United States | 19 September 1968 | Singer-songwriter | Old Shep |
| Lucio Fontana | Italy | 7 September 1968 | Painter, sculptor | |
| Ruth France | New Zealand | 19 August 1968 | Librarian, poet, novelist | The Race |
| George Gamow | Soviet Union; United States | 19 August 1968 | Physicist, Science writer | One Two Three... Infinity and Mr. Tompkins series |
| Alice Guy-Blaché | France | 24 March 1968 | Filmmaker, screenwriter | La Fée aux Choux |
| Otto Hahn | Germany | 28 July 1968 | Chemist | Applied Radiochemistry |
| John Heartfield | Germany | 26 April 1968 | Artist | |
| Fannie Hurst | United States | 23 February 1968 | Novelist | Imitation of Life, Lummox |
| Muhammad Taha al-Huwayzi | IranIraq | 4 April 1968 | Religious teacher, poet | Tā'liqāt fī mustafīḍah al-fiqh wa-al-uṣūl |
| W. E. Johns | United Kingdom | 21 June 1968 | Writer, aviator | The Biggles series |
| Anna Kavan | United Kingdom | 5 December 1968 | Writer | Ice |
| Helen Keller | United States | 1 June 1968 | Author, activist | The Story of My Life |
| Robert F. Kennedy | United States | 6 June 1968 | Politician, lawyer, author | The Enemy Within |
| Martin Luther King Jr. | United States | 4 April 1968 | Civil rights leader, minister | Why We Can't Wait |
| Robert Z. Leonard | United States | 27 August 1968 | Film Director, screenwriter | The Great Ziegfeld |
| Albert Lewin | United States | 9 May 1968 | Director, screenwriter | The Picture of Dorian Gray |
| Trygve Lie | Norway | 30 December 1968 | Politician, author | In the Cause of Peace: Seven Years With The United Nations |
| Howard Lindsay | United States | 11 February 1968 | Playwright, librettist | State of the Union |
| Little Walter | United States | 15 February 1968 | Blues musician | Juke |
| Dorothea Mackellar | Australia | 14 January 1968 | Poet | My Country |
| Archie Mayo | United States | 4 December 1968 | Film director, actor | Night After Night |
| Ramón Menéndez Pidal | Spain | 14 November 1968 | Historian | La España del Cid |
| Thomas Merton | United States | 10 December 1968 | Monk, author | The Seven Storey Mountain |
| José Monegal | Uruguay | 4 November 1968 | Writer, journalist | Memorias de Juan Pedro Camargo |
| Wes Montgomery | United States | 15 June 1968 | Jazz guitarist | The Incredible Jazz Guitar of Wes Montgomery |
| Elsie K. Morton | New Zealand | 21 August 1968 | Journalist, writer | Along the Road: a book of New Zealand life and travel |
| Walter Nash | New Zealand | 4 June 1968 | Politician | New Zealand: a working democracy |
| Edwin O'Connor | United States | 23 March 1968 | Novelist, journalist | The Last Hurrah, The Edge of Sadness |
| Erwin Panofsky | United States | 14 March 1968 | Art Historian | Early Netherlandish Painting |
| Mervyn Peake | United Kingdom | 17 November 1968 | Writer | Gormenghast Trilogy |
| Salvatore Quasimodo | Italy | 14 June 1968 | Writer | Giorno dopo giorno |
| Herbert Read | United Kingdom | 12 June 1968 | Art Historian | To Hell With Culture |
| Conrad Richter | United States | 30 October 1968 | Novelist | The Town |
| Nelle Scanlan | New Zealand | 5 October 1968 | Novelist, journalist | The Pencarrow series |
| Upton Sinclair | United States | 25 November 1968 | Writer | The Jungle |
| John Steinbeck | United States | 20 December 1968 | Novelist | Of Mice and Men, The Grapes of Wrath |
| Tian Han | China | 10 December 1968 | Playwright | Xie Yaohuan |
| Rose Wilder Lane | United States | 30 October 1968 | Writer, Political Theorist | The Discovery of Freedom |
| Clare Winger Harris | United States | October 1968 | Writer | Away From the Here and Now |
| Justino Zavala Muniz | Uruguay | 23 March 1968 | Writer, playwright, historian, journalist, politician | La cruz de los caminos, Alto Alegre |
| Karl Zuchardt | Germany | 12 November 1968 | Novelist | Wie lange noch, Bonaparte? |

== Entering the public domain in Australia ==
In 2004 copyright in Australia changed from a "plus 50" law to a "plus 70" law, in line with the United States and the European Union. But the change was not made retroactive (unlike the 1995 change in the European Union which brought some e.g. British authors back into copyright, especially those who died from 1925 to 1944). Hence the work of an author who died before 1955 is normally in the public domain in Australia; but the copyright of authors was extended to 70 years after death for those who died in 1955 or later, and no more Australian authors would come out of copyright until 1 January 2026 (those who died in 1955).

On January 1, 2019, any unpublished work by an author who died in 1948 or before entered the public domain. Additionally, any published literary, artistic, dramatic, or musical work (other than computer programs) by a not generally known author (anonymous or pseudonymous) from 1948 or before entered the public domain.

== Entering the public domain in the United States ==
Safety Last! entered the public domain in the US in 2019.

2019 was the first year since 1998 in which the majority of media from a previous year entered the public domain after the expiration of its copyright term. 2019 is also the first year in this annual process, where 1923 works become public domain that year, then 1924 works in 2020, and so on forward.

Under the Copyright Term Extension Act, books, films, and other works published in the United States in 1923 entered the public domain in 2019. Additionally, unpublished works whose authors died in 1948 entered the public domain. Foreign works from 1923 that were never published in the United States may be in the public domain as well. This was the first time since January 1, 1998, that a new group of works entered the public domain in the United States. From now on, works governed by the Copyright Act of 1909 will enter the public domain at the end of the 95th calendar year from publication. For example, 1924 works entered the public domain on January 1, 2020, 1925 works in 2021, and so forth.

No United States audio recordings entered the public domain (as those fixed before February 15, 1972 were covered by state laws only), but international audio recordings published in 1923 entered the public domain in 2019. Under the Music Modernization Act, 1923 domestic audio recordings entered the public domain in 2024. However, all sheet music published in 1923 in the United States entered the public domain in 2019.

Some of the works that entered public domain are The Great American Novel by William Carlos Williams, Charlie Chaplin's The Pilgrim, Harold Lloyd's Safety Last!, Robert Frost's Stopping by Woods on a Snowy Evening, Kahlil Gibran's The Prophet, The Murder on the Links by Agatha Christie, Cecil B. DeMille’s The Ten Commandments, Aldous Huxley's Antic Hay, and the first 2 volumes of Winston Churchill’s The World Crisis. While Christie, Huxley, and Churchill were all non-American authors, these works were also published in the United States and their copyright was registered and renewed. Hence, copyright expired in 2019.

== Worldwide ==
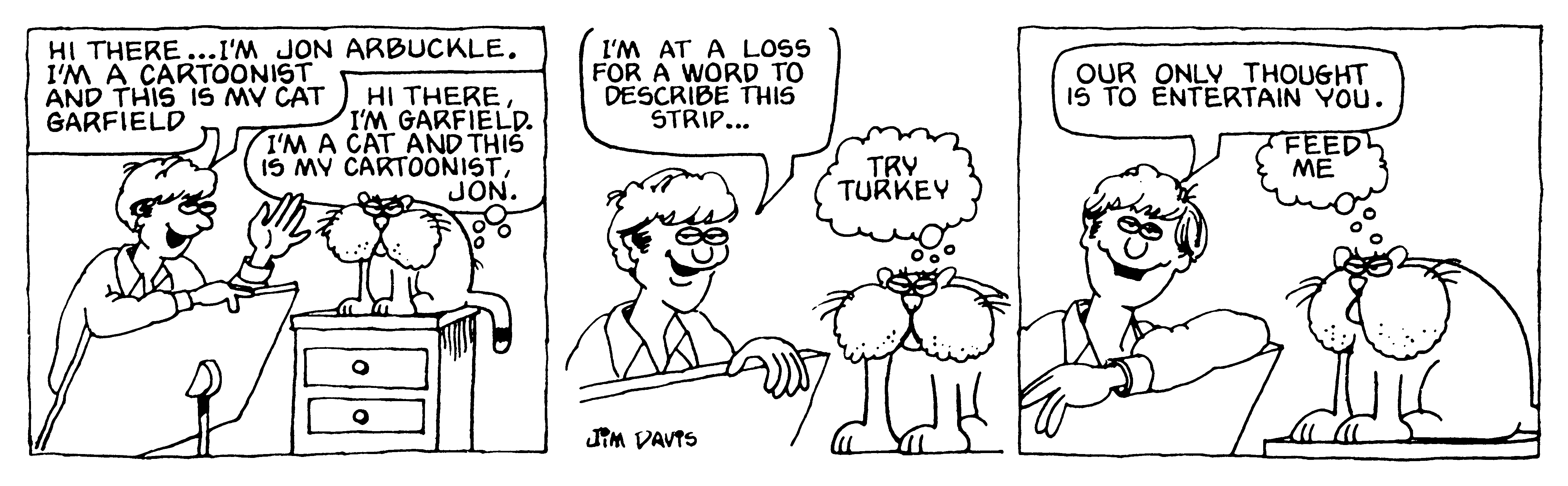
The first Jon comic by Jim Davis, which was repurposed into the first Garfield comic

On January 24, 2019 it was announced that Nina Paley was placing her 2018 film Seder-Masochism in the public domain.

On January 13, 2019, the Cleveland Museum of Art released 30,000 high quality digital images into the public domain.

The European Commission announced it will start using a CC0-license to share published documents, including photos, videos, reports, peer-reviewed studies, and data.

Jim Davis's lost first comics from the 1970s, Gnorm Gnat and Jon (a prototypical iteration of the famous Garfield) were discovered by YouTuber Quinton Reviews, making it public knowledge that the characters and jokes within are public domain, as the comics and Pendleton Times newspaper were published without copyright notices.

== See also ==
- List of American films of 1923
- List of countries' copyright lengths
- Public Domain Day
- Creative Commons
- Public Domain
- Over 300 public domain authors available in Wikisource (any language), with descriptions from Wikidata
- 1948 in literature, 1958 in literature, 1968 in literature and 1978 in literature
