= Georges Lecomte =

French novelist and playwright

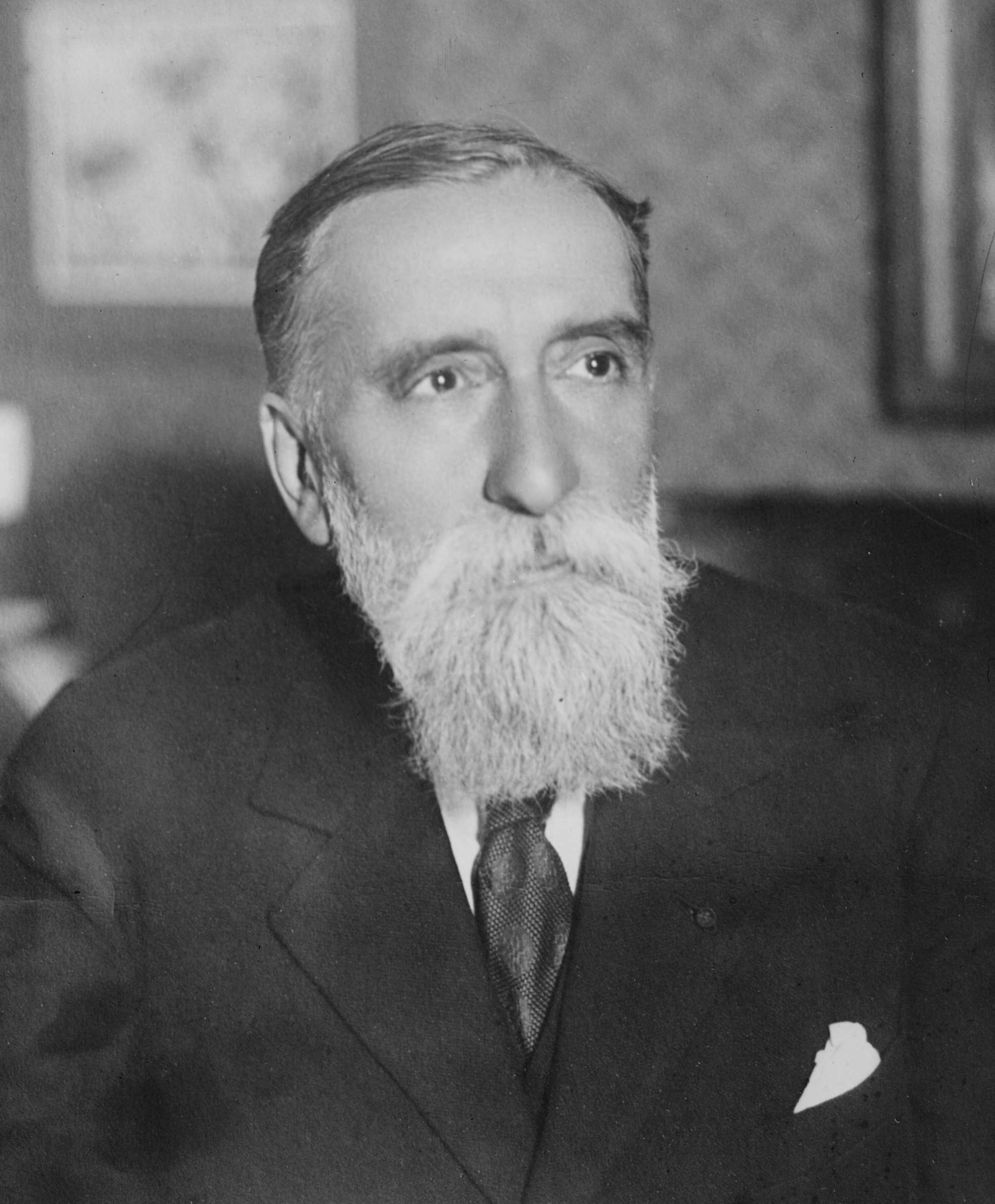
Georges Lecomte

Georges Lecomte (9 July 1867 – 27 August 1958) was a French novelist and playwright, who also wrote literary, historical and artistic studies.

Lecomte was born in Mâcon, Saône-et-Loire. In 1924 he was elected to the Académie française, of which he became perpetual secretary in 1946. He was also director of the École Estienne. In August 1958, at the age of 91, He died at his home at 82 Rue du Ranelagh in the 16th arrondissement in Paris.

== Works ==
=== Plays ===
- La Meule, 4 acts, Paris, Théâtre-Libre, 26 February 1891
- Mirages, 5 acts, Paris, Théâtre-Libre, 6 March 1893

=== Novels ===
- Les Valets, contemporary novel (1898)
- La Suzeraine (1898)
- La Maison en fleurs (1900)
- Les Cartons verts, contemporary novel (1901)
- Le Veau d'or (1903)
- Les Hannetons de Paris (1905)
- L'Espoir (1908)
- Bouffonneries dans la tempête (1921)
- La Lumière retrouvée (1923)
- Le Mort saisit le vif (1925)
- Le Jeune Maître (1929)
- Les Forces d'amour (1931)
- Je n'ai menti qu'à moi-même (1932)
- La Rançon (1941)
- Servitude amoureuse (1949)
- Le Goinfre vaniteux, comic=satirical novel (1951)

=== Other ===
- L'Art impressioniste d'après la collection privée de M. Durand-Ruel (1892)
- Espagne (1896)
- Les Allemands chez eux (1910)
- Les Lettres au service de la patrie (1917)
- Pour celles qui pleurent, pour ceux qui souffrent (1917)
- Clemenceau (1918)
- Au chant de la Marseillaise. Danton et Robespierre. L'Ouragan de la Marseillaise. Marceau et Kléber (1919)
- Louis Charlot (1925)
- La Vie amoureuse de Danton (1927)
- La Vie héroïque et glorieuse de Carpeaux (1928)
- Les Prouesses du Bailli de Suffren (1929)
- Le Gouvernement de M. Thiers (1930)
- Thiers (1933)
- Steinlen. Chats et autres Bêtes. Dessins inédits. Texte de Georges Lecomte (1933)
- Gloire de l'Île-de-France (1934)
- Ma traversée (1949)
