= Charles Cestre =

French academic

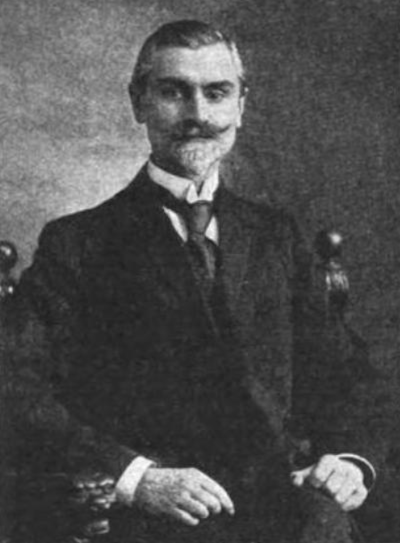
- Charles Cestre, c. 1920
- Born: c. 1871
- Died: November 1958 (aged 87); Saint-Florentin, Yonne
- Children: 1

Academic background
- Education: Harvard University (MA, 1897)

Academic work
- Institutions: University of Bordeaux, Sorbonne University
- Doctoral students: Bernard Faÿ

Charles Cestre (died November 1958) was a French academic who specialised in American literature.

Born in France, Cestre studied at Harvard University in the United States before starting an academic career at various universities including the University of Bordeaux and the Sorbonne. He engaged in several exchange programmes with schools across the United States and the United Kingdom.

Cestre was described by Eric Wollencott Barnes as a "pioneer among serious scholars of American literature".

== Early life and education ==
In 1897, Cestre was an exchange student at Harvard University in the United States. He received a Masters of Arts degree from the school the following year.

== Academic career ==
During the early 20th century, Cestre returned to the United States as a guest lecturer at colleges including Harvard, the University of California, Stanford University, and Columbia University.

During the 1910s, Cestre taught English literature at the University of Bordeaux. In May 1914, he served as an exchange professor at the University of St Andrews in Scotland.

In 1918, Cestre began serving as the chair of American Civilization at the Sorbonne, following the role's creation that year. While there he directed several doctoral theses, including that of Bernard Faÿ. He remained at the Sorbonne until his retirement in 1945.

In 1945, Cestre was elected to be an honorary member of the Modern Language Association of America.

== Writing career ==
In 1930, Cestre wrote a work on Edwin Arlington Robinson titled An Introduction to Edwin Arlington Robinson.

Cestre contributed to The New York Times with a column on French literary affairs.

== Personal life ==
Cestre had at least one child: J. Rist-Cestre. He died at his summer home in Saint-Florentin, Yonne, in November 1958. He was 87 years old.
