= Stéphane Lauzanne =

French journalist and editor of Le Matin

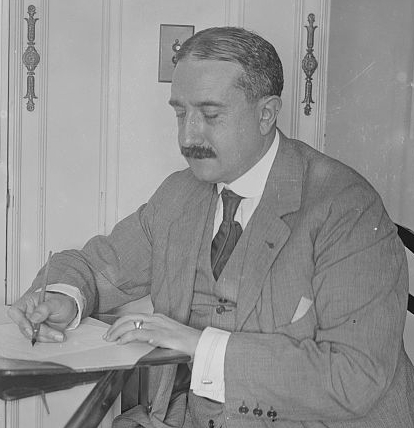
Stéphane Lauzanne

Stéphane Joseph Vincent Lauzanne (22 January 1874 – 22 November 1958) was a French journalist and editor of Le Matin.

During the First World War Lauzanne was a member of the French diplomatic mission to the United States.

On 30 October 1944, following the liberation of France, Lauzanne was sentenced to 20 years' solitary confinement by the Paris Assize Court for intelligence with the enemy.

== Works ==
- Snapshots of America (Paris: Artheme Fayard, unknown).
- At the Bedside of Turkey (Paris: Artheme Fayard, unknown).
- Roadmaps Get Mobilized (Paris: Artheme Fayard, unknown).
- Fighting France (New York: D. Appleton and Company, 1918). Link
- The Men I Saw; Memories of a Journalist (Paris: Artheme Fayard, 1920).
- Great Men and Great Days (New York: D. Appleton and Company, 1921).
