= Seville, Spain (photograph) =

Photograph by Henri Cartier-Bresson

Seville, Spain (1933)

Seville, Spain is a black and white photograph taken by Henri Cartier-Bresson in 1933. He traveled through Spain in 1933, a trip which he documented with many pictures. He took this photograph in Seville, and was one of several that he captured in the same location.

== History and description ==
Cartier-Bresson chose an empty section of a wall, destroyed by a bomb, and aimed his camera at a group of children who joyfully played there. Unlike the other pictures taken at the site, he was careful that the children did not notice that they were being photographed. To achieve pure spontaneity he painted black the shiny parts of his Leica camera.

The picture does have a strong geometric form, influenced by Cubism and Surrealism. It depicts a group of fourteen children, most of who play naturally in the rubble behind a bomb-destroyed wall, from which can be seen other damaged buildings. The destruction itself seems to be a significant testimony of the political turmoil of the Second Spanish Republic. The empty portion of the white, stuccoed wall works as a frame to the scene, from which we can see a smiling child walking with crutches, while several other children engage in playful behaviour. To the left, a boy holds a bucket because he is collecting the rubble that resulted from the destruction. Despite their joyful appearance, the picture seems to represent a political subcontext, which makes sense considering that the Spanish Civil War started only three years later.

Cartier-Bresson would return to Spain after the beginning of the Spanish Civil War and would direct three documentaries on the conflict.

== Public collections ==
There are prints of this photograph at the collections of the Museum Ludwig, in Cologne, the J. Paul Getty Museum, in Los Angeles, the Minneapolis Institute of Art, and the Palmer Museum of Art.
