= Hiram Alfred Cody =

Canadian clergyman and writer

H. A. Cody
- Born: Hiram Alfred Cody; 3 July 1872; Codys, New Brunswick, Canada
- Died: 9 February 1948; Saint John, New Brunswick, Canada
- Occupations: Clergyman, writer

Hiram Alfred "H. A." Cody (3 July 1872 – 9 February 1948) was a Canadian clergyman and novelist. He published 25 books, including a number of bestsellers.

== Books ==
- The Frontiersman: A Tale of the Yukon (1910)
- The Fourth Watch (1911)
- The Long Patrol: A Tale of the Mounted Police (1912)
- The King's Arrow: A Tale of the United Empire Loyalists (1922)
- The Trail Of The Golden Horn (1923)
- The Master Revenge (1924)
