= Ernest Merritt =

American physicist

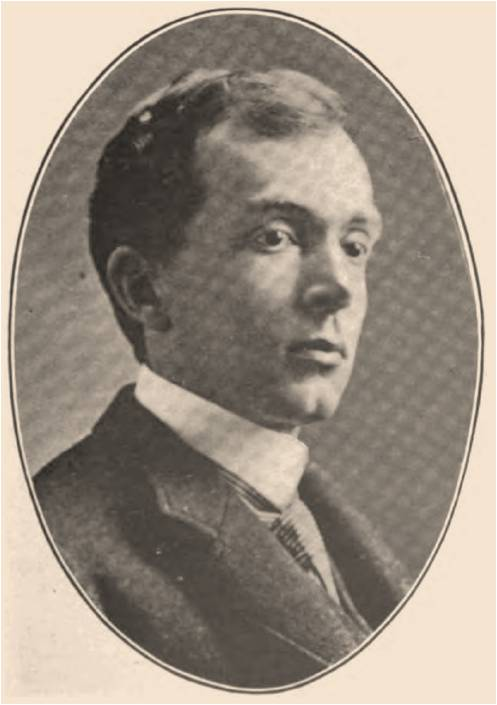
- Born: April 28, 1865; Indianapolis, Indiana
- Died: June 5, 1948 (aged 83); Ithaca, New York
- Education: M.S., Cornell University, 1889
- Occupations: Physicist and Educator

Ernest George Merritt (April 28, 1865 – June 5, 1948) was an American physicist, who served as dean of the graduate school and chair of the Department of Physics at Cornell University.

== Early life and career ==
Merritt was born at Indianapolis, Indiana. After a year at Purdue University he transferred to Cornell University where he took a degree in mechanical engineering. After graduation, he stayed at the university to complete a master's degree in physics. In 1889, he was offered a position at Cornell as an instructor, promoted to assistant professor in 1892. In 1893, studied with Max Planck at Berlin University. He and Planck remained friends and correspondent through to the latter's death. Cornell made him a full professor in 1903 and head of the Physics department in 1919, succeeding his mentor, Edward L. Nichols, as chair. Merritt remained as head of the Cornell Physics Department until retirement in 1935. Merritt and Nichols were co-founders of the journal Physical Review in 1893. The Physical Review was printed and published from Cornell University until the administration of the journal was assumed by the American Physical Society. In 1898, Merritt joined with Professor A. G. Webster, Clark University, and others to create the American Physical Society. Merritt served as its first secretary, and eventually as its president (1914–1916). Merritt also served as secretary of the Physical Sciences Section, American Association for the Advancement of Science. He eventually chaired that section, as well.

== Expertise ==
As a physicist, Merritt is best remembered for the experiments conducted with Edward L. Nichols on the luminescent properties of materials. In their work together over the years Merritt and Nichols were seen almost as a single individual. Merritt also worked in acoustics, electromagnetic oscillations, radio propagation, gaseous discharges, and cathode ray experiments. In the latter, he worked extensively with Harris J. Ryan. With Ryan, he also mentored three generations of Cornell students as members of the Cornell Faculty and the Irving Literary Society. Professor Merritt was also a member of the New York Alpha chapter, Phi Kappa Psi, serving on its corporate board for a half century, and the Irving Literary Society.
