= Muhammad Taha al-Huwayzi =

Iranian-Iraqi poet and teacher

Sheikh Muhammad Taha al-Huwayzi
- محمد طه الحويزي
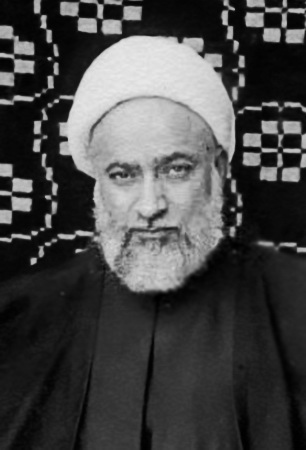
- Al-Huwayzi, 1950s
- Born: 1899; Najaf, Baghdad vilayet, Ottoman Empire
- Died: April 4, 1968 (aged 69); Ahvaz, Imperial State of Iran
- Resting place: Najaf
- Occupations: poet; teacher; islamic jurist
- Writing career
- Language: Arabic
- Years active: 1927-1968

Muhammad Taha al-Huwayzi (Arabic: محمد طه الحويزي, romanized: Muḥammad Ṭāhā al-Ḥuwayzī; 1899 – 4 April 1968) was an Iranian-Iraqi Ja'fari jurist, religious teacher and poet. He was born in Najaf to a father from Al-Huwayza, and studied early education from him, then became a student of Muhammad Husayn Isfahani for a long time. After the death of his father, he moved to Al-Huwayza in 1927, worked in agriculture, then returned to Najaf in 1946, from there to Qom in Iran, where he studied under Hossein Borujerdi, he who entrusted him for his religious educational institute. In Qom, he held a madrasah seminar in which he taught Arabic language and poetry. In his last years, he moved to Ahvaz for Shariah service until his death at the age of 69. Even though he was a Twelver Shia religious teacher in profession, Al-Huwayzi considered one of the most prominent figures of Khuzestani Arabs in Arabic literature, and left behind a collection of poetry and prose letters.

== Biography ==
His full nasab is Muhammad Taha bin Nasrallah bin al-Hussein bin Nasrallah bin Abbas bin Muhamamd bin Karamallah bin Muhammad Hasan bin Habib bin Farjallah bin Muhammad bin Darwish bin Muhammad bin Hussein bin Jamal al-Din bin Akbar, al-Karami al-Khaffaji al-Huwayzi. He was born in 1899 Najaf, Karbala Sanjak, Baghdad vilayet, to an Arab family from Al-Huwayza, capital of Musha'sha'iyan Emirate. He studied early education of literature under his father, Nasrallah (1874 - 1927), then attended the classes of Abd al-Rasoul Al-Jawahiri and Muhammad Hossein Gharavi and followed him for a long time. Learned Arabic prosody from Qasim Muhyi ad-Din.

He continued his studies until he counted as one of ulema of Najaf, also referred as ustad for his knowledge of Arabic literature. He taught, researched and wrote some works of Ja'fari jurisprudence, among his students are: Muhammad Reda Al-Mudhaffar, Muhammad Taher Radhi, Ali Fadlallah, Muhammad Husayn Al-Sabri, Muhammad Rida Sharaf Al-Din, Mahdi Al-Khudari, Muhammad Jawad Al-Sahlani, and his son Muhammad Al-Karmi al-Huwayzi. He left Najaf to Al-Huwayza in 1927 and worked in agriculture on his family's lands. As his financial condition stabilized, he returned to Najaf in 1946 and from there to Karbala and finally settled in Qom. There, he studied with Husayn al-Husayni al-Kukhamari and Hossein Borujerdi. He also taught in Qom and became famous for his teaching method.

In his final year, Al-Huwayzi returned to his hometown and replaced his father in Sharia duties for fifteen years until he died on 4 April 1968 in Ahwaz. His body was transferred to Najaf and buried with his father in their family cemetery in Amarah neighborhood.

== Poetry ==
Al-Huwayzi considered one of the prominent Iranian Arab religious poets during the mid-20th century. Also known for his sense of humour, he was good at joking and improvisation, inventing his jokes as poetry. The dictionary Al-Babtain of Contemporary Arab Poets described his poetry as follows:

He maintained traditional purposes; wrote poetry to congratulate his friends and elders on various occasions, and praise (madḥ) of Imam Ali, Musa al-Kadhim and Muhammad al-Jawad... His madḥ included advice and preaching. He also wrote long sentimental poetry characterized by the tenderness of expression, the presence of the image, and the softness of the expression... Among these are his two poems The Breath of the Spirit and The Radiance of the Soul which both contained mystical glimpses and philosophical meanings. He also wrote ghazal and muwashshah. His poems were distinguished by the accuracy of expression, the eloquence and the strength of the structure. And he was also interested in some of the poetic techniques (badīʿ).

== Works ==
Al-Huwayzi left behind some handwritten works, a poetry collection, prose letters, a book in fiqh titled Tā'liqāt fī mustafīḍah al-fiqh wa-al-uṣūl (Arabic: تعليقات مستفيضة في الفقه والأصول) and Kitāb-al-muṭawwal fī ʻilm al-maʻānī wa-al-bayān (Arabic: كتاب المطول في علم المعاني والبيان) on Arabic rhetoric.
