= Franco Vittadini =

Italian composer (1884–1948)

Franco Vittadini (9 April 1884 in Pavia – 30 November 1948 in Pavia) was an Italian composer and conductor. As a composer, he is mostly known for his operas and sacred music.

Born in Pavia, he began his musical studies in 1903 at the Milan Conservatory, but left prematurely because of a disagreement with the director, Giuseppe Gallignani. For a short period he was maestro di cappella and organist in Varese, thereafter spending the rest of his life in Pavia, where he was the director of the Istituto Musicale from 1924 until his death.

As a stage composer, Vittadini found his greatest success with the opera Anima allegra (1918 - 1919), performed abroad as well as in Italy. His ballet Vecchia Milano (1928) was also very successful. Vittadini considered his opera Caracciolo (1938) to be his finest work, but his opera Fiammetta e l'avaro (1942 - 1951) was more successful at winning audiences.

Vittadini received attention outside the theatre for his religious works. He wrote numerous masses and motets in a style very similar to that of Lorenzo Perosi. His oratorio L'agonia del Redentore (1933) is considered to be one of his finer works, and his religious drama Nazareth (1925) forms a bridge between his achievements within sacred compositions and dramatic works.

== Operas ==
- Il mare di Tiberiade (1914)
- Anima allegra (1918–19)
- Nazareth (1925)
- La Sagredo (1930)
- Il natale di Gesù (1933)
- Caracciolo (1938)
- Fiammetta e l'avaro (1942)

== Sources ==
- Opera Glass
- John C.G. Waterhouse. The New Grove Dictionary of Opera, edited by Stanley Sadie (1992). ISBN 0-333-73432-7 and ISBN 1-56159-228-5
