= Karl Zuchardt =

German writer (1887–1968)

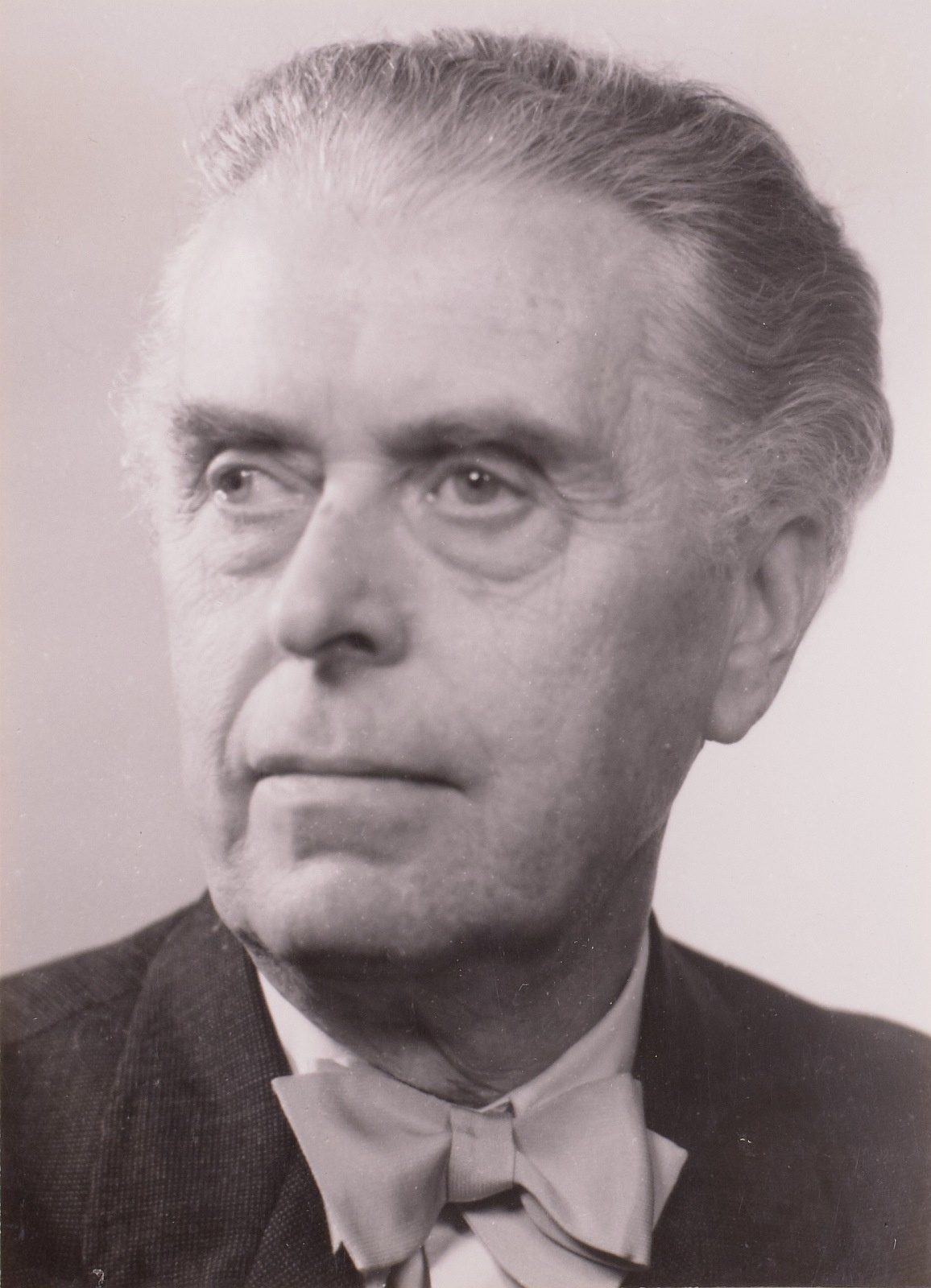
Zuchardt in Berlin, 1956

Karl Zuchardt (10 February 1887 – 12 November 1968) was a German writer of historical novels.

Zuchardt was born in Leipzig, Kingdom of Saxony. In 1961 he received the Martin Andersen Nexø Arts Award from the city of Dresden, where he later died.

Books by Zuchardt include Der Spiessrutenlauf, Stirb Du Narr! (an account of Sir Thomas More's political life), and Wie lange noch Bonaparte?
