= List of compositions by José Vianna da Motta =

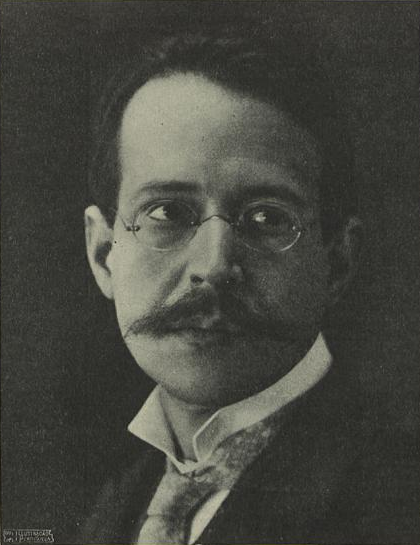
Photograph of Vianna da Motta from the magazine O Occidente, 1911

This is a list of compositions by José Vianna da Motta.

== Piano (solo) ==
- Barcarola, Op. 1/1
- Barcarola, Op. 1/2
- Fantasiestücke, Op. 2
- 3 Scenas Portugezas, Op. 9/1: Cantiga d’Amor
- 3 Scenas Portugezas, Op. 9/2: Chula
- 3 Scenas Portugezas, Op. 9/3: Valsa Caprichosa
- Vito, Op. 11
- Adeus, minha terra, Op. 15/2
- Ballada, Op. 16
- Barcarola #2, Op. 17
- 3 Improvisos, Op. 18
- Piano Sonata in D Major
- Cenas portuguesas
- ‘Invocation of the Lusiads’ for piano solo
- Romance
- Two Romances
- Dramatic Fantasy
- Five Portuguese Rhapsodies
- Waltz
- Serenada
- Capriccio
- Meditação

== Chamber music ==
=== Violin and Piano ===
- Violin Sonata

=== Piano Trio ===
- Piano Trio

=== String Quartet ===
- String Quartet in C Minor
- String Quartet
- Andante for String Quartet
- Variações for String Quartet
- Cenas nas Montanhas for String Quartet

=== Other ===
- Violin Sonata (with Piano four-hands)

== Orchestral ==
=== Symphonies ===
- Symphony ‘À Pátria’, Op. 13

=== Symphonic Poems ===
- Dona Inês de Castro Overture
- Die Lusiaden for Orchestra and Chorus

=== Piano and Orchestra ===
- Piano Concerto in A Major
- Fantasia Dramatica for Piano and Orchestra

== Choral Music ==
- Os Lusiadas’ for Piano and Choir
- Ave Maria for Female choir and string orchestra

== Lieder ==
- Op. 3
  - Das Bächlein
  - Frühlingsregen (Ludwig August Frankl)
  - Sonntag (Joseph Freiherr von Eichendorff)
- Op. 4
  - Wiegenlied (Wilhelm Raabe)
- Op. 5
  - Gefunden (Johann Wolfgang von Goethe)
  - Entschluß (Ludwig Uhland)
  - Gute Nacht (Adele Schaeffer)
  - Tanzlied (Wilhelm Müller)
  - Hier an der Bergeshalde (Theodor Storm)
- Op. 8
  - Im Volkston (Wilhelm Raabe)
  - Über den Wolken (Wilhelm Raabe)
  - Die Jungfrau im Walde (Wilhelm Raabe)
  - In der Dämmerung (Wilhelm Raabe)
- Op. 10
  - Abschied (Peter Cornelius)
  - Guter Rat (Peter Cornelius)
  - Erfüllung (Peter Cornelius)
  - Ländlicher Reigen (Peter Cornelius)
- Op. 13
  - Danke! (Peter Cornelius)
  - Umflort, Gehüllt in Trauern (Peter Cornelius)
  - Laß Mich Deine Augen Fragen (Peter Cornelius)
- Op. 15
  - Johannistag (Wilhelm Raabe)
  - Das Lied von Falkensteiner (Wilhelm Raabe)
  - Eine Briefelein (Wilhelm Raabe)
  - Monikas Traum (Wilhelm Raabe)
- Die Spröde (Johann Wolfgang von Goethe)
- Olhos Negros (Almeida Garrett)
- A Estrela (Almeida Garrett)
- Cancão Perdida (Guerra Junqueiro)
- Lavadeira e Caçador (João de Deus)
- A Luz (João de Deus)
- Cantar dos Búzios (Afonso Lopes Vieira)
- Verdes São as Hortas (Luís de Camões)
