= Rachel (play) =

1916 play by Angelina Weld Grimké

Rachel is a play that was written in 1916 by African American teacher, playwright and poet Angelina Weld Grimké (February 27, 1880 – June 10, 1958). Grimké submitted the play to the Drama Committee of the National Association for the Advancement of Colored People (NAACP). For the first production of the play the program read: "This is the first attempt to use the stage for race propaganda in order to enlighten the American people relative to the lamentable condition of the millions of Colored citizens in this free republic."

== Characters ==
- Mrs Mary Loving, a widow
- Rachel Loving, her daughter
- Thomas Loving, her son
- Jimmy Mason, a small boy
- John Strong, a friend of the family
- Mrs. Lane, a caller
- Ethel Lane, her daughter
- Mary
- Nancy
- Edith
- Jenny
- Louise
- Martha
- little friends of Rachel

== Plot summary ==
Originally titled Blessed are the Barren, this three-act play depicts an educated, sensitive young woman who comes to understanding of the realities of American racism. Eventually she experiences acute melancholia because of this new understanding. In Act One it is clear that her love for children inspires a deep desire to someday carry her own. She proceeds to fill her mother's house with little brown and black children, whom she lovingly tends. Her mother reveals to her and her brother the fact that their father and another brother were lynched 10 years earlier. In the Acts that follow, Rachel learns of the racism the young children she loves have been made to endure in their school and resolves to never have children. In so doing, she must ultimately reject the love of her brother's friend John Strong, the man she loves.

== Production history ==
Rachel was first performed at Myrtilla Miner Normal School (a teacher's college) in Washington, DC., by the National Guy Players under the auspices of the National Association for the Advancement of Colored People. From its status as a work in progress years earlier through this production, Grimké received guidance from John Garrett Underhill, a white New York critic, playwright, producer and member of the Board of Directors of the NAACP. The production ran from March 3, 1916 to March 4, 1916.

Approximately a year later, the play was restaged at the experimental and community theater the Neighborhood Playhouse on the Lower East Side of New York. The New York production maintained most of the actors from the D.C. production. Lillian Wald, head of the Henry Street Settlement, worked with Mary White Ovington, one of the founders of the NAACP, to bring this production of Rachel to the Neighborhood Playhouse in 1917. It was the first time a theater in the United States presented a play by a black author with a black cast before an integrated audience. (Lillian D.Wald, Progressive Activist, edited by Clare Coss, The Feminist Press at the City University of New York, 1989, pp 11–12) It opened on April 25, 1917.

One month later, May 24, 1917, at the urging of Maud Cuney Hare, the prominent musician, writer, and daughter of the black leader, Norris Wright Cuney, the play was performed in Cambridge, Massachusetts, at Brattle Hall, the auditorium of the Cambridge Social Union. A local church, Saint Bartholomew's Episcopal Church, sponsored the performance, given by amateur actors.

In 1924, The Colored Branch of YMCA staged Rachel in New Castle, Pennsylvania.

Rachel was produced by Spelman College's Department of Drama and Dance in Atlanta, GA, in 1991. It was directed and adapted by Tisch Jones.

Rachel received its European premiere at the Finborough Theatre, London, in 2014, directed by Ola Ince, with a cast featuring Adelayo Adedayo in the titular lead, and Miquel Brown, Sheila Atim and Nakay Kpaka supporting.

Rachel was produced by the Theater Ensemble of Color in Portland, Maine, in 2018.

Rachel was produced by Quintessence Theatre in Philadelphia, Pennsylvania, in 2020.

== Critiques ==
Patricia R. Schroeder argued that like Mary Burrill, Angelina Weld Grimké's anti-lynching drama relied upon naturalistic settings, vernacular language in the hopes "to use realism's mimetic power to question stereotypes and illustrate social injustice". Similarly, Judith L. Stephens has argued that the recourse to realism in anti-lynching plays illustrated the graphic nature of the act and its pervasive influence in everyday life. Will Harris offers an interpretation of Grimké's realism highlighting its move towards a liberative racial and sexual politics: "While dramatizing the plight of their race, as a means of both raising a black racial consciousness and appealing to a possible white audience, early black women playwrights also formulated dramatic strategies which enabled them to stage substantive, independent African American female presences, and thus propose their sexual equality."

While some critics focus on the realism in Grimké's play, other find the extreme sentimentality more akin to the genre of melodrama. Grimké's biographer Gloria T. Hull notes that Rachel comes across as extreme and thus "too sensitive, too good, too sweet––almost saccharine."

David Krasner published a critical reading of Rachel by way of Walter Benjamin in his book on the Harlem Renaissance, A Beautiful Pageant. In it he argues that Rachel is neither realistic nor symbolic, and in its sentimentality both mourning and allegory pervade. The play exceeds realism and relies upon allegory because in its ambiguities and contradictions, "allegory has the power to express the amorphous aesthetic of lynching's effect on a sensitive and overwrought character".

== Apparent themes and their portrayal ==
Set in a domestic setting, and appealing to the "idealized motherhood" of the time, Grimke's Rachel attempted to "reach the conscience of white women". Grimke's focus on motherhood, deeply influenced by her own lack of a mother figure, is perhaps one of the most powerful elements of Rachel. Setting her play in the black home, Grimke gives her female characters a "virtuous womanhood", notably absent in previous stage portrayals of black women. Grimke also emphasizes the "honorable manhood" of black men in her work, giving way to more dignified portrayals of black men on stage. Grimke humanizes African-Americans with her domestic setting and by portraying both men and women in a way that creates a positive image of black family life. One of the most prevalent themes in Rachel is preserving the innocence of young children. Early childhood is unbiased of racial stigma because it is a learning and developmental period. Though children are constantly being affected by their society, they have yet to make distinct choices about themselves and those around them. This gives them a purity that is extremely noticeable, especially in the midst of lynching and racism. Rachel takes on a motherly role for many of the children in her community, and they naturally flock to her loving behavior. Rachel admits that for some reason in regard to black babies, she feels "more than other babies, [she] must protect them. They're in danger, but from what?". Rachel is not initially fully aware of the growing racism around her. This mother figure shares some of the same naivety of the young children she feels she must protect. However, though Rachel cannot quite pinpoint why she feels uneasy for the children, she knows that something is wrong. Her fears become more realized when she discovers that her friend, Mary, does not want to be seen with her because Rachel is black. This is a clear point at which the innocence of childhood begins to crack. Rachel is around nineteen years old in the first act of the play; she is at an age when social pressure heavily influences people.
