= Margaret Duley =

Canadian novelist (1894–1968)

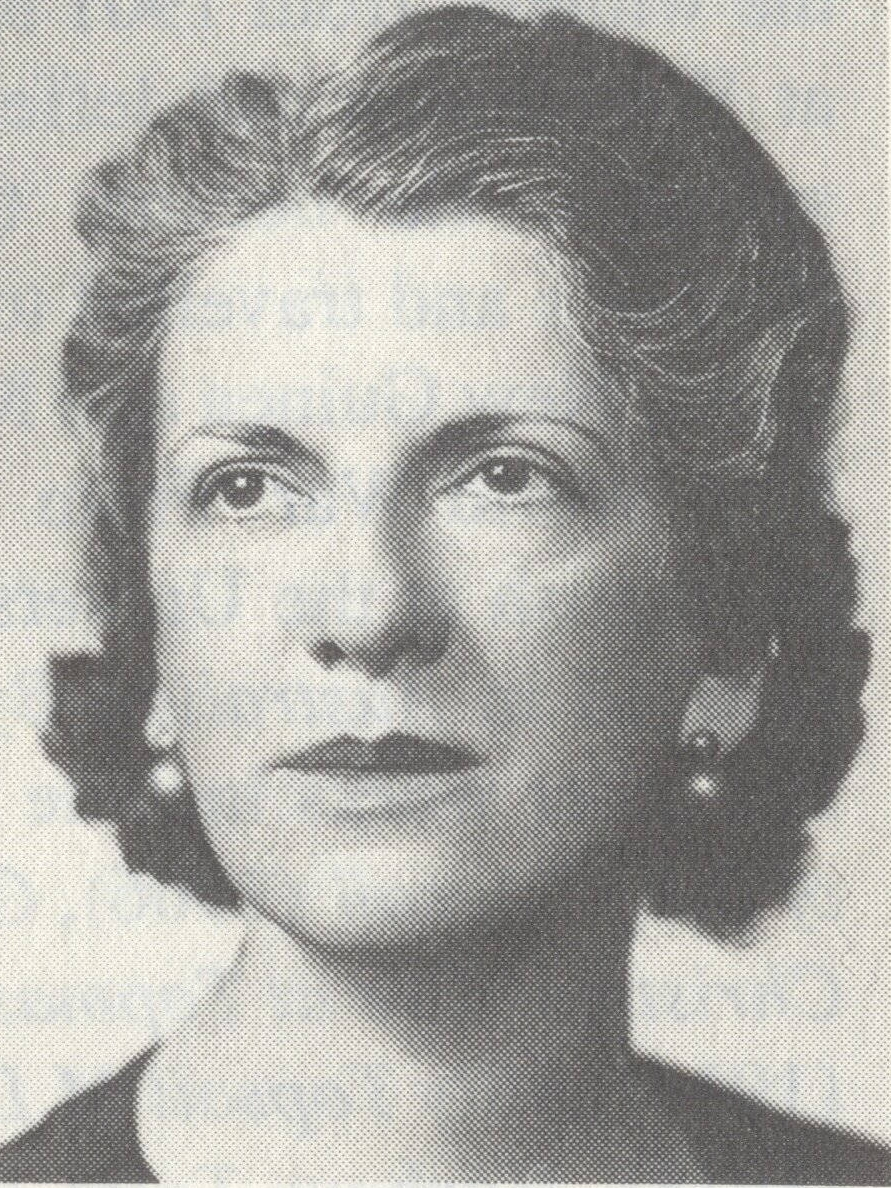
- Born: Margaret Iris Duley; September 27, 1894; St. John's, Newfoundland Colony
- Died: March 22, 1968 (aged 73); St. John's, Newfoundland, Canada
- Occupation: Author

Margaret Iris Duley (September 27, 1894 – March 22, 1968) was a Canadian writer and author from Newfoundland. Born in pre-Confederation Newfoundland, she was arguably the province's first novelist and certainly the first to gain an international audience. Her four novels combine a deep sense of geography and place, and especially of the sea. Her main characters are often outport women who are set apart or restive in their surroundings, and her writing reflected a feminist sensibility.

== Early life and education ==
Duley was born in St. John's, Newfoundland as the daughter of Thomas Duley, who had emigrated from Birmingham, England, and Tryphena Soper from Carbonear, Newfoundland. Thomas Duley was the owner of a successful optical, jewelry and luxury goods store on Water Street. In 1910, Margaret Duley graduated from the Methodist College in St. John's, and shortly after in 1911 she and her family visited England for an aunt's wedding. She subsequently decided to study elocution and drama at the London Academy of Music and Dramatic Art, but because of World War I she had to move home.

== Later life and activism ==
Two of Duley's three brothers served in World War I, and Duley herself worked at the Women's Patriotic Association (WPA), an organization that raised money and supplies for the Royal Newfoundland Regiment. Her oldest brother, Captain Cyril C. Duley, MBE, was badly wounded during the war, and her younger brother, 2nd Lt. Lionel Duley, was killed shortly before the Armistice. She would later write a short story titled "Mother Boggan," one of the few written by a Newfoundland author that reflected critically about the conflagration that left so many of Newfoundland's young men dead or wounded.

In 1920, Duley's father died and left her an estate of $250 a year, allowing her to live at home. She joined the Ladies Reading Room and the Current Events Club, a center of advanced opinion that produced many of the leaders of the Newfoundland women's suffrage movement, as did the WPA. She was a supporter of the Women's Franchise League, whose island-wide petition campaign resulted in the passage of women's suffrage in March 1925, allowing women to vote at 25, men at 21.

Duley worked for the Women's Patriotic Association and the St. John's Ambulance Corporation for World War II. Afterwards, she became a Public Relations Officer for the Red Cross and began writing newspaper columns. After many interviews and broadcast talks on radio station CJON, Duley went to England in 1953 to broadcast four stories on the coronation of Queen Elizabeth II.

In 1955, Duley's health started to decline because of Parkinson's disease. By 1959, the disease left her unable even to write letters. She then lived with her sister-in-law and niece, who cared for her until 1968. She died aged 73 at St. Luke's Home in St. John's.

A Parks Canada historic plaque to Duley's memory is attached near the entrance to the Queen Elizabeth II Library on the campus of Memorial University in St. John's. Her home at 51 Rennies Mill Road is part of the Women's History Walking Tour of St. John's. In September 2007, Parks Canada designated Duley a Person of National Historic Significance.

== Written works ==
In 1928, when Duley and her brother Cyril took a boat trip to the coast of Labrador, Dudley encountered a seagull which hovered in front of her face with eyes like "yellow ice." She used this fierce, yellow-eyed image in her first book titled The Eyes of the Gull (1936) and described the theme as a "symbol of a piteous heart of the north." The novel follows a 30-year-old woman who wants freedom from her outport life and a dictating mother.

Duley's second novel, Cold Pastoral (1939), is said to be influenced by the case of a real missing child lost in the woods. Reflecting her own life, the book features an orphaned girl who is adopted by an upper-class family in St. John's. The authenticity of the lifestyles of outport life and the poverty of depression-era Newfoundland resonated in the United States and Britain, but received a lukewarm reception in her hometown.

Her next novel, Highway to Valour (1941), is set against the backdrop of the devastating tidal wave that struck the Burin Peninsula in 1929, and the subsequent life of the young heroine, Mageila, in St. John's. Novelty on Earth (1942), set in a British colony, is a thinly veiled depiction of life among the so-called "mannered set" in St. John's.

Duley drew upon her experiences as a volunteer at the Caribou Hut, a hostel for servicemen who flooded into the port of St. John's during World War II, for her final major work The Caribou Hut (1949). A history of the hostel, The Caribou Hut depicts the turbulence and excitement of wartime St. John's, as well as the activities at the hostel that entertained, fed and housed approximately 16,000 soldiers by 1946. A short story called Sea Dust (1943), which features a ship's cat rescued from the beaches of Dunkirk, also stems from this period.

== Bibliography ==
- A Pair of Grey Socks: Facts and Fancies by Tryphena Soper Duley; Verses by Margaret Duley, 1916 (St. John's, Newfoundland: n. publ.) at A Celebration of Women Writers
- The Eyes of the Gull, 1936 (Arthur Baker Limited of London)
- Cold Pastoral, 1939 (London: Hutchinson and Company)
- Highway to Valour, 1941 (Toronto and London: Macmillan Company), 1943 (London: Methuen and Company)
- Novelty on Earth, 1943 (Toronto and London: Macmillan Company), 1944 (Britain: Methuen)
- The Caribou Hut, 1949 (Toronto: Ryerson Press)
- Mother Boggan. (The Fortnightly, April 1940)
- Sea Dust. (Chatelaine, November 1943)
