= Nelle Scanlan =

New Zealand journalist and novelist

Nelle Scanlan MBE
- Born: Ellen Margaret Scanlan; 15 January 1882; Picton, New Zealand
- Died: 5 October 1968 (aged 86); Wellington, New Zealand
- Known for: Best-selling New Zealand novelist in the 1930s

Ellen Margaret Scanlan MBE (15 January 1882 – 5 October 1968) was a New Zealand journalist and novelist. Her most famous novels were the Pencarrow series of four novels, published between 1932 and 1939.

== Early life ==
Scanlan was born in Picton, New Zealand, in 1882, one of the three children of Michael and Ellen (née Kiely) Scanlan. The family later moved to Blenheim and Scanlan attended the convent school there.

== Career and professional life ==
Scanlan started her working life as a secretary in Palmerston North and later set up her own typing business there. She also wrote articles for the Manawatu Times newspaper and when the journalists enlisted for World War I, she was invited to join the staff.

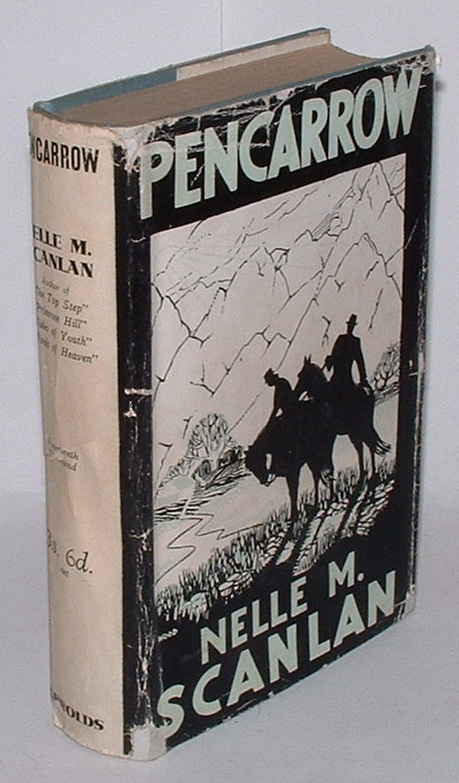
Copy of Pencarrow, a novel written by Nelle Scanlan, published in 1932

In 1921 she attended the Arms Limitation Conference in Washington, D.C. - the only New Zealand journalist there and the only woman.

From 1923 to 1948 she lived in England, writing fiction and freelancing as a journalist. Her reports covered the lives of royalty and celebrities, and the people and places behind the major political events in Europe at the time. She travelled back to New Zealand about every five years. Her publisher, Jarrolds Publishing suggested she write a novel about New Zealand and Scanlan began the series known as the Pencarrow quartet. Pencarrow was published in 1932, followed by Tides of Youth (1933), Winds of Heaven (1934) and Kelly Pencarrow(1939). The novels were republished a number of times during the 1940s and 1950s and their popularity led to her place as the most popular New Zealand novelist of her generation.

In 1948 Scanlan returned to live in New Zealand and continued to write fiction. Her last book was published in 1952, The Young Summer. Her autobiography, Road to Pencarrow, was published in 1963.

Scanlan was appointed a Member of the Order of the British Empire in the 1965 Queen's Birthday Honours, for services to journalism and New Zealand writing. Scanlan died of a heart attack in Wellington in 1968, aged 86, and was buried at Terrace End Cemetery in Palmerston North.
