= Charles Grant Robertson =

British academic historian (1869–1948)

Sir Charles Grant Robertson CVO (1869 – 29 February 1948) was a British academic historian. He was a Fellow of All Souls College, Oxford, and Vice-chancellor of the University of Birmingham.

== Biography ==
Grant Robertson was born in 1869 and educated at Highgate School and Hertford College, Oxford. He was elected a fellow of All Souls College, Oxford in 1893. At Oxford he became a distinguished and influential historian. He was one-time tutor to Edward, Prince of Wales, and had many academic publications to his name. He also published a light work called "Voces academicae, short scenes of student life in Oxford" in 1898 and produced a series of romantic novels under the pseudonym Wymond Carey between 1902 and 1907.

In 1920 Grant Robertson became Vice-Chancellor of Birmingham University. He is credited with doing much to raise the profile of the young university, with strong support for the new medical school, the library and the Barber Institute and one of his first tasks was to set up a Joint Standing Committee on Research With regard to the library, he declared "A library is not a luxury, nor an ornamental appendage, but an absolute necessity…". The Charles Grant Robertson Scholarship at Birmingham University is awarded for research in the Department of English, and is open only to existing students of the university.

Grant Robertson was Chairman of the Committee of Vice-Chancellors and Principals of the Universities of the United Kingdom (CVCP), later Universities UK from 1929 to 1935. He was president of the Johnson Society at Lichfield from 1939 to 1944

In spite of his racy early writings, Grant Robertson was a rather aloof and prudish bachelor. He was particularly recalled as wordy, one commentator observing that he "never used a single word to express himself, if a paragraph could more gracefully define his meaning". Staff and students recalled incidents such as when his opening speech at a charity function was so long it dramatically reduced the takings, or when students we invited to tea but never had the chance to eat it. Harry Hodson recalled he was "a teacher by nature, and would lecture copiously among his contemporaries and juniors, little heeding if their attention wandered, raising the question, 'Can an interesting man be a bore?' But he was well worth listening to, for his mind was sharp, his opinions vigorous and his knowledge vast."

== Publications ==
=== Academic works ===
- England under the Hanoverians (1911). online
- Bismarck 1918
- An historical atlas of modern Europe from 1789 to 1922 with an historical and explanatory text 1924
- Religion and The Totalitarian State. The Social Service Lecture 1937
- Centenary Of Charter Of Incorporation. A Short History Of Birmingham From Its Origin to the Present Day 1938 with Conrad
- The British Universities 1944
- Chatham and the British Empire 1946 online
- Evolution of Prussia 1946 with Sir J. A. R. Marriott
- Bolingbroke 1947
- Select Statutes Cases and Documents to Illustrate English Constitutional History, 1660 – 1832 1949

=== As Wymond Carey ===
- Monsieur Martin
- For the white rose
- No 101 and Love
- The Judge

Academic offices
Preceded by Sir Oliver Lodge	Vice-Chancellor of the University of Birmingham; 1920–1938	Succeeded by Raymond Priestley
