= Seth Hoffman =

Samuel S. Hoffman (September 8, 1895 – August 2, 1948) was a twentieth-century American artist, most noted for his black & white monotypes.

A native of Philadelphia, Hoffman studied at Pennsylvania Academy of the Fine Arts (1914-1920) with Philip Hale, Emil Carlsen, Daniel Garber, Charles Grafly, and Henry McCarter, and at the Ecole des Beaux-Arts, Paris. Hoffman moved to New York, where he became a member of the Woodstock Artists Association and taught art at the International Ladies' Garment Workers' Union, Locals 22 and 91, in New York City.

By profession painter, etcher, and teacher, his work was exhibited at Pepsi-Cola, 1945; National Academy of Design, 1940; solo shows: Macbeth (Feb. & Nov. 1930, Feb. 1932), Grand Central (1935), Milch Galleries, NY; Casson Gallery, Boston; O'Brien Gallery, Chicago; Tilden & Thurber Gallery, Providence; Milwaukee Art Institute; Detroit Institute of Arts; Grand Rapids Art Gallery; Westchester Center, White Plains, NY. As a WPA artist, Hoffman was commissioned to create a series of monotypes set in Westchester for the county's offices and libraries, which he completed in 1934.

Father: Sam Hofman Mother: Rijk hofman

Hoffman's monotypes can be found in the permanent collections of Addison Gallery of American Art at Phillips Academy, Andover, MA; Springville Museum of Art, Springville City, UT; the Herbert F. Johnson Museum of Art at Cornell University, Ithaca, NY; Smithsonian American Art Museum, Washington, D.C.; and National Gallery of Art Washington, D.C.; as well as in the currently touring Sigmund R. Balka Collection of the Hebrew Union College-Jewish Institute of Religion Museum, New York, NY. Two oil paintings are in the Nazario Renzoni & Vilma Valencia collection in Florence, Italy.

Hoffman was born on the 8th of September in 1895 in Philadelphia. He was married in Philadelphia in 1920 to Molly Gaylburd, known also as Marie "Molly" Gilbert, and they had one son, Henry G. Hoffman, born in Philadelphia in 1927. In New York, Hoffman lived in Lake Mohegan, Westchester (1935); Peekskill, Westchester (1940); and New York City. He died after a long illness on the 2nd of August in 1948 in Mount Sinai Hospital, New York City, at the age of 52.

== Other sources ==
- Pittsburgh Jewish Chronicle "Balka exhibit reflects Jewish life in 19th-, 20th-century America" by Hilary Daninhirsch, January 23, 2013, 4:18 pm
- Pittsburgh Post-Gazette "Collector searches for Jewish aesthetic in art" by Mary Thomas, February 20, 2013, 5:00 am
- The Painterly Print: Monotypes from the Seventeenth to the Twentieth Century, Metropolitan Museum of Art, 1980. ISBN 9780870992230
- Guide to the ILGWU. David Dubinsky Memorabilia.(1942. Collection Number: 5780/179 MB) Kheel Center for Labor-Management Documentation and Archives Cornell University Library: "David Dubinsky," charcoal drawing by Seth Hoffman, 1942
- Kunst und Politik/Art and Labor edited by Frances Pohl, V&R unipress GmbH, 2005, "Art, Education and Labor: The Metropolitan Museum's Workers' Education Program," p.62 ISBN 3899712021
- Ancestry.com Seth Hoffman (1895 - 1948)
- Monotypes in black and white by Seth Hoffman; Nov. 4-25, 1930; Macbeth Gallery Exhibition Catalog
- The New York Times, "Seth Hoffman Shows His Monotypes at Macbeth Gallery-Exhibition of Modern European Work" by Edward Alden Jewell, K.G.S., February 25, 1932, Section ART BOOKS, Page 19
- The New York Times, "EXHIBITIONS THIS WEEK; Sculpture Through Ages--Lilian Prentiss, Prendergast, Hoffman and Others" by Ruth Green Harris, November 09, 1930, Section Arts & Leisure, Page X12
- The New York Times "UNION GROUP GIVES EXHIBITION OF ART; Members of the Dressmakers' Local 22 Submit a Variety of Work at Ferargil's SHOW TO AID CHINA RELIEF Mayor Expected to Auction a Painting at Opening Today -- Other Leaders to Attend" by Edward Alden Jewell; October 20, 1942, Page 22
- The New York Times "Five Exhibitions Open." September 2, 1932 - SOCIAL NEWS ART
- The New York Times "GARMENT WORKERS HOLDING ART SHOW; Local 91 of Union Presents Work of 75 Painters at the American British Center" May 15, 1945 - SOCIAL NEWS ART
- The New York Times "ACTIVITIES HERE AND OUT OF TOWN" September 4, 1932 - DRAMA SCREEN HOTELS AND RESTAURANTS MUSIC FASHIONS ART SHOPPERS COLUMNS THE DANCE
- The New York Times "NEWS OF ART" August 17, 1938 - DRAMA SCREEN HOTELS AND RESTAURANTS MUSIC FASHIONS ART SHOPPERS COLUMNS THE DANCE
- The New York Times December 12, 1940 - Books - Article - Print Headline: "Art Notes"
- The New York Times September 11, 1932 - DRAMA SCREEN HOTELS AND RESTAURANTS MUSIC FASHIONS ART SHOPPERS COLUMNS THE DANCE - Article - Print Headline: "Exhibitions Recently Opened Here"
- The New York Times October 17, 1942 - OBITUARIES - Article - Print Headline: "Art Notes"
- The New York Times August 14, 1932 - SPECIAL FEATURES ART AUTOMOBILES AVIATION EDUCATION SCIENCE RESORTS TRAVEL STEAMSHIPS - Article - Print Headline: "CURRENT SHOWS IN AND ABOUT NEW YORK"
- The New York Times February 15, 1932 - By EDWARD ALDEN JEWELL. - BOOKS ART - Article - Print Headline: "A Deluge of Art Exhibitions"
- The New York Times, December 24, 1934 - RADIO-ART-BOOKS - Article - Print Headline: "Hoffman Works to Be Shown"
- The New York Times, March 14, 1937 - By HOWARD DEVREE - Arts & Leisure - Article - Print Headline: "A REVIEWER'S NOTEBOOK: NEW SHOWS; Brief Comment on Some of the Recently Opened Exhibitions-- Solo Flights and Group Events--Other Art News" (Retrospective at Grand Central Gallery)
- The New York Times November 10, 1937 - By EDWARD ALDEN JEWELL - DRAMA MUSIC SOCIETY HOTELS AND RESTAURANTS SCREEN ART RADIO SHOPPERS COLUMNS THE DANCE - Article - Article - Print Headline: "FRANS HALS SHOW OPENED TO PUBLIC; Fortnight Stay at Schaeffer Gallery Brings a Group of Outstanding Portraits"
- The New York Times December 10, 1944 - By HOWARD DEVREE - 100 NEEDIEST CASES - Article - Print Headline: "AMONG THE NEW EXHIBITIONS" (Hoffman's Students)
- The New York Times August 21, 1938 - By HOWARD DEVREE - DRAMA, SCREEN, MUSIC, DANCE, ART, RADIO - Article - Print Headline: "AMERICANS AT THE FAIR; Clearing Ground for the Comprehensive Exhibition of Contemporary Work" (World's Fair 1939)
- The New York Times February 28, 1932 - DRAMA MUSIC SOCIETY HOTELS AND RESTAURANTS SCREEN ART RADIO SHOPPERS COLUMNS THE DANCE - Article - Print Headline: "THE WEEK: RECENTLY OPENED SHOWS" (Macbeth Gallery, 1932)
- Normal Raquette, Potsdam, NY, Dec. 13, 1940: "Charcoal Drawings in Museum" One-man print show exhibiting charcoal drawing and monotype at New York State Normal School at Potsdam
- Who Was Who in American Art: 1564-1975, Falk, Peter Hastings (editor), Sound View Press, 1999, Vol. 1., p. 252. ISBN 9780932087577
- Google Books:New Deal for Art: The Government Art Projects of the 1930s With Examples from New York City & State, Marlene Park, Gerald E. Markowitz, Gallery Association of New York State, 1977, p.90
- Specific Object/David Platzker:New Deal for Art: The Government Art Projects of the 1930s With Examples from New York City & State, Marlene Park, Gerald E. Markowitz, Gallery Association of New York State, 1977: Cover and description.
- Google Books:Treasury Department Art Projects, Painting and Sculpture for Federal Buildings, November 17th to December 13th, 1936, the Corcoran Gallery of Art, Washington, Part 3 by United States Procurement Division Treasury Department, p.16: List of prints acquired.
- Smithsonian Archives of American Art: Federal Art Project, Photographic Division collection, circa 1920-1965, bulk 1935-1942
- Smithsonian Archives of American Art: Macbeth Gallery records, 1838-1968, bulk 1892-1953
