= Ernest George Henham =

Canadian-British author

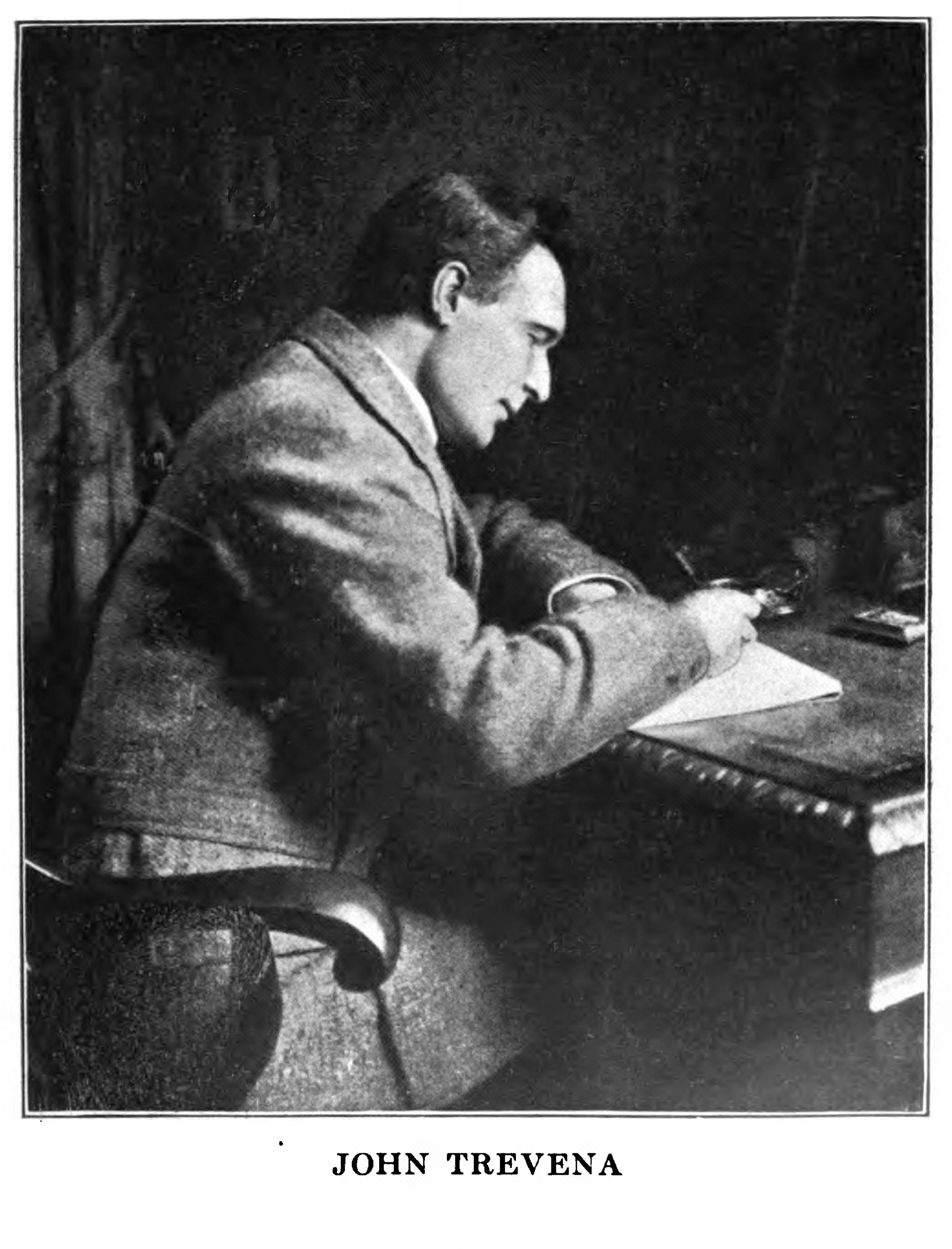
Ernest G. Henham (aka John Trevena) writing at his desk ca. 1912

Ernest George Henham (1870–1948) was a Canadian-British author who wrote novels at the beginning of the 20th century about Dartmoor and Devon, England. He also published literary works under the pseudonym John Trevena.

== General background ==
Thomas Ernest George Henham, otherwise Ernest George was born on 14 December 1870 and his writings include a series of novels based on Dartmoor, the moorland in Devon, England, where he lived much of his life. He created a pseudonym, John Trevena, for many of his books. It was probably no coincidence that the surname he chose was the original name for Tintagel, the legendary location of King Arthur's castle.

Henham wrote more than two dozen books, which were published between 1897 and 1927. He was considered a recluse, but often used people he encountered in real life for the characters in his work. In addition to the United Kingdom, his books were also published in the United States. The New York Times reviewed his books three times, on 21 March 1908, 24 March 1912 and 23 August 1914. He is perhaps best known for his trilogy: Furze the Cruel, Heather, and Granite. As stated by the author in his introductory remarks to Furze the Cruel:

Almost everywhere in Dartmoor are furze, heather and granite. The furze seems to suggest cruelty, the heather endurance, and the granite strength. The furze is destroyed by fire, but grows again; the granite is worn away imperceptively by the rain....

In his introduction to Heather, Trevena writes: "Heather, which flourishes only in pure air and sunshine, and blossoms again though it is torn by winds, seems to represent the spirit of Endurance." According to one American commentator,

...only Thomas Hardy and George Augustus Moore among contemporary novelists rival his art at its best. ... Trevena's novels are the expression of a passionate feeling for Nature, regarded as the sum of human personality and experience, in all its moods,--benign and malign, as man is benign and malign, and faithful to life in the stone as well as the flower...(John Trevena. By Violence with an Introduction by Edward J. O'Brien (Boston 1918)).

The natural world of the moor is important to many of his works and Trevena's themes are often about opposing ideas, such as educated vs. uneducated people; clean rural vs. dirty city living; and secular vs. religious philosophies. Trevena's personal perspective on the value of reading and writing is perhaps best captured in Sleeping Waters where he states:

"You can learn without reading, and you can live without writing... The state of ignorance may be a happy one; but when you die you leave a world which you have never really discovered, you depart from a life which you have never shared in, and you abandon for ever a wealth of beauty which has never been revealed to you. The reward of ignorance is a dull kind of self-conceit. If you were to read a dozen of the best books, you would talk less, my friend, and think more... ."

Henham also wrote some novels with fantastic content. Tenebrae (1898) features an enormous, menacing spider. The Feast of Bacchus: A Study in Dramatic Atmosphere (1907) is a supernatural horror novel. The Reign of the Saints (1911), (as John Trevena) is a science fiction novel set in a future Britain.

== List of published works ==
He published the following works under his real name:

- God, Man and the Devil (1897)
- Menotah: A Tale of the Riel Rebellion (1897)
- Tenebrae (1898)
- Pete Barker's Shanty (1898)
- Bonanza: A Tale of the Outside (1901)
- Scud (1902)
- The Plowshare and the Sword: A Tale of Old Quebec (1903)
- Krum: A Study in Consciousness (1904)
- A Pixy in Petticoats (1906)
- The Feast of Bacchus (1907)
- Bracken (1910)
- The Reign of the Saints (1913)

The following works were published under his pseudonym, John Trevena:

- Arminel of the West (1907)
- Furze the Cruel (1907)
- Heather (1908)
- Granite (1909)
- The Dartmoor House That Jack Built (1909)
- Written in the Rain (1910)
- Bracken (1910)
- The Reign of the Saints (1911)
- Wintering Hay (1912)
- No Place Like Home (1913)
- Sleeping Waters (1913)
- Adventures Among Wild Flowers (1914)
- Moyle Church-Town (1915)
- The Captain's Furniture (1916)
- Raindrops (1920)
- The Vanished Moor (1923)
- The Custom of the Manor (1924)
- Off the Beaten Track (1925)
- Typet's Treasure (1927).

Henham also published dozens of short stories in various magazines both under his own name and his pseudonym.
