= William Arms Fisher =

American historian, music editor, and writer on music (1861–1948)

William Arms Fisher

William Arms Fisher (April 27, 1861 – December 18, 1948) was an American composer, music historian and writer.

== Personal life ==
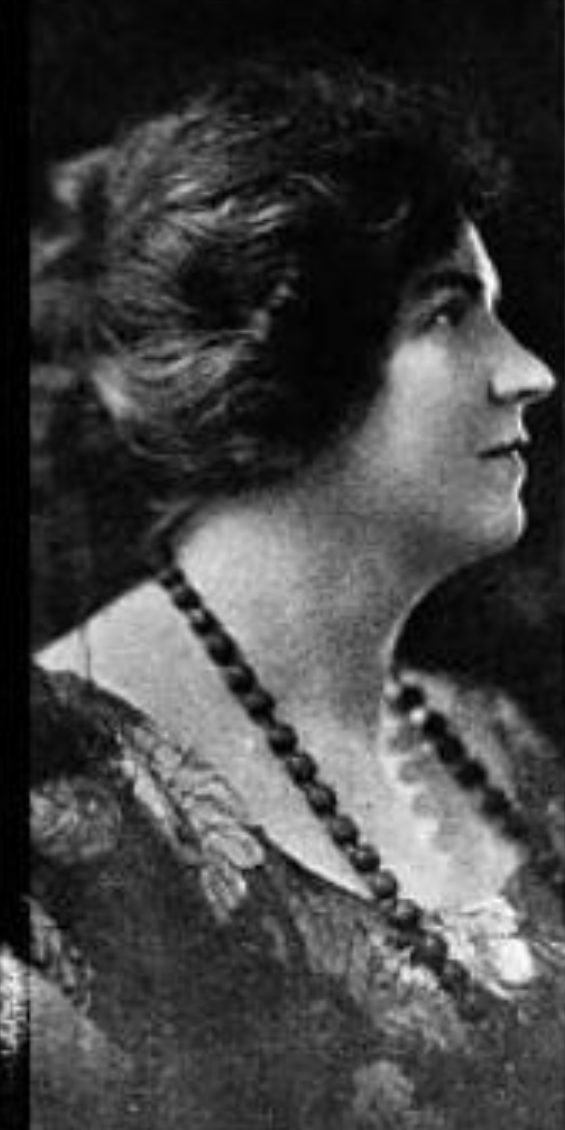
1927 photograph of Mrs. William Arms Fisher (Emma Roderick Hinckle). Fisher's wife was the vice-president of the National Federation of Music Clubs at the time this photo was taken.

Fisher was born in San Francisco, California, on April 27, 1861. He received his first lesson in music from John P. Morgan, a leading Western musician. Intended for a business career, he was led to devote himself entirely to music, and with that end in view he left California in 1890 and went to New York City. There he studied under Antonín Dvořák and Horatio Parker at the National Conservatory of Music of America. He was instructor in harmony at the Conservatory of Music for several years, resigning in 1895 to take up teaching in Boston.

He was president of the Music Teachers National Association and the Music Publishers' National Association. He also worked for the music publisher Oliver Ditson Company, which was later taken over by the Theodore Presser Company.

Fisher died in Brookline, Massachusetts on December 18, 1948.

== Career ==
In an 1893 interview, Antonín Dvořák challenged white American composers to make better use of the "negro melodies of America", feeling that they were needed as the basis for "any serious and original school of composition" in America.

Antonín Dvořák's New World Symphony was played at Carnegie Hall on December 16, 1893. Later William Arms Fisher wrote a text to the cor anglais tune in the second movement, entitled "Goin' Home", which has been mistaken for a Negro spiritual.

In response to the challenge and the symphony, William Arms Fisher published an arrangement of Seventy Negro Spirituals in 1926.

William Arms Fisher wrote an article for Music Educators' Journal in 1933 titled "Music in a Changing World." Patrick Freer of Music Educators' Journal said that "Fisher’s article was one of the first to interrogate the role of popular music within music education". In his article, Fisher said that music is important in every community. A quote from his article is "Blessed are the music-makers, for they shall uplift and unite the Earth." which was mentioned by the MENC: The National Association for Music Education.

== Recognition ==
A February 1927 article in the NAACP paper The Crisis calls William Arms Fisher "a worthy pupil and disciple of Dvořák" and asks rhetorically if he "would waste his time over futile music." The article quotes an anonymous reviewer, "by all means let us have Fisher to arrange" Negro spirituals.

== Media ==
Fisher's compositions have been featured in several albums.

One of his compositions appeared in the 1947 film Buck Privates Come Home.

== Publications ==
- Sixty Irish Songs – (1915)
- Notes on Music in Old Boston – (1918)
- Goin' Home (sheet music, 1922)
- One Hundred and Fifty Years of Music Publishing in the United States – (1934)
- Ye Olde New-England Psalm-tunes 1620–1820 – (1930)
- The Music that Washington Knew – (1931)
