= Olga de Moraes Sarmento =

Portuguese writer and feminist

- Born: Maria Olga de Moraes Sarmento da Silveira; 26 May 1881; Setúbal, Portugal
- Died: 17 October 1948 (aged 67); Lisbon, Portugal
- Occupations: writer, feminist
- Partner: Baroness Hélène van Zuylen (companion)

Maria Olga de Moraes Sarmento da Silveira (Note: Sometimes spellt Olga Morais Sarmento) (26 May 1881 – 17 October 1948) was a Portuguese writer and feminist.

== Early life ==
Sarmento was born in Setúbal, 26 May 1881. She was a daughter and granddaughter of military men, spending part of her childhood in Elvas, where she became a friend of Virgínia Quaresma. She married a Navy physician when she was 16, who died shortly afterwards in combat, in Cuamato, Angola.

== Career ==
Sarmento associated with a group of Portuguese intellectuals, who at the beginning of the 20th century, fought for civil rights, as well as women's legal and political rights. She succeeded Ana de Castro Osório as editor-in-chief of Sociedade Futura (founded 1902). She was affiliated with Liga Portuguesa da Paz (Portuguese League of Peace), co-founding the organization and serving as president of its Feminist Section in 1906.

On May 18, 1906, Sarmento delivered a lecture on "Problema Feminista" (Feminist Problem) at the Sociedad de Geografia de Lisboa. She also traveled as a lecturer to South America, visiting Brazil, Uruguay, and Argentina. In Brazil, she met and became friends with the writer Júlia Lopes de Almeida.

== Personal life ==
Sarmento lived in Paris during the First World War. For more than thirty years, she was a companion and partner of Baroness Hélène van Zuylen, of the Rothschild banking family of France, whom she saved from the Holocaust by taking her to Lisbon and then to New York City. She also devoted herself to writing the Baroness' memoirs.

Sarmento was closely linked to her city of birth, Setúbal, leaving all her assets to the municipality, including her personal library and a vast collection of autographs of personalities from art, music and literature in postcards, letters, and books. This legacy is part of the collection of the Museu de Setúbal/Convento de Jesus. She died in Lisbon, 17 October 1948.

== Selected works ==
- Problema Feminista (1906)
- Mulheres illustres: A Marqueza de Alorna (sua influencia na sociedade portuguesa, 1750-1839) (1907)
- Arte, Literatura & Viagens (1909)
- A Infanta Dona Maria e a Corte Portuguesa (1909)
- La Patrie Brésilienne (1912)
- Sa Majesté la Reine Amélie de Portugal, Princesse de France (1924)
- Teófilo Braga: Notas e Comentários (1925)
- As Minhas Memórias: Tempo Passado, Tempo Ausente (1948)

== Honors ==
- Legión de Honor
- Orden de Cristo
- Orden de Santiago de la Espada
