= Conal Holmes O'Connell O'Riordan =

Irish dramatist and novelist

Conal Holmes O'Connell O'Riordan (pseudonym Norreys Connell) (29 April 1874 – 18 June 1948) was an Irish dramatist and novelist.

== Works ==
=== Novels ===
His novels include:

- In the Green Park or The Half-Pay Deities (1894)
- The House of the Strange Woman (1895)
- The Fool and His Heart (1896)
- The Pity of War (1906)
- Adam of Dublin (1920)
- Adam and Caroline (1921)
- In London: The Story of Adam and Marriage (1922)
- Rowena Barnes (1923)
- Married Life (1924)
- The Age of Miracles (1925)
- Young Lady Drazincourt (1925)
- Soldier Born (1927)
- Soldier of Waterloo (1928)
- Soldier’s Wife (1935)
- Soldier's End (1938)
- Judith Quinn, a Novel for Women (1939)
- Judith’s Love (1940)

=== Plays ===
His plays include:

- Shakespeare's End (1912)
- Rope Enough (1913)
- His Majesty's Pleasure (1925)
- Napoleon’s Josephine (1928)
- The King's Wooing (1929)
