= Elsie K. Morton =

New Zealand journalist and writer

- Born: Katherine Elizabeth Morton; October 5, 1885; Devonport, Auckland, New Zealand
- Died: August 21, 1968 (aged 82)
- Occupations: journalist, writer

Katherine Elizabeth Morton, better known as Elsie K. Morton (5 October 1885 – 21 August 1968), was a New Zealand journalist and writer. She was born in Devonport, Auckland, New Zealand.

== See also ==
- Kermadec Islands#History
