= Jatindramohan Bagchi =

Bengali poet and editor

- Born: 27 November 1878; Jamsherpur, Nadia, Bengal Presidency, British India
- Died: 1 February 1948 (aged 69); Calcutta, West Bengal, India
- Occupations: Poet, editor

Jatindramohan Bagchi (27 November 1878 — 1 February 1948) (Bengali: যতীন্দ্রমোহন বাগচি) was a Bengali poet and editor best known for his poem 'Kajla Didi'.

== Early life ==
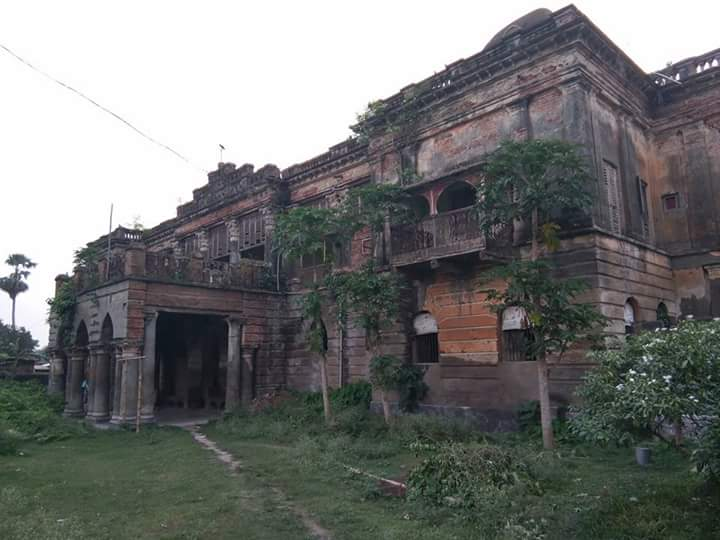
Birthplace of Jatindramohan, Jamsherpur, Nadia

He was born in a zamindar family at Jamsherpur village, in Nadia district in rural Bengal. He took his first degree from the Duff College (now Scottish Church College) in Calcutta.

== Professional career ==
He worked in varying capacities as secretary to Justice Saradacharan Mitra, and to the Maharaja of Natore. Later he would work as License Collector of the Kolkata Municipal Corporation, and as manager of FN Gupta Company.

== Literary career ==
He was a prolific contributor to a number of literary journals. Between 1909 and 1913, he also edited the cultural journal Manasi. In 1921 and in 1922, he served as a joint editor of another cultural journal Jamuna. He would later become the owner and editor of the journal Purvachal between 1947 and 1948. . He is considered a major voice of the post-Rabindranath period in Bengali poetry. His poetry conveyed the intricacies of life in rural Bengal, in all its joys and sorrows. He died on 1 February 1948.

== Works ==
=== Poems ===
- Kajladidi
- Andha Badhu.
- Satyadas

=== Collected books ===
- Lekha (1906),
- Rekha (1910),
- Aparajita (1915),
- Bandhur Dan (1918),
- Jagarani (1922),
- Niharika (1927)
- Mahabharati (1936)

=== Criticism ===
- Rabindranath O Yugasahitya
