= Anima allegra =

Anima allegra (English: A Lively Spirit) is an opera in three acts by composer Franco Vittadini that premiered 15 April 1921 at the Teatro Costanzi in Rome. The work's Italian-language libretto was co-authored by Giuseppe Adami and Luigi Motta and is partially based on the play El genio alegre by the Quintero brothers. It was originally written for the composer Giacomo Puccini, who ultimately chose not to pursue the project after he determined the story was not dramatic enough to suit him. Vittadini became attached to the project after Puccini backed out. According to Grove Music Online, it was the most successful work of Vittandi's career and was subsequently staged by many opera houses and companies worldwide. The United States premiere of Anima allegra was given at the Metropolitan Opera in New York on 14 February 1923.
