= Ruth France =

New Zealand librarian, poet, novelist (1913–1968)

Helena Ruth France (née Henderson; 12 June 1913 – 19 August 1968) was a New Zealand librarian, poet and novelist.

== Early life and education ==
France was born in Leithfield, North Canterbury, New Zealand in 1913, the daughter of Francis and Helena Henderson. Her mother Helena was a writer of unpublished novels and plays as well as published poems and stories in the local Christchurch newspaper. She attended Christchurch Girls' High School.

== Career ==
France worked at the Canterbury Public Library before her marriage to boatbuilder Arnold France in 1934. The Henderson family were Catholic; France's father objected to her marriage to a non-Catholic and feigned suicide the night before the wedding. She then rejected Catholicism.

She lived on a yacht in Lyttelton Harbour for four years, rowing Arnold to work. They had two sons and the family moved to Sumner. She was friends with Elsie Locke, but considered Christchurch authors and poets prejudiced against women.

Her two published novels are The Race (1958) and Ice Cold River (1961). The Race is based on the ill-fated Lyttelton to Wellington yacht race in 1951 in which her husband participated. She received a £100 award from the New Zealand Literary Fund for The Race. Ice Cold River is a family story set on a Canterbury farm which is cut off by floods. She published poems under her own name in various publications including Landfall, and two books of poems Unwilling Pilgrim (1955) and The Halting Place (1961) under the name of Paul Henderson. Her poems were included in a publication Best Poems in 1958 and the Penguin Book of New Zealand Verse.

She died in Christchurch in 1968, leaving a third adult novel The Tunnel unfinished.

A collection of her poems No Traveller Returns: the selected poems of Ruth France was published in 2020.
