= Hédi Khayachi =

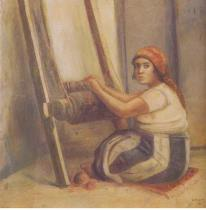
The Weaver (later used on a Tunisian postage stamp)

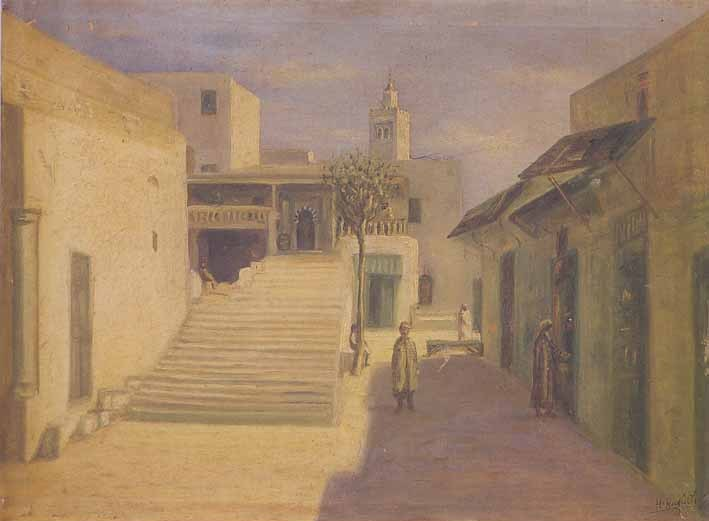
Café des Nattes in Sidi Bou Said

Hédi Khayachi (1882 in Tunis – 1948 in Marsa) was a Tunisian painter. He was the first professional Muslim painter in Tunisia and the official portraitist of the Husseinite court.

== Early life ==
His father came from an aristocratic line linked to the prophet Muhammad, which settled in Tripolitania before establishing themselves in Tunis during the time of Al-Husayn I ibn Ali at-Turki. The Khayachi branch of the family settled in Monastir, Tunisia between the end of the 18th and the beginning of the 19th centuries as suppliers to civil servants. His mother was of Mamluk origin; her father had founded his own artisan business in Tunis.

Having a fondness for painting, Khayachi frequented the free academies in Montparnasse and received an artistic education in Rome, where he was instructed in portraiture and visited the European museums.

== Work ==
In 1908, he produced official portraits of the Husseinite Beys and then worked for several leading families and high dignitaries, which allowed him to be described as the major portraitist in Tunisian painting. Most of his works, therefore, are portraits, but Khayachi also painted landscapes and scenes of traditional life and customs in the houses of the middle-classes, as well as more modest homes. In his canvases, he paid tribute to women in different styles and mastered the interaction of light and shadow.

Khayachi appeared amongst the group of forerunners in Tunisian painting: Pierre Boucherle, Yahia Turki, Moses Lévy, Jules Lellouche, Ali Bellagha, Ammar Farhat, Maurice Bismouth, Hatem El Mekki and Edgard Naccache. He produced about twenty exhibitions in Tunisia and in Europe and represented Tunisia in numerous international artistic events.

He died at the age of 66, leaving unfinished paintings which were completed and signed by his son, Noureddine Khayachi, who was also a painter. Hédi Khayachi was honoured in 1983, 1997 and 2000 by the issue of postage stamps by La Poste Tunisienne.
