= Margaret Pedler =

British novelist

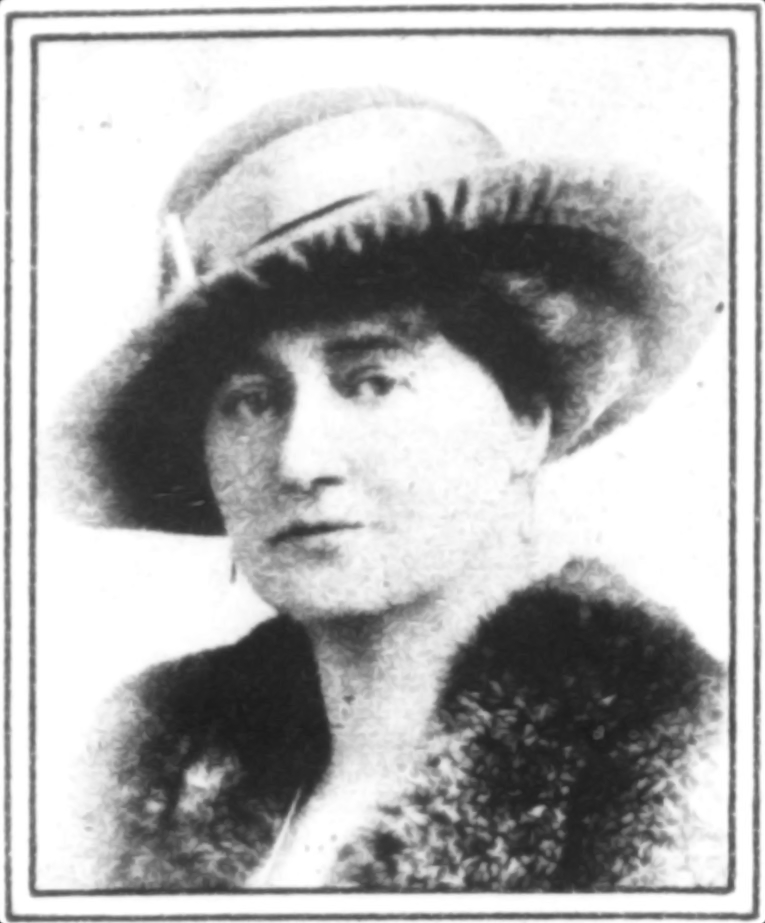
Photo of Margaret Pedler (Mid-Week Pictorial, (NY) 29 July 1926), p. 7; included in a review of her book, "Tomorrow's Tangle."

Margaret Pedler (1877 – 28 December 1948) was a British novelist, who wrote popular works of romantic fiction.

== Biography ==
Initially Pedler studied piano and singing at the Royal Academy of Music, and published several songs for which she wrote both the music and lyrics. Over her career as a best-selling writer, from 1917 to 1947, she produced 28 novels.

== Works ==
1. The Splendid Folly: 1917
2. The House of Dreams-Come-True: 1919
3. The Hermit of Far End: 1920
4. The Moon out of Reach: 1921(?)
5. The Lamp of Fate: 1921
6. The Vision of Desire: 1922(?)
7. The Barbarian Lover: 1923
8. Waves of Destiny: 1924
9. Red Ashes: 1925
10. Tomorrow's Tangle: 1926
11. Yesterday's Harvest: 1926
12. Bitter Heritage: 1928
13. The Guarded Halo: 1929
14. Fire of Youth: 1930
15. Many Ways (Perfect Love Stories): 1931
16. Kindled Flame: 1931(?)
17. Desert Sand: 1932
18. The Greater Courage: 1933
19. Pitiless Choice: 1933
20. Distant Dawn: 1934 – published in England as "Green Judgment"
21. The Shining Cloud: 1935(?)
22. Checkered Paths: 1935(?)
23. Flame in the Wind: 1937
24. No Armour Against Fate: 1938(?)
25. Blind Loyalty: 1940
26. Not Heaven Itself: 1941
27. Then Came the Test: 1942
28. No Gifts from Chance: 1944
29. Unless Two Be Agreed: 1947
