= Charles Silvestre =

French writer

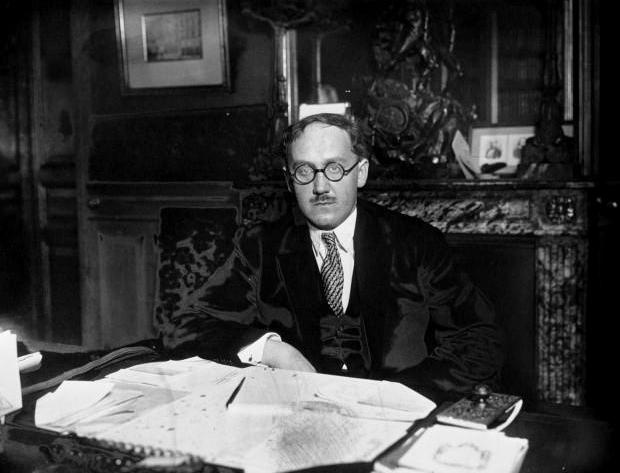
- Born: Gaston Armand Silvestre; 2 February 1889; Tulle
- Died: 21 March 1948 (aged 59); Bellac
- Occupation: Writer

Charles Silvestre (French pronunciation: [ʃaʁl silvɛstʁ]; 2 February 1889 – 31 March 1948) was a French regionally inspired novel writer. A friend of Charles Maurras, he collaborated with the Action française.

The settings of his novels are usually the borders of Limousin and Poitou. He won the literary Prix Femina in 1926 with his novel Prodige du cœur.

== Works ==
- 1920: L'Incomparable Ami
- 1920: Le Soleil de Salamine
- 1922: L'Amour et la mort de Jean Pradeau, preface by Jérôme and Jean Tharaud, (published as a roman-feuilleton in L'Action française from 22 July 1933 to 16 August 1933)
- 1923: Le Merveilleux Médecin
- 1924: Aimée Villard, fille de France
- 1924: Cœurs paysans, introduction by Henri Pourrat
- 1925: Belle Sylvie
- 1926: Prodige du cœur, Prix Femina, adorned with 28 original watercolors by Jean Texcier
- 1926: Dans la lumière du cloître, Plon - Le Roseau d'Or n° 11
- 1927: Amour sauvé
- 1928: Le Vent du gouffre
- 1929: La Prairie et la flamme
- 1929: Le Voyage rustique
- 1931: Monsieur Terral
- 1931: Pleine terre
- 1932: Au soleil des saisons
- 1933: Le Livre d'un terrien
- 1933: L'Orage sur la maison
- 1933: Le Passé d'amour
- 1934: Le Nid d'épervier
- 1935: La Roue tourne
- 1936: Le Démon du soir
- 1936: Mère et fils
- 1944: Dernier Noël
- 1946: Manoir

== Bibliography ==
- Correspondance Henri Pourrat-Charles Silvestre, éd. critique établie par Claude Dalet, pref. by Claire Pourrat, Clermont-Ferrand, Bibliothèque municipale et interuniversitaire, 1983
