= August Brömse =

Bohemian artist (1873–1925)

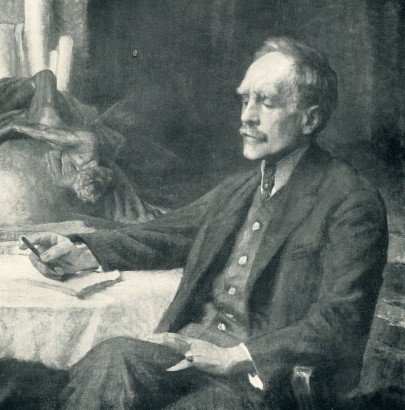
August Brömse; portrait by Franz Thiele

August Brömse (2 September 1873, in Františkovy Lázně – 7 November 1925, in Prague) was a Bohemian German etcher and painter.

== Life and work ==
He was the son of Karl Johann Brömse, a decorative painter from Rostock. After an apprenticeship in his father's workshop, he received lessons at a private school in Berlin, operated by Adolf Schlabitz. From 1892, he attended the Academy of Arts, where he studied with Woldemar Friedrich, Christian Ludwig Bokelmann, and the animal painter, Paul Friedrich Meyerheim. He also took courses in anatomy from Rudolf Virchow. His artistic education was completed with private classes in etching and engraving, taught by Louis Jacoby.

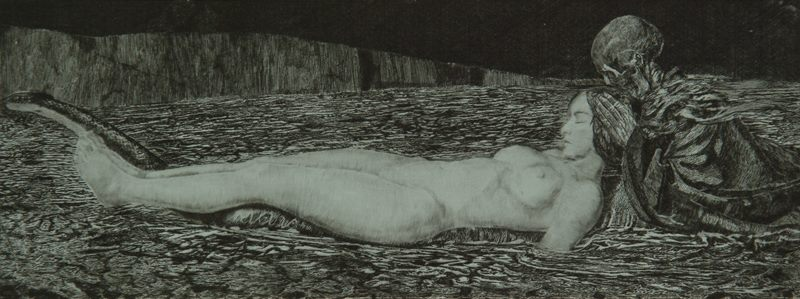
"Dead" from Death and the Maiden

After that, he returned home and worked as a freelance artist. It was there, from 1902 to 1903, that he created his first large etching cycle, "Death and the Maiden", in fourteen sheets. It was awarded a gold medal in 1906, at an exhibition in the Palais du Travail, in Paris. The etchings were eventually acquired by the Kupferstichkabinett Berlin.

Encouraged by his success in Paris, he moved to Prague, where he once again started as a freelance artist. From 1906 to 1908, he worked on another cycle, of ten sheets, called "Das ganze Sein ist flammend Leid" (roughly; The Whole of Existence is Fiery Suffering/Sorrow). In 1907, he began to work with colored etchings; converting his first cycle into that format. In his later years, he created paintings from a type of paint that he made himself.

He was married in 1910, to Else Schünemann and they had one son. That same year, he was named a full member of the "Society for the Advancement of Science and Art" and appointed a Professor at the Academy of Fine Arts. His best known student there was Mikuláš Galanda. He was also a member of the "Union of German Artists in Bohemia".

After the establishment of Czechoslovakia, in 1920, he became the honorary chairman of a society of young painters, known as "Die Pilger' (The Pilgrims), many of whose members were his former students; such as Josef Hegenbarth, Mary Duras and Maxim Kopf. He died of tuberculosis in 1925.

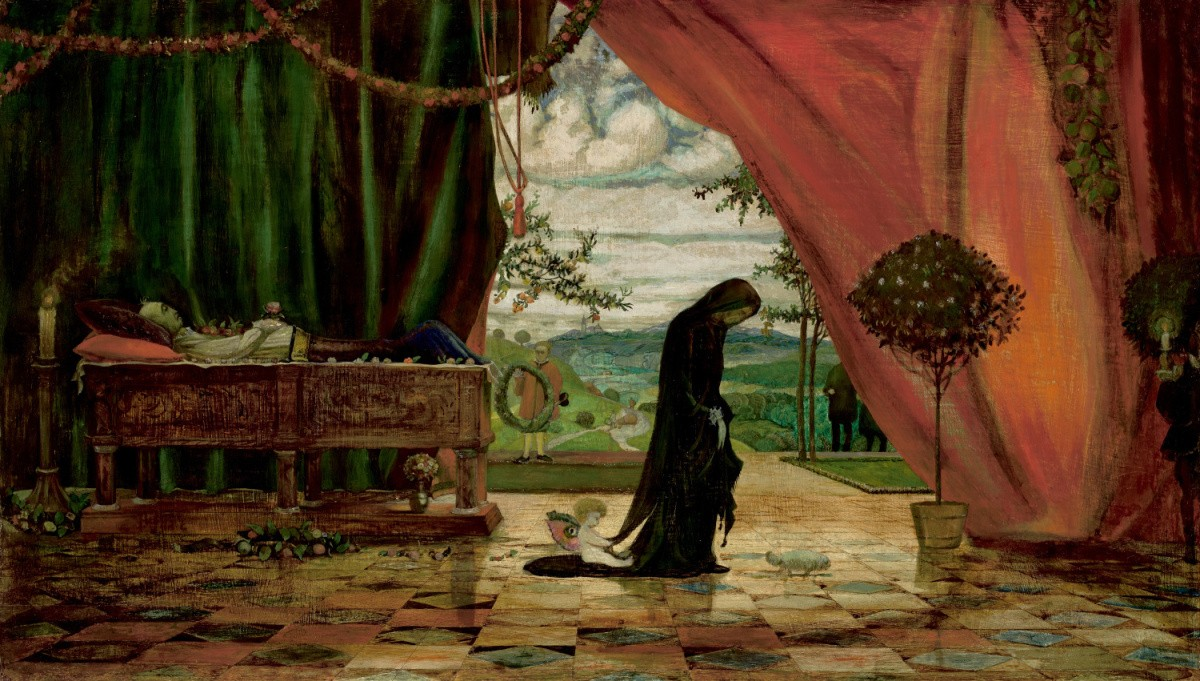
The Widow

== Sources ==
- "Brömse, August". In: Ulrich Thieme (Ed.): Allgemeines Lexikon der Bildenden Künstler von der Antike bis zur Gegenwart, Vol.5: Brewer–Carlingen. E. A. Seemann, Leipzig 1911, pg.49 (Online)
- "Brömse, August". In: Hans Vollmer (Ed.): Allgemeines Lexikon der bildenden Künstler des XX. Jahrhunderts, Vol.1: A–D. E. A. Seemann, Leipzig 1953, pg.321
- (in German) Manfred Knedlik: Brömse, August. In: Allgemeines Künstlerlexikon. Die Bildenden Künstler aller Zeiten und Völker (AKL). Band 14, Saur, München u. a. 1996, ISBN 3-598-22754-X, S. 330
