= Ludwig Hans Fischer =

Austrian painter

- Born: 2 March 1848; Salzburg, Austrian Empire
- Died: 24 April 1915 (aged 67); Vienna, Austria-Hungary
- Education: Vienna Academy of Fine Arts
- Known for: Painter, watercolorist, engraver, illustrator, ethnologist, author
- Movement: Orientalist

Ludwig Hans Fischer (2 March 1848 - 24 April 1915) was an Austrian landscape painter, copper engraver, etcher and ethnologist. He was noted for his paintings of Oriental subjects, especially African and Indian women wearing traditional costume.

== Biography ==
A pupil, at the Vienna Academy of Fine Arts, of Eduard von Lichtenfels in painting, of Louis Jacoby in engraving, and of William Unger in etching. After completing his studies, in around 1875, he travelled to Italy, Spain, Egypt, Tunisia, Libya, Egypt, Palestine and India before settling in Vienna. In 1879 he exhibited in Vienna and in the same year, he returned to the Orient. During these travels, he prepared many watercolours and sketches in situ.

In 1875, he received a grant to travel to the Middle East and Palestine; a journey that resulted in the publication of a sketchbook. In 1879, he published another sketchbook following his travels to Turkey, Jerusalem and the Dead Sea.

In addition to a number of oil paintings, he prepared nine large landscapes for the Vienna Museum of Natural History in 1889. Among his series of etchings and engravings, the set published as Historical Landscapes from Austria-Hungary is his most remarkable production. He also painted many water-colors, produced illustrations for a number of books. and designed a number of coins for the Numismatic Society of Vienna.

He was an active member of Vienna's arts culture, through his membership of art groups. He founded the Watercolourists Club in his home city.

Fischer was also writer. He published books on a variety of topics including the craft of painting and watercolours such as Die Technik der Aquarellmalerei [The Technique of Watercolour] first published in 1888, and Die Technik der Ölmalerei [The Technique of Oil Painting] first published in 1911. He wrote travel books, for which he provided the illustrations, and also published several ethnographic works including: Indischer Volksschmuck und die Art ihn zu tragen, 1890 [Indian Folk Jewelry and How to Wear It], and Eine neolitische Ansiedelung in Wien (Ober-St. Veit), Gemeindeberg [A Neolithic Settlement in Vienna (Upper St. Veit)], 1898.

== Work ==
Fischer published more than 40 books including handbooks, manuals and guidebooks. Typically, these were richly illustrated with his own prints. He also provided illustrations for other authors.

Select list of publications

- Die Technik der Aquarell-Malerei, [The Technique of Watercolor Painting] by Ludwig Hans Fischer, 1888
- Bosnisches Skizzenbuch : Landschafts- und Kultur-Bilder aus Bosnien und der Hercegovina, [Bosnian sketchbook: Landscape and culture pictures from Bosnia and the Hercegovina] by Milena Preindlsberger-Mrazović, illustrated by Ludwig Hans Fischer, 1900
- Die Technik der Ölmalerei, [The Technique of Oil Painting], by Ludwig Hans Fischer and Erwin Schneider, 1925
- Historische Landschaften aus Oesterreich-Ungarn, [Historical landscapes from Austria-Hungary] by Ludwig Hans Fischer, c. 1884
- Indischer Volksschmuck und die Art ihn zu tragen, [Indian folk jewelry and the way to wear it] by Ludwig Hans Fischer, 1890

Selected illustrations

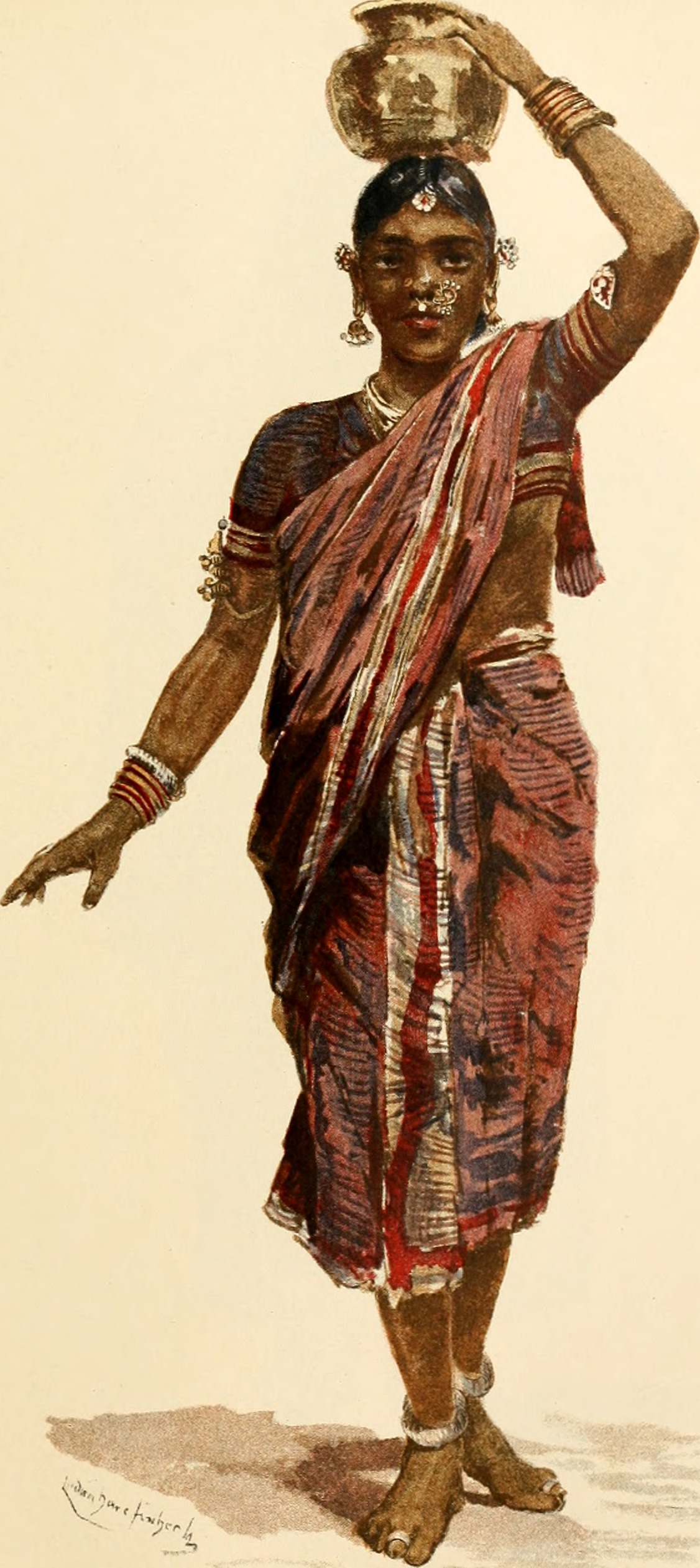
Tamil woman, 1890 illustration from Annalen des K.K. Naturhistorischen Hofmuseums

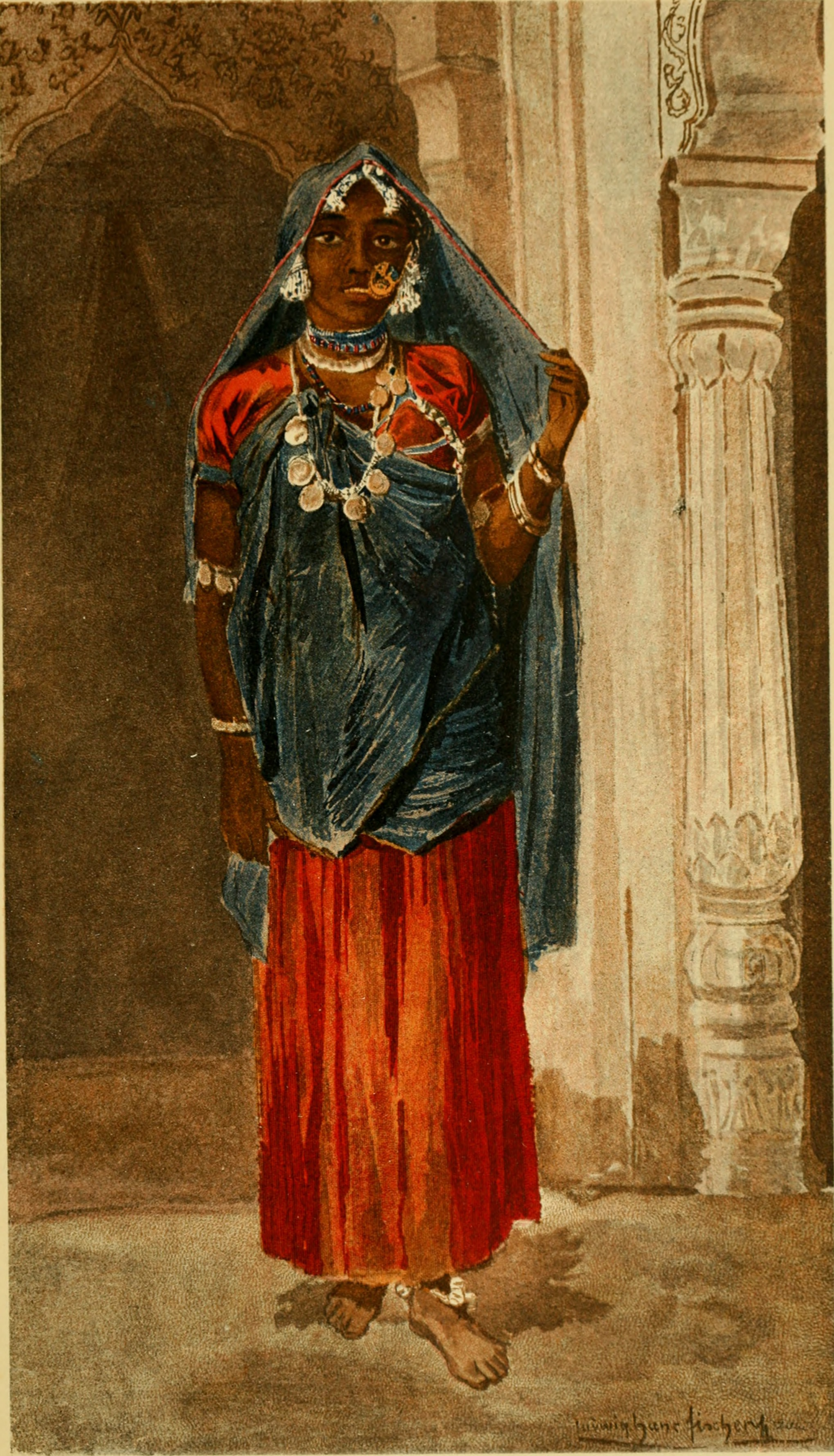
Dancer from Delhi, 1890, illustration from Annalen des K.K. Naturhistorischen Hofmuseums

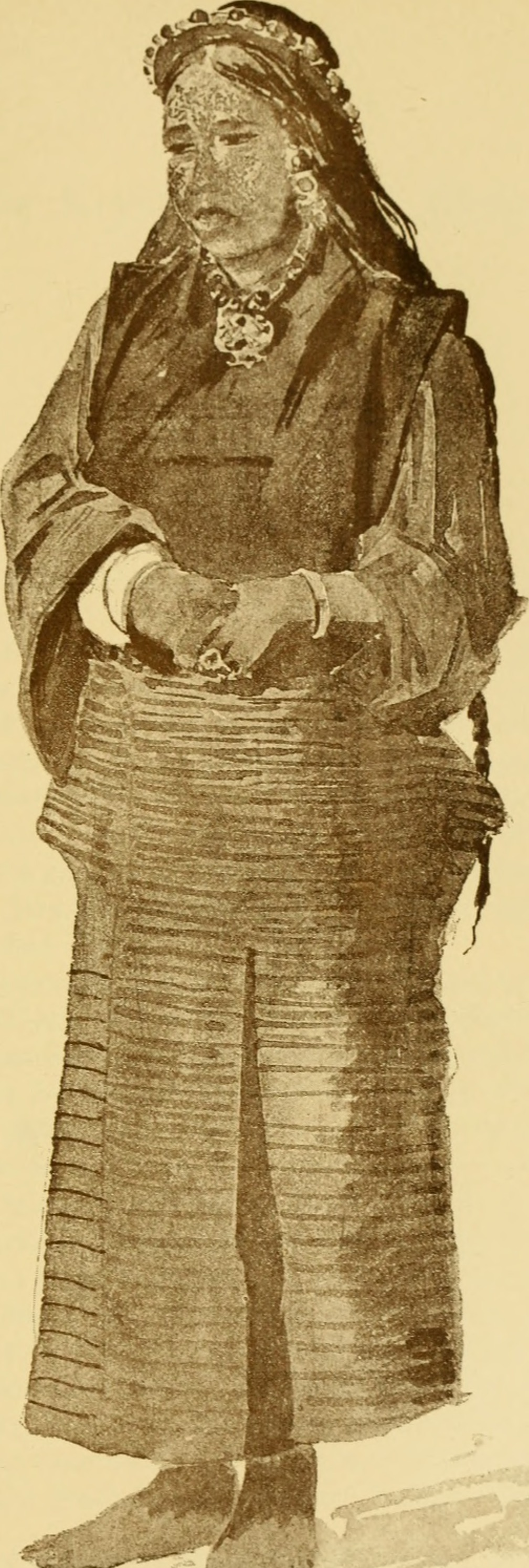
Leptscha woman from Oardschillini, 1890, illustration from Annalen des K.K. Naturhistorischen Hofmuseums

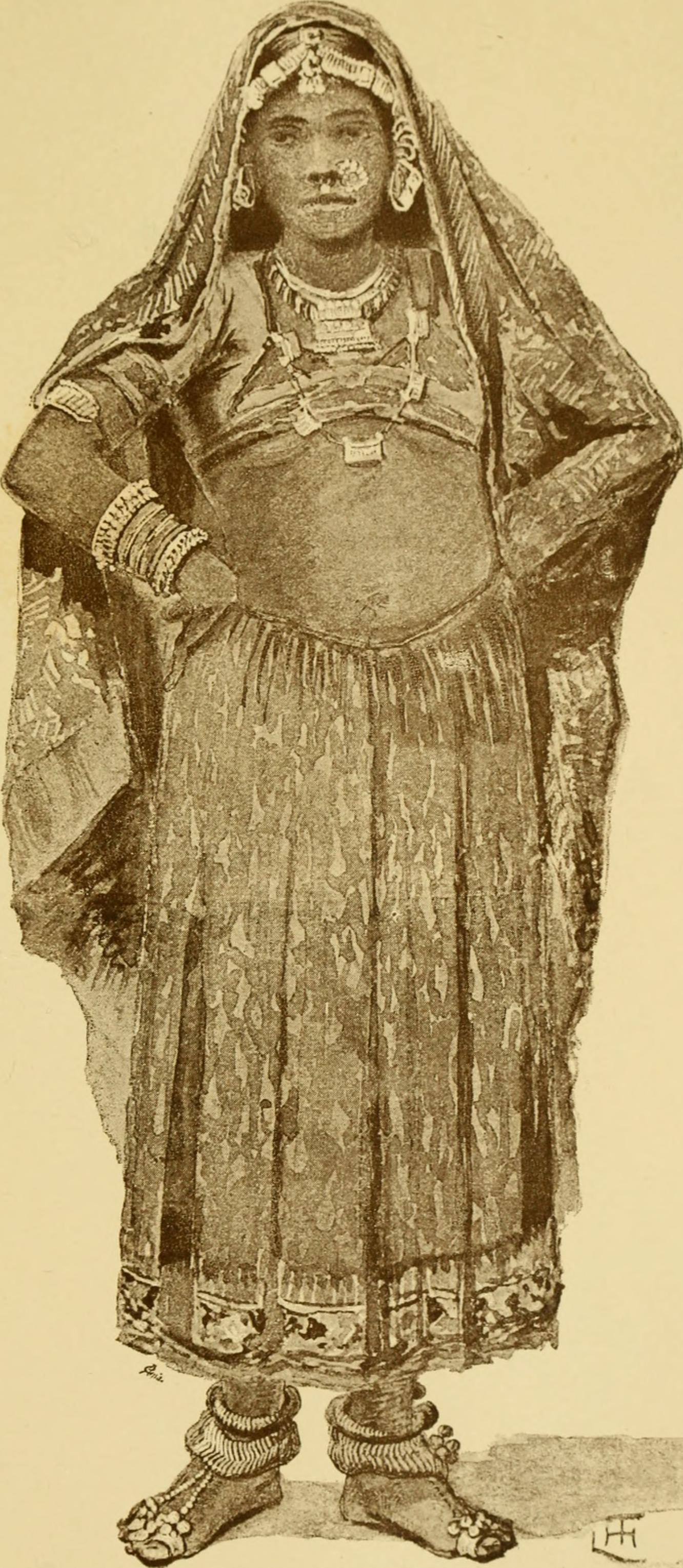
Woman from Indian Folk Jewelry

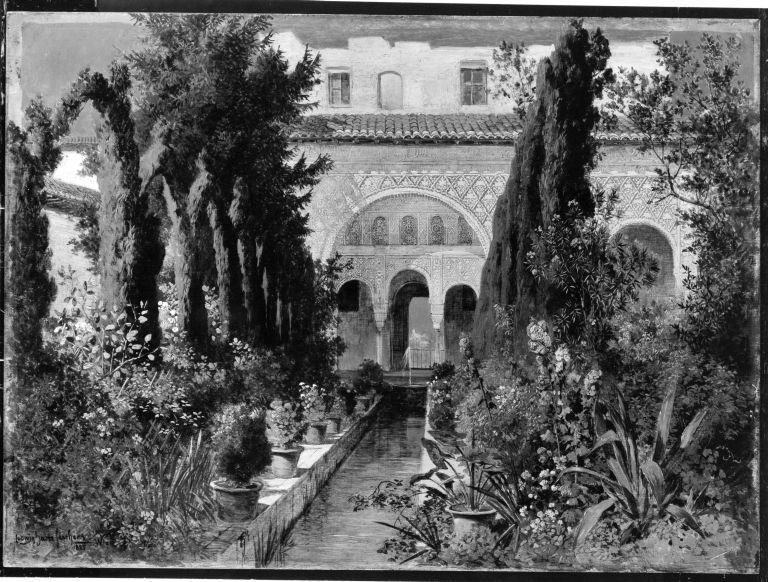
The Garden of the Generalife at Granada

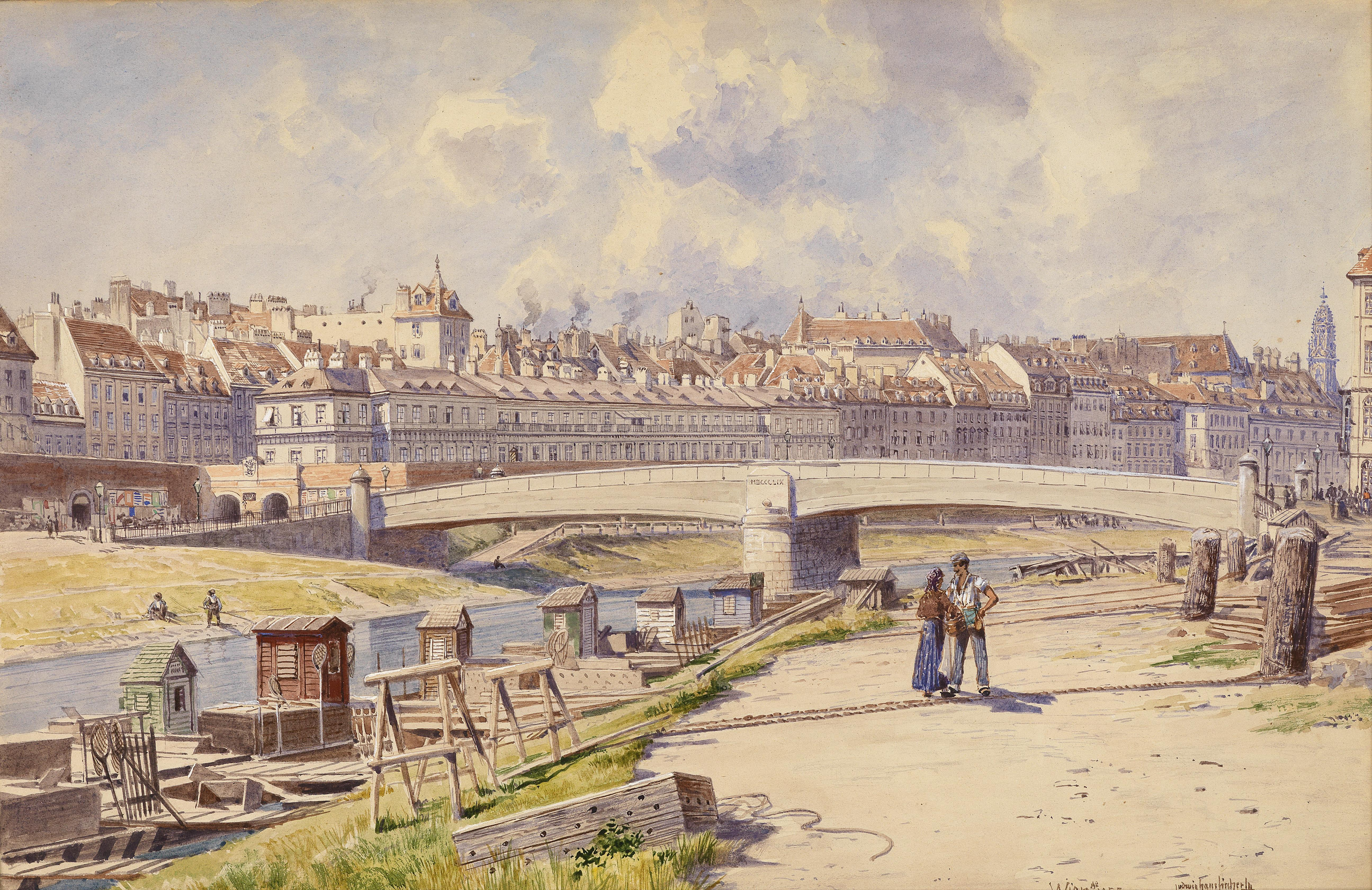
Fishing boats on the Danube Canal, Vienna

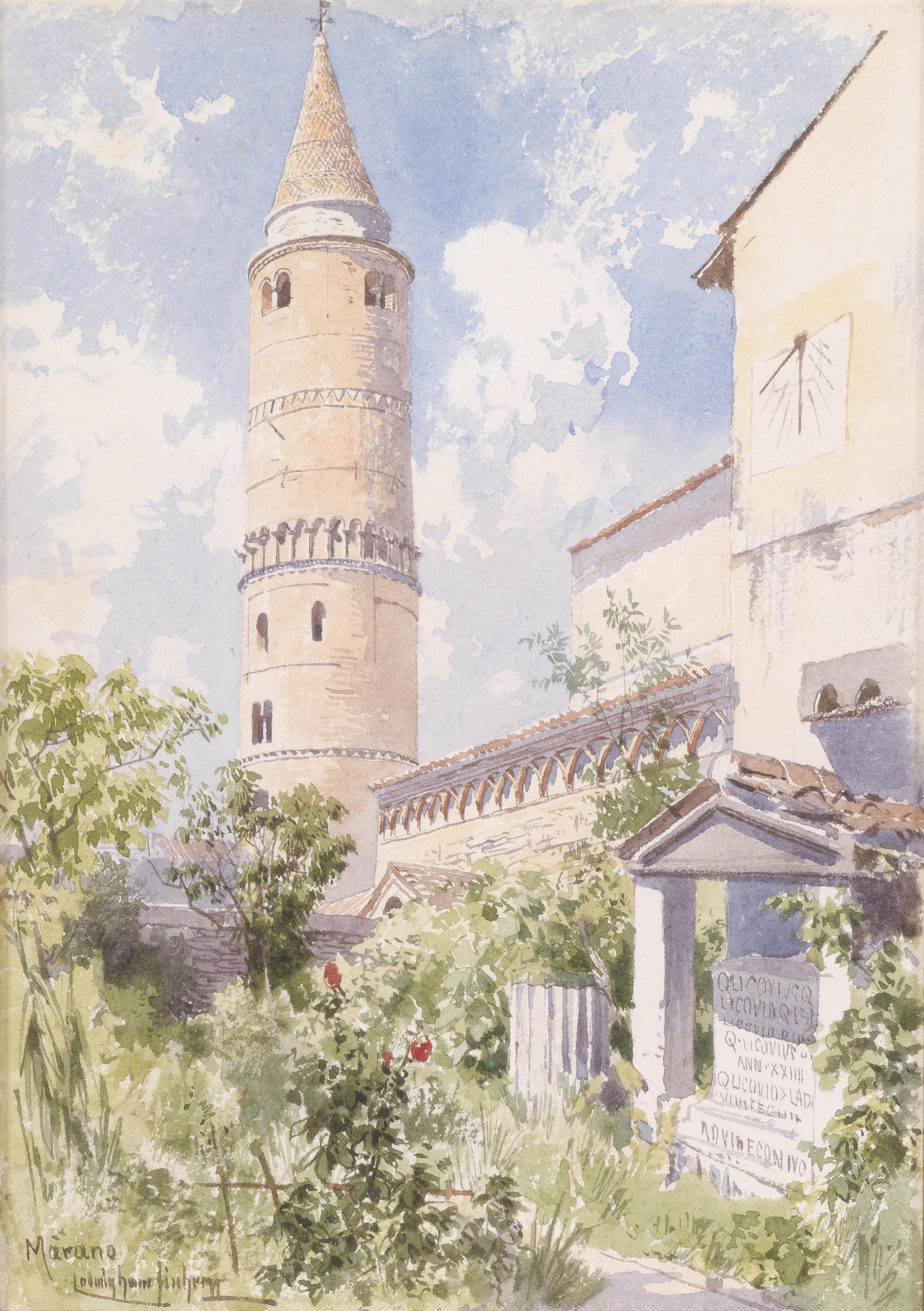
Bell tower of the Duomo in Caorle

== See also ==
- List of Orientalist artists
- Oriental studies
