= Maxim Kopf =

Austrian-American artist (1892–1958)

Maxim Kopf (born Maximilian Kopf; 18 January 1892 – 6 July 1958) was an Austrian-American painter, graphic artist and sculptor. Active primarily in Prague, he was a prominent figure of German cultural life in Czechoslovakia during the interwar period. His early work was strongly influenced by Expressionism. He later turned to biblical subjects, cityscapes, and landscapes. Often described as a cosmopolitan painter, Kopf produced work in Germany, Czechoslovakia, France, Polynesia and the United States, and traveled extensively in Italy, Spain, Switzerland, Dalmatia, Bessarabia and Crimea.

== Early life and education ==
Kopf was born on 18 January 1892 in Vienna, the second of four children of Austrian civil servant Emil Kopf (1863–1911) and his wife Louisa, née Jagemann (died 1865). He grew up in a German-speaking household and may have had Czech roots through his grandmother Maria Truhelková. From 1911 he studied at the Academy of Fine Arts, Prague under August Brömse, Franz Thiele, Vlaho Bukovac and Karl Krattner. During the First World War he served as an officer in the Joint Army of Austria-Hungary.

== Interwar career in Prague ==
After the war Kopf chose Czechoslovak citizenship and remained in Prague. He joined the Metznerbund and in 1919 co-founded, with August Brömse, the artist group Die Pilger (The Pilgrims), an association of German-speaking artists in Bohemia. Early members included Josef Hegenbarth, Emil Helzel, Norbert Hochsieder, Julius Pfeiffer and Leo Sternhell, while Mary Duras, Walther Klemm, Moriz Melzer and Emil Orlik joined later. The group remained active until 1925. In 1920, Kopf received a prize from the Prague Academy for the painting The Pilgrim. A scholarship enabled him to continue his studies from 1921 to 1923 at the Dresden Academy of Fine Arts under Otto Gussmann (1869-1926).

In 1927, Kopf founded the Young Art group in Prague, which held its first exhibition in 1928 and from which the Prague Secession emerged in 1929. The Prague Secession held annual exhibitions at the Art Association for Bohemia from 1929 through 1937. In 1933–34 Kopf executed the large ceiling fresco of the former German House in Prague.

== Travels and the South Seas ==
Kopf traveled to Tahiti and the Marquesas Islands in 1924, beginning his first South Seas cycle of paintings. In 1925 he worked for the Ziegfeld Theater in New York, where he organized an exhibition in the New Gallery for visiting artists Hilde Goldschmidt, Friedrich Karl Gotsch and Hans Meyboden. He subsequently spent time in Paris and Montrouge before returning to Prague.

At the end of summer 1934 he undertook a second voyage, traveling via Suez, Ceylon, Singapore, Sydney and New Caledonia to Tahiti. This journey produced the paintings of his second South Sea cycle. He returned to Prague in spring 1935 by way of Martinique. In 1936 he spent a month visiting countries on the Black Sea, including the USSR, Bessarabia, Sevastopol and Yalta in Crimea. In May 1938 he traveled to Tahiti for the third time, returning to Prague in autumn of that year.

== Emigration and later life ==
After the fall of Czechoslovakia, Kopf fled Prague via Germany and the Netherlands to Paris in March 1939. He was arrested and interned as an enemy alien for five months. He then joined the French Foreign Legion and was posted to French Morocco, but was interned again after France's capitulation. He was subsequently transferred to Martinique, where he was again interned, spending more than two years in camps in total. In 1941 he was able to emigrate to the United States and settled in New York. He received American citizenship in 1942.

In 1944 he exhibited at the American British Art Center. In the summer of 1945 he visited Prague for the last time, accompanied by Dorothy Thompson and her son. His final trip to Tahiti took place in April 1952.

Kopf died on 6 July 1958 in Lebanon, New Hampshire. He and Dorothy Thompson are buried in Barnard Cemetery.

=== Personal life ===
Kopf married the sculptor Mary Duras in Prague in 1927; they had previously spent time together in New York in 1923. The marriage ended in divorce in 1933. In 1936 he married the actress Lotte Stein in Prague; this marriage also ended in divorce in the 1940s.

In the summer of 1942 he met the journalist Dorothy Thompson (1893–1961) and portrayed her at her home on the Twin Farms estate in Barnard, Vermont. They married in Barnard in 1943.

== Exhibitions ==
Exhibitions with works by Maxim Kopf

- 1922: Exhibition "April to April" together with "The Pilgrims" in the Art Association for Bohemia (Czech Krasoumná jednota ) in the Rudolfinum Prague
- 1923: Maxim Kopf exhibition together with "The Pilgrims" in the Art Association for Bohemia in Prague
- 1923: Maxim Kopf exhibition together with "The Pilgrims" in Dresden
- 1923: Maxim Kopf's joint exhibition at the Art Association for Bohemia in Prague
- 1926: Exhibition with Mary Duras at the Salon der Independenten in the Grand Palais in Paris
- 1927: Exhibition at the Independent Salon in the Grand Palais in Paris
- 1927: Exhibition of Maxim Kopf and Mary Duras in the Haus der Kunst, Prague
- 1928: Exhibition with the "Young Art" group in the Rudolfinum Prague
- 1928: Exhibition in the Artists' House in Brno
- 1929: I. Exhibition of the Association of Visual Artists "Prague Secession" in the Art Association for Bohemia Prague
- 1930: represented in the exhibition Paintings and Sculptures from Brno Private Collections of the Moravian Art Association in the Brno Artists' House
- 1930: II. Exhibition of the Association of Visual Artists "Prague Secession" in the Art Association for Bohemia Prague
- 1931: Solo exhibition of Maxim Kopf, paintings and drawings in Nuremberg in the German Museum (Sudeten German Art Exhibition)
- 1931: III. Exhibition of the Association of Visual Artists "Prague Secession" in the Art Association for Bohemia Prague
- 1932: Exhibition in Berlin, Hartberg Gallery
- 1932: IV. Exhibition of the Association of Visual Artists "Prague Secession" in the Art Association for Bohemia Prague
- 1933: Exhibition of Willy Nowak, Josef Dobrevsky, Maxim Kopf, Sergius Pauser, Mary Duras, Moravian Art Association, in the Brno Artists' House
- 1933: Fifth exhibition of the Association of Visual Artists "Prague Secession" in the Art Association for Bohemia Prague
- 1934: VI. Exhibition of the Association of Visual Artists "Prague Secession": Pictures from Dalmatia, in the Art Association for Bohemia Prague
- 1935: Special exhibition: Maxim Kopf, Otto Mlčoch, Ilse Pompe, Trude Schmidl-Wähner, Moravian Art Association, in the Künstlerhaus Brno
- 1935: Collective exhibition with Maxim Kopf at the Art Association for Bohemia in Prague
- 1935: VII. Exhibition of the Association of Visual Artists "Prague Secession" in the Art Association for Bohemia Prague
- 1936: VIII exhibition of the Association of Visual Artists "Prague Secession" in the Art Association for Bohemia Prague
- 1937: Maxim Kopf exhibition, at the Art Association for Bohemia, Prague.
- 1937: IX. Exhibition of the Association of Visual Artists "Prague Secession" in the Art Association for Bohemia Prague
- 1937: represented in the exhibition of Czechoslovak art in the USSR (Moscow, Leningrad)
- 1942: Solo exhibition in New York, Wakefield Gallery
- 1943: Solo exhibition in New York with Andre Seligmann
- 1944: Solo exhibition in New York, American British Art Center
- 1947: Solo exhibition in New York, American British Art Center
- 1950: Exhibition of paintings and sculptures by Maxim Kopf in New York, Van Diemen-Lilienfeld Galleries
- 1953: Exhibition of Maxim Kopf's last paintings in New York, John Heller Gallery

== Selected works ==
Maxim Kopf was a cosmopolitan painter whose works can be found in Europe and the USA.

- Crucifixion (1920), Liberec Regional Gallery
- The Pilgrim (1920), National Gallery Prague
- Conception (1920–21), National Gallery Prague
- Buddha (1920), Liberec Regional Gallery
- Religious Theme (1924), Narodní památkový ústav (NPÚ) Prague, Hořovice Castle
- After the bath (1930), private collection
- View of Prague (1937), Gallery of the Capital Prague
- Vision (1920), National Gallery Prague
- Lovers (1925), Gallery Zlatá Husa Prague
- Portrait of the sculptor Mary Duras at work (1928), Kunstforum Ostdeutsche Galerie Regensburg
- Dance Bar (1920), Liberec Regional Gallery
- Tupuraa, Tahiti (1934), private collection
- Tahiti (1934), Zlatá Husa Gallery Prague
- Times Square (1924), National Gallery Prague
- Columbus Circle (1924–25) (lost)
- Holy Communion (1921)
- Montrouge (1927)
- Portrait of Mary Duras (1928)
- Falkenau coal mine (1929)
- Self-Portrait (1929), Kunstforum Ostdeutsche Galerie Regensburg
- Tahitian women
- New York (1941–42)
- The Beachcomber
- Farewell (The Farewell)

A large number of his works were represented at art auctions.

== Collections ==
Works by Maxim Kopf are represented in the following collections:

- Everson Museum of Art
- Hood Museum of Art
- Memorial Art Gallery
- Brooklyn Museum of Art
- Museum of Modern Art in New York
- Saint Louis Art Museum
- National Gallery Prague
- Liberec Regional Gallery
- Moravian Gallery in Brno

== Miscellaneous ==
Kopf created an Ex Libris (bookplate) for Dorothy Thompson . It shows a female figure walking over a devil figure, carrying a book in her raised hands.

== Works cited ==
- Anna Habánová: Mladí lvi v kleci - Umělecké skupiny německy hovořících výtvarníků z Čech, Moravy a Slezska v meziválečném období (Young lions in the cage - artist groups of German-speaking artists from Bohemia, Moravia and Silesia in the interwar period). Arbor Vitae Řevnice, Liberec Regional Gallery, 2013, ISBN 978-80-87707-00-5, pp. 438 pages.
- Anna Habánová: Dějiny uměleckého spolku Metznerbund v Čechách 1920–1945 (history of the Metznerbund art association in Bohemia 1920–1945), Technical University of Liberec, 2017, ISBN 978-80-7494-322-5, 368 pages.
- M. Knedlik: Head, Maxim . In: General artist lexicon . The visual artists of all times and peoples (AKL). Volume 81, de Gruyter, Berlin 2014, ISBN 978-3-11-023186-1, p. 295 f.
- Anna Habánová: Liberec jako centrum německo-českého výtvarného umění v první polovině 20. století (Reichenberg as a center of German-Bohemian fine art in the first half of the 20th century). Dissertation, Masarykova univerzita Brno, 2012, 241 pages, as a PDF file, accessed on 1 September 2023 (in Czech)
- Ivo Habán: Fenomén německo-českého výtvarného umění 20. století The Pilgrims, Young Art, Prague Secession. Pražská scéna a paralelní centra německy hovořících umělců v meziválečném Československu (The phenomenon of German-Czech visual art of the 20th century - The Pilgrims, Young Art, Prague Secession - The Prague scene and parallel centers of German-speaking artists in interwar Czechoslovakia). Dissertation, Masarykova univerzita Brno, 2012, 257 pages, as a PDF file, accessed on 1 September 2023 (in Czech)
