= Max Oppenheimer (artist) =

Austrian painter (1885–1954)

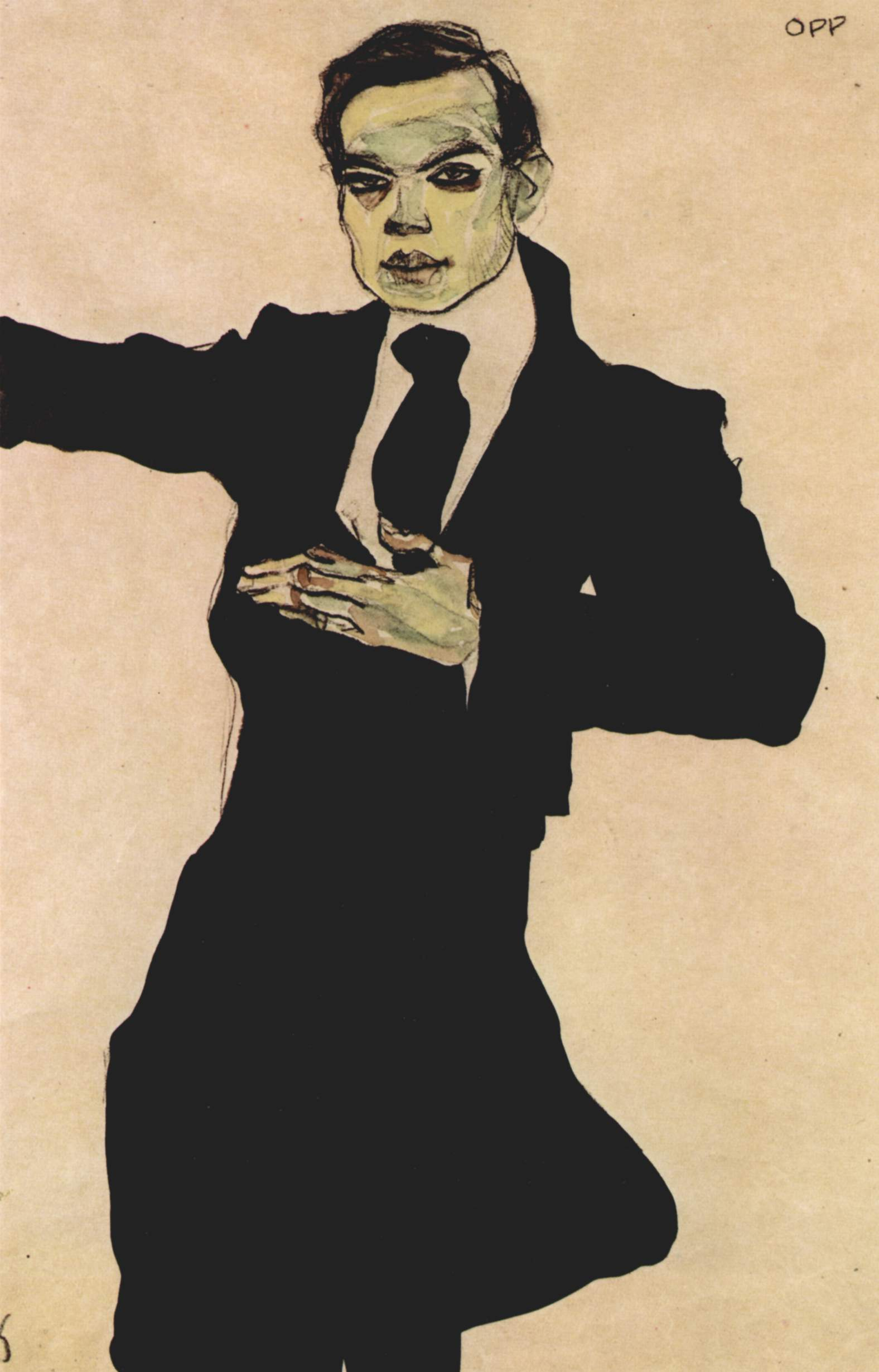
- Portrait of Oppenheimer by Egon Schiele (1910)
- Born: 1 July 1885; Vienna, Austria
- Died: 19 May 1954 (aged 68); New York City, US

Max Oppenheimer (1 July 1885 – 19 May 1954), later known as MOPP, was an Austrian painter and graphic artist.

== Life ==
Oppenheimer was born in Vienna on 1 July 1885. He studied from 1900 to 1903 at the Akademie der Bildenden Künste there under Christian Griepenkerl and Siegmund L'Allemand, and then – from 1903 to 1906 – at the Academy of Fine Arts in Prague, under Franz Thiele. Along with Egon Schiele, with whom he shared a studio in 1910 and Oskar Kokoschka he was considered as being one of Austria's leading avant-garde artists. His work was influenced by several movements including expressionism, cubism and futurism. His work was included in two art exhibitions in 1908 and 1909 in Vienna co-organised by Gustav Klimt. His first one-man show was held in Munich at the Moderne Galerie in 1910. He was known for his portraits of contemporary cultural figures such as Thomas Mann and Arnold Schoenberg.

Between 1915 and 1925, Oppenheimer lived mainly in Switzerland, then Germany, before returning to Vienna. With the invasion of Austria by Germany in 1938, Oppenheimer fled to the United States. He died in New York City in 1954.
