= Adolf Schlabitz =

German painter (1854–1943)

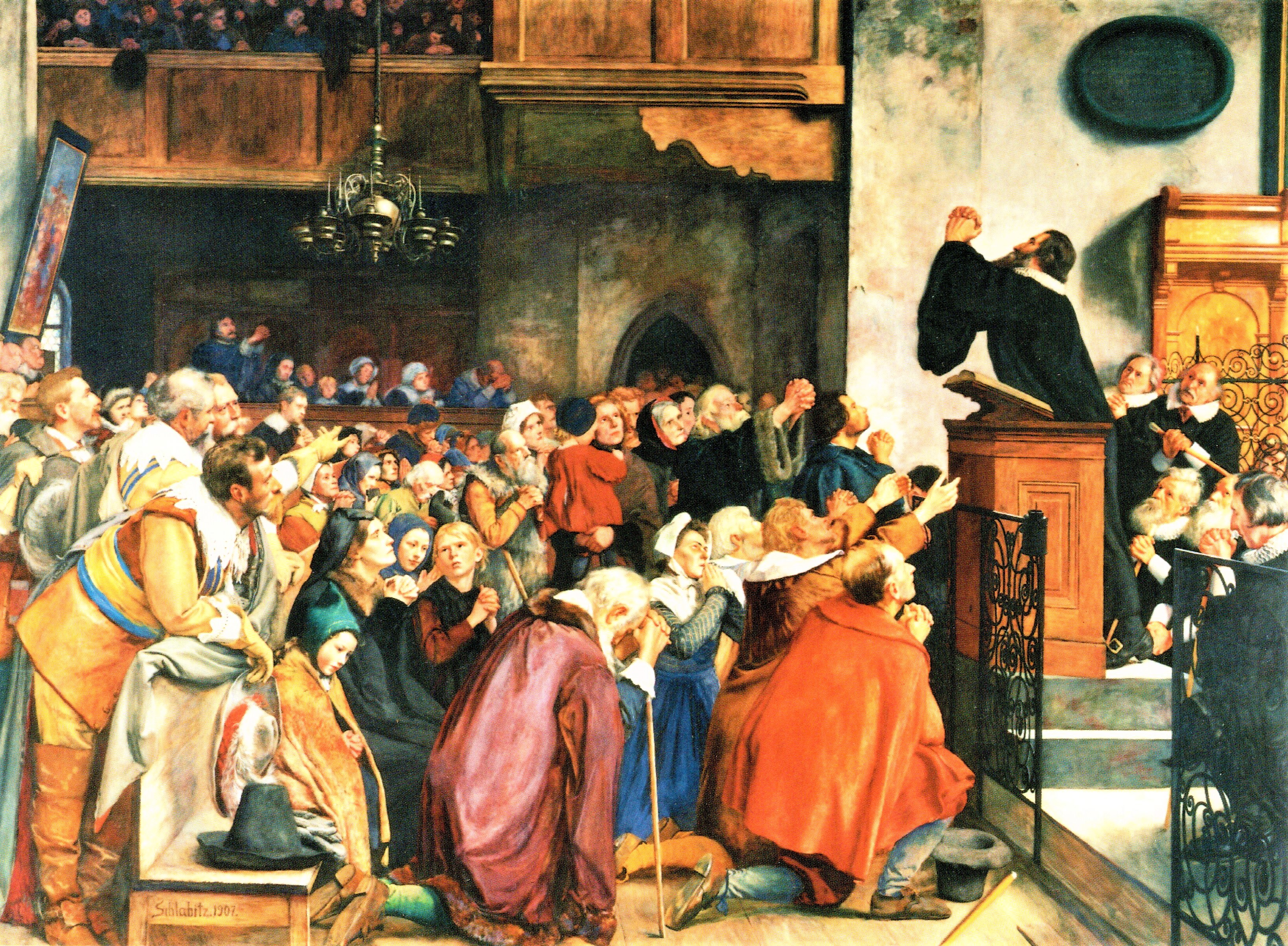
Martin Rinckart's Rogation Service (1907)

Adolf Gustav Schlabitz (7 June 1854 – 4 September 1943) was a German portrait and genre painter.

== Life and work ==
He was born in Groß Wartenberg as the second child of a soap maker. From 1875 to 1882, he was enrolled at the Prussian Academy of Arts, where he studied with Paul Thumann, Otto Knille, Karl Gussow and Ernst Hildebrand, among others. With the help of a scholarship, awarded for his painting of a trial in the Breslau District Court, he was able to continue his studies at the Académie Julian in Paris, with Jules-Joseph Lefebvre and Gustave Boulanger. This was followed by study trips to several locations in Europe and the United States.

Upon returning to Germany, he lived in Munich for three years, then opened a private art school in Berlin. By 1901, he was able to afford a house in Brixlegg, which he used as a summer retreat. In 1907, he created a monumental mural, depicting a scene from the life of Martin Rinckart, for the Martin-Rinckart-Gymnasium (formerly the Royal Gymnasium) in Eilenburg,

He also worked as an assistant to Ernst Henseler at Technische Hochschule Berlin (today Technische Universität Berlin), until 1908. At that time, he took a position as assistant in the drawing classes of Ernst Hancke (1834–1914), at what is now the Berlin University of the Arts. In 1911, at the request of Anton von Werner, he was named a Professor. During the course of his teaching career, which lasted until 1918, he had several students who would become notable, such as Lyonel Feininger, Albert Windisch, Alexander Kolde, Ernst Lübbert and August Brömse. He was also a member of the Prussian Academy and the Verein Berliner Künstler. In addition to his painting, he was an avid collector of folk art.

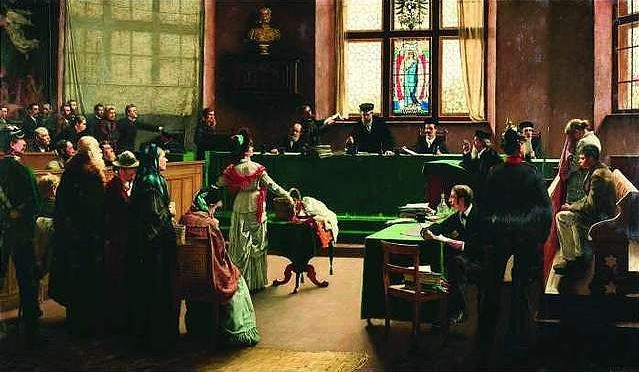
Trial in the Jury Room of the Breslau District Court

In 1921, he retired and took up permanent residence at his house in Brixlegg. In 1935, he joined the Ateliergemeinschaft Klosterstraße, a service of the Reichskulturkammer, which provided studio space for approved artists. At eighty-one, he was its oldest member. He died at his home in 1943, aged eighty-nine, and was interred in Groß Wartenberg.
