= Dorothy Thompson =

American journalist and radio broadcaster (1893–1961)

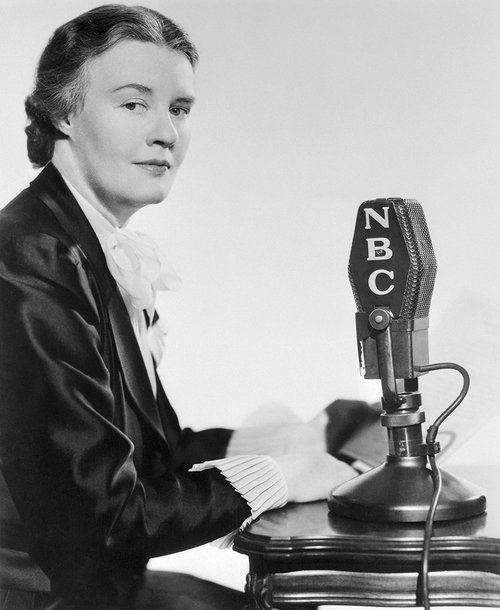
- Thompson in 1937
- Born: Dorothy Celene Thompson; July 9, 1893; Lancaster, New York, U.S.
- Died: January 30, 1961 (aged 67); Lisbon, Portugal
- Education: Lewis Institute; Syracuse University (BA)
- Spouses: Joseph Bard (m. 1923; div. 1927) Sinclair Lewis (m. 1928; div. 1942) Maxim Kopf (m. 1943; died 1958)
- Children: 2

Dorothy Celene Thompson (July 9, 1893 – January 30, 1961) was an American journalist and radio broadcaster. She was the first American journalist to be expelled from Nazi Germany, in 1934, and was one of the few women news commentators broadcasting on radio during the 1930s. Thompson is regarded by some as the "First Lady of American Journalism" and was recognized by Time magazine in 1939 as equal in influence to Eleanor Roosevelt. Recordings of her NBC Radio commentary and analysis of the European situation and the start of World War II (from August 23 to September 6, 1939) were selected by the Library of Congress for preservation in the National Recording Registry in 2023, based on their "cultural, historical or aesthetic importance in the nation’s recorded sound heritage."

== Life and career ==
Dorothy Thompson was born in Lancaster, New York, in 1893, the eldest of three children of Peter (1863–1921) and Margaret Thompson (née Grierson; 1873–1901). Her siblings were Peter Willard Thompson (1895–1979) and Margaret Thompson (1897–1970; later, Margaret Wilson). Her mother died when Thompson was seven, leaving Peter, a Methodist minister, to raise their children alone. Their father soon remarried; Dorothy did not get along with his new wife, Elizabeth Abbott Thompson.

In 1908, her father sent Thompson to Chicago to live with his two sisters to avoid further conflict. In Chicago, she attended Lewis Institute for two years and earned an associate degree before transferring to Syracuse University as a junior. At Syracuse, she studied politics and economics and graduated cum laude with a bachelor's degree in 1914. Because she had had the opportunity to be educated, unlike many women of the time, Thompson felt that she had a social obligation to fight for women's suffrage in the United States, which would become the base of her ardent political beliefs. Shortly after graduation, Thompson moved to Buffalo, New York, and became involved in the women's suffrage campaign. During her time in the suffrage movement, Thompson also did advertising and publicity work in New York City and contributed op-eds on social justice to The New York Times and the New York Herald Tribune. In 1920, she went abroad to pursue journalism.

=== Journalism in Europe ===
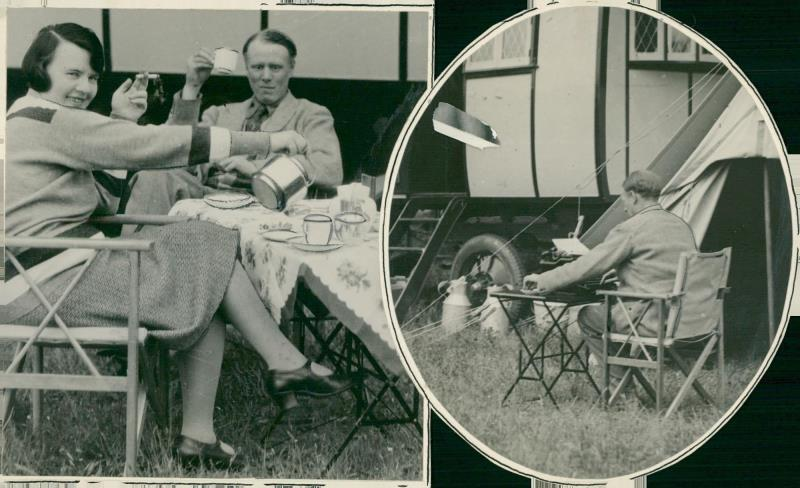
Sinclair Lewis and Thompson during their honeymoon caravan trip in England, 1928

Thompson boarded a ship to London in June 1920 to become a foreign correspondent, submitting articles to William Randolph Hearst's International News Service (INS). Ireland was in political ferment, so she went there; on August 12, she was the final person to interview the Sinn Féin independence leader Terence MacSwiney, who later that day was arrested for sedition. He died in prison on a hunger strike two months later. The interview was sent by INS to American newspapers and led to Thompson being appointed Austria correspondent for the Philadelphia Public Ledger.

While working in Vienna, Thompson became fluent in German. She met and worked alongside correspondents John Gunther and George Eric Rowe Gedye. In 1925, she was promoted to Chief of the Central European Service for the Public Ledger. She resigned in 1927 and, not long after, the New York Evening Post appointed her head of its Berlin bureau. In Germany, she witnessed firsthand the rise of the Nazi Party. According to her biographer, Peter Kurth, Thompson was "the undisputed queen of the overseas press corps, the first woman to head a foreign news bureau of any importance".

During this time Thompson cultivated many literary friends, particularly among exiled German authors. Among her acquaintances from this period were Ödön von Horváth, Thomas Mann, Bertolt Brecht, Stefan Zweig and Fritz Kortner. She developed a close friendship with author Carl Zuckmayer. In Berlin she got involved in a lesbian affair with German author Christa Winsloe while still married, claiming "the right to love".

Thompson's most significant work abroad took place in Germany in the early 1930s. In Munich, Thompson met and interviewed Adolf Hitler for the first time in 1931. This would be the basis for her subsequent book, I Saw Hitler, in which she wrote about the dangers of him winning power in Germany. Later, in a Harper's Magazine article in December 1934, Thompson described Hitler in the following terms: "He is formless, almost faceless, a man whose countenance is a caricature, a man whose framework seems cartilaginous, without bones. He is inconsequent and voluble, ill poised [sic] and insecure. He is the very prototype of the little man." Kurth wrote:

Later, when the full force of Nazism had crashed over Europe, Thompson was asked to defend her "Little Man" remark. "I still believe he is a little man," she replied. "He is the apotheosis of the little man." Nazism itself was "the apotheosis of collective mediocrity in all its forms."

=== Expulsion from Germany ===
Fellow correspondent and friend William L. Shirer once commented on Thompson's "love for Germany, which was passionate but—as she wrote once—frustrated." Her anti-Nazi journalism and, in particular, her depiction of Hitler in her book I Saw Hitler led to her becoming the first American journalist to be expelled from Germany. On August 25, 1934, she received the expulsion order, delivered by a Gestapo agent to her hotel room in the Hotel Adlon, Berlin. She was given 24 hours to leave the country. Thompson did so on August 26. Numerous journalists gathered to see her off at the train station, and they gave her bunches of American Beauty roses to show their solidarity.

Thompson's expulsion received extensive international attention, including a front-page story in the New York Times. Peter Kurth said, "Her expulsion from Berlin had turned her overnight into a kind of heroine – a celebrity of note, the dramatic embodiment of the nascent war against fascism."

=== At the New York Herald-Tribune ===
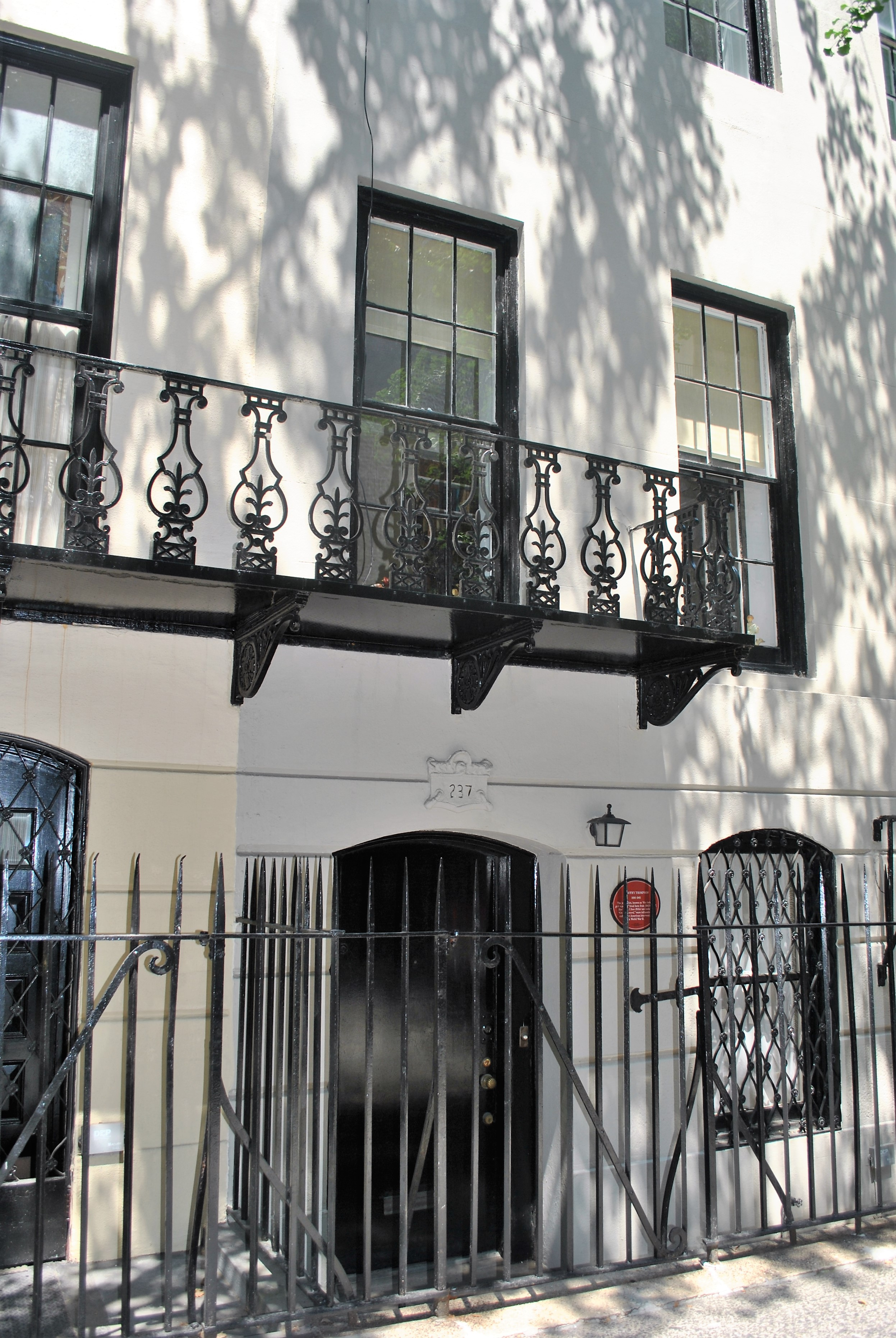
Dorothy Thompson House, New York City, New York

In 1936, Thompson began to write "On the Record", a New York Herald Tribune newspaper column that was also syndicated nationwide. It was read by over ten million people and carried by more than 170 papers. With a new column appearing three times a week, the feature lasted, uninterrupted, for 22 years.

She also wrote a monthly column for the Ladies' Home Journal for 24 years, from 1937 to 1961. Its topics were far removed from war and politics, focusing on gardening, children, art, and other domestic and women's interest topics.

=== Radio and the Herschel Grynszpan affair ===
Around the time she started writing "On the Record", NBC hired Thompson as a news commentator. Her radio broadcasts on the network from 1936 to 1938 became some of the most popular in the United States, making her one of the most sought-after female public speakers of her time. When Nazi Germany invaded Poland in 1939, Thompson went on the air for fifteen consecutive days and nights.

In 1938, Thompson championed the cause of a Polish-German Jewish teenager named Herschel Grynszpan, whose assassination of a minor German diplomat, Ernst vom Rath, in Paris had been used as propaganda to trigger the events of Kristallnacht in Germany by the Nazis. Thompson's broadcast on NBC radio was heard by millions of listeners, and it led to an outpouring of sympathy for the young assassin. Under the banner of the Journalists' Defense Fund, more than US$40,000 (equivalent to $914,894 in 2025) was collected, enabling the famous European lawyer Vincent de Moro-Giafferi to take up Grynszpan's case.

=== Fame and controversy ===
By 1939, Thompson was one of the most respected women of her age, and as a result, she was featured on the cover of Time along with a picture of her speaking into an NBC radio microphone, captioned, "she rides in the smoking car". The article declared that "she and Eleanor Roosevelt are undoubtedly the most influential women in the U.S." and explained Thompson's influence: "Dorothy Thompson is the U.S. clubwoman's woman. She is read, believed and quoted by millions of women who used to get their political opinions from their husbands, who got them from Walter Lippmann." In Woman of the Year (1942), Katharine Hepburn played Tess Harding, a foreign correspondent modeled on Thompson. The 1981 Broadway musical adaptation starred Lauren Bacall as Tess.

During the 1936 United States presidential election, Thompson characterized Black voters as a bloc that was "notoriously venal. Ignorant and illiterate, the vast mass of Negroes are like the lower strata of the early industrial immigrants, and like them, they are 'bossed' and 'delivered' in blocs by venal leaders, both white and black."

In 1941, Thompson wrote "Who Goes Nazi?" for Harper's. Instead of presenting the likelihood of a person adopting Nazism in racial or ethnic terms, she thought of it in terms of character qualities that could be found in any group of people.

=== Zionism and the State of Israel ===
Thompson had been sympathetic to the Zionist movement since she first travelled to Europe in 1920. During her visit, she had "endless discussions" about the movement with delegates who were traveling to the International Zionist Conference being held in London. In the late 1930s, as Thompson emerged as a leading advocate for Jewish refugees who were fleeing from persecution in Europe, she grew close to the Zionist statesman Chaim Weizmann and to Meyer Weisgal, Weizmann's lieutenant in the US. As World War II unfolded, Thompson went from being a sympathetic commentator to being an outright advocate for the movement. She was a keynote speaker at the 1942 Biltmore Conference, and by the war's end, she was regarded as one of Zionism's most effective spokespersons.

However, Thompson's attitude toward the movement began to shift, especially after a 1945 trip to Palestine, as she grew more concerned about the activities of the movement's right-wing adherents. She was especially troubled by escalating Zionist political violence. After penning several columns which were critical of right-wing Zionist terrorism, Thompson provoked a tremendous backlash that ultimately led her to cooperate with the leaders of the Jewish anti-Zionist organization, the American Council for Judaism.

She wrote a critique of American Zionism in Commentary in 1950, accusing Zionists of dual loyalty. A response in the magazine by Oscar Handlin criticised her "totalitarian" understanding of national identity in demanding single loyalty. After her Commentary article, the backlash against her grew more intense. This included accusations of antisemitism, which Thompson strongly rebuffed, after being warned that hostility toward Israel was, in the American press world, "almost a definition of professional suicide." (Note: Maguire, Gil (April 28, 2015), "Obama's role model to journalists – Dorothy Thompson – turned against Zionism and was silenced US Politics". Mondoweiss. Quotations: "As Thompson began to increase her criticism of Zionist policies, she was shunned by the Jewish community and by many of her life-long Jewish friends [...]" - "Thompson’s editors warned her that in the American press a hostility toward Israel was “almost a definition of professional suicide.” Nonetheless, she would not be intimidated and said, “I refuse to become an anti-Semite by appointment”, and refused “to yield to this type of blackmail.” The campaign against her strengthened and she began to be dropped from other papers. Her once-lucrative speaking career began to dry up because of the organized campaign to label her as an anti-Semite, a label that stuck for the rest of her career.") She eventually concluded that Zionism was a recipe for perpetual war. As Thompson's distance from the Zionist movement grew, she became an advocate for Palestinian refugees. After she travelled to the Middle East in 1950, Thompson was involved in the founding of the American Friends of the Middle East, an organization which was secretly funded by the CIA.

Lyndsey Stonebridge wrote in 2017:

There can be no doubt that anti-Semitism was a theme in Thompson’s later writing. Pathologizing Jewishness, in particular, became habitual for her in the 1950s. By May 25, 1950, she is writing to Maury M. Travis, darkly, of the "tragic psychosis of the Jew"... In the Commentary piece she warns: "We bring on what we fear. Any psychologist will tell you that a primary neurosis is the fear of rejection and that when that neurosis takes hold of a person he unconsciously strives to create the conditions for that rejection." The reference is to Jewish "neurosis," but the passage also rather elegantly describes the logic of Thompson’s own fears. In what well may be a case of knowing your addressee, Thompson wrote to Winston Churchill in 1951: "I have become convinced that the Jews, phenomenally brilliant individually and especially in the realm of abstract thought, are collectively the stupidest people on earth. I think it must come from cultural inbreeding—perhaps physical inbreeding also—in a desire to retain a homogeneous, in-group society in the midst of 'aliens.'"

== Personal life ==
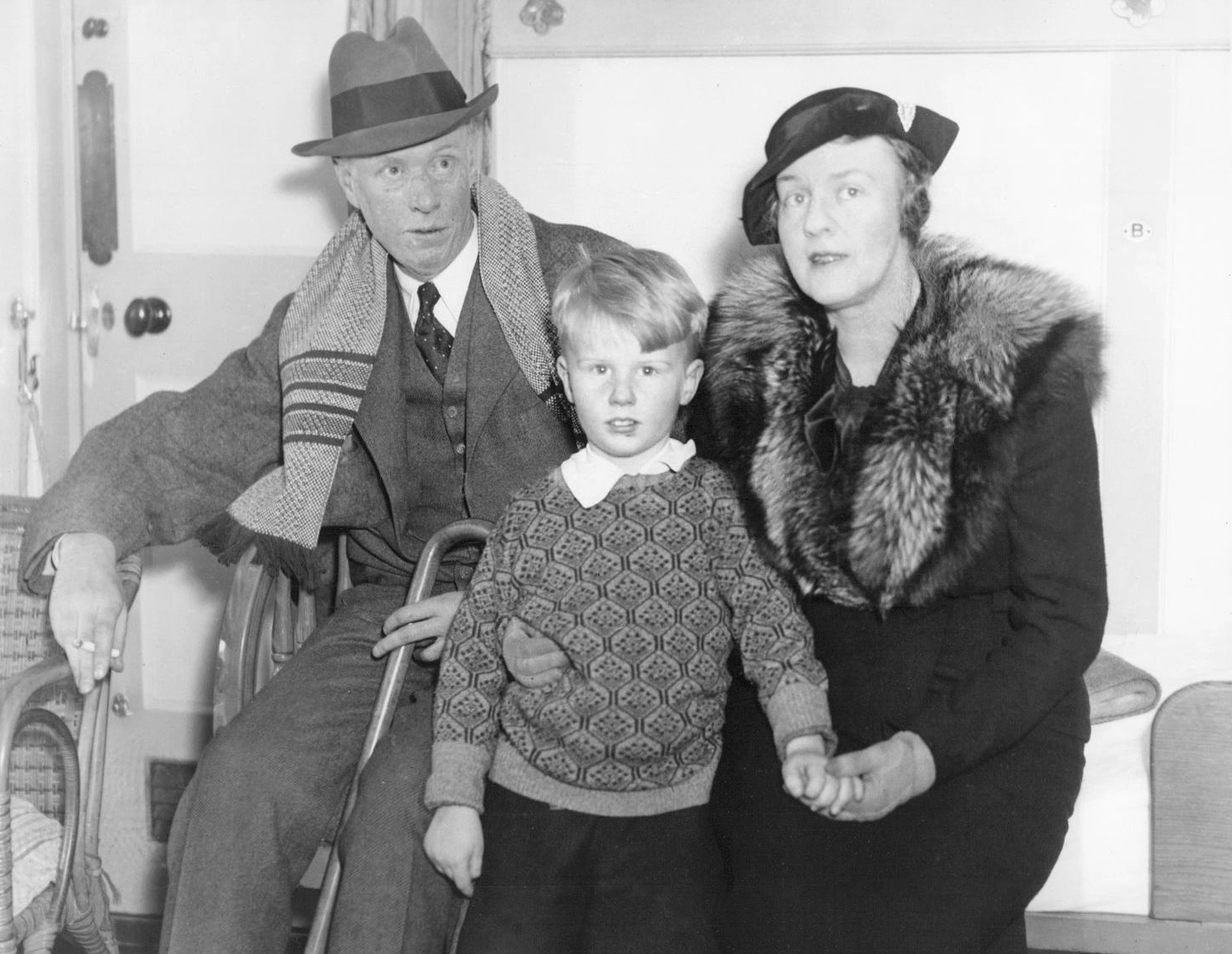
Thompson with Lewis and son in 1935

She was married three times, most notably to her second husband, the Nobel Prize in Literature winner Sinclair Lewis. In 1923, she married her first husband, Hungarian Joseph Bard; they divorced in 1927.

Thompson met Lewis on July 8, 1927, at an afternoon tea at the German Foreign Ministry in Berlin, held by German Foreign Minister Gustav Stresemann. The two arranged a dinner the following day, which was both Dorothy's 34th birthday and the day when her divorce from Bard was finalized.

In 1928, she married Lewis and acquired a house in Vermont. They had one son, Michael Lewis, born in 1930. The couple divorced in 1942.

She married her third husband, the artist Maxim Kopf, in 1943, and their marriage lasted until Kopf's death in 1958.

Thompson died in 1961, at the age of 67, in Lisbon, Portugal, and she is buried in the town cemetery of Barnard, Vermont.

== In popular culture ==
The character of Tess Harding, played by Katharine Hepburn in the film Woman of the Year (1942), was loosely based on Dorothy Thompson.

Her marriage to Sinclair Lewis was the subject of Sherman Yellen's Broadway play Strangers, where she was played by Lois Nettleton. The play opened on March 4, 1979, and closed after nine performances.

In the 2019–2023 TV series World on Fire, the character of Nancy Campbell, played by Helen Hunt, was loosely based on Dorothy Thompson's experience as a broadcaster in Berlin.

In the 2023 novel The War Begins in Paris by Theodore Wheeler, a fictional version of Thompson makes several cameos in scenes that depict American journalists who are covering the start of World War II from Paris.

== Works ==
- 1928: The New Russia (Holt)
- 1932: I Saw Hitler! (Farrar and Rinehart)
- 1935: Maps
- 1938: Dorothy Thompson's Political Guide: A Study of American Liberalism and Its Relationship to Modern Totalitarian States (Stackpole)
- 1938: Refugees: Anarchy or Organization? (Random House)
- 1937: Concerning Vermont
- 1939: Once on Christmas (Oxford University Press)
- 1939: Let the Record Speak (Houghton Mifflin)
- 1939: Christian Ethics and Western Civilization
- 1941: A Call to Action, Ring of Freedom
- 1941: Our Lives, Fortunes, and Sacred Honor
- 1941: Who Goes Nazi?
- 1942: Listen, Hans (Houghton Mifflin)
- 1944: To Whom Does the Earth Belong?
- 1945: I Speak Again as a Christian
- 1946: Let the Promise Be Fulfilled: A Christian View of Palestine
- 1948: The Truth About Communism (Washington: Public Affairs Press)
- 1948: The Developments of Our Times
- 1955: The Crisis of the West
- 1957: The Courage to Be Happy (Houghton Mifflin)

== See also ==
- List of suffragists and suffragettes
- List of women's rights activists
- Timeline of women's suffrage

== Bibliography ==
- Brownfeld, Allan (1987). "Anti-Semitism: Its Changing Meaning". Journal of Palestine Studies. 16 (3): 53–67.
