= Ludwig Michalek =

Austrian painter (1859–1942)

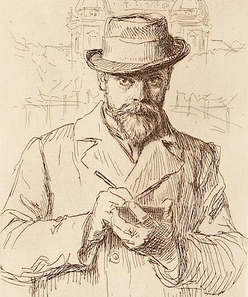
Self-portrait (1899)

Ludwig Michalek (13 April 1859 – 24 September 1942) was an Austrian portrait painter, graphic artist and copper engraver.

== Life and work ==
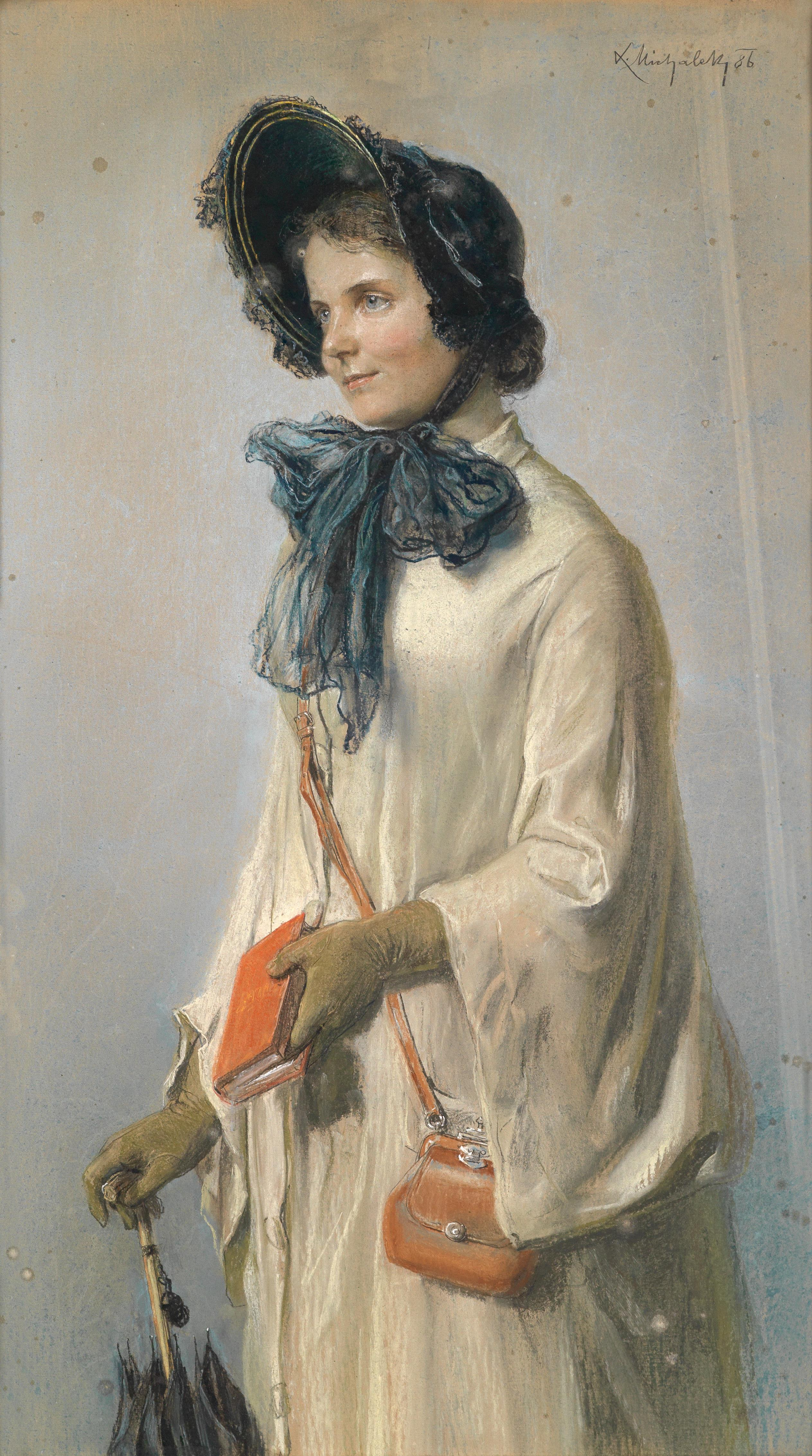
Travelling

Michalek was born on 13 April 1859 in Temesvár, Kingdom of Hungary, Austrian Empire (now Timișoara, Romania). His father was a railroad engineer. In 1873, after graduating from the Realschule in Brno, he became a student at the Academy of Fine Arts, Vienna, where his primary instructors were August Eisenmenger, Christian Griepenkerl and Carl Wurzinger. This was followed, in 1876, by studies with the graphic artist, Louis Jacoby. Numerous study trips took him to Italy, France, the Low Countries and Germany.

He married the pianist, Lili Bailetti, in 1883. They had two daughters. From 1884 to 1887, he worked as an assistant at the Vienna Academy; in the classes for "Drawing from Life". He received an "honorable mention" at the Paris Salon in 1888, and a gold medal at the Große Berliner Kunstausstellung in 1896. The following year, he was one of the founders of the etching classes at the new Vienna Women's Academy where, after 1898, he also taught the classes for nude drawing and nature studies.

In 1909, the Ministry of Labor appointed him a Professor at the Higher Federal Institution for Graphic Education and Research. He held that position until 1920, but also gave secondary courses in etching at the "Frauenkunstschule" (Women's Art School), a division of the Academy. He was a long-time member of the Vienna Künstlerhaus and, in 1936, was awarded their Silver Jubilee Medal.

He is best remembered for several series of etchings and engravings; depicting composers, poets, scenery, technical subjects, and various things relating to the Austrian Alpine railways. He also made reproductions of the old masters, as well as portraits of contemporary notables, rendered in pastels.

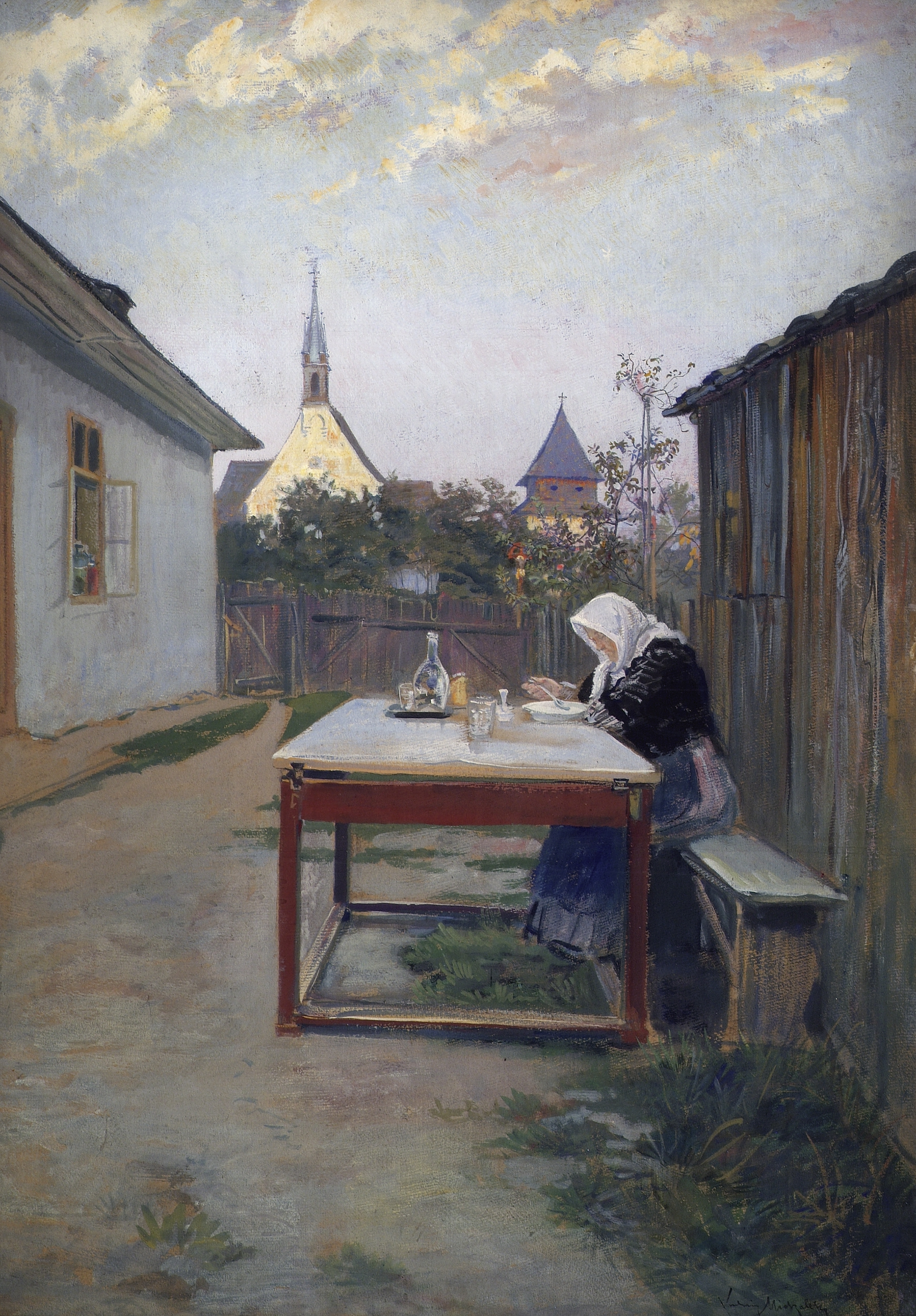
My Mother (Evening Mealtime)

He died on 24 September 1942, Vienna, aged 83. Two months after his death, his estate was put up for auction at the Dorotheum. In 1943, a street in Vienna's Ottakring district was named after him.
