= Who Goes Nazi? =

1941 essay by Dorothy Thompson

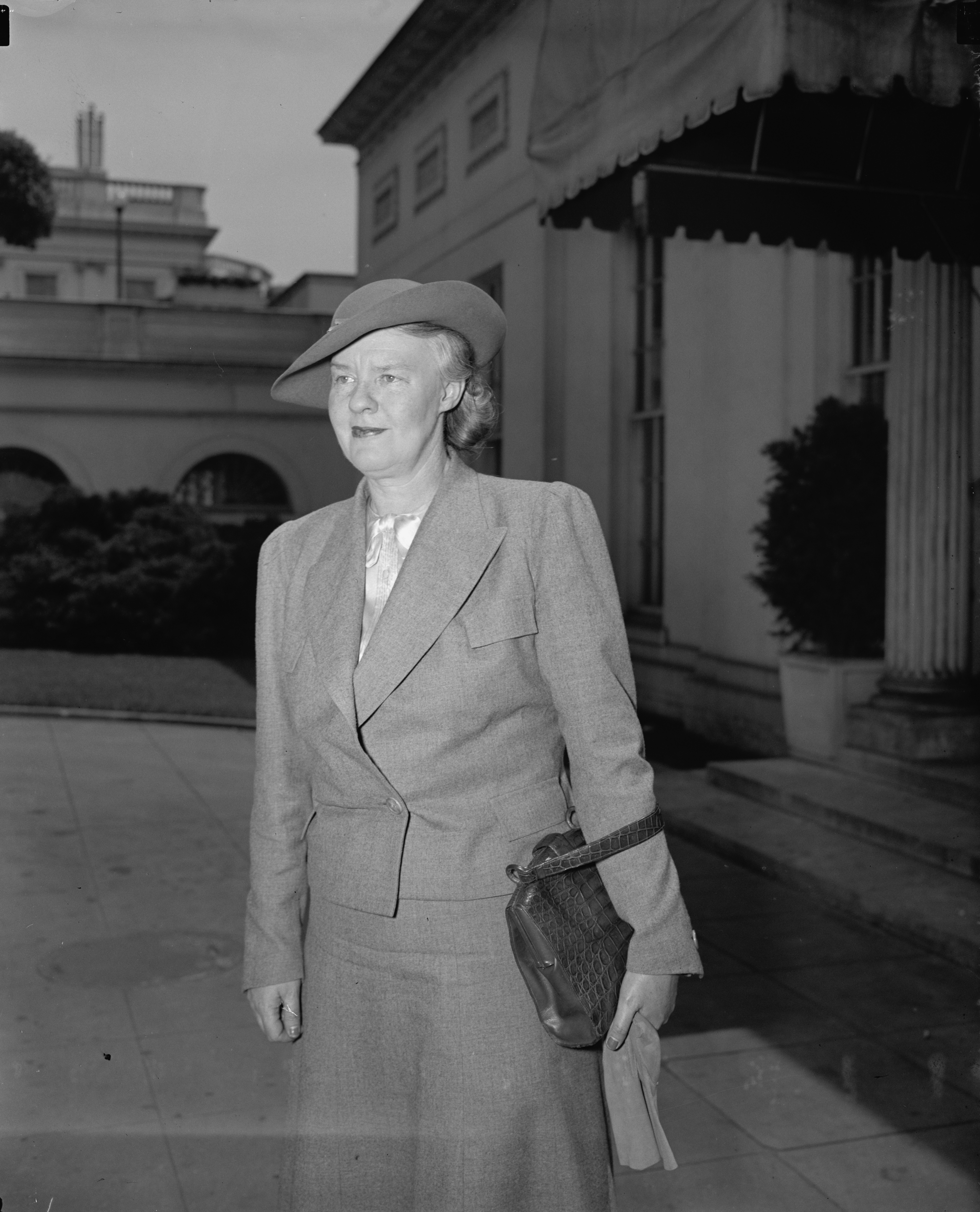
"Who Goes Nazi?" author Dorothy Thompson in 1940

"Who Goes Nazi?" is an essay by American journalist Dorothy Thompson originally published in the August 1941 issue of Harper's Magazine. The essay examines a series of fictional characters who possess varying personalities, social statuses, and upbringings, and attempts to determine whether they would "go Nazi" – that is, whether they would support a mainstream Nazi political movement despite not subscribing to a Nazi or otherwise fascistic ideology.

== Summary ==
Thompson frames the essay as a "somewhat macabre parlor game", wherein one privately speculates which attendees at a social gathering could conceivably "go Nazi" under the proper political or social circumstances. She posits that support for Nazism is not formed on the basis of class, nationality, or race, but that the ideology "appeals to a certain type of mind".

She demonstrates the game by describing the well-heeled attendees of an imagined party, the majority of whom are denoted by letters. Characters such as "Mr. C", a socially alienated Wall Street advisor who in school "took all the scholastic honors but was never invited to join a fraternity", would go Nazi so that he could "rise to such an eminence that no one can ever again humiliate him", while subservient antifeminist "Mrs. E" would go Nazi for a politician "who proclaims the basic subordination of women".

Thompson concludes that individuals most likely to go Nazi are those who are ruthless and cerebral, are embittered by their circumstances, are easily deceived, and/or would opportunistically seek to be close to power if Nazism was ascendant, summarizing that "the frustrated and humiliated intellectual, the rich and scared speculator, the spoiled son, the labor tyrant, the fellow who has achieved success by smelling out the wind of success—they would all go Nazi in a crisis".

== Reception ==
"Who Goes Nazi?" is regarded as one of Thompson's most influential essays, with Nick Martin of The New Republic writing that "eight decades later, Thompson's inquiry still has the media industry in knots". The essay has been praised for its continued political relevance, with Harper's re-publishing "Who Goes Nazi?" in 2017 and noting that it is "unfortunately [...] starting to feel new again". The essay has received a mixed reception among right-wing commentators; conservative journalist James Kirchick praised the essay in Tablet as a "timeless analysis of the authoritarian mentality" and "disturbingly relevant reading today", while Scott Beauchamp of The American Conservative criticized it as the "ur-text of fascist paranoia" and an example of the conflation of all conservative ideology with Nazism.

The essay has been referenced by contemporary media outlets in coverage of the 2016 United States presidential election and the Unite the Right rally, as well in commentary on the alt-right and other far-right movements more broadly. Tributes and parodies of the essay have been published in Current Affairs, Tablet, and The Outline.
