= Moritz Coschell =

Austrian painter and illustrator

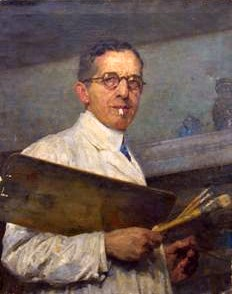
Self-portrait (date unknown)

Moritz Coschell, originally Moritz Kocheles (18 September 1872, Vienna – 11 July 1943, Vienna) was an Austrian painter and illustrator of Jewish ancestry.

== Biography ==
He was born to Leo Kocheles and his wife, Frumet née Stolzberg. The family name was officially changed to Coschell in 1896. He began his studies at the Vienna School of Arts and Crafts, with the sculptor Anton Brenek. Following that, he attended the Academy of Fine Arts, where his primary instructors were Franz Rumpler and August Eisenmenger. He also studied with Albert Windisch at the Städelschule in Frankfurt. After 1899, he was based in Berlin, and soon became a popular portrait painter among the upper classes. His first major showing was at the Große Berliner Kunstausstellung in 1900. He would continue to exhibit there regularly until 1926.

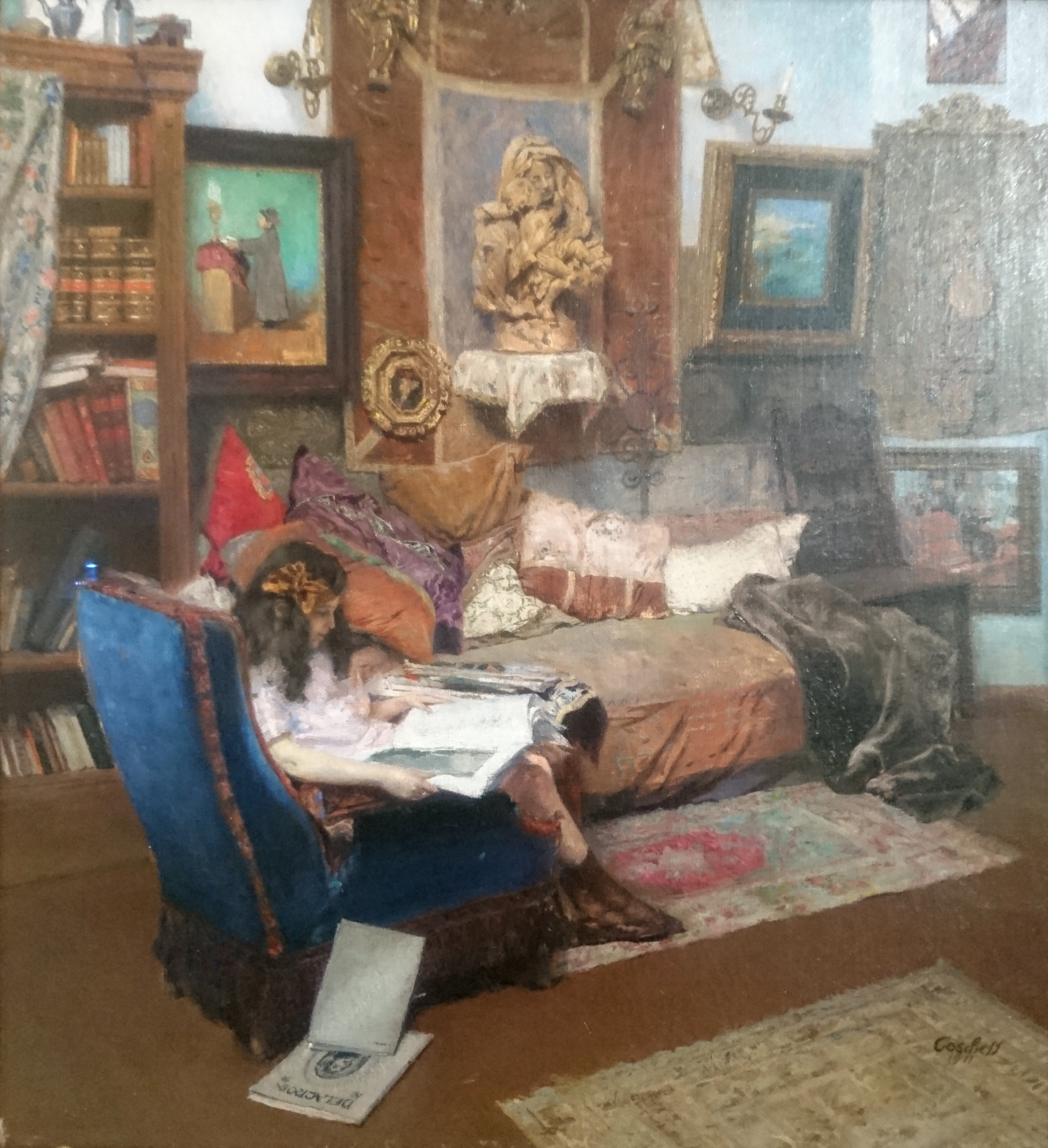
Reading in the Studio

During World War I, he served as a Hauptmann in the Austrian Army. In 1921, he married Lucy Agnes Emma Wiskott, a banker's daughter, from Dortmund. They had one son. He and Lucy were both members of a Protestant church but, due to his Jewish origins, his professional license was withdrawn in 1933. Soon after, his works were declared to be "degnerate", and he had no source of income. He took Lucy and his son to Dortmund, to live with Lucy's father. He was unable to live with them, due to certain provisions in the anti-Semitic Nuremberg Laws, so that failed to improve their situation. When stricter laws kept him from visiting them, he returned to Vienna, alone.

There, he was able to maintain a studio and enjoy a modest income, until the Anschluss in 1938. A Badge of Merit, awarded for his military service, was all that prevented his immediate "deportation" to a Nazi ghetto. By late 1939, he and Lucy were considering suicide. Instead, he began making efforts to emigrate to the United States; going so far as to seek assistance from Thomas Mann and the art dealer, Karl Nierendorf; all of which proved futile.

Eventually, his struggles and deprivation made him seriously ill, and he died in a provisional Jewish hospital, operated by a Talmud Torah school. Thanks to a letter from a friend, Lucy was able to visit him before he died. His son, Joachim, classified as a "Half-Jew", was drafted into a labor battalion and died while repairing a bridge in France.

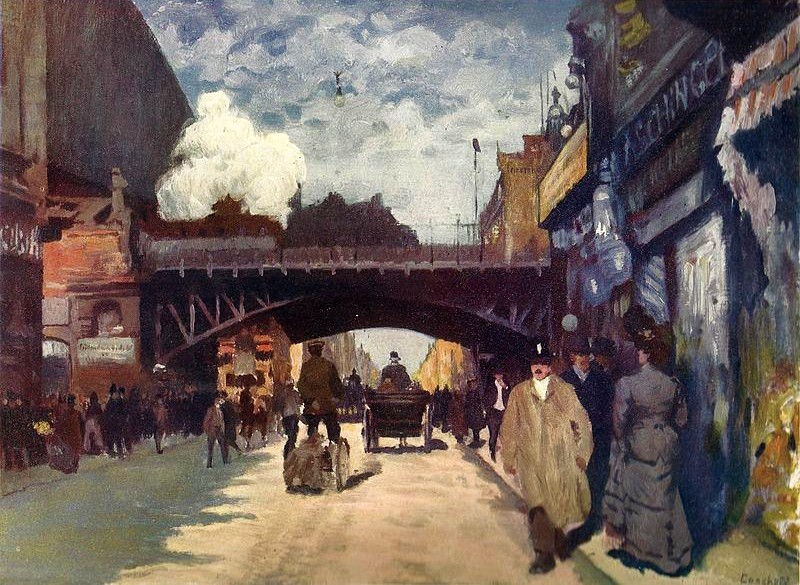
Friedrichstraße, Berlin

His works may be seen at the Musée d'Art et d'Histoire du Judaïsme in Paris, the Museum für Kunst und Kulturgeschichte and the Museum Ostwall in Dortmund, and the Märkisches Museum, Berlin. In addition to painting, he worked as an illustrator; providing drawings for the Berliner Illustrirte Zeitung as well as Le Figaro, among others. His most familiar book illustrations are those for Leutnant Gustl, a novella by Arthur Schnitzler.

== Sources ==
- (in German) Dankmar Trier: Coschell, Moritz. In: Allgemeines Künstlerlexikon. Die Bildenden Künstler aller Zeiten und Völker (AKL). Band 21, Saur, München u. a. 1998, ISBN 3-598-22761-2, S. 390
- "Coschell, Moritz". In: Hans Vollmer (Ed.): Allgemeines Lexikon der bildenden Künstler des XX. Jahrhunderts. Vol.1: A–D. E. A. Seemann, Leipzig 1953, pg.478
- Rudolf Schmidt, Österreichisches Künstlerlexikon von den Anfängen bis zur Gegenwart, Vol.1, 1980 Tusch ISBN 978-3-85063-029-0
- Benezit Dictionnaire des Peintres, Sculpteurs, Dessinateurs, et Graveurs, Vol. 3, pg.927, Oxford University Press 1999 ISBN 978-0-19-977379-4 (Online, subscription required)
- Theodor Demmler, "Coschell, Moritz", In: Allgemeines Lexikon der Bildenden Künstler von der Antike bis zur Gegenwart, Vol. 7: Cioffi–Cousyns, E. A. Seemann, Leipzig 1912 (Online)
- Stephan Heinrich Nolte: Moritz Coschell – ein vergessener Maler Hentrich & Hentrich, Leipzig 2023, ISBN 978-3-95565-596-9
