= Franz Rumpler =

Austrian painter

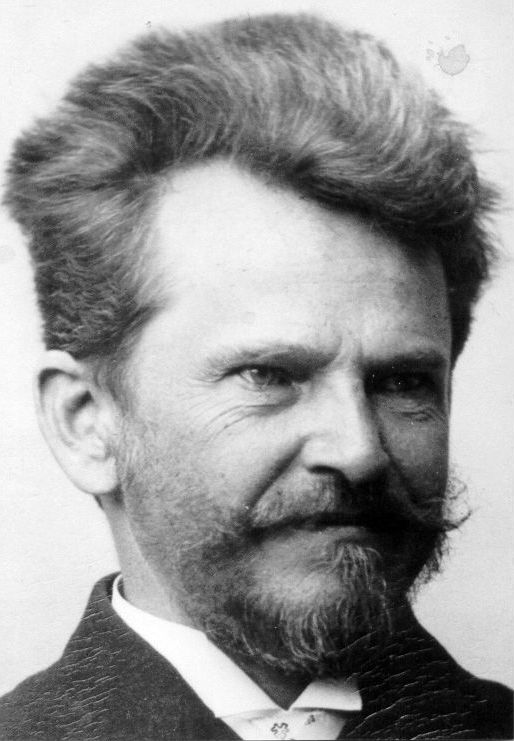
Franz Rumpler (date unknown)

Franz Rumpler (4 December 1848, Tachau - 7 March 1922, Klosterneuburg) was an Austrian genre and landscape painter.

== Biography ==
He was the son of Johann Baptist Rumpler (1807–1876), a wood carver, and brother of Johann Rumpler, the Younger (1845–1918), a wood sculptor. His first lessons came from his father. After displaying unusual talent, he was sent to Vienna for further study, at the age of fifteen, and received several prizes for his work.

He attracted the attention of the Catholic Cardinal, Prince Friedrich of Schwarzenberg and, with his financial support, was able to study at the Academy of Fine Arts with Eduard von Engerth. From 1871 to 1875, he made several study trips to Italy. During this time, he also took lessons from Hans Makart. He made another study trip to France in 1879.

During the 1890s, he served as a Professor of history painting at the Academy. His students included Moritz Coschell, Josef Floch, Wilhelm Victor Krausz, Koloman Moser and Josef Stoitzner. In 1897, he held his largest exhibition, with over 230 works, and was named an honorary citizen in his hometown of Tachau.

In 1904, he settled in Klosterneuburg, where he came under the influence of the Barbizon school and founded the "Klosterneuburger Künstlerbundes" (Artists' association). He also promoted the careers of promising young artists, such as Egon Schiele. Later, he became a member of the "Society for the Promotion of German Science, Arts and Literature in Bohemia" and was named a Hofrat; a position he held until the title was abolished in 1919. He was awarded the Order of the Iron Crown, Third Class, in 1908.

He died in 1922 and was interred at the Wiener Zentralfriedhof.

== Legacy ==
In 1929, following the death of his wife, Marie, his estate was auctioned off and the proceeds donated to various charities for the blind. A street in the Viennese district of Ottakring was named after him in 1936.

== Selected paintings ==
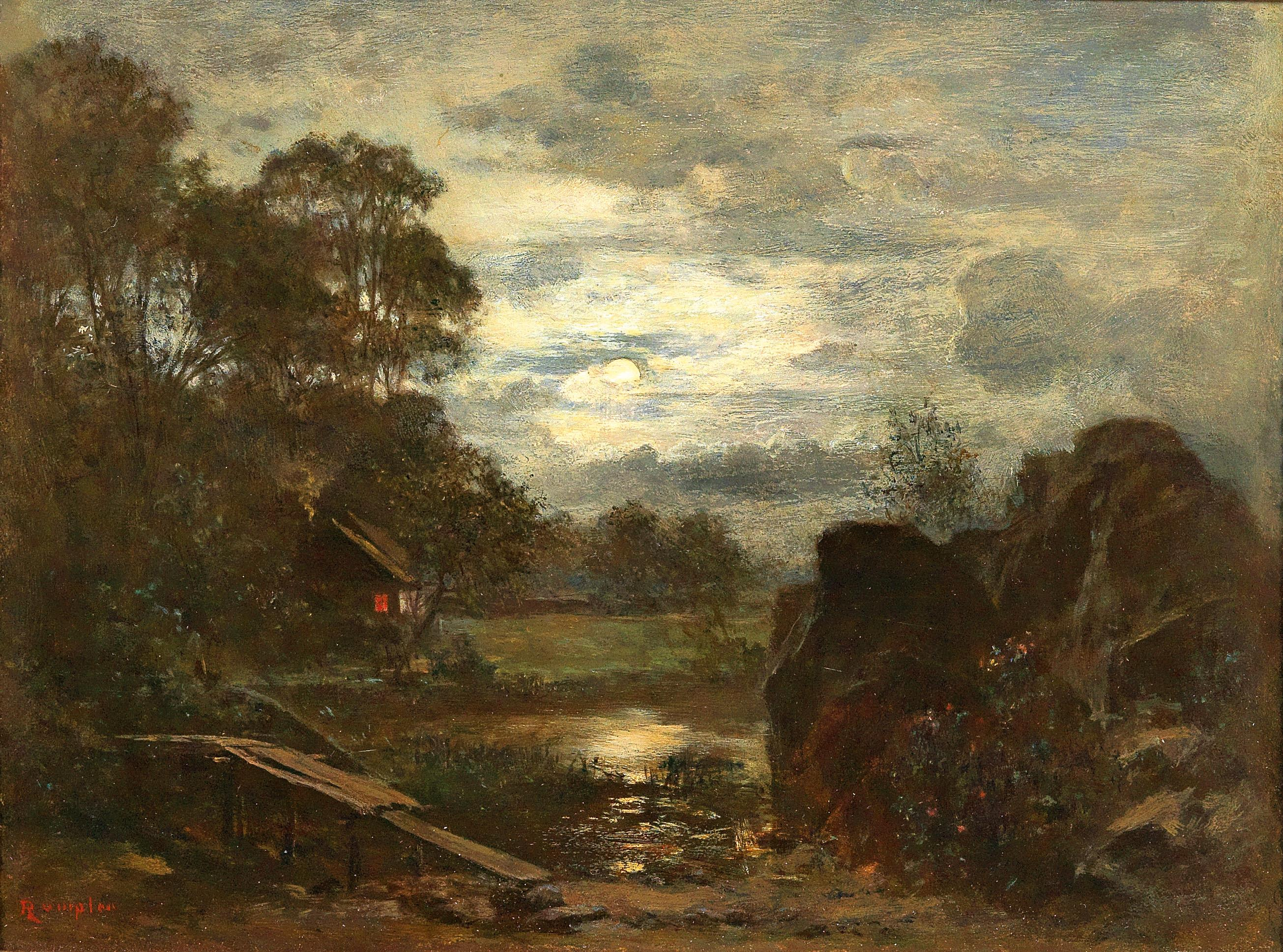
Pond Landscape in the Moonlight

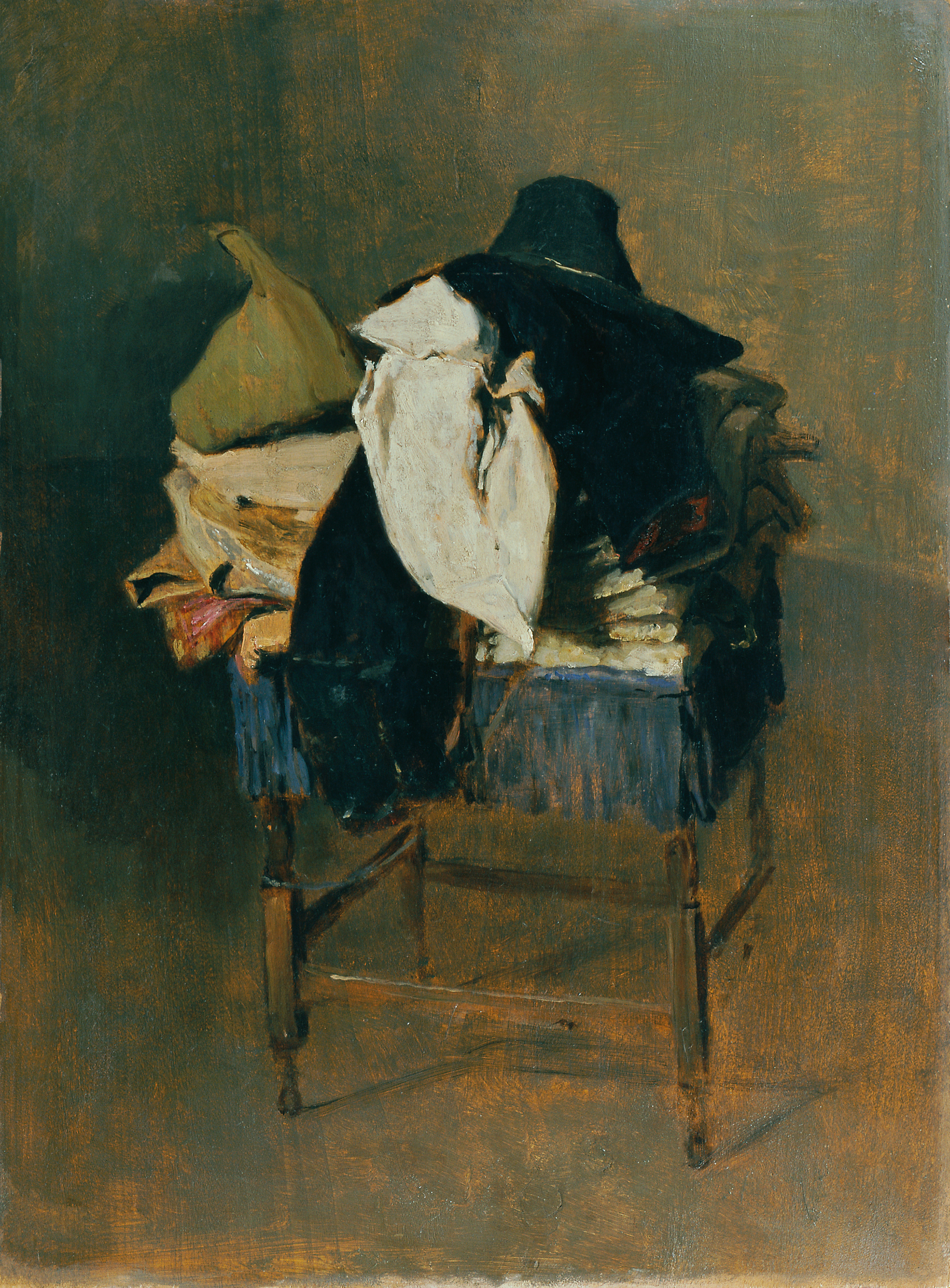
Costumes on a Chair

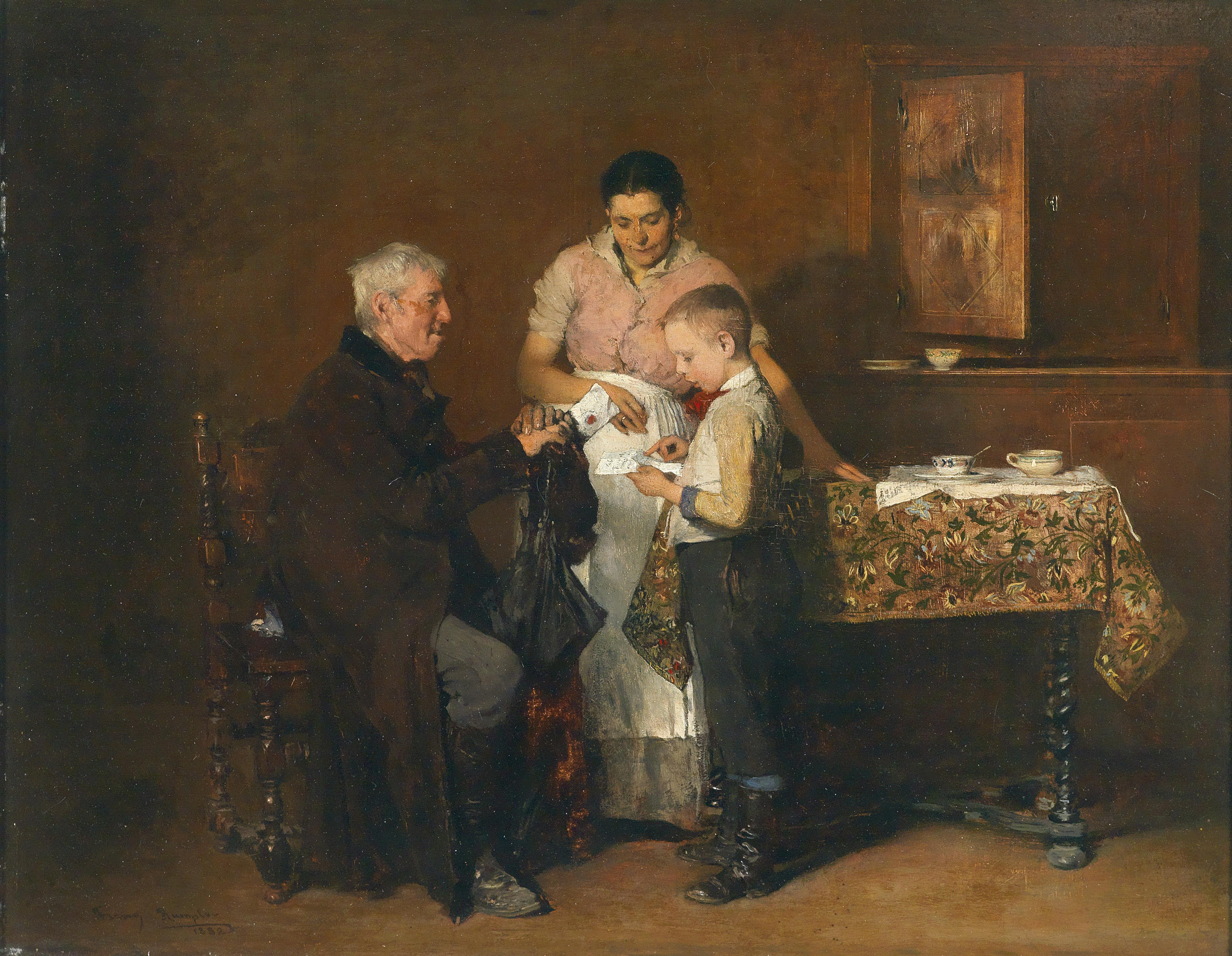
The Letter

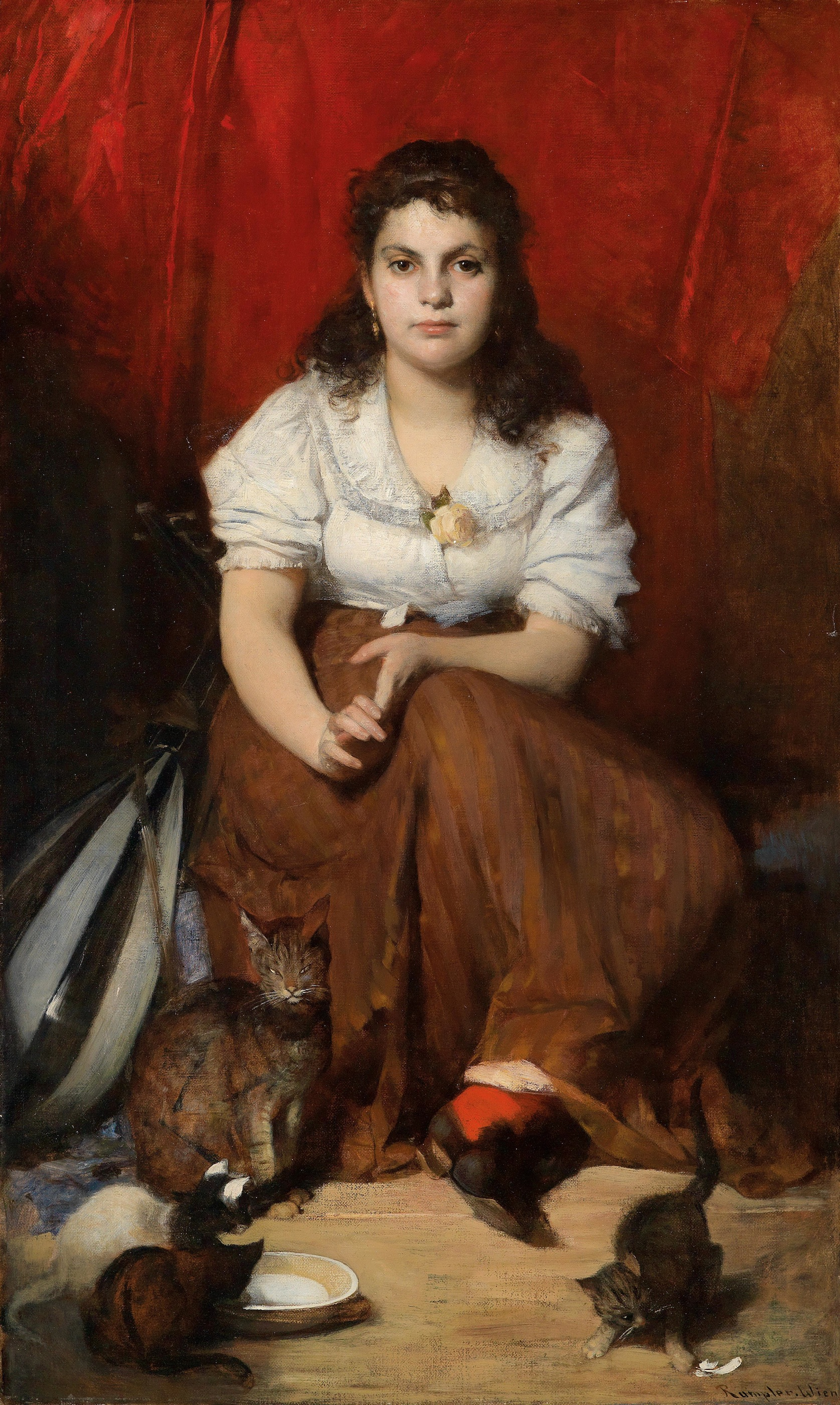
Young Woman with Cats

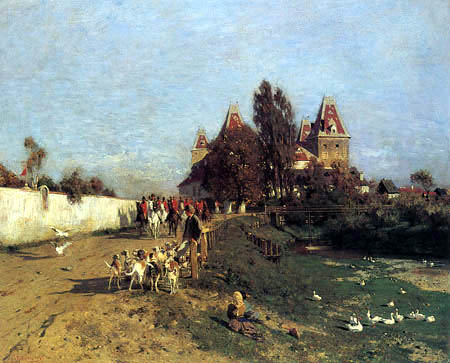
Hunt par Force at Schloss Orth
