= German Polish =

German Polish or Polish German may refer to:

- German–Polish relations
- German minority in Poland
- Polish minority in Germany
