= Albert Windisch =

German painter

Albert Windisch (17 May 1878 – 1 April 1967) was a German painter, Academy Professor and typographer. Windisch was successful as a painter and as a typographer as well. As a painter, he preferred urban scenes and portraits and after 1945 mainly floral motifs. For Klingspor he designed in 1917 the Windisch cursive font, later he worked for the Stempel foundry.

== Life ==
Albert was born in Friedberg, Hesse, as a son of the bakery owner Georg Windisch Windisch who supplied the Grand Duke of Hesse and the Tsar's family during their stays in Germany. The residential and commercial building in Usagasse 14 in Friedberg hosts a bakery until today.

Windisch first visited the Royal School of Art in Berlin, then he studied at the Academy of Arts, Berlin and from 1901 at the Academy of Fine Arts, Munich. From 1905 he taught commercial art at the School of Applied Arts in Frankfurt and was in contact with the art historian Fritz Wichert, their correspondence is preserved. With Wichert he worked on the integration of the former School of Applied Arts (Kunstgewerbeschule) into the Städelschule. After the dismissal of Willi Baumeister by the Nazis Windisch had also to teach the classes of Baumeister.

Among his students were the later known as degenerate artists defamed Kurt Scheele and Moritz Coschell, and the typographer Herbert Post. To Rudolf Koch and his circle he had a friendship and cooperation.

Windisch was from 1913 member of the Deutscher Werkbund and a member of Weimar society of bibliophiles. From 1921 he belonged to the German Confederation of commercial artist (local group Offenbach) and from 1930 he was the chairman of the Rhine-Main-group, this position he held also after 1933, and in this role his name is written in the imprint of a publication of a speech by Joseph Goebbels at the Reichskulturkammer (Chamber of Culture) on November 15, 1933.

Until the 1960s Windisch taught at the Städelschule. Windisch donated drawings by Wilhelm Conrad in 1958 to the Frankfurt Art Association. About his life's work, the Frankfurter Rundschau in 1958 wrote an extensive review on his 80th Birthday, the Frankfurter Allgemeine Zeitung on his 85th Birthday. He died in Frankfurt, aged 88.
