= Louis Jacoby =

German Jewish engraver

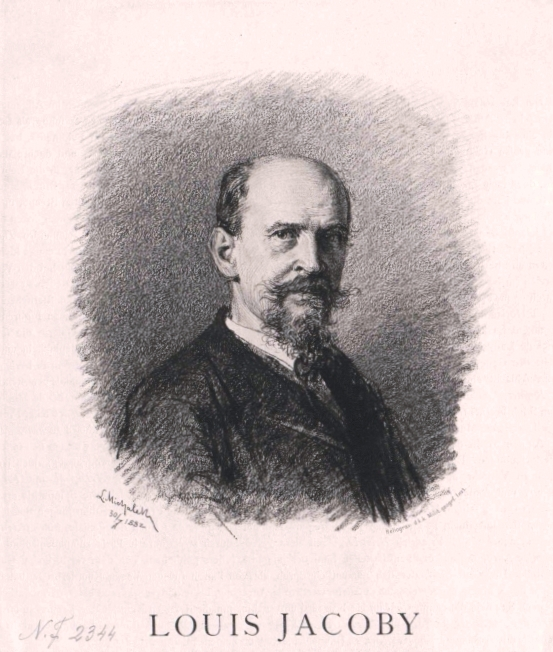
Louis Jacoby

Louis Jacoby (7 June 1828 – 1918) was a German Jewish engraver. Born in Havelberg, Brandenburg, Germany; pupil of the engraver Mandel of Berlin, in which city he settled.

== Life ==
The year 1855 he spent in Paris; 1856 in Spain; and the years 1860–63 in Italy, especially in Rome. In 1863 he was appointed professor of engraving at the Vienna Academy, and in 1882 was called to Berlin as adviser on art to the imperial printing-office.

== Works ==
Jacoby's first engraving, Tiarini's "St. John," appeared in 1850. His most important engravings are: Kaulbach's "Historical Allegory" and "The Battle of the Huns"; Raphael's "School of Athens" (of which he had made a copy during his stay at Rome); Soddoma's " The Wedding of Alexander and Roxana"; Winterhalter's "The Austrian Emperor Francis Joseph and the Empress Elizabeth"; as well as the portraits of many important scientists and members of society in the Austrian and German capitals, such as Karl Freiherr von Rokitansky, Peter von Cornelius, Ernst Guhl, Theodor Mommsen, Wilhelm Henzen, Franz Grillparzer, Heinrich August de la Motte Fouqué, and York von Wartenburg.

== Jewish Encyclopedia bibliography ==
- Meyers Konversations-Lexikon.
