= Franz Thiele =

Czech painter and university professor

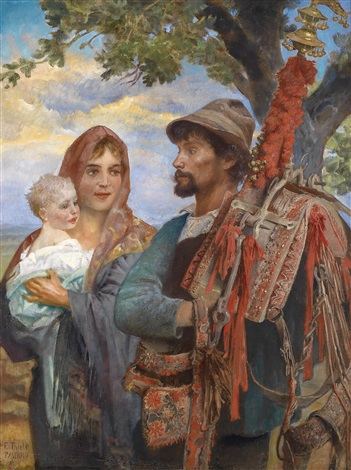
South Italian Family

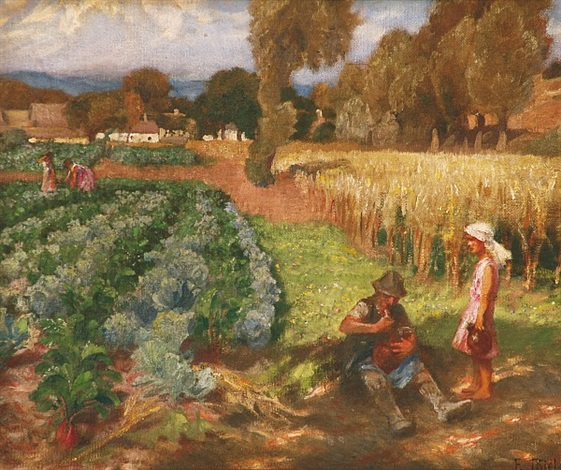
Summer Day

Franz Josef Thiele, or František Thiele (9 March 1868, Frýdlant - 23 May 1945, Prague) was a Czech painter and university professor.

== Life and work ==
His father, also named Franz, was a weaver. After completing his primary education in 1883, he received a scholarship, sponsored by the Clam-Gallas family, and went to Vienna. Following a year of introductory courses at the School of Applied Arts, he studied at the Academy of Fine Arts with August Eisenmenger, Franz Rumpler and Christian Griepenkerl.

In 1892, he was awarded a stipend to study in Italy. In 1894, he established himself in Vienna. He made numerous trips throughout Western Europe and visited Tunisia. He became a member of the Künstlerhaus in 1896 and was one of the founding members of the Hagenbund in 1900. Two years later, he was appointed an associate professor at the Academy of Fine Arts, Prague, and became a full professor in 1905; a position he would hold until 1938. He volunteered for service in 1916 and worked as a war artist on several fronts for a year.

During this period, he received several awards, including the Knight's Cross of the Order of Franz Joseph, the Order of the Iron Crown, and the Order of Saint Anna.

He was married twice; in 1909 to Maria Starou then, in 1927, to the painter, Inge Peschka (1903-1993), with whom he had a son.

He retired in 1938, following the German occupation of Czechoslovakia. His next work was a propaganda poster, showing Hitler in front of a cheering crowd. Some of his paintings were purchased by Hitler and Joseph Goebbels. Near the end of the war, he and Inge were sent to a detention center operated by Czech patriots. He did not survive. Some sources indicate he may have been lynched. He was buried in a mass grave near Prague.
