= Back Street =

Back Street or Backstreet may refer to:

== Places ==
- Back Street, Suffolk, a village in Suffolk, England

== Books ==
- Back Street (novel), a 1931 romance novel written by Fannie Hurst
- Backstreets Magazine, a quarterly Bruce Springsteen fanzine

== Film and TV ==
- Back Street (1932 film), based on the novel
- Back Street (1941 film), based on the novel
- Back Street (1961 film), based on the novel - starring Susan Hayward, John Gavin
- Backstreet (Transformers), a fictional character in the Transformers universe

== Music ==
- Backstreet Boys, a pop music group
- Back Street (album) an album by jazz saxophonist Lou Donaldson
- Backstreet (album), a 1982 album by David Sanborn
- "Backstreets", a song by Bruce Springsteen from the 1977 album Born to Run
- "Backstreets", a song by Don Toliver from the 2024 album Hardstone Psycho
- "Back Street", a 1965 single by Edwin Starr
