= Back Street (1961 film) =

1961 film

- Directed by: David Miller
- Written by: William Ludwig; Eleanore Griffin
- Based on: Back Street; 1931 novel by Fannie Hurst
- Produced by: Ross Hunter
- Starring: Susan Hayward; John Gavin; Vera Miles
- Cinematography: Stanley Cortez
- Edited by: Milton Carruth
- Music by: Frank Skinner
- Production companies: Ross Hunter Productions; Carrollton Inc.
- Distributed by: Universal Pictures
- Release date: October 11, 1961
- Running time: 107 minutes
- Country: United States
- Language: English
- Box office: $3.5 million

Back Street is a 1961 American Eastmancolor drama film directed by David Miller, and produced by Ross Hunter. The screenplay was written by William Ludwig and Eleanore Griffin based on the 1931 novel of the same name by Fannie Hurst. The music score is by Frank Skinner, who also scored the 1941 version. The film stars Susan Hayward, John Gavin, and Vera Miles.

The story follows two lovers who have limited opportunities to get together because one of them is married.

Hedda Hopper claims Hunter was considering Gregory Peck and William Holden for the lead until she suggested John Gavin.

It was nominated for an Oscar for Best Costume Design, Color (Jean Louis). Unlike the previous film versions, this one gives Susan Hayward plenty of opportunity to appear in Jean Louis's spectacular gowns. This was a trademark of Ross Hunter's remakes of older "weepies"; he employed the same method in Lana Turner's versions of Imitation of Life and Madame X.

Of all three screen versions of Back Street, this 1961 production took the most dramatic license with the novel. It is different from both the 1932 and 1941 screen versions in many ways – changing the names of several characters and updating the story to what was then the present day. Good examples of how the plotline was sensationalized in this third version are the attempted suicide and the fatal car crash.

== Plot ==
Wealthy department-store heir Paul Saxon has a romantic fling with a Nebraska dress-shop owner, Rae Smith, who breaks it off when she discovers he is married.

Rae moves to New York to become a fashion designer, then on to Rome to become the famed Dalian's partner in a salon. Paul continues to woo her, explaining that his alcoholic wife Liz won't grant him a divorce and is unstable, having tried to commit suicide.

Her resistance lowered, Rae becomes the lover of Paul, meeting secretly with him at a house near Paris that he buys. Paul's son learns of the affair and demands that Rae stop seeing his father. Liz makes a public scene humiliating Rae at a charity fashion show featuring her designs, purchasing the closing creation, a wedding gown, for $10,000.

As a drunken Liz leaves the house to attend a party, Paul confronts her. He gets into the car with her, and as the two argue they fight over the keys in the ignition. The car crashes instantly killing Liz and leaving Paul critically paralyzed in the hospital. Paul dies from his injuries, but not before insisting his son call Rae so he can tell her he loves her. Rae, Paul Jr. and his sister Caroline are left alone with their grief.

The last scene shows her sitting by the window of the home he bought for her. She was looking at his picture and a knock came on the door. It was Paul's son with his little sister and the movie ended with Rae with her arms around them.

== Cast ==
- Susan Hayward as Rae Smith
- John Gavin as Paul Saxon
- Vera Miles as Liz Saxon
- Charles Drake as Curt Stanton
- Virginia Grey as Janie
- Reginald Gardiner as Dalian
- Tammy Marihugh as Caroline
- Robert Eyer as Paul Saxon Jr.
- Natalie Schafer as Mrs. Evans
- Doreen McLean as Miss Hatfield
- Alex Gerry as Mr. Venner
- Karen Norris as Mrs. Penworth
- Hayden Rorke as Charley Claypole
- Mary Lawrence as Marge Claypole

== Production ==
Filming started 21 September 1960.

== Reception ==
=== Critical response ===
In The New York Times, film critic Bosley Crowther wrote: "Producer Ross Hunter has crammed so much swank and so much plush Parisian elegance that we wonder he didn't change the title to something like 'Rue du Bac.' Never has Miss Hurst's little lady (represented heretofore by Irene Dunne and Margaret Sullavan, vis-à-vis the respective consorts of John Boles and Charles Boyer) been set up in such elaborate diggings or lavished with such expensive gifts as is Susan Hayward by John Gavin in this elaborate and expensive color film."

Variety said it was "strictly for the women".

=== Release ===
Back Street released on DVD on May 29, 2014.

== See also ==
- List of American films of 1961
