= Forbidden (1932 film) =

1932 film

- Theatrical release poster
- Directed by: Frank Capra
- Screenplay by: Jo Swerling
- Story by: Frank Capra
- Produced by: Frank Capra; Harry Cohn
- Starring: Barbara Stanwyck; Adolphe Menjou; Ralph Bellamy
- Cinematography: Joseph Walker
- Edited by: Maurice Wright
- Production company: Columbia Pictures
- Distributed by: Columbia Pictures
- Release date: January 15, 1932 (USA)
- Running time: 83 minutes
- Country: United States
- Language: English

Forbidden is a 1932 American pre-Code melodrama film directed by Frank Capra and starring Barbara Stanwyck, Adolphe Menjou, and Ralph Bellamy. An original story inspired by the 1931 novel Back Street by Fannie Hurst, with a screenplay by Jo Swerling, the film is about a young librarian who falls in love with a married man while on a sea cruise. The film's copyright was registered in 1932 and renewed in 1959. It will enter the American public domain on January 1, 2028. (Note: Under R230985)

== Plot ==
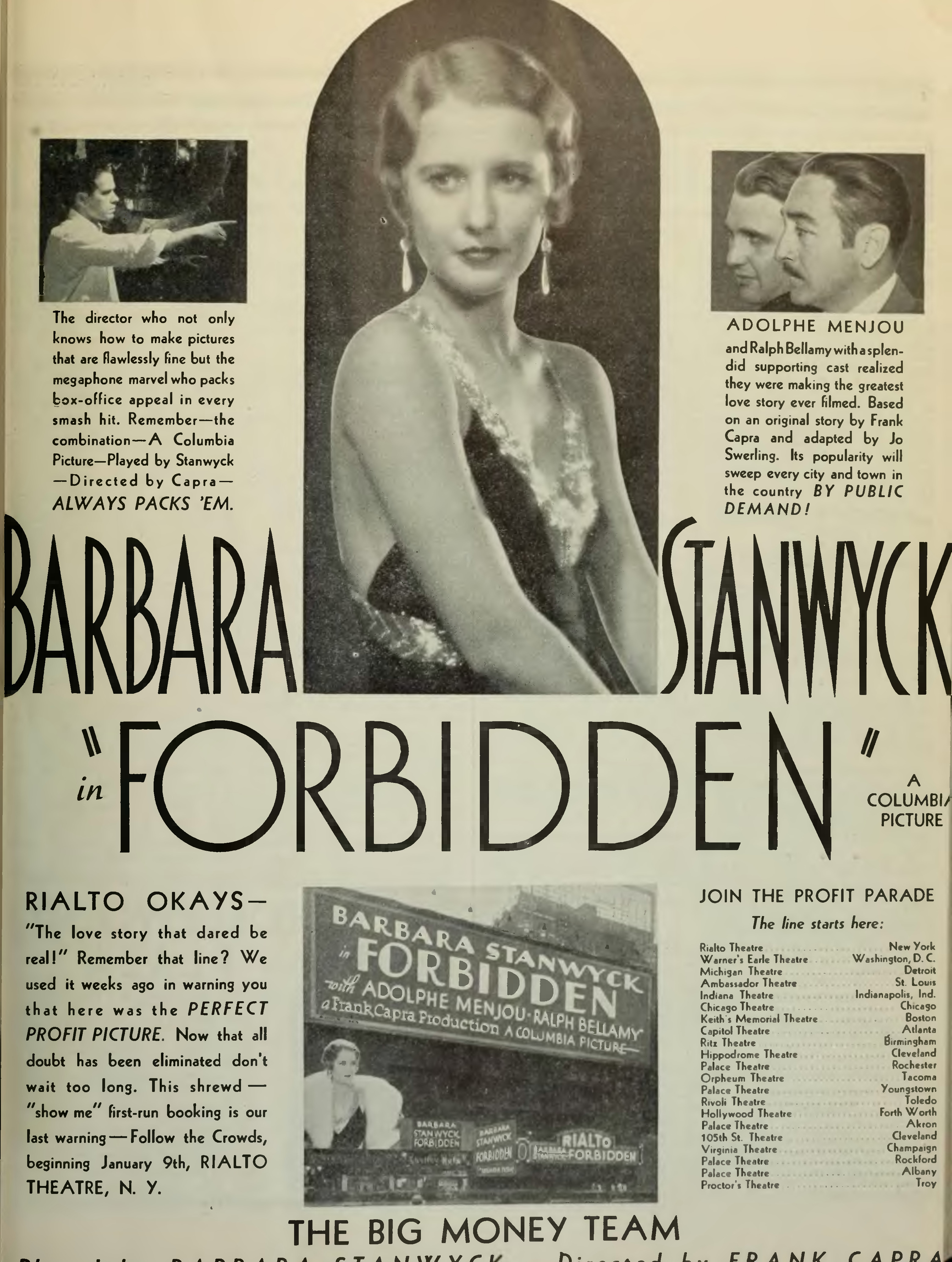
The Film Daily ad

Librarian Lulu Smith, late to work for the first time in eight years, the victim of spring fever, and frustrated by her loneliness, withdraws her life savings for a two-week romantic cruise to Havana, advertised as the "land of romance". Aboard ship, Bob Grover, a lawyer with political ambitions, mistakes her room 66 for his room 99. They soon develop a romantic attraction, and spend time gambling, drinking, riding horses, and taking moonlit beach walks. Asked why she came to Havana, she answers, "To meet you".

Upon returning, Lulu follows Bob to the city, taking a job as a clerical assistant for the Daily Record newspaper, where brash reporter Al Holland pursues her. Al's marriage proposal to Lulu prompts Bob to confess that he cannot abandon his invalid wife Helen, and their relationship must end. Lulu begs him to continue their affair, but Bob refuses to let her waste her life on him. Furious, Lulu throws Bob out without revealing that she is pregnant with his child. A few months later, Lulu gives birth to a baby girl.

Two years later, Bob has become district attorney and Al is now city editor. Because Al's newspaper helped elect Bob, he feels that Bob now owes him a few favors. When Bob refuses, Al vows to ruin him. A detective finds Lulu and Bob is introduced to his daughter Roberta. Spotting them together, Al asks about Roberta. To protect Bob's reputation, Lulu lies that Roberta is Bob's adopted daughter, and she is her governess. Bob adopts Roberta and presents her to Helen, recently returned from a health cure in Vienna. Helen is delighted with Roberta but questions Lulu's ability to care for her, telling Bob that she wishes to choose a different governess. Lulu runs out, and when Bob catches up with her, she ends their relationship for good. She leaves him and Roberta because she cannot bear living in his household while watching Helen be her mother and his wife.

Turning to Al for a job, Lulu becomes the "advice to the lovelorn" columnist for his newspaper. Al tries to get information from Lulu about Bob and Roberta in order to undermine Bob's political career, but she refuses to say anything. Years pass, and Lulu follows Bob's career as he becomes mayor, congressman, and eventually governor. She also follows her daughter becoming a beautiful debutante. Lulu is still working at the newspaper for Al, who has become managing editor. He continues to pursue her, but she remains in love with Bob.

On the night Bob is nominated for governor, he comes to Lulu's apartment, disheartened and ashamed of the hypocrisy of his secret life. He is finally ready to leave his wife and run away with Lulu. When he threatens to confess the truth to the public, Lulu talks him out of ruining his career and reputation. The next day, Lulu asks Al to marry her, knowing that Bob will not reveal the truth now that she is married.

On the night of Bob's election, Al reveals to Lulu that he knows all about her, Bob, and Roberta. He reads her a recent letter that he'd intercepted from Bob, who had written to Lulu of their relationship and their daughter. When she tries to retrieve it, Al hits her across the face, knocking her across the room. Faced with the threat of Bob's destruction, Lulu shoots Al dead to prevent him from publishing the story. As she stands holding the gun, the radio announces Grover's victory as governor.

Under a year later, Lulu receives a pardon from Bob after serving a short jail term. She visits Bob who is on his deathbed, and he shows her his new will, which reveals everything about their relationship and leaves her half of his estate. After he dies, however, Lulu tears up the will and throws it away, in order to protect Bob's memory and their daughter Roberta, who is engaged to be married.

== Cast ==
- Barbara Stanwyck as Lulu Smith
- Adolphe Menjou as Bob Grover
- Ralph Bellamy as Al Holland
- Dorothy Peterson as Helen
- Thomas Jefferson as Wilkinson
- Myrna Fresholt as Roberta (Baby)
- Charlotte Henry as Roberta (18)
- Oliver Eckhardt as Briggs

== See also ==
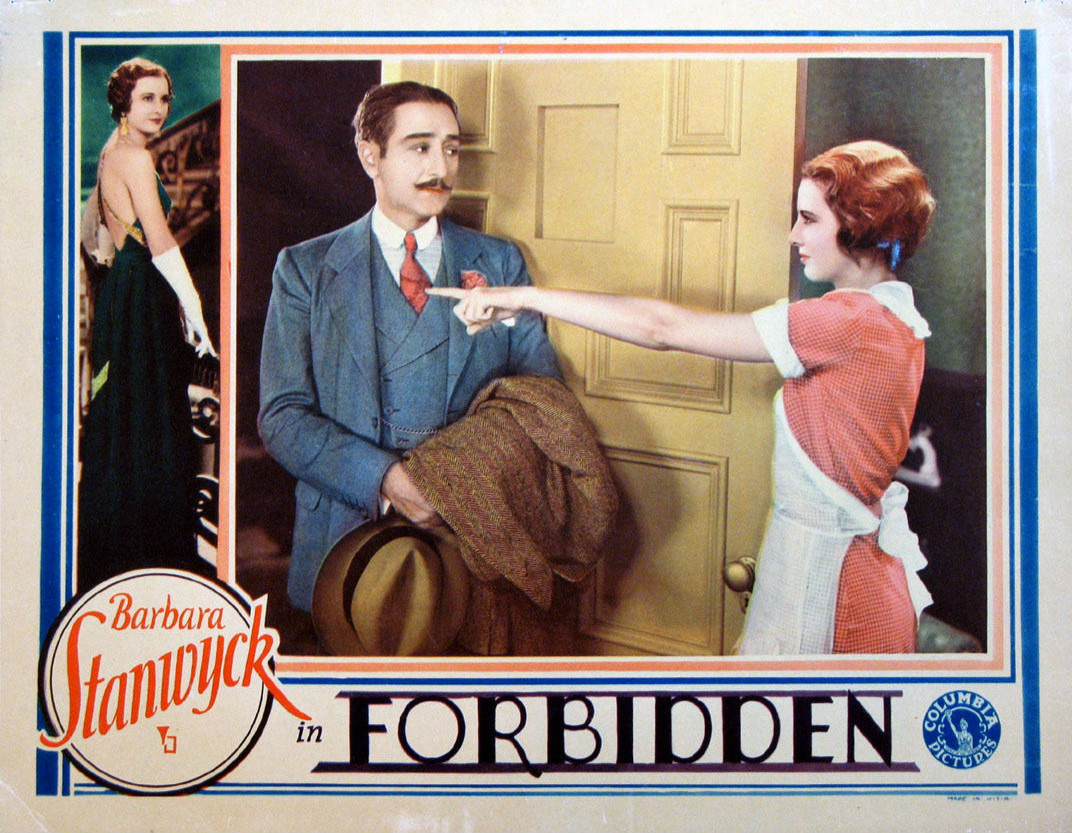
Lobby card

- List of American films of 1932
