= Theodore Soderberg (1890–1971) =

American sound engineer

- Born: January 31, 1890; Somerset, Wisconsin, United States
- Died: December 19, 1971 (aged 81); Glendale, California, United States
- Occupation: Sound engineer

Theodore Soderberg (January 31, 1890 – December 19, 1971) was an American sound engineer. He was nominated for an Academy Award in the category Sound Recording for the film Imitation of Life.

== Selected filmography ==
- Imitation of Life (1934)
