= Fannie Hurst =

American novelist

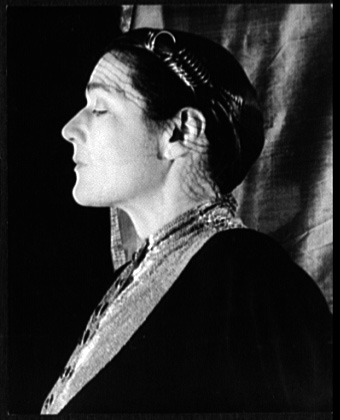
- Fannie Hurst in 1932. Photograph by Carl Van Vechten.
- Born: October 18, 1889; Hamilton, Ohio
- Died: February 23, 1968 (aged 78); Manhattan, New York City
- Occupations: Novelist, writer
- Spouse: Jacques S. Danielson (1915-1952; his death)
- Writing career
- Notable works: Back Street, Imitation of Life

Fannie Hurst (October 18, 1889 – February 23, 1968) was an American novelist and short-story writer whose works were highly popular during the post-World War I era. Her work combined sentimental, romantic themes with social issues of the day, such as women's rights and race relations. She was one of the most widely read female authors of the 20th century, and for a time in the 1920s she was one of the highest-paid American writers. Hurst actively supported a number of social causes, including feminism, African American equality, and New Deal programs.

Although her novels, including Lummox (1923), Back Street (1931), and Imitation of Life (1933), lost popularity over time and were mostly out of print as of the 2000s, they were bestsellers when first published and were translated into many languages. She also published over 300 short stories during her lifetime.

Hurst is known for the film adaptations of her works, including Imitation of Life (1934), Four Daughters (1938), Imitation of Life (1959), Humoresque (1946), and Young at Heart (1954, a musical remake of Four Daughters).

== Early life ==
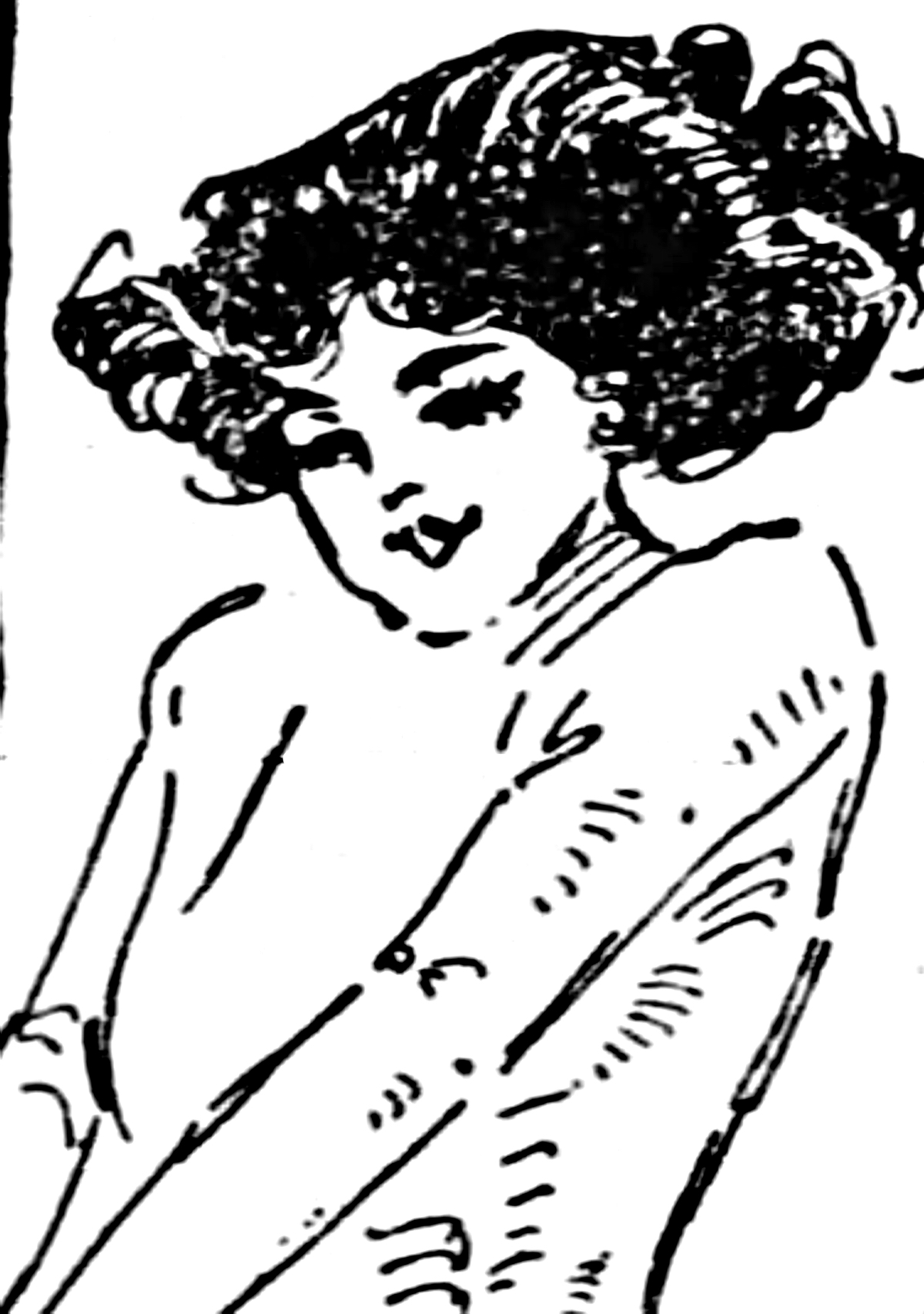
Sketch by Marguerite Martyn of Hurst in her last year at Washington University, 1909

Hurst was born on October 19, 1885, in Hamilton, Ohio, to shoe-factory owner Samuel Hurst and his wife Rose (née Koppel), who were assimilated Jewish immigrants from Bavaria. A younger sister died of diphtheria at age four, leaving Hurst as her parents' only surviving child. She grew up at 5641 Cates Avenue in St. Louis, Missouri and was a student at Central High School.

She attended Washington University and graduated in 1909 at age 24. In her autobiography, she portrayed her family as comfortably middle-class, except for a two-year stint in a boarding house necessitated by a sudden financial downturn. This period sparked her initial interest in the plight of the poor.

But later researchers, including her biographer Brooke Kroeger and literary historian Susan Koppelman, have challenged this account of Hurst's childhood. According to Koppelman, while Fannie Hurst was growing up, her father changed businesses four times, never achieved much financial success, and failed in business at least once. The Hurst family lived at 11 different boarding houses before Fannie turned 16. Kroeger wrote that while Samuel and Rose Hurst did eventually move to a house in a fashionable section of St. Louis, this did not occur until Fannie Hurst's third year of college, rather than during her childhood.

In her last term in college, Hurst wrote the book and lyrics for a comic opera, The Official Chaperon, which was performed on the Washington University campus in June 1909.

After her college graduation, Hurst briefly worked in a shoe factory before moving to New York City in 1911 to pursue a writing career. Although she had published one story while in college, she received more than 35 rejections before she was able to sell a second story and begin to establish herself as a regularly published author.

During her early years in New York, she worked a variety of jobs: as a waitress at Childs and a sales clerk at Macy's, and acted in bit parts on Broadway. As Hurst worked these jobs, under the name Rose Samuels, she observed her customers as well as employees. She began to take note of important social issues such as unequal pay and gender inequality.

In her spare time, Hurst attended night court sessions and visited Ellis Island and the slums, becoming in her own words "passionately anxious to awake in others a general sensitiveness to small people", and developing an awareness of "causes, including the lost and the threatened".

== Career ==
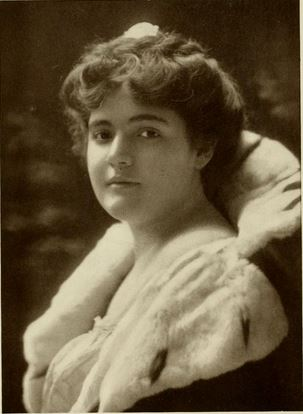
Fannie Hurst, 1914

In the years after World War I, Hurst became famous as an author of extremely popular short stories and novels, many of which were made into films. Her popularity continued for several decades, only beginning to decline after World War II.

Throughout her life, Hurst also actively worked and spoke on behalf of social justice organizations and causes supporting feminism and African-American civil rights, and occasionally supported other oppressed groups such as Jewish refugees (although she chose not to support some other Jewish causes), homosexuals, and prisoners.

She was also appointed to several committees associated with President Franklin D. Roosevelt's New Deal programs.

=== Author ===
In 1912, after numerous rejections, Hurst finally published a story in The Saturday Evening Post, which shortly thereafter requested exclusive release of her future writings. She went on to publish many more stories, mostly in the Post and in Cosmopolitan magazine, eventually earning as much as $5,000 per story. Her first collection of short stories, Just Around the Corner, was published in 1914, and her first novel, Star-Dust: The Story of an American Girl, appeared in 1921.

By 1925, she had published five collections of short stories and two novels, and become one of the most highly paid authors in the United States. It was said of Hurst that "no other living American woman has gone so far in fiction in so short a time."

Her works were designed to appeal primarily to a female audience, and usually had working-class or middle-class female protagonists concerned with romantic relationships and economic need (see Major themes). Hurst was strongly influenced by the works of Edgar Lee Masters, particularly Spoon River Anthology (1916). She also had read and learned from the works of Charles Dickens, Upton Sinclair, and Thomas Hardy. Hurst considered herself to be a serious writer, and publicly disparaged the works of other popular authors such as Gene Stratton-Porter and Harold Bell Wright, dismissing Wright as a "sentimental" author whose works people read only for "relaxation".

Early in Hurst's career, critics also considered her to be a serious artist, admiring her sensitive portrayals of immigrant life and urban "working girls". Her stories and books regularly made annual "best-of" lists, and she was called a female O. Henry. Her second novel, Lummox (1923), about the tribulations of an oppressed domestic servant, was praised for its insights by Vladimir Lenin, Leon Trotsky, and Eleanor Roosevelt. However, some reviewers criticized her for "sappy" plots and careless writing. F. Scott Fitzgerald, in his 1920 novel This Side of Paradise, had a character presciently describe Hurst as one of several authors "not producing among 'em one story or novel that will last 10 years."

By the late 1930s, critics no longer took her seriously and sometimes expressed frustration about the continued commercial popularity of her work in the face of bad reviews. In the post-World War II era, she was regarded as a popular author who wrote for and about the working classes. She became a favorite target of parodists, including Langston Hughes, who parodied her racially themed novel Imitation of Life as Limitations of Life. Her own editor, Kenneth McCormick, described her as a "fairly corny artist" but a "wonderful storyteller". She was also called the "Queen of the Sob Sisters". Hurst recognized that she was "not a darling of the critics" but said, "I have a vast popular audience — it warms me, like a furnace."

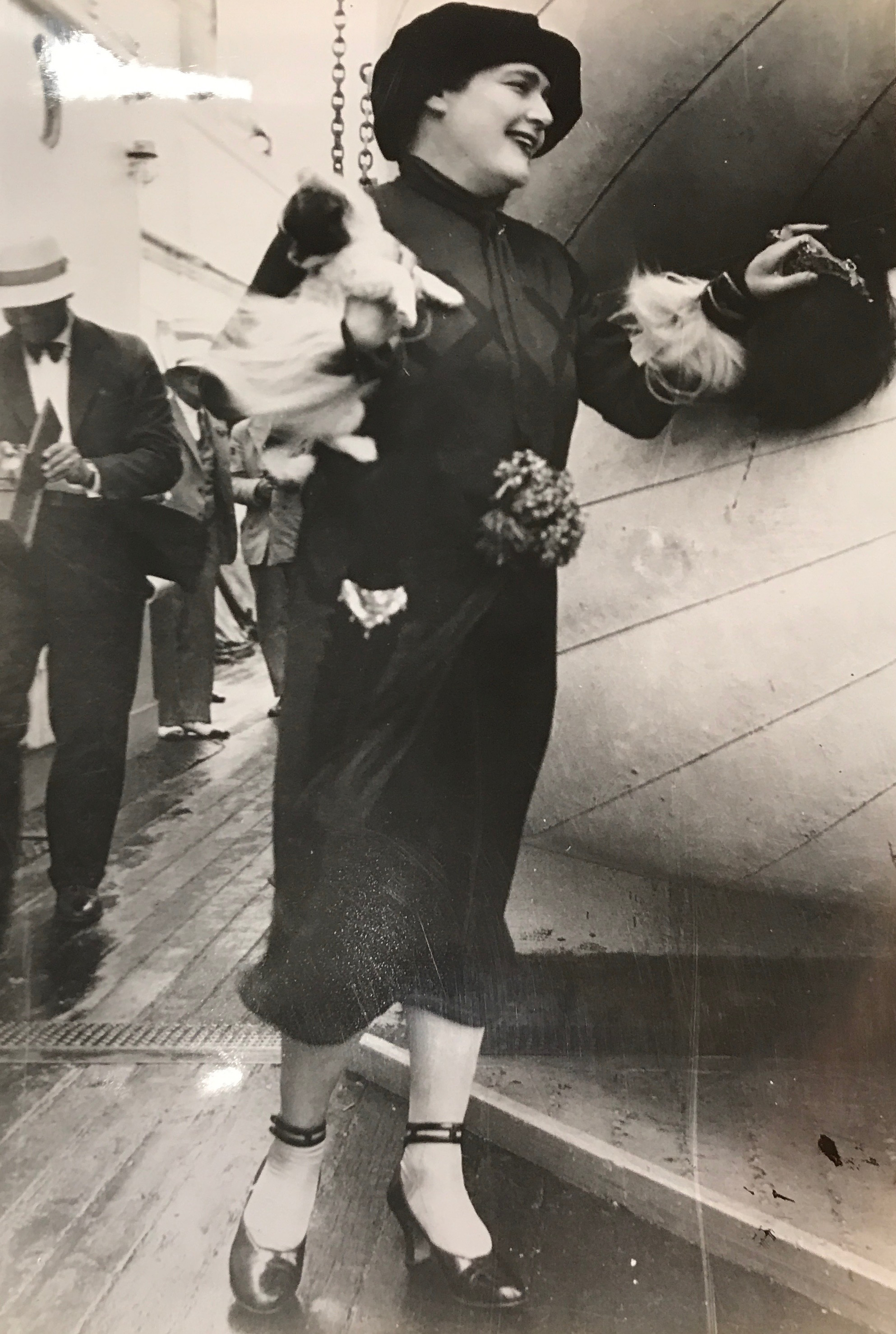
Hurst boarding the SS Leviathan with a dog in 1925 in New York

The great popularity of Hurst's works gave her major celebrity status. Hurst also took steps to publicize herself for purposes of promoting both her writing and the activist causes she espoused (see Social activism). In the 1920s, news media widely covered aspects of her personal life such as her unconventional marriage (see Life and death) and a diet on which she lost 40 pounds. She was frequently interviewed about her views on subjects relating to love, marriage and family. For decades, The New York Times continued to report regularly on Hurst's doings, including her walks in Central Park with her dogs, her travels abroad, her wardrobe, and the interior decoration of her apartment.

Back Street (1931), Hurst's seventh novel, was hailed as her "magnum opus" and has been called her "best loved" work. Its main character, a confident, independent young gentile woman, falls in love with a married Jewish banker and becomes his secret mistress, sacrificing her own life in the process and ultimately meeting a tragic end.

Hurst's next novel, Imitation of Life (1933), was also hugely popular. It is now considered her best known novel. It told the story of two single mothers, one white and one African American, who become partners in a successful waffle and restaurant business (modeled after Quaker Oats Company's "Aunt Jemima" pancake mix) and have conflicts with their teenage daughters. Hurst's inspiration for the book was her own friendship with African-American author Zora Neale Hurston. However, Imitation of Life and the two films based on it provoked controversy due to their treatment of the African-American characters. These include a romanticized mammy figure and a "tragic mulatto" young woman who rejects her loving mother in order to pass for white.

Approximately 30 films were made from Hurst's fiction. Back Street was the basis for three films of the same name in 1932, 1941 and 1961. Frank Capra 's Forbidden (1932) liberally borrowed elements from Hurst's novel without crediting her.

Imitation of Life was twice adapted for film in 1934 and 1959. Both films were respectively inductees for the 2005 and 2015 National Film Registry lists.

It was also adapted by Joselito Rodriguez for the 1949 Mexican film Angelitos negros ("Little Black Angels"). This was adapted again and released in 1970 in two versions: as a feature film and as a telenovela.

Her short story "Humoresque", published in 1919, was adapted as a 1920 silent film and as a 1946 film noir starring Joan Crawford. A later story, "Sister Act", published in Cosmopolitan in 1937, inspired the musical films Four Daughters (1938) and the Frank Sinatra vehicle Young at Heart (1954).

Hurst continued to write and publish until her death in 1968, although the commercial value of her work declined after World War II as popular tastes changed. Her total publications over her nearly six-decade career include 19 novels, more than 300 short stories (63 of which were gathered in eight short-story collections), four plays produced on Broadway, a full-length autobiography and an autobiographical memoir, numerous magazine articles, personal essays, articles (often unsigned) for various organizations to which she belonged, and screenplays (both independently written and collaborations) for several films.

=== Social activism ===
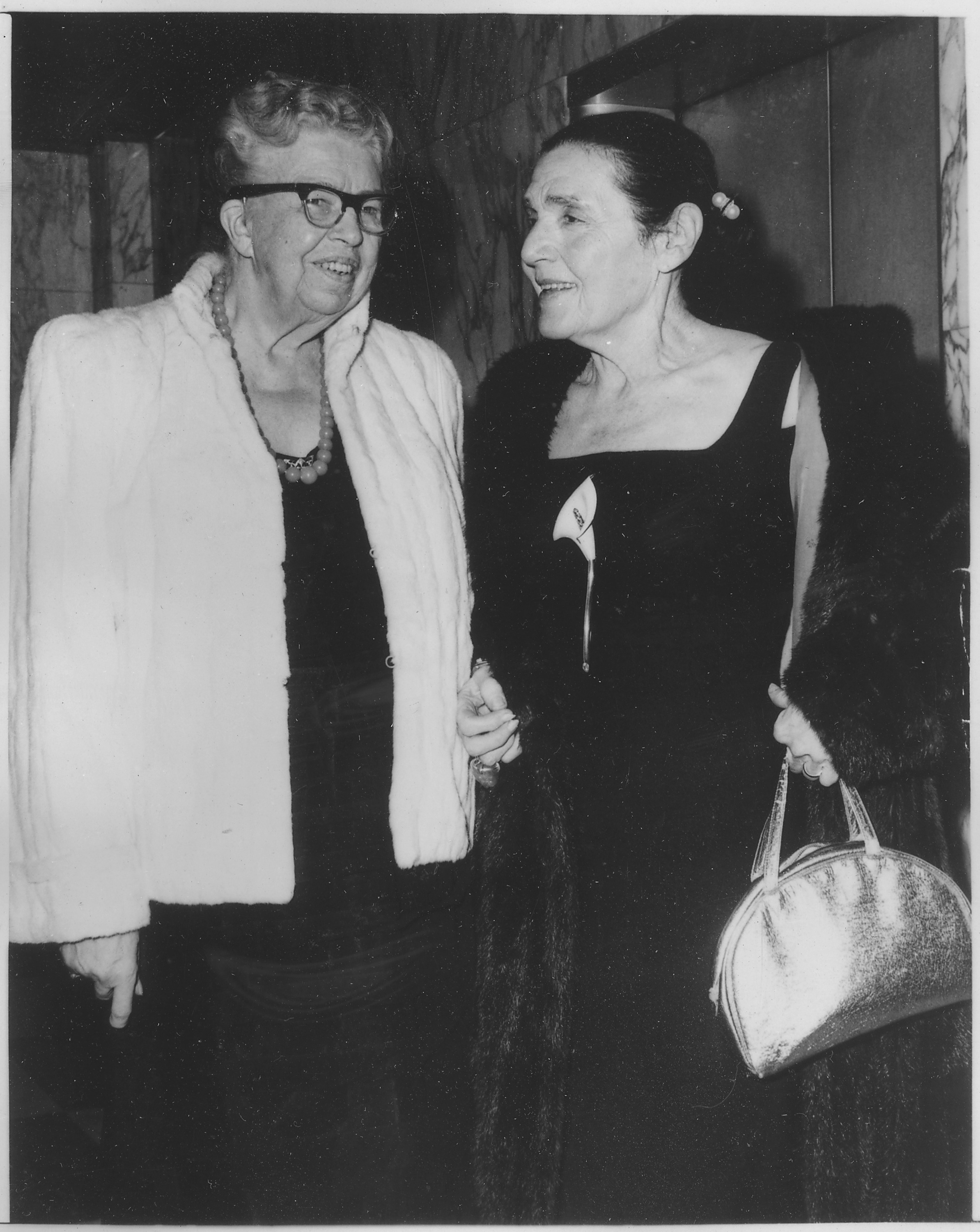
Eleanor Roosevelt (left) with Hurst in 1962

Throughout her life, Hurst was involved with many social activist groups supporting equal rights for women and African Americans, and occasionally assisting other people in need. In 1921, Hurst was among the first to join the Lucy Stone League, an organization that fought for women to preserve their maiden names. She was a member of the feminist intellectual group Heterodoxy in Greenwich Village, and was active in the Urban League. She volunteered as a regular visitor to inmates of a women's prison in Manhattan. During World War II she raised money to help Jewish refugees fleeing Europe, but in her earlier years was less supportive of other Jewish causes, saying in a 1925 interview that Zionism "segregates us, raises barriers or creates race prejudice". Her attitude changed in the 1950s, and in 1963 she received an honorary award from the Zionist women's organization Hadassah.

During the 1930s and 1940s, Hurst was a friend of Eleanor Roosevelt and a frequent White House visitor. Hurst was named chair of the National Housing Commission in 1936–1937 and appointed to the National Advisory Committee to the Works Progress Administration in 1940. She was a delegate to the World Health Organization in 1952.

In 1958, Hurst briefly hosted a television talk show out of New York called Showcase. Showcase was notable for presenting several of the earliest well-rounded discussions of homosexuality and was one of the few programs on which homosexual men spoke for themselves rather than being debated by a panel of "experts". Hurst was praised by early homophile group the Mattachine Society, which invited Hurst to deliver the keynote address at the Society's 1958 convention.

== Life and death ==
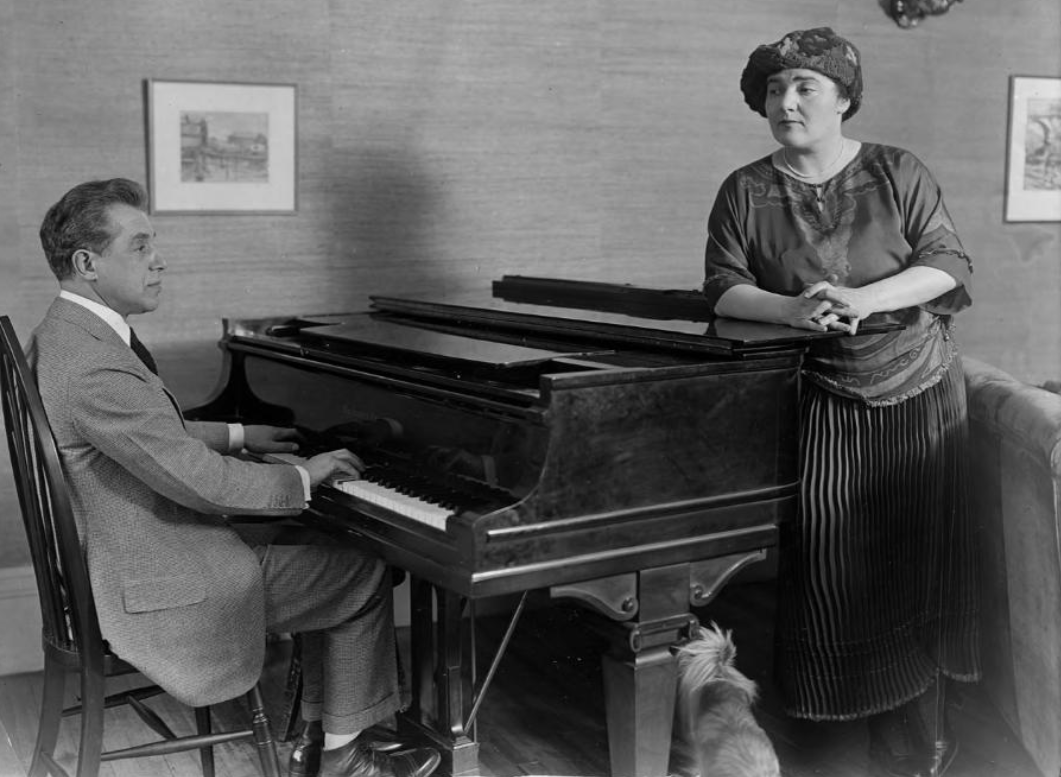
Danielson and Hurst in 1920

In 1915, Hurst secretly married Jacques S. Danielson, a Russian émigré pianist. Hurst kept her maiden name and the couple maintained separate residences and arranged to renew their marriage contract every five years, if they both agreed to do so. The revelation of the marriage in 1920 made national headlines, and The New York Times criticized the couple in an editorial for occupying two residences during a housing shortage. Hurst responded by saying that a married woman had the right to retain her own name, her own special life, and her personal liberty. Hurst and Danielson had no children, and remained married until Danielson's death in 1952. After his death, Hurst continued to write weekly letters to him for the next 16 years until she died, and regularly wore a calla lily, the first flower he had ever sent her.

During the 1920s and 1930s, while she was married to Danielson, Hurst also had a long affair with Arctic explorer Vilhjalmur Stefansson. They often met at Romany Marie's café in Greenwich Village when Stefansson was in town. According to Stefansson, at one point Hurst considered divorcing Danielson in order to marry him, but decided against it. Hurst and Stefansson ended their relationship in 1939.

Hurst was friends with many leading figures of the Harlem Renaissance, including Carl Van Vechten and Zora Neale Hurston, who during her time at Barnard College worked as Hurst's secretary and later traveled with her. In 1958, Hurst published her autobiography, Anatomy of Me, which described many of her friendships and encounters with famous people of the era such as Theodore Dreiser and Eleanor Roosevelt.

Overweight as a child and young woman, Hurst had a lifelong concern about her weight. She was known in literary circles as an avid dieter and published an autobiographical memoir about her dieting, No Food With My Meals, in 1935.

Hurst died on February 23, 1968, at her Hotel des Artistes apartment in Manhattan, after a brief illness. A few weeks before she died, she sent her publishers two new novels which were never published, one untitled and the other entitled Lonely is Only a Word. Her obituary appeared on the front page of The New York Times.

== Major themes ==
Combining sentimentality with social realism, Hurst's fiction focuses on American (including immigrant) working-class and middle-class women who attempt to balance societal expectations and economic needs with their own desires for fulfillment. Many Hurst characters, male and female, are working people trying to rise above their class. Abe C. Ravitz described Hurst's themes as "women's issues expressed often in myths of sacrifice, suffering, and love" and Hurst herself as "the laureate of the ghetto and the New Woman". For readers unfamiliar with city life, Hurst's experiences allowed her to create accurate depictions of contemporaneous New York City and, in her later works, the Midwest. She often dealt with subject matter considered "daringly frank and earthy" for its time, including unwed pregnancy, extramarital affairs, miscegnation, and homosexuality. Hurst's work has been criticized for relying heavily on stereotypes, including "The Cad, the Alcoholic, the Egotist, the Self-Absorbed Rich Lady, the Golden-Hearted Whore, the Brave Wife, the Pure-Minded Virgin, and the Honest Burgher".

Women in Hurst's works are generally victimized in some way by preconceived attitudes or social and economic discrimination. including sexual harassment, gender discrimination, and age discrimination. Although Hurst's women often have jobs, economic security for women is typically portrayed as coming through marriage, or sometimes through being a well-paid mistress to a wealthy man. Women whose relationships fail to meet these standards, or who pursue a type of love relationship without economic benefits, suffer deprivation or meet with tragedy. The women's situations are frequently made worse by their own passivity, a trait Hurst deplored; a happy ending often either does not occur, or occurs because of outside forces rather than the afflicted woman's own efforts. Hurst also focused on describing the "interior lives of women" and how the life choices of her female characters are driven by feelings and passions that they often cannot articulate or explain.

== Influence and legacy ==
In 1964, Hurst established her archive at the Harry Ransom Center at the University of Texas at Austin with the assistance of her friend, the noted civil rights lawyer Morris Ernst. The collection of over 270 boxes includes extensive manuscripts of her works (short stories, novels, film scenarios, plays, articles, columns, speeches, and talks), both incoming and outgoing correspondence, notebooks, wills, contracts, interviews, and biographical material.

Upon her death in 1968, Hurst left half of her estate to her alma mater Washington University in St. Louis, and the other half to Brandeis University. The universities used the money to endow professorships in their English departments and to create "Hurst Lounges" for writers to share their work with academics and students.

At the time of her death, and for several decades thereafter, Hurst was treated as a popular culture writer, credited with having "set the style followed by Jacqueline Susann, Judith Krantz, and Jackie Collins" and considered "one of the great trash novelists". Her works fell into obscurity and largely went out of print. In the 1990s, Hurst's life and work again started to receive serious critical attention, including the formation of a Fannie Hurst Society for interested scholars; a volume of literary criticism by Abe C. Ravitz published in 1997; and a detailed biography of Hurst by Kroeger published in 1999.

In 2004, The Feminist Press published a collection of her stories from the years 1912 to 1935, seeking to "propel a long overdue revival and reassessment of Hurst's work" and praising her "depth, intelligence, and artistry as a writer."

Other aspects of Hurst's life and work examined by scholars include her American Jewish background, her friendship with and patronage of Zora Neale Hurston (which Hurston discussed in her own autobiography), the treatment of racial issues in her novel Imitation of Life and the movies based upon it, and her well-publicized dieting. She has been called a pioneer in the field of public relations due to her development of her own strong public persona.

== In popular culture ==
Hurst was a strong advocate for women maintaining independence their whole lives, even after marriage. In the 1920s, after Hurst revealed her marriage to Jacques Danielson, yet retained her own name and each had their own separate homes, the term "a Fannie Hurst marriage" was coined to describe a marital arrangement similar to Hurst's, where the husband and wife each maintained their own independent lives, even to the point of living in separate residences.

Hurst has been referenced in popular culture to exemplify a popular or lowbrow author, in contrast to serious, literary authors. The theme song of the 1970 Mel Brooks comedy film The Twelve Chairs includes the lines, "Hope for the best, expect the worst/ You could be Tolstoy or Fannie Hurst." Hurst is mentioned in a similar vein in the song "You're So London" by Mike Nichols and Ken Welch, written for the show Julie and Carol at Carnegie Hall (1962): "You're so kippers, you're so caviar and I'm so liverwurst/ You're so Shakespeare, so Bernard Shaw and I'm so Fannie Hurst."

== Selected works ==
=== Short story collections ===
- Just Around the Corner (1914)
- Every Soul Hath Its Song (1916)
- Gaslight Sonatas (1918)
- Humoresque: A Laugh on Life with a Tear Behind It (1919)
- The Vertical City (1922)
- Song of Life (1927)
- Procession (1929)
- We are Ten (1937)

=== Novels ===
- Star-Dust: The Story of an American Girl (1921)
- Lummox (1923)
- Mannequin (1926)
- Appassionata (1926)
- A President Is Born (1928)
- Five and Ten (1929)
- Back Street (1931)
- Imitation of Life (1933)
- Anitra's Dance (1934)
- Great Laughter (1936)
- Lonely Parade (1942)
- Hallelujah (1944)
- The Hands of Veronica (1947)
- Anywoman (1950)
- The Name Is Mary (1951)
- The Man with One Head (1951)
- Family! (1960)
- God Must Be Sad (1961)
- Fool, Be Still (1964)

=== Autobiography ===
- Anatomy of Me: A Wonderer in Search of Herself (1958)

=== Other books ===
- No Food with My Meals (1935) (non-fiction autobiographical memoir about dieting)
- Today Is Ladies' Day (1939) (Home Institute booklet, offered through newspapers)
- White Christmas (1942) (short fiction, Christmas story)

=== Stage plays ===
- The Official Chaperon (1909, produced at Washington University in St. Louis)
- The Land of the Free (1917, co-written with Harriet Ford)
- Back Pay (1921, adaptation by Hurst of her 1919 short story of the same name)
- Humoresque (1923, adaptation by Hurst of her 1918 short story of the same name)
- It Is to Laugh (1927, adaptation by Hurst of her short story "The Gold in Fish" (1925)
- Four Daughters (1941, story credit; stage play was adapted by Frank Vreeland from Hurst's short story "Sister Act")

=== Film credits ===
- Humoresque (1920)
- Lummox (1930), based on the 1923 novel; also dialogue
- Symphony of Six Million (1932), based on the story "Night Bell"
- Back Street (1932), based on the novel
- Imitation of Life (1934), based on the novel
- Back Street (1941), based on the novel
- Humoresque (1946), based on the story
- Imitation of Life (1959), based on the novel

== Bibliography ==
- Tropiano, Stephen (2002). The Prime Time Closet: A History of Gays and Lesbians on TV. New York: Applause Theatre and Cinema Books. ISBN 1-55783-557-8.
