= 12th Directors Guild of America Awards =

- Date: 1960
- Country: United States
- Presented by: Directors Guild of America

Highlights
- Best Director Feature Film: Ben-Hur – William Wyler
- Best Director Television: The Scarface Mob – Phil Karlson
- Website: https://www.dga.org/Awards/History/1950s/1959.aspx?value=1959

The 12th Directors Guild of America Awards, honoring the outstanding directorial achievements in film and television in 1959, were presented in 1960.

== Winners and nominees ==
=== Film ===
Feature Film

William Wyler – Ben-Hur

- Charles Barton – The Shaggy Dog
- Frank Capra – A Hole in the Head
- Richard Fleischer – Compulsion
- John Ford – The Horse Soldiers
- Howard Hawks – Rio Bravo
- Alfred Hitchcock – North by Northwest
- Leo McCarey – Rally Round the Flag, Boys!
- Otto Preminger – Anatomy of a Murder
- Douglas Sirk – Imitation of Life
- George Stevens – The Diary of Anne Frank
- Billy Wilder – Some Like It Hot
- Fred Zinnemann – The Nun's Story

=== Television ===
Television

Phil Karlson – Westinghouse Desilu Playhouse for The Untouchables

- John Brahm – The Twilight Zone for "Time Enough at Last"
- Robert Florey – Westinghouse Desilu Playhouse for "The Innocent Assassin"
- Tay Garnett – The Untouchables for "The Jake Lingle Killing"
- Christian Nyby – Wagon Train for "The Jenny Tannen Story"
- Don Weis – General Electric Theater for "Survival"

=== D.W. Griffith Award ===
- George Stevens
