= Imitation of Life (novel) =

1933 novel by Fannie Hurst

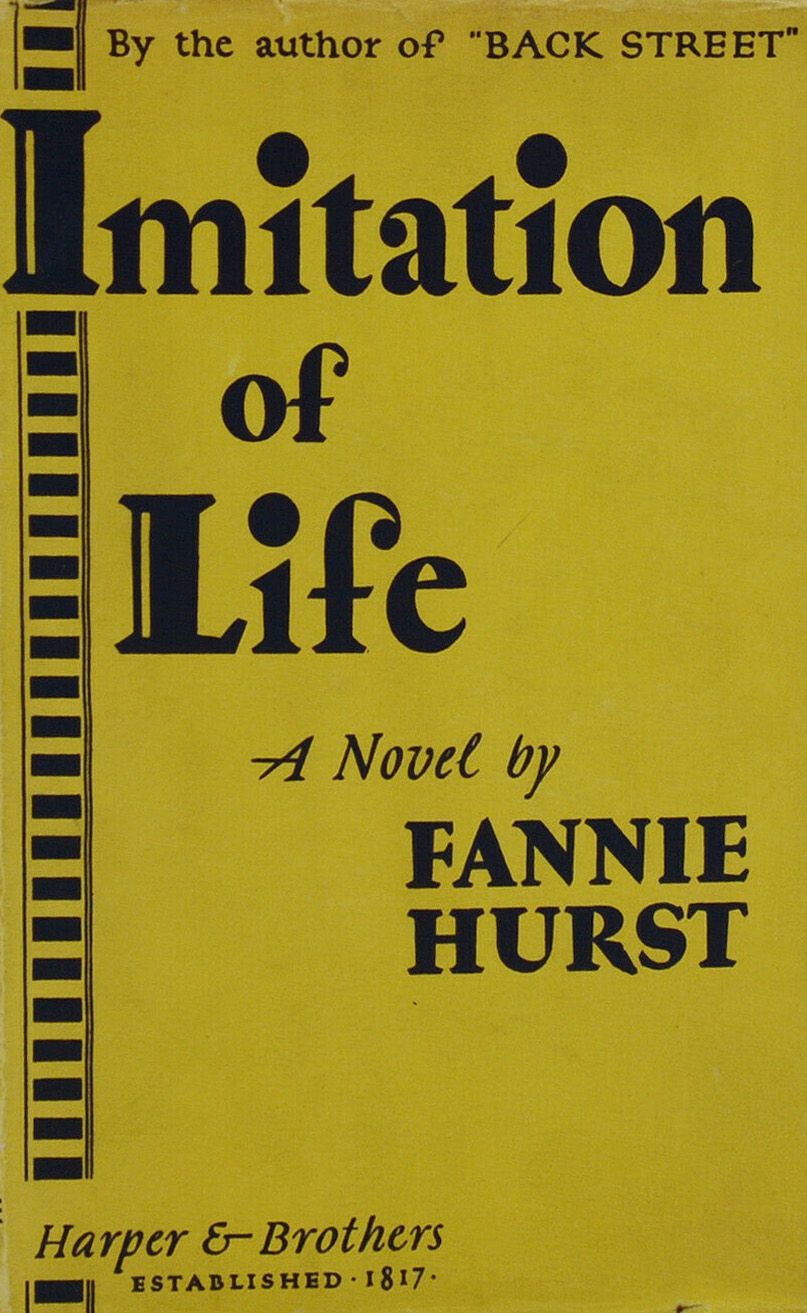
- First edition dust jacket cover
- Author: Fannie Hurst
- Language: English
- Genre: Novel
- Publisher: P.F. Collier
- Publication date: 1933
- Publication place: United States
- Media type: Print (hardback and paperback)

Imitation of Life is a 1933 novel by Fannie Hurst that was adapted into two films for Universal Pictures: a 1934 film, and a 1959 remake. The novel, which deals with issues of race, class and gender, was originally serialized in 1932 in the magazine Pictorial Review under the title "Sugar House".

== Synopsis ==
Set in the 1910s at "the Shore" of New Jersey, the novel explores issues of race and class in early 20th-century United States. Bea Chipley is a quiet, mousy Atlantic City teenage girl whose mother dies, leaving her to keep house for her father (Mr. Chipley) and Benjamin Pullman, a boarder who peddles ketchup and relish on the boardwalk and sells maple syrup door-to-door. Within a year, her father and Pullman decide that she should marry Pullman; she soon becomes pregnant and has a daughter named Jessie. Her father suffers an incapacitating stroke, confining him to a wheelchair, and Pullman is killed in a train accident. Bea is left to fend for her father and Jessie by herself.

She takes in boarders to defray expenses as well as peddles Pullman's maple syrup door-to-door, using his "B. Pullman" business cards to avoid the ubiquitous sexism of the 1910s. To care for her infant daughter and disabled father, Bea Pullman hires Delilah, an African-American mammy figure, who has an infant daughter Peola. The girl has "light skin" (as described then).

As Delilah is a master waffle-maker, Bea capitalizes on Delilah's skills to open a "B. Pullman" waffle restaurant. It attracts many of the tourists at the Shore. She eventually builds a nationwide and then international chain of highly successful restaurants. Frank Flake, a young man intent on entering medical school, becomes Bea's business manager.

Jessie and Peola have grown up side by side. Peola is painfully aware of the tension between her white appearance and black racial identity. She continually attempts to pass as white to gain wider advantages. Disturbed by her daughter's unhappiness, Delilah encourages the girl to take pride in her black "race." Eventually, after living in Seattle for several years as a white woman, Peola severs all ties with her family. She marries a white man and moves to Bolivia to pass permanently. Heartbroken, Delilah dies.

Bea falls in love with Flake, who is eight years her junior. Jessie, by now in her late teens, comes home for a visit just as Bea is planning on selling the "B. Pullman" chain and marrying Flake. The three are mired in a love triangle, resulting in a tragic ending that leaves Bea alone.

== Historical context ==
From the turn of the 20th century until the Supreme Court ruled in Loving v. Virginia (1967), numerous Southern states passed laws enforcing a "one-drop rule", requiring that persons of any known African ancestry had to be classified in records as black. Only black and white were recognized as racial categories, and blacks were restricted by racial segregation laws. Virginia enacted a law regarding "passing" in 1924.

Hurst stated that her novel was written because of a "consciousness" that came from how African-American soldiers had fought for their country in World War I even though they were discriminated against at home.

== Literary significance and criticism ==
Hurst was a Jewish woman and supporter of feminist causes. She also supported African Americans in their struggle for greater equality. She was deeply involved in the Harlem Renaissance, especially with Zora Neale Hurston. Hurst helped sponsor Hurston in her first year at Barnard College and employed Hurston briefly as an executive secretary. The two traveled together on road trips that may have contributed to Hurst's understanding of racial discrimination. Both Hurston and Langston Hughes claimed to like Imitation of Life, though both reversed their opinion after Sterling Allen Brown lambasted both the book and the 1934 film adaptation in a review entitled "Imitation of Life: Once a Pancake", a reference to a line in the first film.

The novel Imitation of Life continues to provoke controversy, as some read it as heavy-handed stereotyping, while others see it as a more subtle and subversive satire of and commentary on race, sex, and class in early 20th-century America. The book was adapted twice as film, in 1934 and 1959. Both the novel and films have remained deeply embedded in the American consciousness. In 1970, Toni Morrison named one of her characters "Pecola" in her novel The Bluest Eye.

The novel version has Peola leave for good, while in both films, the Peola character (named Sarah Jane in the second film) returns, attends her mother's funeral, and shows remorse. Molly Hiro contends the "premature removal of Peola" from the novel version of the story "not only allows her successfully to escape the 'blackness' she has resisted, but also keeps the character at a distance from readers, thereby rendering her incapable of representing a legible message about racial authenticity."

== Film, TV and theatrical adaptations ==
- 1934 – Imitation of Life directed by John M. Stahl
- 1959 – Imitation of Life directed by Douglas Sirk
- 1992 – De Frente al Sol produced by Carla Estrada

== Novel publication details ==
- 1933, US, P.F. Collier (ISBN NA), Pub date ? ? 1933, hardback (First edition)
- 1990, US, Borgo Press (ISBN 0-8095-9011-5), Pub date ? December 1990, hardback
- 1990, UK, HarperCollins (ISBN 0-06-096365-4), Pub date ? February 1990, paperback
- 2005, US, Duke University Press (ISBN 0-8223-3324-4), Pub date 15 January 2005, paperback
