= Brooke Kroeger =

Journalist, author, and professor

- Education: Boston University; Columbia University

Brooke Kroeger is an American journalist, writer, and professor emerita at New York University. She has written books on Nellie Bly, Fannie Hurst, and most recently a 2023 book on women in journalism.

== Education and career ==
Kroeger as a B.S. in journalism and political science from Boston University (1971), and an M.S. in journalism from Columbia University (1972).

Kroeger has worked as a journalist with Newsday, and New York Newsday. For eleven years she worked for United Press International, including serving as chief editor for Europe, the Middle East, and Africa while she was based on London, and serving as bureau chief while she was based in Tel Aviv.

Kroeger taught at New York University from 1998 until 2021, and served as the first director of the Arthur L. Carter Journalism Institute. As of 2023, Kroeger is professor emerita at New York University.

== Selected publications ==
- Kroeger, Brooke (1994). Nellie Bly: Daredevil, Reporter. Times Books. ISBN 9780812919738.
- Kroeger, Brooke (1998). Fannie: The Talent for Success of Writer Fannie Hurst. ISBN 978-0812924978.
- Kroeger, Brooke (2003). Passing: When People Can't Be Who They Are. PublicAffairs. ISBN 978-1891620997.
- Kroeger, Brooke (2012). Undercover Reporting : The Truth About Deception. Northwestern University Press. ISBN 978-0-8101-2619-0.
- Kroeger, Brooke (2017). The Suffragents: How Women Used Men to Get the Vote. State University of New York Press. ISBN 9781438466309.
- Kroeger, Brooke (2023). Undaunted How Women Changed American Journalism. Penguin Random House. ISBN 9780525659143.
