= Imitation of Life (1934 film) =

1934 film by John M. Stahl

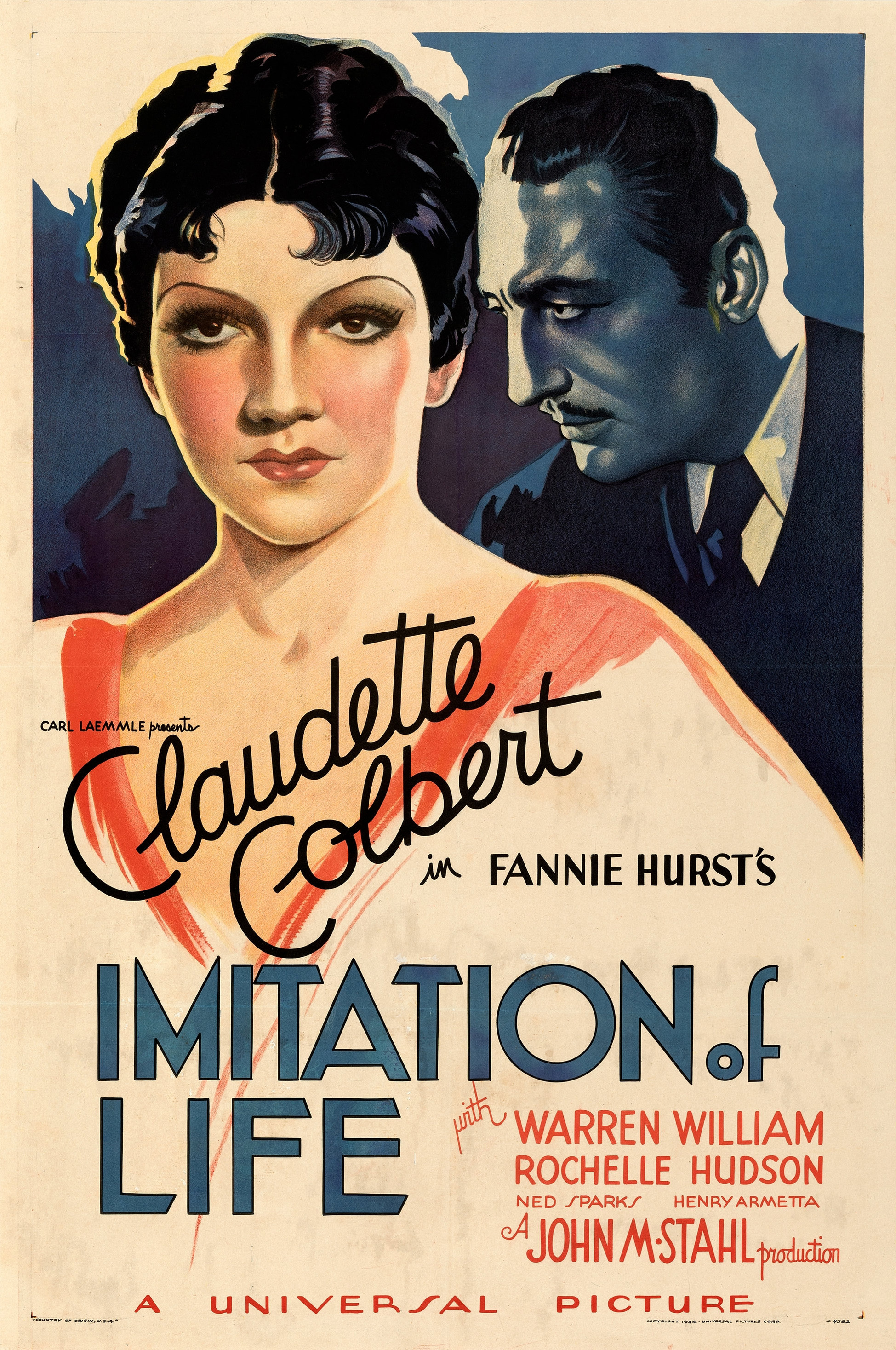
- Theatrical release poster
- Directed by: John M. Stahl
- Screenplay by: William J. Hurlbut
- Based on: Imitation of Life; 1933 novel by Fannie Hurst
- Produced by: John M. Stahl; Carl Laemmle, Jr.
- Starring: Claudette Colbert; Warren William; Rochelle Hudson; Ned Sparks; Henry Armetta
- Cinematography: Merritt B. Gerstad
- Edited by: Philip Cahn; Maurice Wright
- Music by: Heinz Roemheld
- Production company: Universal Pictures
- Distributed by: Universal Pictures
- Release date: November 26, 1934
- Running time: 111 minutes
- Country: United States
- Language: English

Imitation of Life is a 1934 American melodrama film directed by John M. Stahl. The screenplay by William Hurlbut, based on the 1933 novel by Fannie Hurst, was augmented by eight additional uncredited writers, including Preston Sturges and Finley Peter Dunne. The film stars Claudette Colbert, Warren William, Rochelle Hudson, Ned Sparks, Fredi Washington, and Louise Beavers.

The film was originally released by Universal Pictures on November 26, 1934, and re-released in 1936. A 1959 remake was directed by Douglas Sirk. In 2005, Imitation of Life was selected for preservation in the United States National Film Registry being deemed "culturally, historically, or aesthetically significant". It was also named by Time in 2007 as one of "The 25 Most Important Films on Race". It was nominated for Best Picture, Best Assistant Director, and Best Sound Recording at the 7th Academy Awards.

== Plot ==
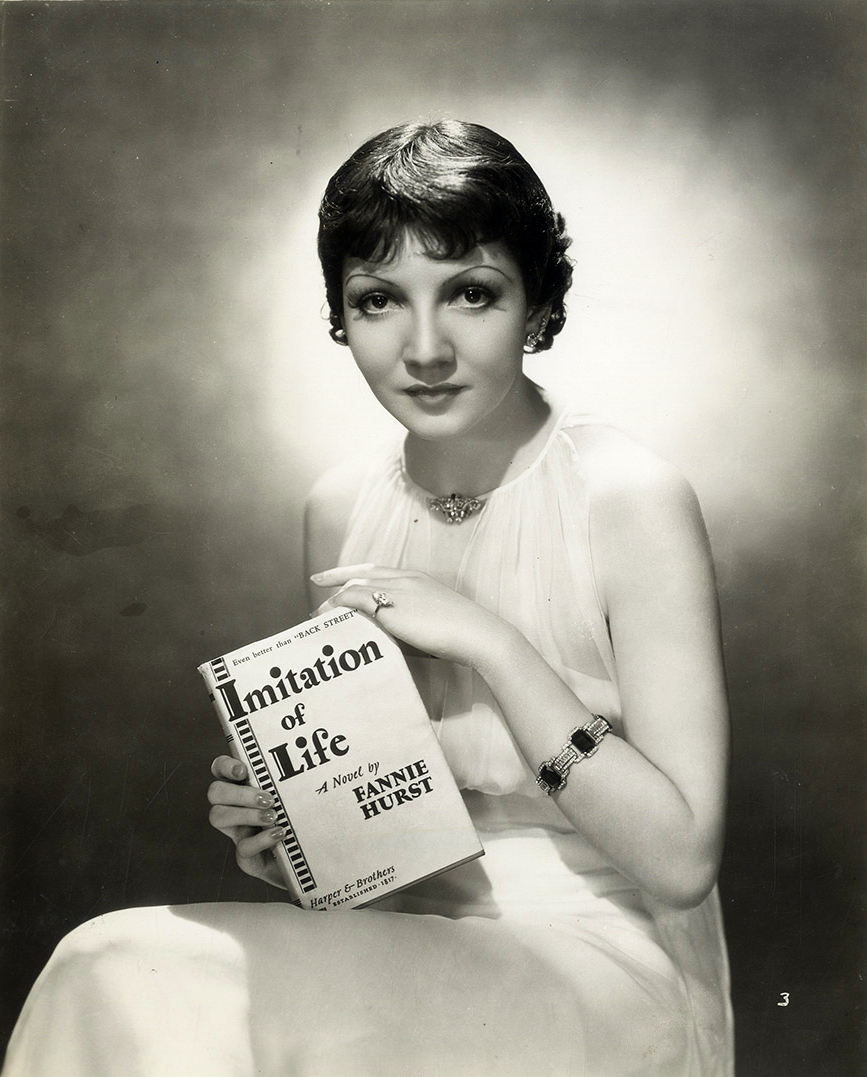
Claudette Colbert in a publicity still of the film.

Widow Bea Pullman is continuing her husband's business, selling cans of maple syrup door-to-door, and making little money. One day, black housekeeper Delilah Johnson misreads an advertisement and comes to the wrong house—Bea's.

Trying to reach her rubber duck, Bea's two-year-old daughter Jessie falls fully clothed into the bathtub, and Bea runs upstairs. When she returns, Delilah has fixed breakfast. Delilah explains that no one wants a housekeeper with a child, and introduces her daughter Peola, whose fair complexion conceals her ancestry. Bea cannot begin to afford help, so Delilah offers to keep house in exchange for room and board. The four become like family. They all particularly enjoy Delilah's pancakes, made from a secret family recipe.

Bea uses her business wiles to get a storefront and living quarters on the boardwalk refurbished on credit, and they open a pancake restaurant where Delilah and Bea cook in the front window. (Note: Signage indicates that they are on the Jersey Shore in Pleasantville. A title card mentioning Atlantic City was removed.)

Five years later, they are debt-free. The little girls are good friends, but one day Jessie calls Peola "black". Peola runs into the apartment declaring that she is not black, will not be black, and that it is her mother who makes her black. Cradling her weeping daughter, Delilah tells Bea that this is simply the truth, and Peola has to learn to live with it. Peola's father, a light-skinned African American, had the same struggle, and it broke him. Delilah receives another blow when she finds out that Peola has been "passing" at school.

One day, Elmer Smith, a hungry passerby, offers Bea a two-word idea in exchange for a meal: "Box it [the flour]." Bea hires him, and they set up the successful "Delilah's Pancake Flour" business. Delilah refuses to sign the incorporation papers, and when Bea tells her that she can now afford her own home, Delilah is crushed. She does not want to break up the family. So the two friends continue to live together, and Bea puts Delilah's share in the bank.

Ten years pass. Both women are wealthy and share a mansion in New York City. Delilah becomes a mainstay of the African-American community, supporting many lodges and charitable organizations and her church. She tries to give Peola every advantage, including sending her to a fine Negro college in the South, but Peola runs away.

Meanwhile, Elmer arranges for Bea to meet an ichthyologist, Stephen Archer; they hit it off immediately and plan to marry. Then eighteen-year-old Jessie comes home on college vacation, and during the five days it takes for Bea and Delilah to find Peola, she falls in love with Stephen.

Peola has taken a job in a segregated restaurant, serving white customers only, in Virginia. When her mother and Bea find her, she denies Delilah.

Peola tells her mother that she is going away, never to return, so she can pass as a white woman, and if they meet on the street, her mother must not speak to her. Delilah is heartbroken and takes to her bed, murmuring Peola's name and forgiving her before eventually succumbing to heartbreak.

Delilah has the grand funeral she always wanted, with marching bands and a horse-drawn white silk hearse, and all the lodges processing in a slow march. (Note: Delilah does not name her charities. If the film was authentic about uniforms it might be possible to identify them from her funeral procession. The Black Elks exemplify the work done by such organizations.) (Note: The charities were identified by the Chicago Defender as “Negro lodges, including the Knights Templars, Elks, Calanthians, Daughters of Elks, and Households of Ruth, all dressed in their customary uniforms and presiding with dignity”) Her coffin is carried from the church to the hearse through the saber arch of an honor guard, and a remorseful, sobbing Peola rushes to embrace it, begging her dead mother to forgive her. Bea and Jessie gather her into their arms and take her into the car with them.

Peola later decides to return to college. Bea asks Stephen to wait, promising to come to him after Jessie is over her infatuation. After Stephen leaves, Jessie appears to her mother and gives her Delilah's lucky rabbit's foot that she found, causing Jessie to ask how they met. Bea starts to tell Jessie about their meeting while she was given a bath as a toddler and giving her insistent demands for her "quack quack" duck toy.

== Cast ==
- Claudette Colbert as Beatrice "Bea" Pullman
- Louise Beavers as Delilah Johnson
- Fredi Washington as Peola Johnson, age 19
- Dorothy Black as Peola Johnson, age 9
- Sebie Hendricks as Peola Johnson, age 4
- Rochelle Hudson as Jessie Pullman, age 18
- Marilyn Knowlden as Jessie Pullman, age 8
- Juanita Quigley as Baby Jessie Pullman, age 3
- Warren William as Stephen "Steve" Archer
- Ned Sparks as Elmer Smith
- Alan Hale as Martin, the Furniture Man
- Henry Armetta as The Painter
- Wyndham Standing as Jarvis, Beatrice's Butler
- William Austin as Englishman at Party (uncredited)
- Edgar Norton as Butler at Party (uncredited)
- Alma Tell as Mrs. Craven (uncredited)

Cast notes:

- Child actress Jane Withers has a small part as a classmate of Peola, her fifth film appearance.
- Clarence Wilson appears uncredited as the landlord of the restaurant Bea rents.
- Franklin Pangborn appears uncredited as "Mr. Carven"

== Production ==
Fannie Hurst's inspiration in writing her novel Imitation of Life was a road trip to Canada she took with her friend, the African-American short-story writer and folklorist Zora Neale Hurston. The novel was originally to be called Sugar House but was changed just before publication. Molly Hiro of the University of Portland wrote that the script of this film "closely followed" the storyline of the original novel.

Universal borrowed Warren William from Warner Bros. for the male lead, but the studio had first wanted Paul Lukas for the part. The parents of the child playing "Jessie" as a baby changed her name from "Baby Jane" to "Juanita Quigley" during production of the film. Claudette Colbert was borrowed from Paramount.

Universal had difficulty receiving approval from the censors at the Hays Office for the original script they submitted for Imitation of Life. Joseph Breen objected to the elements of miscegenation in the story, which "not only violates the Production Code but is very dangerous from the standpoint both of industry and public policy." He rejected the project, writing, "Hurst's novel dealing with a partly colored girl who wants to pass as white violates the clause covering miscegenation in spirit, if not in fact!" The Production Code Administration's (PCA) censors had difficulty in "negotiating how boundaries of racial difference should be cinematically constructed to be seen, and believed, on the screen."

Their concern was the character of Peola, in whose person miscegenation was represented by this young woman considered black, but with sufficient white ancestry to pass as white and the desire to do so. Susan Courtney says that the PCA participated in "Hollywood's ongoing desire to remake interracial desire, an historical fact, as always already having been a taboo." In addition, she explains the quandary imagined by the censors: "the PCA reads Peola's light skin, and her passing, as signifiers of 'miscegenation.' By conflating miscegenation and passing in this way, the censors effectively attempt to extend the Code's ban on desire across black and white racial boundaries to include a ban on identification across those boundaries as well."

They also objected to some language in the script, and a scene where a young black man is nearly lynched for approaching a white woman who he believed had invited his attention. Breen continued to refuse to approve the script up to July 17, when the director had already been shooting the film for two weeks. Ultimately the ending of the film differed from the novel. While in the novel Peola leaves the area never to return, in the film she returns, going to her mother's funeral and showing remorse. A scene stated by Hiro to be "virtually identical" was used in the second film adaptation.

Imitation of Life was in production from June 27 to September 11, 1934, and was released on November 26 of that year.

All versions of Imitation of Life issued by Universal after 1938, including TV, VHS and DVD versions, feature re-done title cards in place of the originals. Missing from all of these prints is a title card with a short prologue, which was included in the original release. It read:

Atlantic City, in 1919, was not just a boardwalk, rolling-chairs and expensive hotels where bridal couples spent their honeymoons. A few blocks from the gaiety of the famous boardwalk, permanent citizens of the town lived and worked and reared families just like people in less glamorous cities.

The scene in which Elmer approaches Bea with the idea to sell Delilah's pancake mix to retail customers refers to a legend about the origins of Coca-Cola's success. It has been credited with strengthening the urban myth about the secret of Coke's success – that is, to "bottle it".

== Themes ==
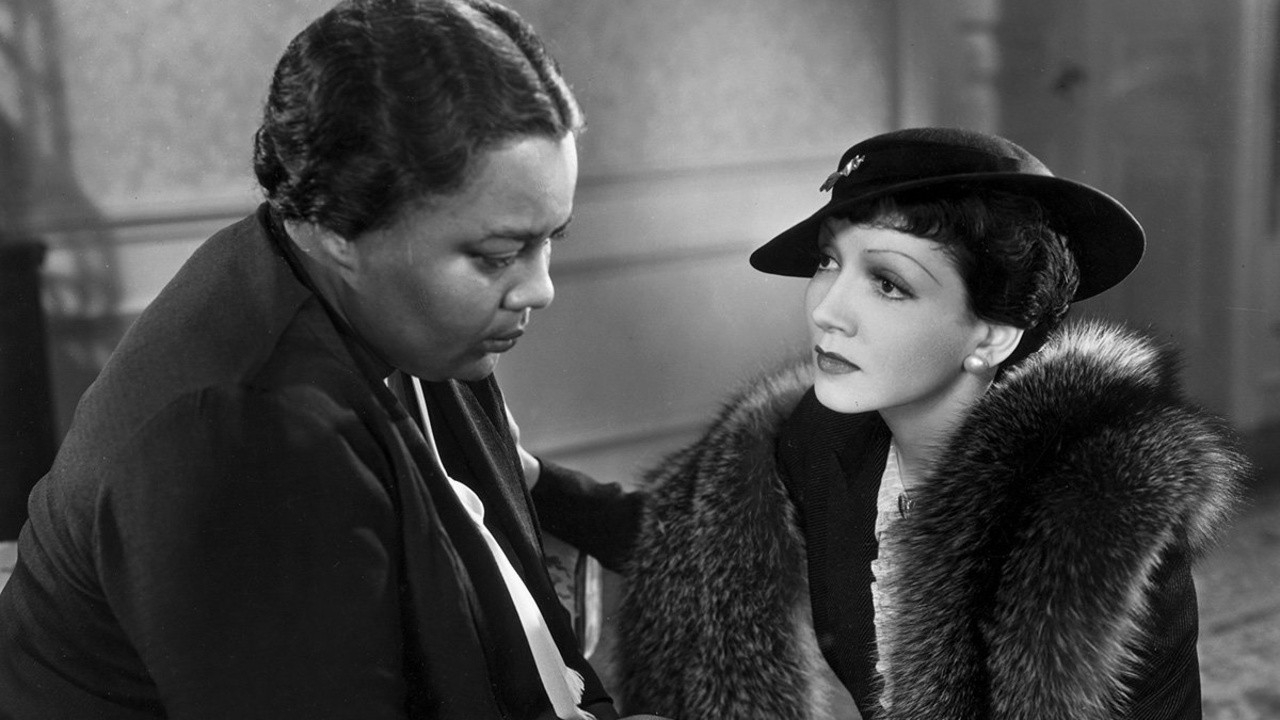
Louise Beavers and Colbert in a still of the film.

TCM's Jeff Stafford observes that this film "was ahead of its time in presenting single women as successful entrepreneurs in a business traditionally run by men."

The themes of the film, to the modern eye, deal with very important issues—passing, the role of skin color in the black community and tensions between its light-skinned and dark-skinned members, the role of black servants in white families, and maternal affection.

Some scenes seem to have been filmed to highlight the fundamental unfairness of Delilah's social position—for example, while living in Bea's fabulous NYC mansion, Delilah descends down the shadowy stairs to the basement where her rooms are. Bea, dressed in the height of fashion, floats up the stairs to her rooms, whose luxury was built from the success of Delilah's recipe. Others highlight the similarities between the two mothers, both of whom adore their daughters and are brought to grief by the younger women's actions. Some scenes seem to mock Delilah, because of her supposed ignorance about her financial interests and her willingness to be in a support role, but the two women have built an independent business together. In dying and in death—especially with the long processional portraying a very dignified African-American community—Delilah is treated with great respect.

According to Jean-Pierre Coursodon in his essay on John M. Stahl in American Directors,

Fredi Washington ... reportedly received a great deal of mail from young blacks thanking her for having expressed their intimate concerns and contradictions so well. One may add that Stahl's film was somewhat unique in its casting of a black actress in this kind of part – which was to become a Hollywood stereotype of sorts.

Later films dealing with mulatto women, including the 1959 remake of Imitation of Life, often cast white women in the roles.

== Reception ==
This poster for a 1949 re-release prominently features Louise Beavers, and appears to have been intended for theaters serving a Black audience.

Imitation of Life was nominated for three Academy Awards – Best Picture, Best Assistant Director for Scott R. Beal, and Best Sound, Recording for Theodore Soderberg.

On Rotten Tomatoes, the film has an aggregate score of 87% based on 47 positive and 7 negative critic reviews. The website's consensus reads: "Imitation of Life isn't always subtle, but even as it tugs at the heartstrings, this socially conscious melodrama effectively explores Jim Crow-era racial taboos." TCM's Jeff Stafford, observing that "Imitation of Life is certainly one of [Beavers'] best performances and should have been nominated for an Oscar", recalled that when the picture came out, "Columnist Jimmy Fiddler [sic] was one of many who objected to this oversight and wrote, 'I also lament the fact that the motion picture industry has not set aside racial prejudice in naming actresses. I don't see how it is possible to overlook the magnificent portrayal of the Negro actress, Louise Beavers, who played the mother in Imitation of Life. If the industry chooses to ignore Miss Beavers' performance, please let this reporter, born and bred in the South, tender a special award of praise to Louise Beavers for the finest performance of 1934."

At the time of the picture's release, Variety observed: "[The] most arresting part of the picture and overshadowing the conventional romance ... is the tragedy of Aunt Delilah's girl born to a white skin and Negro blood. This subject has never been treated upon the screen before. ... It seems very probable the picture may make some slight contribution to the cause of greater tolerance and humanity in the racial question." "Picture is stolen by the Negress, Beavers, whose performance is masterly. This lady can troupe. She takes the whole scale of human emotions from joy to anguish and never sounds a false note."

The Literary Digest review at the time noted that "In Imitation of Life, the screen is extremely careful to avoid its most dramatic theme, obviously because it fears its social implications. ... The real story [is] ... that of the beautiful and rebellious daughter of the loyal negro friend. ... Obviously she is the most interesting person in the cast. They [the producers] appear to be fond of her mother, because she is of the meek type of old-fashioned Negro that, as they say, 'knows his place', but the daughter is too bitter and lacking in resignation for them."

In 2005, Imitation of Life was selected for preservation in the United States National Film Registry of the Library of Congress. In February 2007 Time magazine included it among "The 25 Most Important Films on Race", as part of the magazine's celebration of Black History Month.

Hiro wrote that the film served "as a classic melodrama" which used a "melodramatic mode" and therefore got a reputation where in the ending scene "everyone cries".
