= Imitation of Life (1959 film) =

1959 film by Douglas Sirk

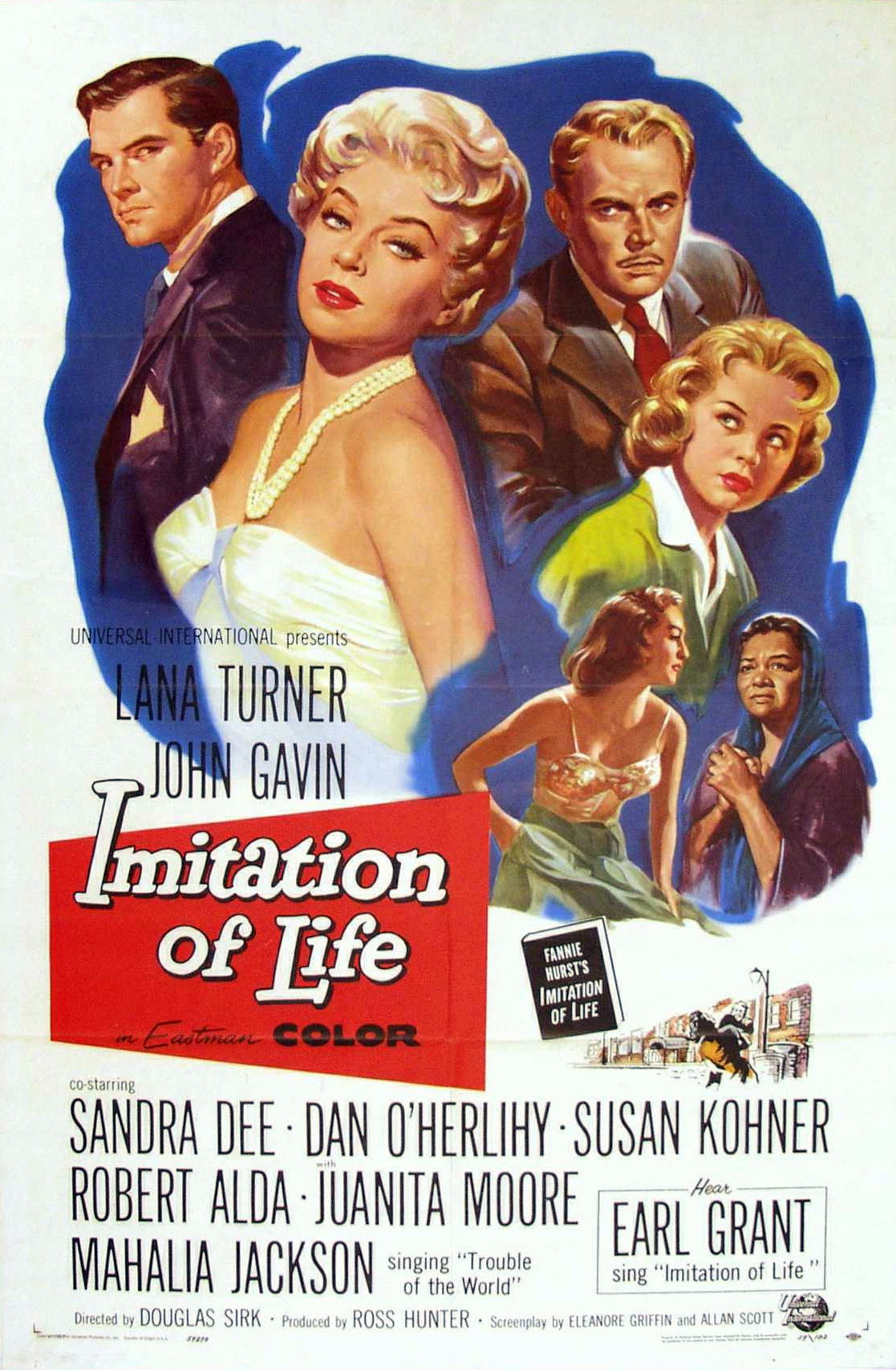
- Theatrical release poster by Reynold Brown
- Directed by: Douglas Sirk
- Screenplay by: Eleanore Griffin; Allan Scott
- Based on: Imitation of Life by Fannie Hurst
- Produced by: Ross Hunter
- Starring: Lana Turner; John Gavin; Sandra Dee; Dan O'Herlihy; Susan Kohner; Robert Alda; Juanita Moore; Mahalia Jackson
- Cinematography: Russell Metty
- Edited by: Milton Carruth
- Music by: Frank Skinner
- Production company: Universal-International
- Distributed by: Universal Pictures
- Release dates: March 17, 1959 (Chicago); April 30, 1959 (United States)
- Running time: 125 minutes
- Country: United States
- Language: English
- Budget: $1.2 million
- Box office: $6.4 million (US and Canada rentals)

Imitation of Life is a 1959 American melodrama film directed by Douglas Sirk and produced by Ross Hunter. It stars Lana Turner and John Gavin, with Sandra Dee, Dan O'Herlihy, Susan Kohner, Robert Alda, and Juanita Moore in supporting roles. Gospel music singer Mahalia Jackson appears as a church choir soloist. It is the second film adaptation of the 1933 novel by Fannie Hurst, following the 1934 film directed by John M. Stahl.

Released by Universal Pictures, Imitation of Life was Sirk's final Hollywood film and dealt with issues of race, class and gender. Kohner and Moore each received Academy Award and Golden Globe Award nominations for Best Supporting Actress for their performances, with Kohner winning the Golden Globe Award.

In 2015, the United States Library of Congress selected Imitation of Life (1959) for preservation in the National Film Registry, finding it "culturally, historically, or aesthetically significant". The 1934 version of Imitation of Life had previously been added to the National Film Registry in 2005.

== Plot ==
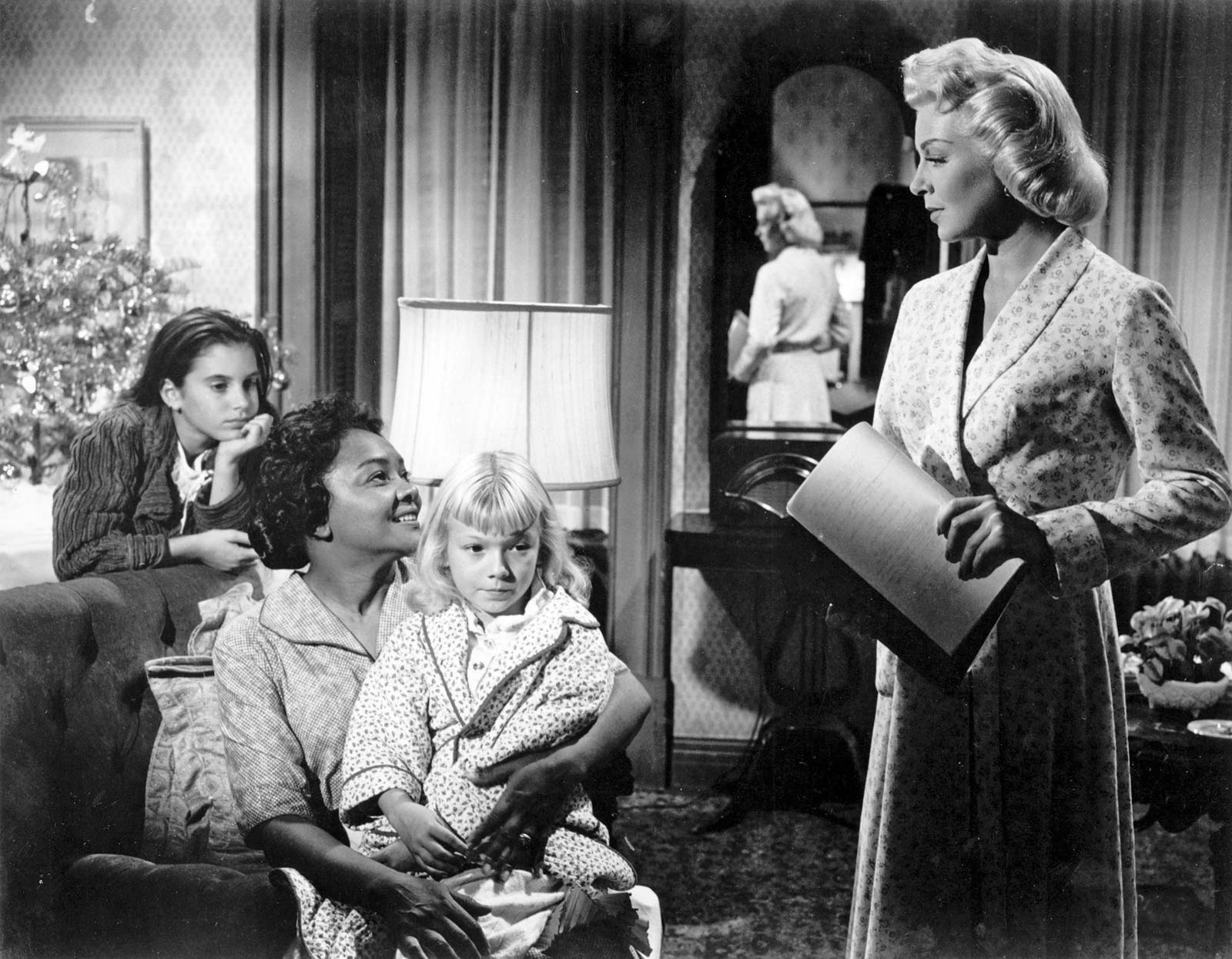
From left to right: Sarah Jane (Karin Dicker), Annie (Juanita Moore), Susie (Terry Burnham), and Lora (Lana Turner)

In 1947, white widowed mother and aspiring Broadway actress Lora Meredith meets photographer Steve Archer while frantically searching for her young daughter Susie at a crowded Coney Island beach. She eventually finds Susie in the care of Annie Johnson, a single Black mother with a light-skinned Black daughter, Sarah Jane, who is about Susie's age and rejects being identified as Black. Since Annie and Sarah Jane have nowhere to go, Lora invites the two to stay temporarily in her small New York City apartment. In exchange, Annie offers to keep house and look after Susie while Lora pursues an acting career.

Lora bluffs her way into the office of noted theatrical agent Allen Loomis, who attempts to solicit sexual favors from her, upsetting her. Lora and Steve begin a romance, but she rejects his marriage proposal and breaks up with him when he forbids her from meeting with Loomis, who has offered her a role in a new stage comedy by David Edwards, a well-known playwright. The play is a rousing success, and Lora receives critical acclaim for her performance. She and David become lovers.

For the next 10 years, Lora stars in a series of successful comedy plays written by David, becoming a highly regarded Broadway star and living in a luxurious home near New York City. Annie continues to live with her, serving as her nanny, housekeeper, confidante, and best friend. After rejecting David's latest script and marriage proposal, Lora takes a role in another writer's dramatic play, to great success.

At the play's after-party, Lora encounters Steve, whom she has not seen in a decade. The two slowly begin to rekindle their relationship. Steve is reintroduced to Susie and Sarah Jane, who are now teenagers. When Lora is cast to star in an Italian film, she entrusts Steve to look after Susie, who develops an unrequited crush on her mother's boyfriend.

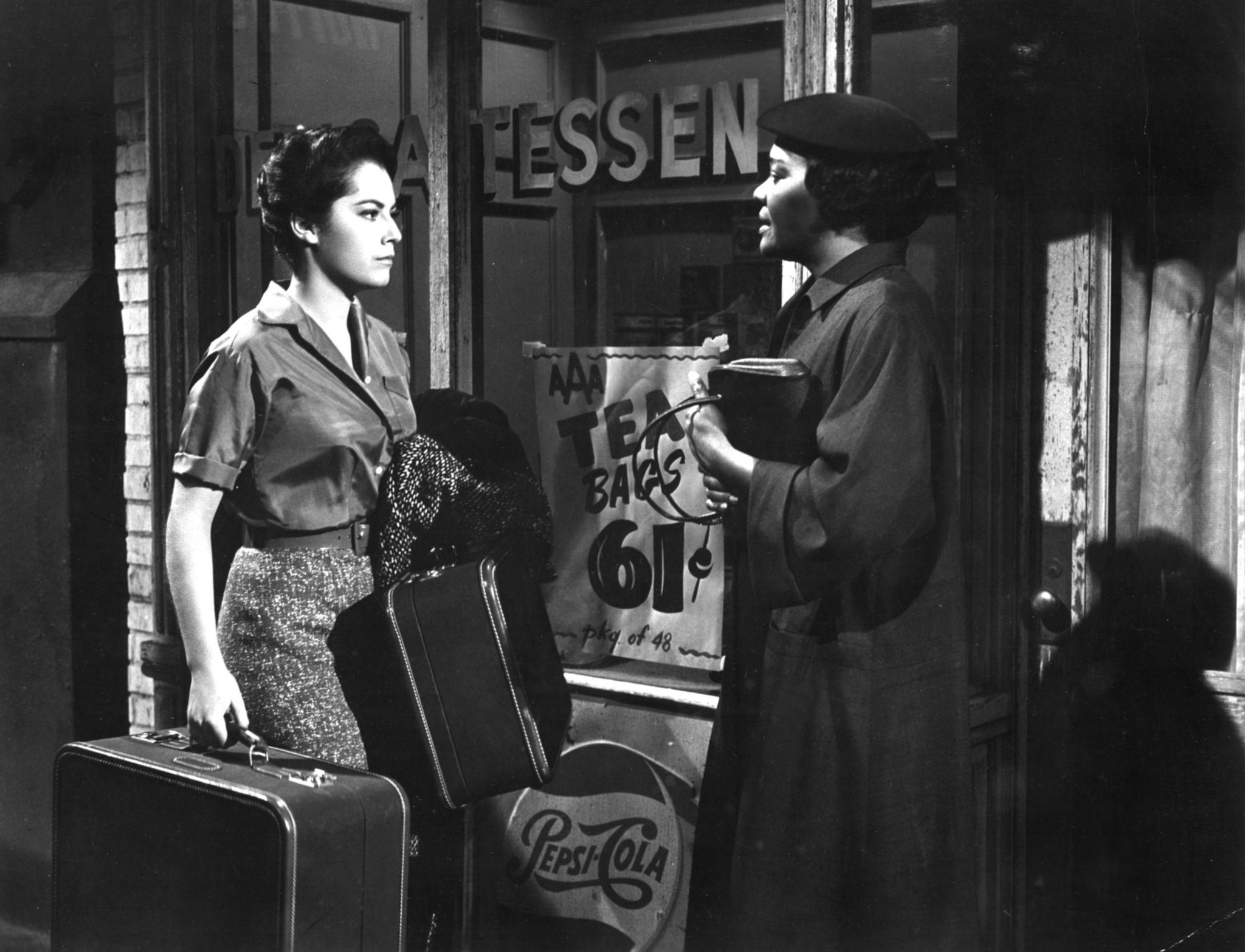
Sarah Jane (Susan Kohner) and Annie

Sarah Jane has been secretly dating a young white man, but he beats her after learning that her mother is Black. Some time later, she takes a job performing at a seedy Manhattan nightclub, lying to her mother that she is working at a library. When Annie learns the truth, she goes to the club to confront Sarah Jane. Humiliated, Sarah Jane runs away from home, leaving Annie distraught.

Upon returning from Italy, Lora asks Steve to hire a private detective to locate Sarah Jane. The detective finds her working as a chorus girl in Los Angeles under an assumed name. Increasingly ill, Annie flies out to see her daughter one last time and say goodbye. Sarah Jane is furious and insists that she is white, before they share an emotional embrace. When Sarah Jane's roommate interrupts them, Annie introduces herself as Sarah Jane's former nanny and leaves.

After returning to New York, Annie becomes bedridden. Lora and Susie look after her. Susie confides in Annie about her feelings for Steve, but is upset when Lora announces her plans to marry Steve. The next morning, Annie tells Lora of Susie's infatuation with Steve, leading Lora to confront Susie. When Susie accuses her mother of prioritizing her career over her, Lora offers to break up with Steve, but Susie chooses to leave New York and go to college in Denver.

As Annie dies, Lora breaks down in tears by her side. Lora grants Annie the lavish funeral that her friend had requested: in a large church, complete with a gospel choir, and followed by an elaborate traditional funeral procession with a band and four white horses drawing the hearse. Just before the procession sets off, Sarah Jane pushes through the crowd of mourners and throws herself on Annie's casket. She begs her mother's forgiveness, exclaiming, "I killed my mother!" Lora gently leads Sarah Jane into her limousine to join her, Susie, and Steve as the procession slowly travels through the crowded street. A large African-American crowd, dressed in the finery of their lodges and associations, silently watches.

== Cast ==
- Lana Turner as Lora Meredith
- John Gavin as Steve Archer
- Sandra Dee as Susie Meredith (age 16)
- Susan Kohner as Sarah Jane Johnson (age 18)
- Robert Alda as Allen Loomis
- Dan O'Herlihy as David Edwards
- Juanita Moore as Annie Johnson
- Karin Dicker as Sarah Jane Johnson (age 8)
- Terry Burnham as Susie Meredith (age 6)
- John Vivyan as young man
- Lee Goodman as photographer
- Ann Robinson as show girl
- Troy Donahue as Frankie
- Sandra Gould as receptionist
- Mahalia Jackson as choir soloist
- David Tomack as burly man
- Joel Fluellen as minister
- Jack Weston as stage manager
- Billy House as fat man
- Maida Severn as teacher
- Than Wyenn as Romano
- Peg Shirley as Fay

== History and production ==
The screenplay was written by Eleanore Griffin and Allan Scott. With director Douglas Sirk, they made changes to the story to reflect the society of 1959. As a result, the plot of the 1959 film differs from the 1933 novel and the 1934 film.

In the novel, the Lora character, Bea Pullman, became successful by commercial production of her maid Delilah's family waffle recipe, a pancake recipe in the 1934 film version. As a result, Bea, the white businesswoman, becomes rich. She offers Delilah 20% of the profits, but the woman declines and chooses to remain Bea's assistant. In the novel, Delilah's daughter Peola leaves the area for good. In both the films, the Black daughter returns for her mother's funeral, showing remorse. Molly Hiro described the 1959 scene as "virtually identical" to that of 1934.

In the 1950s there was increased activism in the Civil Rights Movement, with milestones such as the case of Brown v. Board of Education before the U.S. Supreme Court and the Montgomery bus boycott gaining national attention. In addition, more women had been working during and after World War II. At the same time, the writers acknowledged that racial discrimination and its inequities were still part of society.

They created a plot in which Lora becomes a Broadway star by her own talents, with Annie's assisting by being paid to serve as a nanny for Lora's child and general household manager. Producer Ross Hunter also was cannily aware that these plot changes would enable Lana Turner to model an array of glamorous costumes and jewels, something that would appeal to a female audience. Lana Turner's wardrobe for Imitation of Life cost over $1.078 million, making it one of the more expensive in cinema history to that time.

Although many actresses, most of them white, were screen-tested for the Sarah Jane 1959 role, Susan Kohner won it. She is of mixed Irish, Mexican, and Czech-Jewish ancestry. Her mother was actress Lupita Tovar, born in Mexico, and her father was Paul Kohner, a Czech-Jewish immigrant.

Karin Dicker made her debut in this film as the young Sarah Jane. Noted Black gospel singer Mahalia Jackson received "presenting" billing for her one scene, performing a version of "Trouble of the World" at Annie's funeral service.

== Release ==
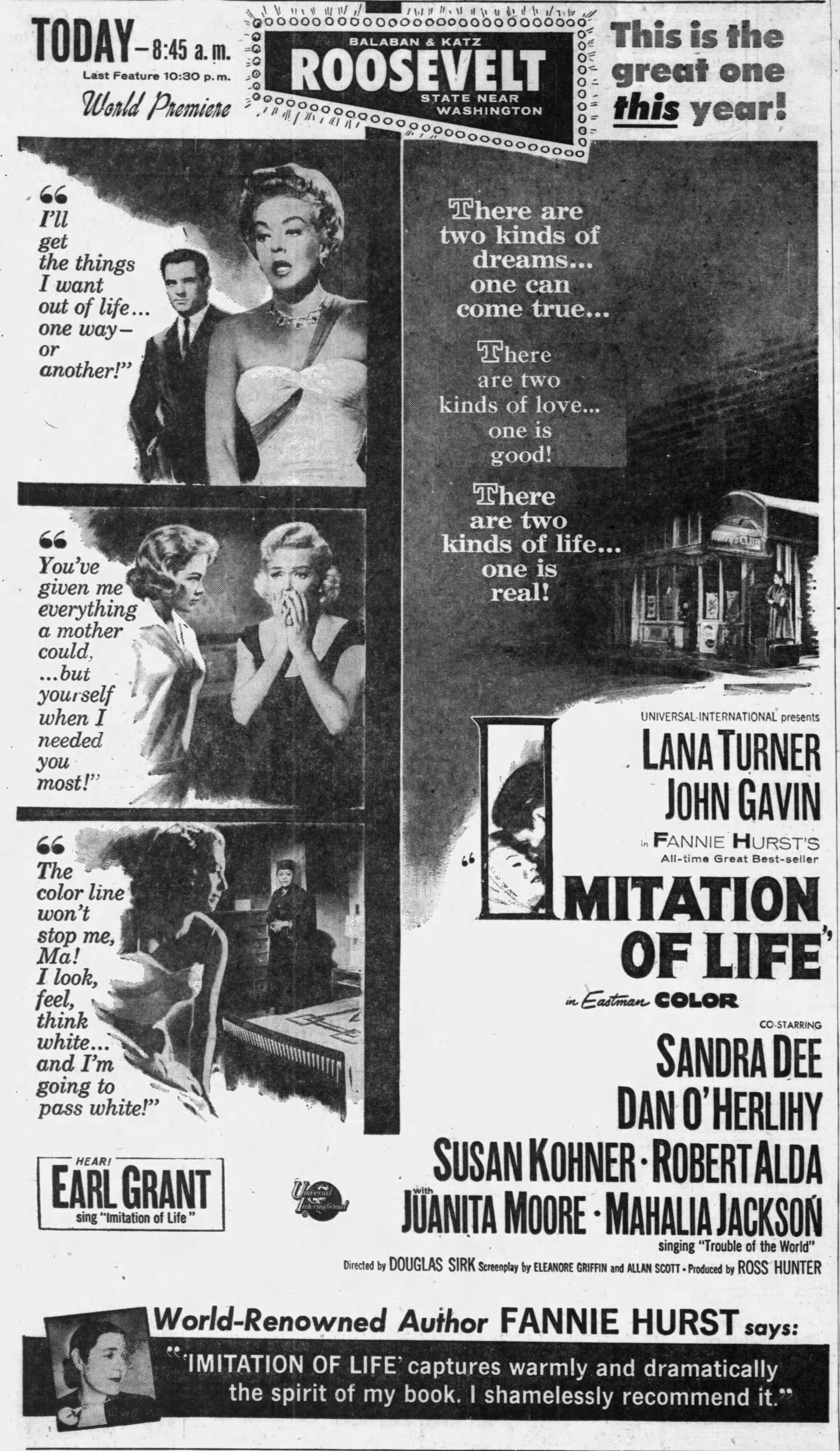
Theatrical advertisement from 1959.

Sirk's Imitation of Life premiered in Chicago on March 17, 1959, followed by Los Angeles on March 20 and New York City on April 17. Following its New York opening, it became number one in the US for two weeks before Universal put the film into general release on April 30.

=== Home media ===
Both the 1934 and 1959 films were issued in 2003 on a double-sided DVD from Universal Studios. A two-disc set of the films was issued by Universal in 2008. A Blu-ray with both films was released in April 2015. This edition has been re-mastered, and is not identical with earlier DVD releases.

Madman Entertainment released a three-disc DVD set in Australia, including the 1934 film version, as well as a video essay on the 1959 film by Sam Staggs.

== Reception and interpretation ==
=== Box office ===
Imitation of Life grossed $6.4 million between the United States and Canada.

=== Critical response ===
Although it was not well-reviewed upon its original release and was viewed as inferior to the original 1934 film version – many critics derided the film as a "soap opera" – Imitation of Life was the sixth highest-grossing film of 1959, grossing $6.4 million. It was Universal-International's top-grossing film that year. Hiro wrote that in contrast to the novel, this film and the previous film had received "far more critical attention". With a wider audience, the second film became "more famous" than the first.

Both Moore and Kohner were nominated for the 1959 Academy Award for Best Supporting Actress and the 1959 Golden Globe Award for Best Supporting Actress. While neither actress won the Academy Award, Kohner won the Golden Globe for her performance; she also won a Globe Award for Best New Actress. Moore won second place in the category of Top Female Supporting Performance at the 1959 Laurel Awards, and the film won Top Drama. Sirk was nominated for Outstanding Directing – Feature Film at the 12th Directors Guild of America Awards.

=== Modern assessment ===
Since the late 20th century, Imitation of Life has been re-evaluated by critics. It has been considered a masterpiece of Sirk's American career. Emanuel Levy has written "One of the four masterpieces directed in the 1950s, the visually lush, meticulously designed and powerfully acted Imitation of Life was the jewel in Sirk's crown, ending his Hollywood's career before he returned to his native Germany." Sirk provided the Annie–Sarah Jane relationship in his version with more screen time and more intensity than the characters were given in the 1930s versions of the story. Critics later commented that Juanita Moore and Susan Kohner stole the film from Turner. Sirk said that he had deliberately and subversively undercut Turner to draw focus toward the issues of the two black characters.

Sirk's treatment of racial and class issues is admired for what he caught of the times. In 1997, Rob Nelson wrote:

Basically, we're left to intuit that the black characters (and the movie) are themselves products of '50s-era racism – which explains the film's perspective, but hardly makes it less dizzying. Possibly thinking of W.E.B. Du Bois's notion of black American double-consciousness, critic Molly Haskell once described Imitation's double-vision: "The mixed-race girl's agonizing quest for her identity is not seen from her point of view as much as it is mockingly reflected in the fun house mirrors of the culture from which she is hopelessly alienated."

On the review aggregator website Rotten Tomatoes, 82% of 33 critics' reviews are positive. The website's consensus reads: "Douglas Sirk enriches this lush remake of Imitation of Life with racial commentary and a sharp edge, yielding a challenging melodrama with the power to devastate." Metacritic, which uses a weighted average, assigned the film a score of 87 out of 100, based on 15 critics, indicating "universal acclaim".

In 2015, Imitation of Life ranked 37th on BBC's "100 Greatest American Films" list, voted on by film critics from around the world.

=== Accolades ===
Award	Category	Recipient(s)	Result	Ref.
Academy Awards	Best Supporting Actress	Susan Kohner	Nominated	
Academy Awards	Best Supporting Actress	Juanita Moore	Nominated	
Directors Guild of America Awards	Outstanding Directorial Achievement in Motion Pictures	Douglas Sirk	Nominated	
Golden Globe Awards	Best Supporting Actress – Motion Picture	Susan Kohner	Won	
Golden Globe Awards	Best Supporting Actress – Motion Picture	Juanita Moore	Nominated	
Laurel Awards	Top Drama	Imitation of Life	Won	
Laurel Awards	Top Female Supporting Performance	Juanita Moore	Nominated	
Laurel Awards	Top Cinematography – Color	Russell Metty	Nominated	
National Film Preservation Board	National Film Registry	Imitation of Life	Inducted	

== In popular culture ==
Todd Haynes' Far from Heaven (2002) is an homage to Sirk's work, in particular All That Heaven Allows (1955) and Imitation of Life.

The 1969 Diana Ross & the Supremes song "I'm Livin' in Shame" is based upon this film.

R.E.M.'s 2001 song "Imitation of Life" took its title from the film, despite none of the band members having seen it.

== See also ==
- List of American films of 1959
- List of cult films
- Whitewashing in film
