= Back Street (1932 film) =

1932 film directed by John M. Stahl

- Theatrical release poster
- Directed by: John M. Stahl
- Written by: Gladys Lehman; Lynn Starling; Gene Fowler (uncredited); Ben Hecht (uncredited)
- Based on: Back Street; 1931 novel by Fannie Hurst
- Produced by: Carl Laemmle Jr. E.M. Asher (associate producer)
- Starring: Irene Dunne; John Boles
- Cinematography: Karl Freund
- Edited by: Milton Carruth
- Music by: James Dietrich
- Distributed by: Universal Pictures
- Release date: August 4, 1932
- Running time: 93 minutes
- Country: United States
- Language: English
- Budget: $426,000
- Box office: $900,000 (U.S. and Canada rentals)

Back Street is a 1932 American pre-Code drama film directed by John M. Stahl and starring Irene Dunne and John Boles. Based on the best-selling novel of the same title by Fannie Hurst, it tells the story of a woman who spends her life as the secret mistress of a wealthy married man. The devotion and love of the woman to the married man determines that she will be the “back streets” of him in the whole life; a story of a love that was not destined. This was the first of three film versions of Hurst's novel; remakes were released in 1941 and 1961.

== Plot ==
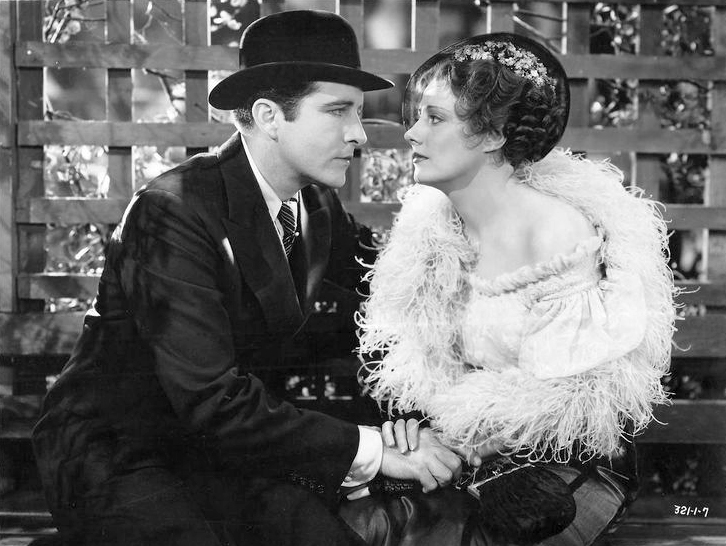
John Boles and Irene Dunne in Back Street

In early 1900s Cincinnati, young and beautiful Ray Schmidt works in her father's shop by day and stays out late drinking beer and dancing with various men by night, although her stepmother disapproves. Ray dates for fun, mostly going out with traveling salesmen passing through town, and neither she nor her dates are interested in any permanent attachment. An exception is Kurt Shendler, who owns a bicycle shop near Mr. Schmidt's shop and aspires to get into the automobile business. Kurt is in love with Ray and asks her to marry him, but she refuses because while she likes Kurt, she doesn't return his romantic feelings.

While visiting the train station with Kurt, Ray meets Walter Saxel and the two fall for each other at first sight. Walter soon confesses to Ray that he is actually engaged to another woman in town, Corinne, who comes from a wealthy background and whose mother is friends with his own mother. Nevertheless, he has fallen in love with Ray, and asks her to meet him at a local band concert that he will be attending with his mother. Walter hopes to introduce Ray to his mother and perhaps get her approval of the relationship. On the day of the concert, Ray is late arriving because her younger half-sister Freda is pregnant and suicidal over her boyfriend, Hugo, leaving town. Freda begs Ray to go after Hugo and stop him, threatening to throw herself out a window if Ray does not help. By the time Ray has dealt with Freda's situation and gotten to the concert, it is over, and Ray cannot find Walter or his mother in the departing crowds. Walter, thinking she stood him up, writes her an angry letter and marries Corinne.

Several years later, Walter, now a rising young financier on Wall Street, runs into Ray who is single and working in New York City. The two renew their acquaintance and realize they still love each other, although Walter is still married and has two children. Walter sets Ray up in an inexpensive apartment and gets her to give up her job so she will be free to see him when he has time. However, his work, family and social commitments sometimes keep him away for long periods of time, causing Ray to feel lonely and isolated. After Walter takes an extended trip to Europe with his wife, leaving Ray alone with insufficient money to live on, she breaks up with him and accepts a proposal from Kurt, who has become a rich automobile manufacturer. Walter goes to Cincinnati to convince her not to marry Kurt and they resume their previous relationship.

Years pass, and Walter has become a wealthy and prominent financier. When he travels he now brings Ray along, although they must keep their relationship hidden and avoid being seen in public together, meaning Ray spends much of her time alone. Ray is the target of gossip and is hated by Walter's adult children, who regard Ray as a gold digger. Walter's son Dick tells Ray to get out of his family's life, but his father Walter walks in on the conversation and tells his son to be more understanding or at least to mind his own business. That night, Walter suffers a massive stroke and dies shortly thereafter. Just before Walter dies, he asks Dick to telephone Ray's number and hears her voice over the phone one last time. Dick, who now understands his father's feelings for Ray, goes to see her and offers to continue to support her. He finds her distraught over Walter's death and also learns that his father had been paying her only a very small amount per month, thus proving that she stayed in the relationship for love, not money. After Dick leaves, Ray dies looking at Walter's picture.

== Cast ==
- Irene Dunne as Ray Schmidt
- John Boles as Walter Saxel
- George Meeker as Kurt Shendler
- ZaSu Pitts as Mrs. Dole
- June Clyde as Freda Schmidt
- William Bakewell as Richard "Dick" Saxel
- Arletta Duncan as Beth Saxel
- Shirley Grey as Francine
- Doris Lloyd as Corinne Saxel
- Paul Weigel as Adolph Schmidt
- Jane Darwell as Mrs. Schmidt
- James Donlan as Phothero
- Walter Catlett as Bakeless
- Robert McWade as Uncle Felix
- Maude Turner Gordon (uncredited) as Mrs. Saxel (Walter's mother)

== Production ==
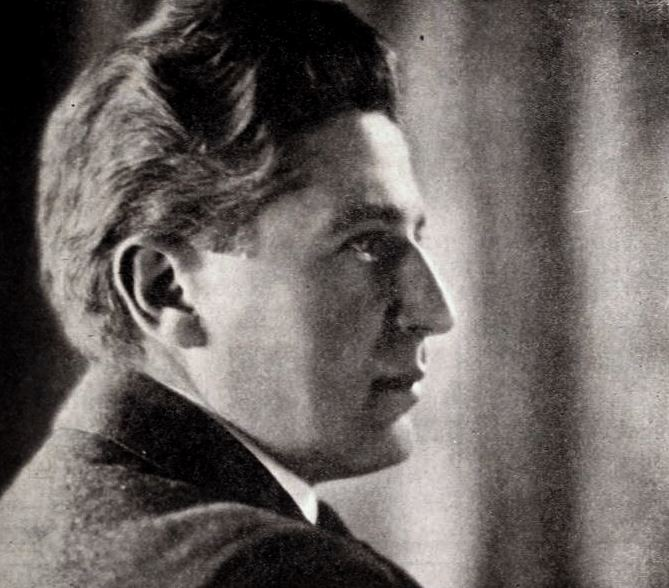
A picture of the director John Stahl

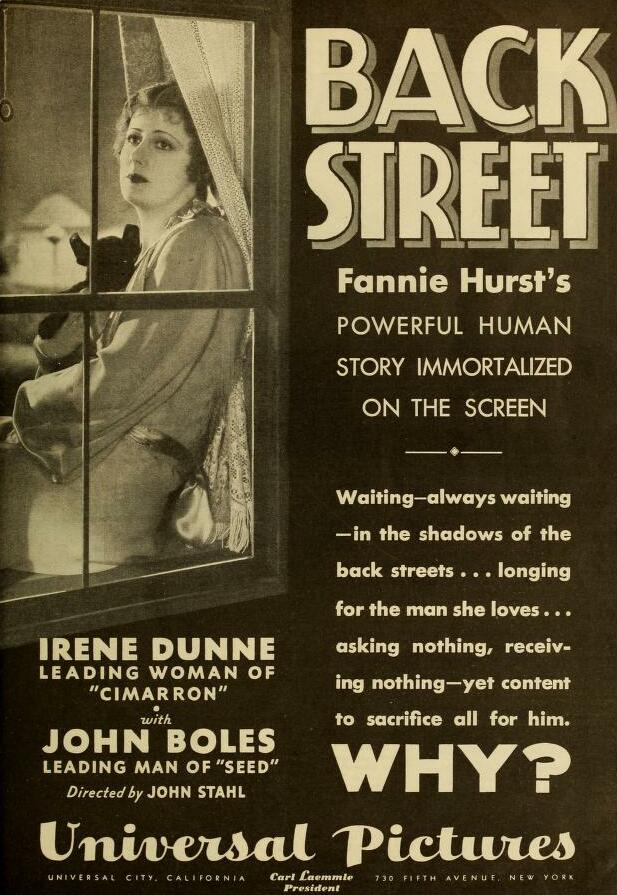
Advertisement from the September 1932 edition of Photoplay

Back Street tells the story of Ray Schmidt in a direct fashion, reflecting the very simple perspective of a woman of her kind in the 1930s. The screenplay writers, Gladys Lehman and Fannie Hurst, wrote the story in straightforward chronological order. Director John M. Stahl had a clear, easily comprehensible directing style, making sure that scenes lasted a long time and including mainly far-shots and relatively few close-up scenes. These techniques increase the effect of objectivity in the film and places its emphasis on the tragic aspects of the story itself rather than on its emotional effect on the characters. In certain shots of the film, Stahl only uses a steady camera set up, and in others he allows major movement of the camera.

The scenes are connected with straight fluency, having strong causal connections between each other. The cinematographer, Karl Freund, incorporated pictorial techniques, such as employment of a moving camera on set or changes in lighting, to make the message of the scene more apparent. Freund pioneered the “Unchained Camera”, which was revolutionary in its time. A new variety and range of shots were offered with this style of shooting. In Back Street there were few moments of movement in scenes, but when there was movement, the camera was shaky. This most likely occurred because the camera was unchained in Freund's technique.

The performances of the actors were restrained. The portrayals of Ray by Irene Dunne and Walter by John Boles are simple and untheatrical, offering a real-life feel. Unlike many films of this era, Back Street does not seem like a filmed stage play, but a slice-of-life that was relatable and revealing of the truth of many women's lives during the bleak period of the Great Depression.
