= Back Street (1941 film) =

1941 film by Robert Stevenson

- Theatrical release poster
- Directed by: Robert Stevenson
- Screenplay by: Bruce Manning; Felix Jackson
- Based on: Back Street by Fannie Hurst
- Produced by: Bruce Manning; Frank Shaw (associate producer)
- Starring: Charles Boyer; Margaret Sullavan; Richard Carlson
- Cinematography: William H. Daniels
- Edited by: Ted J. Kent
- Music by: Frank Skinner
- Production company: Universal Pictures
- Distributed by: Universal Pictures
- Release date: February 7, 1941 (United States)
- Running time: 89 minutes
- Country: United States
- Language: English
- Budget: $675,000

Back Street is a 1941 American drama film directed by Robert Stevenson and starring Charles Boyer, Margaret Sullavan and Richard Carlson. It is a remake of the 1932 film of the same name, also from Universal. The film is adapted from the 1931 Fannie Hurst novel and the 1932 film version which it follows very closely, in some cases recalling the earlier film scene-for-scene. It is a sympathetic tale of an adulterous couple.

The 1941 version was nominated for an Academy Award for Best Music (Score of a Dramatic Picture) (Frank Skinner).

Margaret Sullavan so much wanted Charles Boyer to play her leading man, that she relinquished top billing in order to persuade him to appear in this unsympathetic role.

== Plot ==
The film is set in the early 1900s. It tells the story of a pretty and independent young woman, Ray Smith, who lives in Cincinnati. She has many suitors, none of whom she takes seriously. One day she meets an extremely charming and handsome banker named Walter Louis Saxel, and they fall immediately into a strong attraction, which for her is real love. After a few days of closeness she is shocked when he tells her he is already engaged to someone else. Nonetheless, the two of them very nearly marry one another on an impulse, but they are prevented from doing so by arbitrary external forces.

After five years, they meet once again, by chance, in New York City. The banker is now married with two children (Richard and Elizabeth) and is extremely successful in his career, but Ray and he still share the same strong attraction. Ray loves him so much that she gives up her career in dress design and becomes his mistress, seeing him only when it is convenient for him. Walter keeps up the appearance of a "happy marriage" and never considers divorcing his wife, whose father is his boss at the banking company.

Ray's loyalty to Walter collapses only once, when he fails to contact her after he has been on an extended trip to Europe with his wife. Ray goes back to Ohio and agrees to marry Curt, an attractive and good-hearted man who proposed to her many times in their youth. However, Walter travels to Ohio to find her, and is able to persuade her to return with him.

Once Walter's children reach adulthood they understand who Ray is, and they despise her. People in Walter's social circle also point condemning fingers at Ray, who suffers all this with patience and fortitude.

In old age, dying of a stroke in a hotel in Europe while on a trip with his family, Walter's last faltering word is to Ray, on the phone. After his death, Walter's son goes to see her and give a her ticket for a passage back to America, but when he sees she is sick, he goes for a doctor. She dies while looking at a picture of Walter.

== Cast ==
- Charles Boyer as Walter Louis Saxel
- Margaret Sullavan as Ray Smith
- Richard Carlson as Curt Stanton
- Frank McHugh as Ed Porter
- Tim Holt as Richard Saxel
- Frank Jenks as Harry Niles
- Esther Dale as Mrs. Smith
- Samuel S. Hinds as Felix Darren
- Peggy Stewart as Freda Smith
- Nell O'Day as Elizabeth Saxel
- Kitty O'Neil as Mrs. Dilling
- Nella Walker as Corinne Saxel
- Cecil Cunningham as Mrs. Miller
- Marjorie Gateson as Mrs. Adams
- Dale Winter as Miss Evans
