= Back Street (novel) =

1931 novel by Fannie Hurst

- Author: Fannie Hurst
- Language: English
- Genre: romance novel
- Publication date: 1931
- Publication place: USA

Back Street is a romance novel written by Fannie Hurst in 1931, with underlying themes of death and adultery. The book's copyright was renewed in 1958 for an original 1930 registration and a subsequent 1931 registration, meaning that different editions of the book were published. Each will become public domain in 2026 and 2027 for 1930 and 1931, respectively.

== Film Adaptations ==
It has been filmed five times since its publication:

- In 1932 by director John M. Stahl, starring John Boles and Irene Dunne.
- In 1941 by director Robert Stevenson, starring Charles Boyer and Margaret Sullavan
- In 1948 by director Esther Eng, who changed the story's setting to the Chinese-American community in San Francisco.
- In 1961 by director David Miller, starring Susan Hayward and John Gavin.
- In 1965 by director Mahmoud Zulfikar, starring Salah Zulfikar and Shadia.

The 1932, 1941, and 1961 versions were released by Universal Pictures, and the third was in Technicolor.

All the films—including those where the heroine dies at the end—romanticize the ending. In the book, she dies impoverished.
