= Theodora Cowan =

Australian sculptor (1868–1949)

Theodora Esther Cowan
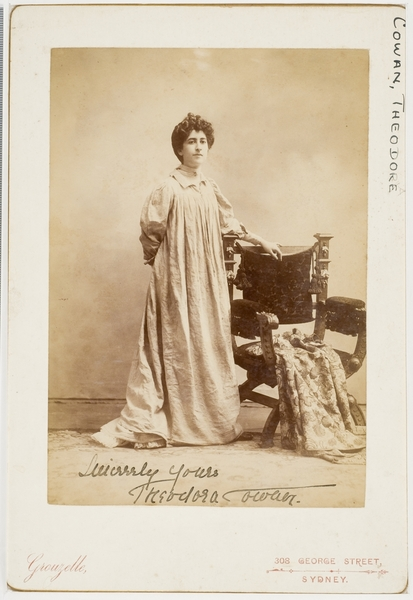
- Cowan c.1898
- Born: 13 November 1868; Sydney, Colony of New South Wales
- Died: 27 August 1949 (aged 80); Vaucluse, New South Wales, Australia
- Education: Sydney Technical College; Accademia di Belle Arti di Firenze
- Known for: Sculpture, painting

Theodora Esther Cowan (Theo) (1868–1949) was an Australian artist, regarded as the first Australian-born woman sculptor. She was one of a number of women sculptors who were working at the end of the 19th century. Apart from being the first to be born in Australia, Cowan (along with Margaret Baskerville) was among the first to achieve success, especially for her portrait work.

== Biography ==
Cowan was born at Richmond Villa in The Domain, Sydney and began her training in Sydney at the Sydney Technical College with Lucien Henry before moving to Italy in 1889 with her parents, where she stayed for six years. She studied in Florence at the Academy of Fine Arts under Longworth Powers and Augusto Rivalta, where she "acquired the technique of her art". Cowan was one of a number of young Australian sculptors, including Bertram Mackennal, who had gone to Europe to study in the early years of the 20th century.

In Italy Cowan met prominent people such as Pietro Mascagni, Ouida and the American sculptor Harriet Hosmer. In 1895, Cowan returned to Sydney and established a studio in the Strand Arcade. She found there was some prejudice against women sculptors and explained that she was "in the position of a pioneer".

Cowan travelled to London in 1901, set up a studio in Grosvenor Street, and met important artists such as Holman Hunt, who visited her. She again returned to Sydney in 1913 and worked from Darlinghurst. In Australia, two of her "best friends" were Lord Hampden, the Governor, and George Reid, the Prime Minister, who Cowan described as "not imbued with this local distrust in women's work".

In 1902, Cowan's name appeared in a list that included Nellie Melba, Ada Crossley, Rosa Campbell Praed, Kathleen Mannington Caffyn, Louise Mack, Mary Gaunt and Ellis Rowan in an illustrated article entitled "Notable Australian Women".

When Cowan died in a private hospital in Vaucluse on 27 August 1949, her address was Osiris 84 Berry Street, North Sydney. The probate value on her estate was £5047.

== Career ==
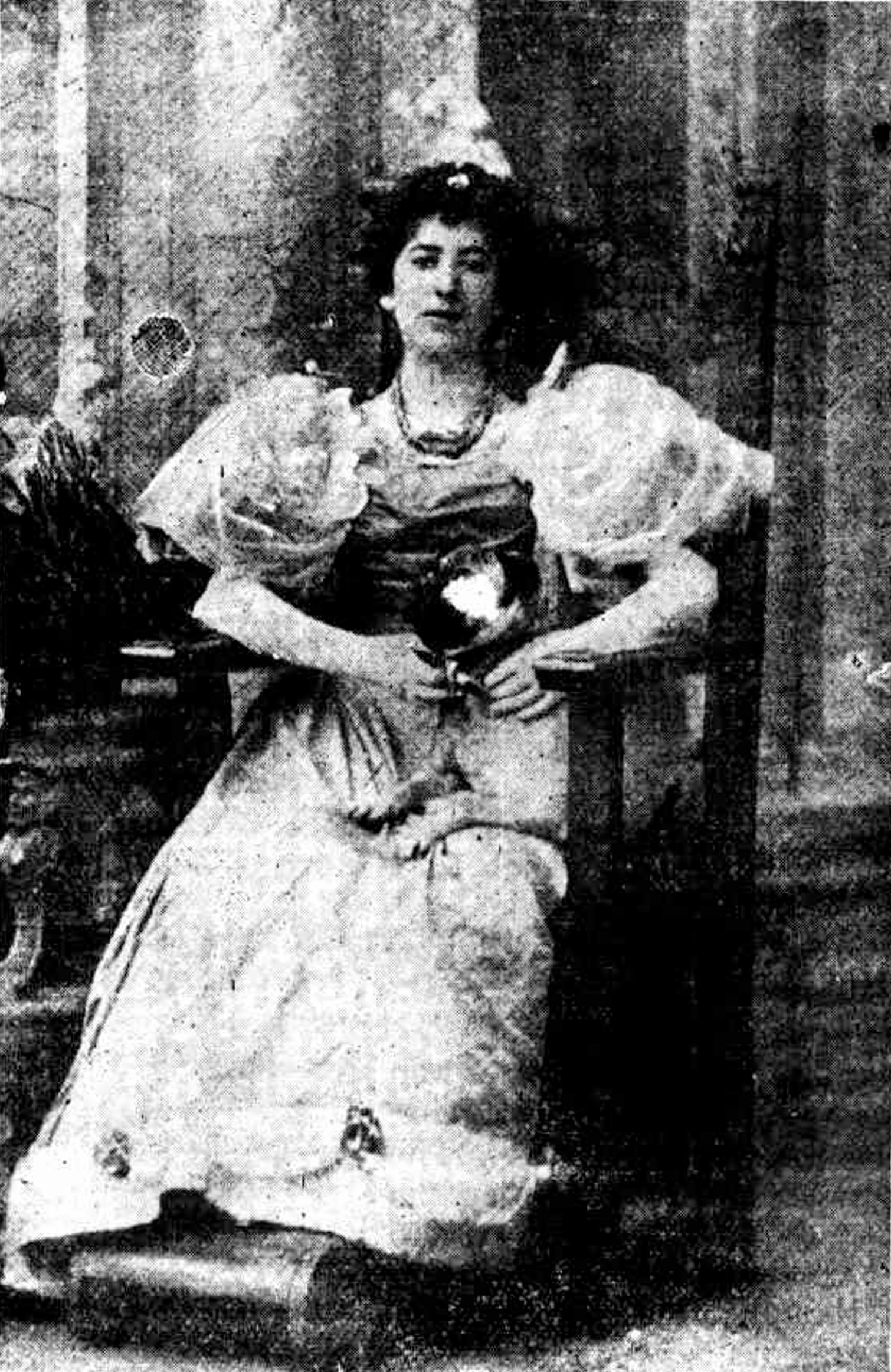
Photograph from The Australasian Hebrew newspaper, 1895

Cowan's first commission was completed in Italy. It was "a monument to Miss Pearson, the Red Cross nurse who founded the first private hospital in London" and was erected in the cemetery of San Miniato al Monte. She was invited to submit a maquette for the proposed sculptural groups to be erected on the Queen Victoria Building but her design of "three draped female figures with coat of arms", a work described as "competent if conventional" was not successful, and the commission was given to William Priestly MacIntosh. In 1897 Cowan was a finalist in the inaugural year of the Wynne Prize and again in 1925. After her return to Sydney in 1913, Cowan worked on commissions for various organisations such as the Government of New South Wales, the Chamber of Manufacturers and a small bust of Dr. Hinder (father of Frank Hinder) for the Western Suburbs Hospital. In Sydney, she was a regular exhibitor at the Society of Artists for which organisation she was a Council member from 1897 to 1898, and an active member of the Society of Women Painters. She became interested in watercolour painting and in later life "turned increasingly towards painting and away from sculpture".

== Works ==
Cowan completed a number of portrait busts of notable people, including the one which took pride of place in her one-woman exhibition at London's Grafton Galleries, that of the Bishop of London, Arthur Winnington-Ingram. The Bishop reportedly sat for it at Fulham Palace. Other well-known, notable subjects included Sir Gilbert Parker, Sir Edmund Barton (first Prime Minister of Australia), Sir Henry Parkes, and a full-length statuette of Mrs. Brown-Potter. Her work is represented in the collections of the Art Gallery of New South Wales and the Parliament House, Canberra.

The bust of Eccleston du Faur (third President of the Board of trustees of the Art Gallery) was the Gallery's first commission to a Sydney artist. "After the completion of the Eccleston du Faur marble bust, there were questions in Parliament as to why the bust had been commissioned and why the commission had been given to a woman."

Her portrait bust of Eliezer Levi Montefiore (President of the Art Gallery Trustees from 1889 to 1892) has been assessed as clearly showing her "skill as a portraitist". It was sculpted in 1898. In 1902 in London she was given a commission for a bust in marble of Egyptologist Flinders Petrie, who was the grandson of explorer Matthew Flinders.

== Awards ==
- 1899 – Society of Artists' Spring Exhibition (showing her bust of Sir Edmund Barton)
- In 1900, she was in London where she held a successful solo exhibition at the Grafton Gallery
- 1907 – London Exhibition of Work by Women Artists (First Prize)
- 1908 – Franco-British Exhibition (gold medal for Will-o-the-Wisp – the best piece of child portraiture)
