= St Anne's Church, Soho =

Coordinates: 51.5124°N 0.1323°W

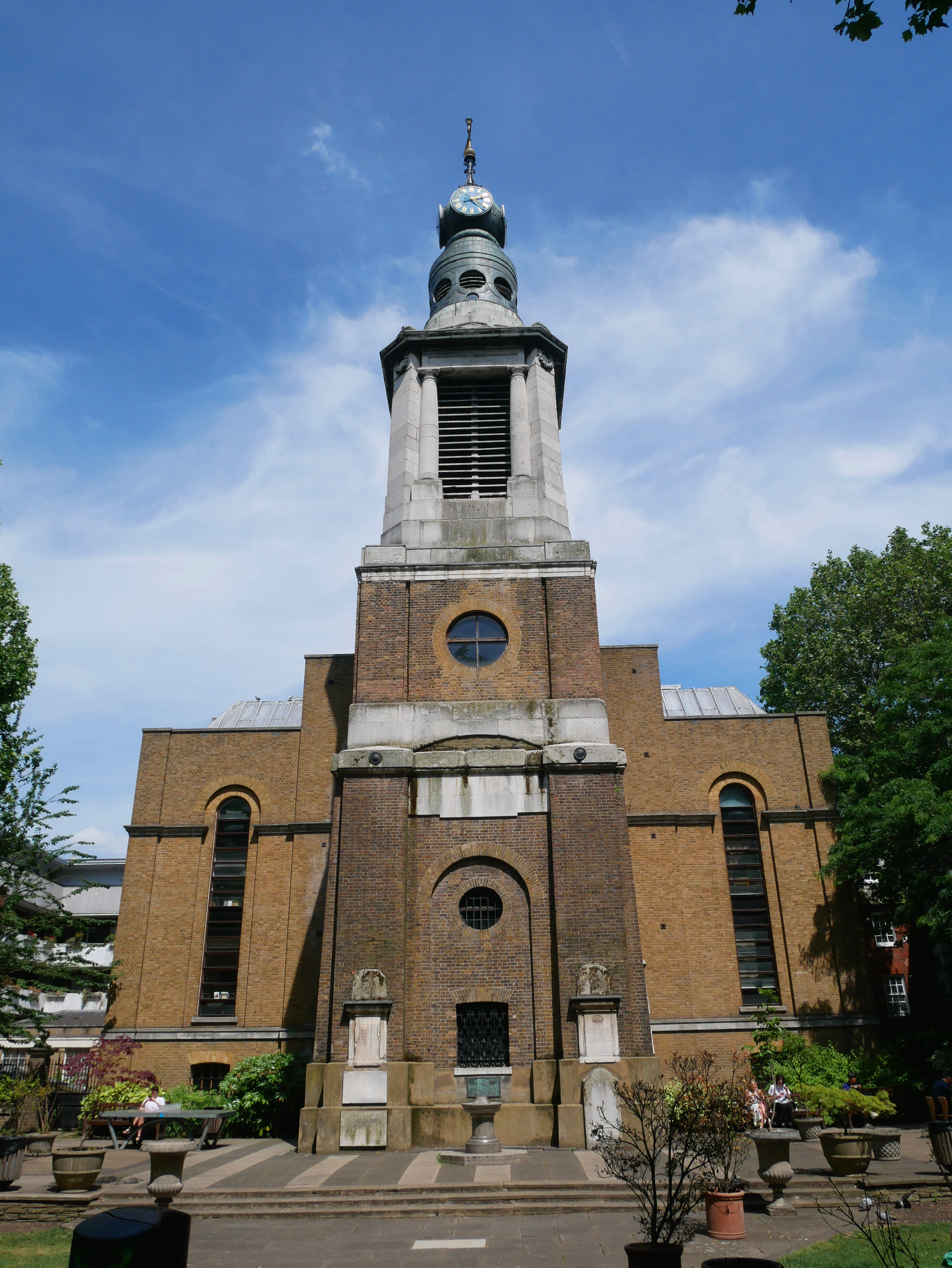
- The tower and west end of St Anne's Church.
- St Anne's Church, Soho
- Location: Soho, London
- Country: England
- Denomination: Church of England

History
- Dedication: Saint Anne
- Dedicated: 1686

Architecture
- Architect: William Talman and/or Christopher Wren
- Years built: 1677–1686

Administration
- Province: Canterbury
- Diocese: London
- Archdeaconry: Charing Cross
- Deanery: Westminster St Margaret
- Parish: St Anne with St Thomas and St Peter, Soho

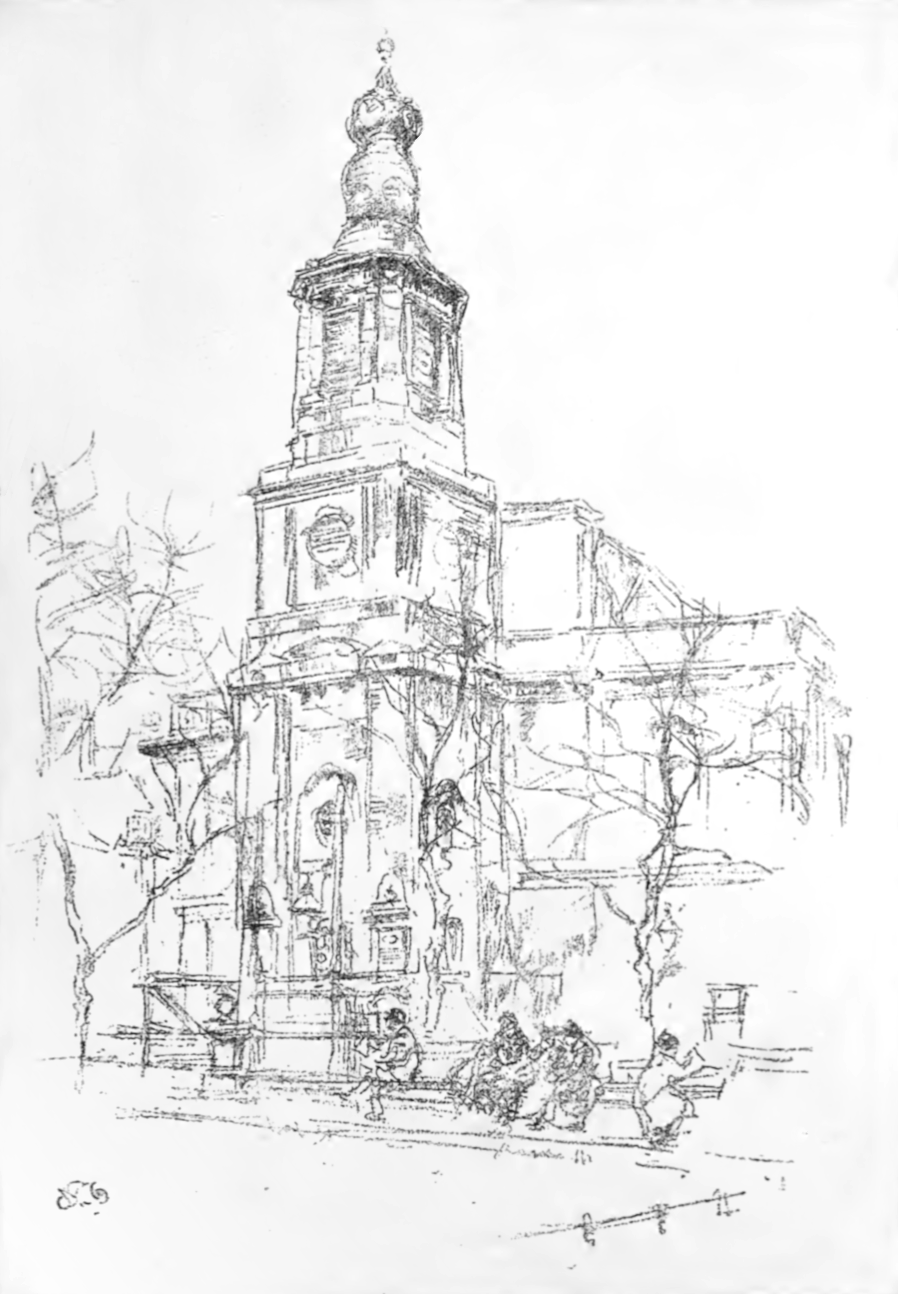
Sketch of St Anne's Church, Soho by James Abbott McNeill Whistler

St Anne's Church serves in the Church of England the Soho section of London. It was consecrated on 21 March 1686 by Bishop Henry Compton as the parish church of the new civil and ecclesiastical parish of St Anne Within the Liberty of Westminster, created from part of the parish of St Martin in the Fields. The church is under the Deanery of Westminster (St Margaret) in the Diocese of London.

Parts of its churchyard around its west including tower are now the public park of St Anne's Gardens, accessed from the Shaftesbury Avenue end of Wardour Street. The church is accessed via a gate at that end of Dean Street.

The parish, having spawned two new churches dedicated to Saints Thomas and Peter, reconsolidated on St Anne's in 1945.

== History ==
=== 1677–1799 ===
Creation of St. Anne's Parish, Westminster Act 1678
- Act of Parliament
- Parliament of England
- Long title: An Act for making Part of the Parish of St. Martin's in the Feilds a new Parish, to be called The Parish of St. Anne within the Liberty of Westminster.
- Citation: 30 Cha. 2. c. 16 Pr.
- Territorial extent: England and Wales

Dates
- Royal assent: 15 July 1678
- Commencement: 23 May 1678 (Note: Start of session.)
- Repealed: 2 June 1965

Other legislation
- Repealed by: Saint Anne, Soho Act 1965
- Relates to: St. Anne's Parish, Westminster Act 1685

Status: Repealed

St. Anne's Parish, Westminster Act 1685
- Act of Parliament
- Parliament of England
- Long title: An Act to enable the Inhabitants of the Parish of St. Anne, within the Liberty of Westm. to raise Money, to build a Church, to be a Parish Church there.
- Citation: 1 Ja. 2. c. 1 Pr.
- Territorial extent: England and Wales

Dates
- Royal assent: 2 July 1685
- Repealed: 2 June 1965

Other legislation
- Repealed by: Saint Anne, Soho Act 1965
- Relates to: Creation of St. Anne's Parish, Westminster Act 1678; St. James' Parish, Westminster Act 1685

Status: Repealed

The parish was dedicated to Saint Anne because Compton had been tutor to Princess Anne before she became Queen. Construction commenced in 1677 on a plot in what was then the countryside of Soho Fields, with William Talman and/or Christopher Wren as architects. The church was designed as an 80 feet (24 m) long and 64 feet (20 m) wide basilican church, with a 70 feet (21 m) high west end tower.

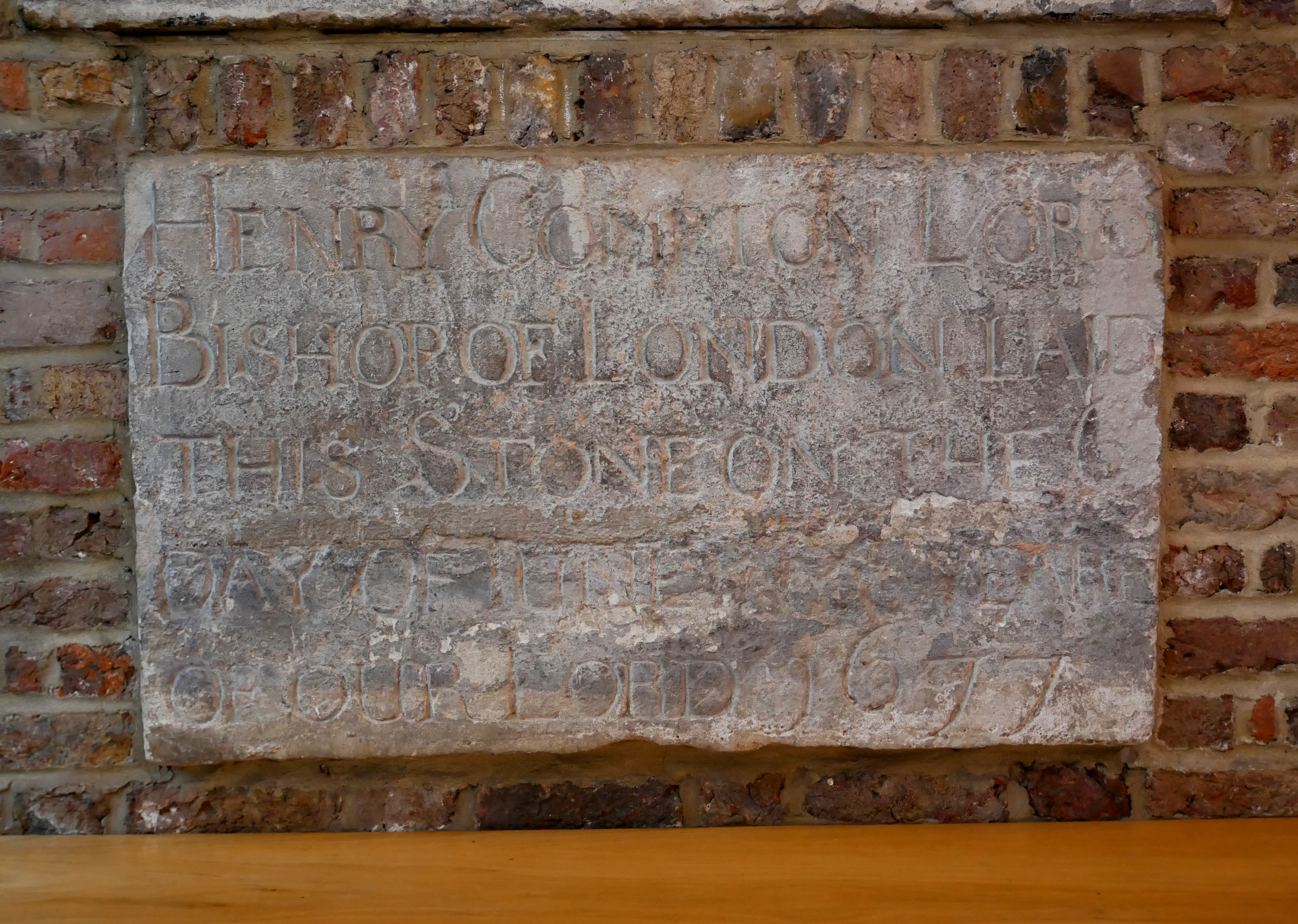
Foundation plaque inside the church, dated 1677

In 1699 a tuition-free parish school was founded for boys and in 1704 it started to admit girls. The church received an organ in 1699 from the Dowager-Queen's Chapel in St James's Palace and from 1700 the church's first organist was William Croft (composer of the "St Anne" tune to O God, Our Help in Ages Past). That organ (which was by Father Bernard Smith) was removed in 1798 and installed in St Michael Paternoster Royal. The church's tower was only completed in 1718, with the addition of a timber spire by local carpenter John Meard. Edmund Andros was buried in the church's churchyard in 1714 as was the actress Hester Davenport in 1717, while in 1724/5 the church saw the marriage of Edward Harley, 3rd Earl of Oxford and Earl Mortimer, and in 1743 Prince William Henry (younger brother of George III) was baptised here. The actress and dancer Arabella Menage was baptised here in 1782.

=== 1800–1939 ===
Parish Church of St. Anne, Westminster Act 1802
- Act of Parliament
- Parliament of the United Kingdom
- Long title: An Act for completing the rebuilding of the Tower of the Parish Church of Saint Anne, within the Liberty of Westminster in the County of Middlesex, and a new Vestry Room, Watch House, Engine House, and Vaults, for the Use of the said Parish; and for repairing the said Church, improving the Church Yard, and making certain Regulations relating to the said Parish.
- Citation: 42 Geo. 3. c. lxxii

Dates
- Royal assent: 28 May 1802

Other legislation
- Repealed by: St. Anne, Soho Act 1965

Status: Repealed

The tower, however, became unstable by 1800 and, after 41 meetings of a "Tower Rebuilding Committee" came no closer to solving the problem, the architect Samuel Pepys Cockerell was commissioned to design a replacement. The original tower was demolished (though the 1 ton clock bell, cast in 1691 and still in use, was retained) and the new tower's brickwork was completed by 1801, its bell chamber's Portland stonework by March 1803, and its copper cupola by May 1803. The new tower's ground floor room became the parish's vestry room, and later (in the 20th century) a robing room for the clergy, and in the 14 feet (4.3 m) deep brick chamber beneath it are interred the ashes of the novelist Dorothy L Sayers, who was a longtime Churchwarden of the parish and member of the St Anne's Society. 19th-century burials in the churchyard included David Williams (1816) and William Hazlitt (1830). Also placed in the crypt was the body of Thomas Pitt, 2nd Baron Camelford in 1804.

The church's choir and music, famous since its consecration, continued with Sir Joseph Barnby (later Precentor of Eton), who served as its organist from 1871 to 1888 and introduced the first UK performance of Bach's "Saint John Passion", and with royal command performances (in 1886 for Queen Victoria at Windsor, singing Louis Spohr's "Last Judgement"; and later, at Buckingham Palace, for Queen Alexandra). The first religious service with music broadcast by radio came from this church in the 1920s.

=== 1939–present ===
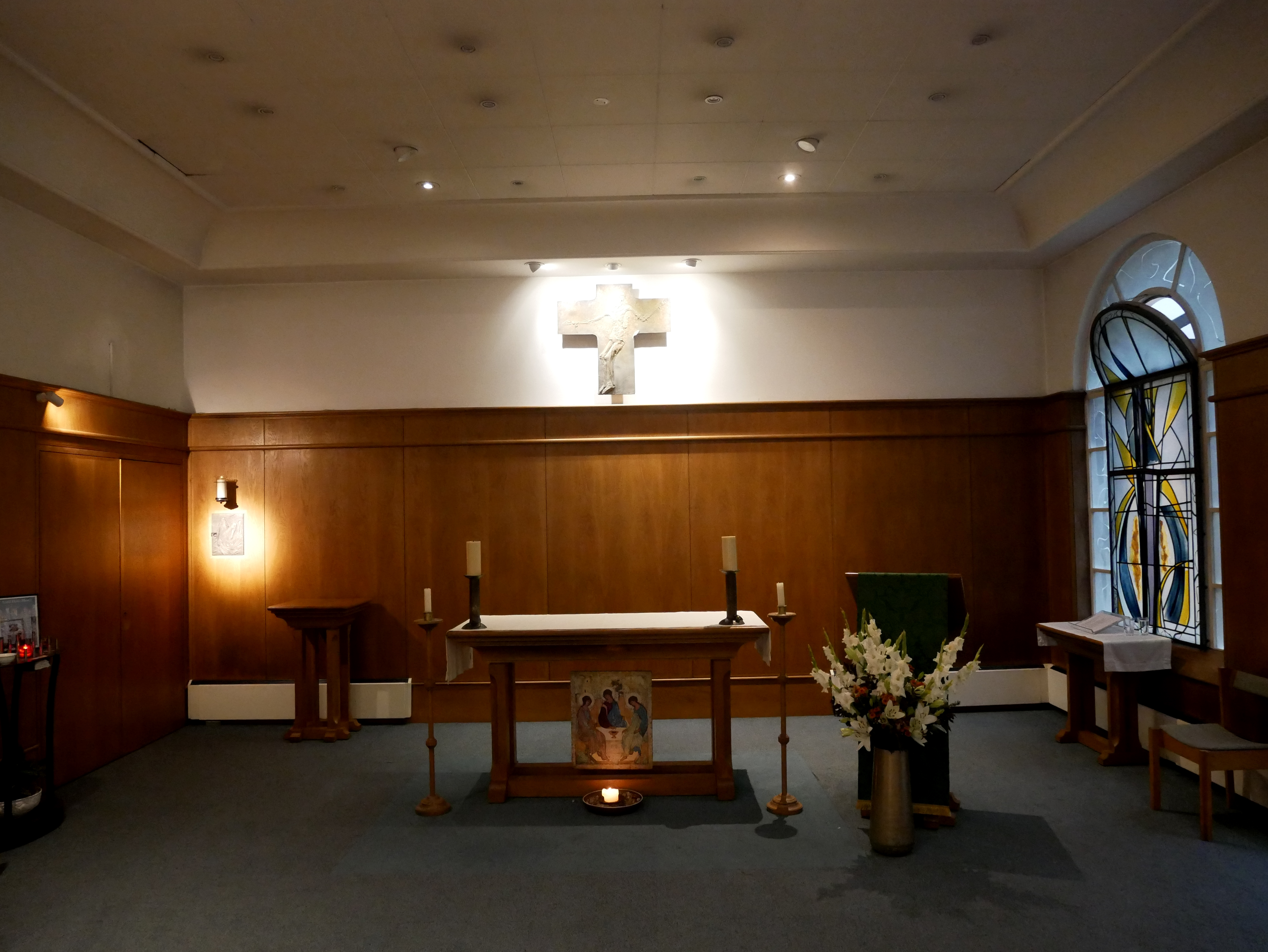
The contemporary chapel inside the church

The whole church was left burned out on the night of 24 September 1940 during the Blitz, apart from the tower, which was left derelict. St Thomas's Regent Street (now demolished) and the adjoining St Anne's House in the "Upper Room" (now known as the "Allen Room") were used for worship from then on. Though Jacques Groag in 1945 proposed keeping the ruins as a war memorial, it was by 1949 assumed that the church would not be rebuilt, so in 1953 the remains of the east wall (the only significant parts left standing) were demolished, the site deconsecrated and prepared for sale, and the parish amalgamated with those of the churches of St Thomas's Church, Regent Street and St Peter's Church, Great Windmill Street (creating the Parish of St Anne with St Thomas and St Peter, centred on St Thomas's).

Saint Anne, Soho Act 1965
- Act of Parliament
- Parliament of the United Kingdom
- Long title: An Act to provide for the erection by the London Diocesan Fund of a new church on part of the site of the former church of Saint Anne, Soho, and the burial ground appurtenant thereto; to authorise the use for other purposes of the said site and lands; and for purposes incidental thereto.
- Citation: 1965 c. v

Dates
- Royal assent: 2 June 1965

Other legislation
- Repeals/revokes: Creation of St. Anne's Parish, Westminster Act 1678 (30 Cha. 2. c. 16); St. Anne's Parish, Westminster Act 1685 (1 Ja. 2. c. 1); Parish Church of St. Anne, Westminster Act 1802 (42 Geo. 3. c. lxxii)

Status: Current legislation

Text of statute as originally enacted

The tower was used as a chapel for a time in the 1950s, partly restored in 1979 by the Soho Society, and fully restored in the 1990–91 rebuilding of the whole church – the tower is now a Grade II* listed building. That reconstruction had been the result of London County Council's policy to keep Soho as a residential area, was facilitated by a new local act of Parliament, the Saint Anne, Soho Act 1965 (c. v), allowing the site to be cleared and began in earnest with a foundation stone laid by Princess Anne on 12 March 1990. The new complex was completed in time for an opening and rededication on St Anne's Day, 26 July 1991. The new church and its associated complex is not per se a reconstruction of the old and can be varied from a large to a small space. It is set within a community centre and is a community focus such as for grief surrounding the 1999 Admiral Duncan pub bombing.

Despite the lack of a building at that time, from 1941 to 1958 the St Anne Society under Father Patrick McLaughlin encouraged links between the literary world and the Church of England, with members such as Fr Gilbert Shaw, J. C. Winnington-Ingram, Charles Williams, Agatha Christie, T. S. Eliot, Fr Max Petitpierre, Dom Gregory Dix, Arnold Bennett, C. S. Lewis, Dorothy Sayers, and the churchwarden Rose Macaulay. Continuing the work of the church's 18th- and 19th-century philanthropic rectors, in the 20th and 21st centuries the "Vestry of St Anne's" (now called the Parochial Church Council) has been active in social work with London's poor and homeless (Kenneth Leech founded the charity Centrepoint in St Anne's House's basement in December 1969 whilst he was assistant priest at St Anne's and it remained based at the church until 2023). The Church is currently thriving as a church community and as venue for many local community and charitable events and meetings; it also houses the Soho Society, anti-homophobic bullying charity Diversity Role Models and since January 2024 its own community coffee shop Sacred Grounds. To celebrate the 25th anniversary of the rebuilding of the church a redesigned entrance on Dean Street was unrevealed on 8 December 2016.

The new entrance by UAL London students Lina Viluma and Sherief al Rifa’i who were chosen, as a result of a competition to redesign the entrance of St Anne's. Winning the President's Award for alterations to a church building in the 2017 Church Architecture Awards, the judges said that "The design has a strong idea but has been carefully refined employing subtle geometries in the ceiling and joinery. These elements have been combined with a striking lighting scheme to make a dynamic and inviting entrance to the church."

== Rectors of St Anne's Church, Soho ==
- 1686–1704 † John Hearne
- 1704–1750 † John Pelling
- 1750–1766 † Samuel Squire (as Dean of Bristol from 1760, Bishop of St David's from 1761)
- 1766–1778 Richard Hind
- 1778–1781 † Robert Richardson
- 1781–1806 † Stephen Eaton (as Archdeacon of Middlesex)
- 1806–1845 † Roderick MacLeod
- 1846–1891 Nugent Wade
- 1891–1914 John Henry Cardwell
- 1914–1929 † George Clement Wilton
- 1930–1933 Basil Bourchier (resigned after mountaineering accident or due to scandal)
- ——
- 1953–1962 Patrick McLaughlin
- 1963–1975 John Frear Hester
- 1978–1984 Michael Barnabas St Leger Hurst-Bannister
- 1985–1998 Frederick Crichton Stevens
- 1998–2007 Clare Marguerite Herbert
- 2007–2011 David Samuel Gilmore (sacked for unbecoming conduct)
- 2011–2013 William Mungo Jacob
- 2013– Richard Simon Fildes Buckley

† Rector died in post

== See also ==
- List of Christopher Wren churches in London
