= Patrick McLaughlin (churchman) =

English churchman and writer

- Born: 1909; Much Birch, Herefordshire, United Kingdom
- Died: 1988 (aged 78–79); London, United Kingdom
- Education: Bromsgrove School
- Alma mater: Worcester College, Oxford
- Spouse: Olive Marion McConnell

Ecclesiastical career
- Church: Roman Catholic Church (1962–); Church of England (1909–1962)
- Writings: The Necessity of Worship; The Death of God

Patrick McLaughlin (1909–1988) was an English Roman Catholic lay brother of the Order of Saint Benedict and a Christian writer, as well as a former Anglican priest until he became a Roman Catholic in 1962. While an Anglican priest, he was known in the Anglo-Catholic manner as Father Patrick McLaughlin.

== Early life and background ==
The son of the Reverend Alfred Harry McLaughlin (1852–1935) and his second wife, Jessie Mabel Vale (called May), McLaughlin was born in 1909 while his father was vicar of Much Birch, Herefordshire.

=== Family background ===
McLaughlin's mother was the daughter of the Reverend John Bartholomew Vale (1823–1896), Rector of Crostwight, Norfolk, and of his wife Clara (1836–1919). His father retired to Malvern in 1913.

The only child of his parents' marriage, McLaughlin had two older half-sisters, Owyne Salwey McLaughlin (1885–1972) and Margaret Joy Crofton McLaughlin (1887–1972). Their sister, Cecil Urwick McLaughlin, born in 1880, had died in 1896.

McLaughlin's paternal grandparents were the Very Reverend Hubert McLaughlin (1805–1882) and Frederica Crofton (1816–1881), a daughter of Sir Edward Crofton, 3rd Baronet, and of Lady Charlotte Stewart (1785–1842), the youngest of the five daughters of John Stewart, 7th Earl of Galloway. Hubert McLaughlin was Rector of Burford, Shropshire, a rural dean and the Prebendary of Hunderton at Hereford Cathedral. He was the author of Biographical Sketches of Ancient Irish Saints, etc. (1874). Hubert and Frederica Crofton had no fewer than eight sons and four daughters. Of their sons, one became a major general, one a judge, one agent to the Earl of Feversham, and two (including Patrick McLaughlin's father Alfred) clergymen of the Church of England, while Patrick McLaughlin's aunts included the nurses Louisa Elisabeth McLaughlin and Sophia Charlotte McLaughlin.

One of McLaughlin's first cousins was a namesake who became Rear-Admiral Patrick McLaughlin CB DSO RN. In 1945, as vice-admiral commanding the 4th Cruiser Squadron of the British Pacific Fleet, he took the surrender of the Japanese forces in Hong Kong.

=== Education ===
McLaughlin was educated at Bromsgrove School and then at Worcester College, Oxford. While at Oxford he was an active member of the Oxford University Dramatic Society and as a fresh-faced young man he was often cast in female roles. However, he resisted the possibility of becoming an actor at a time when acting was not seen as an altogether respectable profession.

=== Marriage and descendants ===
In 1932, McLaughlin married Olive Marion McConnell (1906–73), a daughter of William Haydn McConnell, organist and music teacher. His wife was herself an Associate of the Royal College of Music who played the piano, the oboe and the viola. Together, they had three sons and two daughters. These were:

1. Julian Aubyn Crofton McLaughlin (born 1933, a time and motion consultant, who married Sheila Gilford in 1958, had four children, Anthony, David, Gillian and Nicholas, and died in 1968).<
2. Brigid Joy McLaughlin (born 1935, married Peter Crosby Smith in 1965, was divorced in 1974, and married secondly Howard Reeve, 1981)
3. Diarmid Patrick Vale McLaughlin (born 1937, a director of the European Commission, married Monica Voisin in 1964, was divorced in 2002, and has one child, Guillaume McLaughlin, born 1968)
4. Roger O'Brien McLaughlin (born 1939, a financial advisor, who married Leigh Bateson in 1965, had three children, Crofton, Shauna, and Patrick, and died in 1994)
5. Juliet Marie-Therese McLaughlin (born 1940, married David Oswald in 1961, died 26 July 2008, and had four children, Zandra, Peter, James and Duncan)

== Career ==
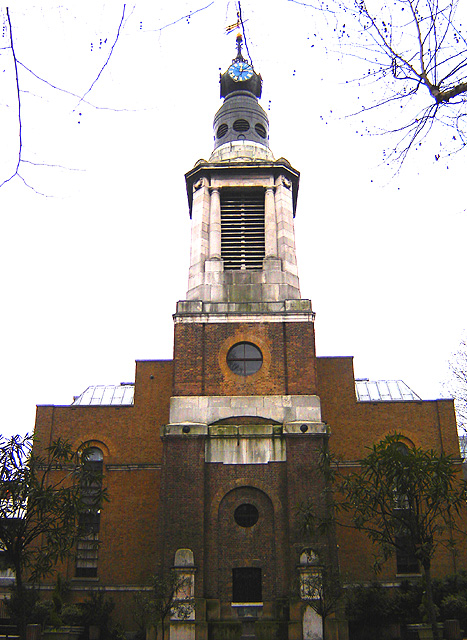
St Anne's Church, Soho

Deciding to follow his father and grandfather into the priesthood of the Church of England, McLaughlin was ordained as a deacon and a priest and quickly took to elaborate Anglo-Catholic ritual.

As vicar of St Thomas's, Regent Street, London (a church now closed), he brought theatre into his church by staging plays by (among others) Christopher Fry and Ronald Duncan, until he was asked by the Lord Chamberlain's Office to desist. He was also Warden of St Anne's House, Soho, in a West End sister parish of St Thomas's, a part of London famous for its night life and entertainments. At St Anne's, Soho, McLaughlin sponsored a Musicolour dance performance designed by Gordon Pask.

In Soho, McLaughlin and the vicar of St Anne's, Father Gilbert Shaw, founded, and McLaughlin directed, the Society of St Anne's, which was active between 1942 and 1958 and which promoted links between the Church and the world of literature. The society was begun late in 1942 when McLaughlin and Shaw asked the Bishop of London (Geoffrey Fisher, later Archbishop of Canterbury) for permission to use the St Anne's clergy house as a kind of mission centre for thinking pagans. Fisher agreed, and Dorothy L. Sayers was asked to give the new society's first course of lectures, then T. S. Eliot the second. The location of St Anne's, near to the theatres, colleges and restaurants around Bloomsbury and also to the Inns of Court, was ideal for such an intellectual outreach programme, and the Society soon included C. S. Lewis, Agatha Christie, Charles Williams, Arnold Bennett and Rose Macaulay, as well as T. S. Eliot and Dorothy L. Sayers, among its members. Others who contributed to it from time to time included John Betjeman, Iris Murdoch, Lord David Cecil, Rebecca West and Christopher Dawson.

When Sayers died in 1958, McLaughlin conducted the burial of her ashes under the tower of St Anne's Church.

With Father Gilbert Shaw, McLaughlin is thought to be part of the inspiration for the character of Father Hugh Chantry-Pigg in Rose Macaulay's novel The Towers of Trebizond (1956). Macaulay described McLaughlin as a "many-sided kind of priest, whom I like".

McLaughlin introduced into England the 'Basilican mode', in which the priest, while at the altar, faces the congregation with his back to the altar, instead of facing the altar with his back to the congregation. This liturgical innovation was widely adopted in the Church of England some twenty years later. However, he found the Church of England and the then Bishop of London, Robert Stopford increasingly hard to live with, and in 1962 McLaughlin resigned his Anglican orders. He subsequently went to live in Rome, taking a job as a translator for the Food and Agriculture Organization of the United Nations.

It was while in Rome that he joined the Roman Catholic Church. He subsequently became a lay brother of the Order of St Benedict.

Returning in his last years to London, McLaughlin became a Brother of Charterhouse at Sutton's Hospital when he was not travelling the world. When he died in 1988, he was buried with his wife in a graveyard belonging to Charterhouse at St Mary's, Little Hallingbury, Essex.

== Works ==
McLaughlin's book The Necessity of Worship (1940) shows him as an ecumenist decades before ecumenism became fashionable. He also published The Death of God (1949).

== Distinctions ==
- Knight of the Patriarchal Order of the Holy Cross of Jerusalem of the Melkite Greek Catholic Church
