= Trebizond (disambiguation) =

Trebizond is the former name of a city in Turkey now known as Trabzon.

Trebizond may also refer to:

- Empire of Trebizond (1204–1461), a successor state to the Eastern Roman Empire
- Trebizond Eyalet (1598–1867), a province of the Ottoman Empire
- Trebizond vilayet (1867–1923), a province of the Ottoman Empire

== See also ==
- The Towers of Trebizond, a 1956 novel by Rose Macaulay
