= St Peter's Church, Great Windmill Street =

Former church in Soho, London

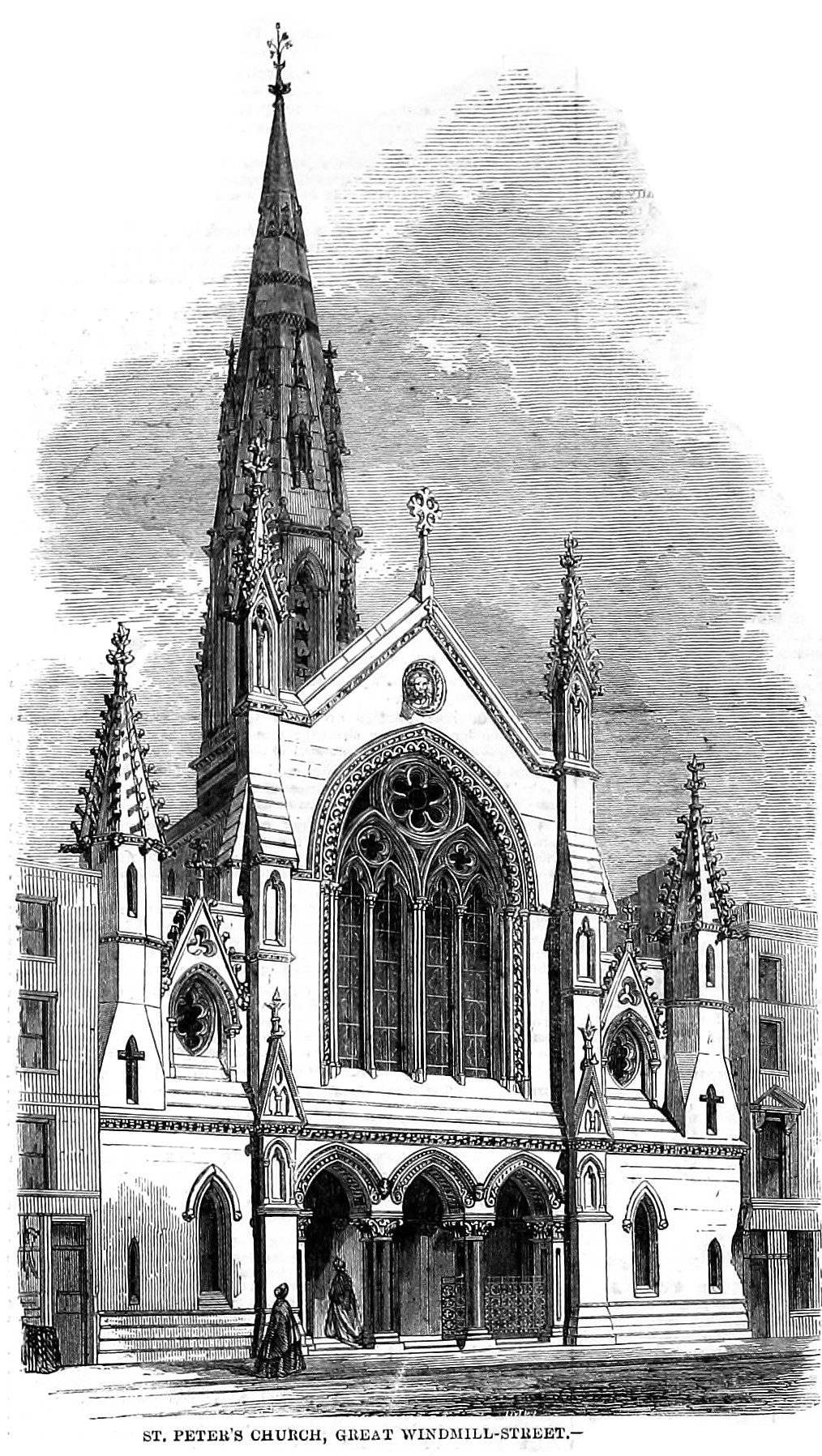
St Peter's Church. The Illustrated London News, 20 July 1861.

St Peter's Church was an Anglican church in Great Windmill Street in Soho, in the City of Westminster, London. It was built in 1861, and was demolished in the 1950s.

== History ==
The church was designed by Raphael Brandon, for a small site on the east side of Great Windmill Street, externally only the west front being seen by the public. Since it was a poor district, funds for the site and for the building came from elsewhere, and the largest single contributor was the 14th Earl of Derby. The foundation stone was laid by the Earl of Derby on the 25 June 1860, and the completed church was consecrated on 12 July 1861. Lavers and Barraud provided glass for the east windows of the aisles. A district was assigned to the church on 7 February 1865.

Incumbents included George Wilkinson (later Bishop of Truro and Bishop of St Andrews) from 1867 to 1869, Arthur Mozley from 1869 to 1880, and Henry Alsager Sheringham from 1880 to 1885. The church was often attended by Lord Salisbury.

The building measured 100 by 50 feet (30 by 15 m): it was built of brick and faced inside and out with Bath stone. It had a nave and aisles, with clerestory above, and a short apsidal chancel.

In 1953, a new parish was created, uniting the parishes of St Peter's Church, St Thomas's Church in Regent Street and St Anne's Church, Soho. St Peter's was closed in April 1954, and was demolished.
