= St Anne's Churchyard =

Park and former churchyard in Soho, London

- Interactive map of St Anne's Churchyard
- Location: Wardour Street, Soho
- Coordinates: 51.5124°N 0.1323°W
- Operator: Westminster City Council
- Open: All year

St Anne's Churchyard, also known as St Anne's Gardens, is a public park on Wardour Street in Soho, Westminster. Formerly the churchyard of St Anne's, Soho, it was closed to burials in 1853 under the Burial Act 1852.

It is believed that up to 60,000 bodies remain buried there. This explains why the ground is so high above the entrance on Wardour Street.

It was laid out as a garden by the landscape gardener Fanny Wilkinson on behalf of the Metropolitan Public Gardens Association in 1891. It was opened to the public by Lady Hobhouse on 27 June 1892. The London plane trees remain a notable feature of the garden. It is managed by Westminster City Council and has received the Green Flag Award.

War memorials to WWI and WWII are located in the churchyard on the wall of the church tower. The WWII memorial was only installed in 2012. There are a small number of memorials remaining within the churchyard, including the essayist William Hazlitt, whose gravestone was restored in 2003.

The gardens contain a memorial to the victims of the 1999 Admiral Duncan pub bombing. There are three art installations, all of which serve practical purposes: "Wall of Light" (an illuminated security fence), "Art Loo" (a WC with art displays) and "Table" (a monumentally-sized picnic table).
