= The Towers of Trebizond =

1956 novel by Rose Macaulay

- First edition
- Author: Rose Macaulay
- Language: English
- Genre: Autobiographical novel
- Publisher: Collins
- Publication date: 1956
- Publication place: United Kingdom
- Media type: Print (hardback & paperback)
- Preceded by: The World My Wilderness (1950)

The Towers of Trebizond is a novel by Rose Macaulay (1881–1958). Published in 1956, it was the last of her novels, and the most successful. It was awarded the James Tait Black Memorial Prize for fiction in the year of its publication.

== Plot ==
The book is partly autobiographical. It follows the adventures of a group of people – the narrator Laurie, the eccentric Dorothea ffoulkes-Corbett (otherwise Aunt Dot), her High Anglican clergyman friend Father Hugh Chantry-Pigg (who keeps his collection of sacred relics in his pockets) – travelling from Istanbul (or Constantinople as Fr. Chantry-Pigg would have it, or Byzantium as Laurie would have it) to Trebizond. A Turkish feminist doctor attracted to Anglicanism acts as a foil to the main characters.

On the way, they meet magicians, Turkish policemen and juvenile British travel-writers, and observe the BBC and Billy Graham on tour. Aunt Dot proposes to emancipate the women of Turkey by converting them to Anglicanism and popularising the bathing hat, while Laurie has more worldly preoccupations. Historical references (British Christianity since the Dissolution of the Monasteries, nineteenth-century travellers to the Ottoman Empire, the First World War, the Fourth Crusade, St. Paul's third missionary journey, Troy) abound.

The geographical canvas is enlarged with the two senior characters eloping to the Soviet Union and the heroine meeting her lover in Turkey, and then her semi-estranged mother in Jerusalem. The final chapters raise multiple issues such as the souls of animals, and culminate in a fatal accident and its aftermath.

At another level the book, against its Anglo-Catholic backdrop, deals with the conflict between Laurie's attraction to Christianity and her adulterous love for a married man. This was a problem Macaulay had faced in her own life, having had an affair with the married novelist and former Roman Catholic priest Gerald O'Donovan (1871–1942) from 1920 until his death.

The book's opening sentence is,

"Take my camel, dear", said my Aunt Dot, as she climbed down from this animal on her return from High Mass.

The Turkish doctor says of Aunt Dot, "She is a woman of dreams. Mad dreams, dreams of crazy, impossible things. And they aren't all of conversion to the Church, oh no. Nor all of the liberation of women, oh no. Her eyes are on far mountains, always some far peak where she will go. She looks so firm and practical, that nice face, so fair and plump and shrewd, but look in her eyes, you will sometimes catch a strange gleam."

Barbara Reynolds has suggested that the character of Aunt Dot is based on Rose Macaulay's friend Dorothy L. Sayers, and that Father Hugh Chantry-Pigg has elements of Frs. Patrick McLaughlin, Gilbert Shaw and Gerard Irvine.

The book was described in The New York Times: "Fantasy, farce, high comedy, lively travel material, delicious japes at many aspects of the frenzied modern world, and a succession of illuminating thoughts about love, sex, life, organized churches and religion are all tossed together with enchanting results."

== Editions ==
- The first UK edition was published by Collins of London in 1956.
- The first US edition (under the same title) was published by Farrar, Straus, of New York, in 1957, with a new edition by Farrar Straus & Giroux in 1980.
- A de luxe edition from the Folio Society, of London, with an introduction by Joanna Trollope, appeared in 2005 and is still in print.
- A UK paperback version is also still in print, published by Flamingo.
- An edition was published by The New York Review of Books in 2003 with an introduction by Jan Morris.
