= They Were Defeated =

1932 novel by Rose Macaulay

- First edition
- Author: Rose Macaulay
- Language: English
- Genre: Historical fiction
- Set in: 1640s
- Publisher: Collins
- Publication date: 1932
- Publication place: United Kingdom
- Media type: Hardcover
- Pages: 382 pp
- OCLC: 223143700

They Were Defeated is a historical novel by Rose Macaulay, first published in 1932. It was published in the USA under the title The Shadow Flies. It was through the publication of the American edition that Macaulay got back in touch with her cousin, the Rev. John Hamilton Cowper Johnson, and thus began a correspondence that lasted until her death. The historian C V Wedgwood wrote the preface to a 1960 edition of the book, in which she reveals that the novel was written partly at the instigation of Macaulay's publisher, John Murray, who had asked for something to shed light on the background to her first novel, Abbots Verney (1906).

They Were Defeated is set in the 17th century, and the poets Robert Herrick, Sir John Suckling and John Cleveland are major characters. Other real historical characters who feature prominently are Abraham Cowley, Andrew Marvell and Henry More.

== Plot ==
The first part of the novel is set in Devon, where Dr Conybeare, a progressive-minded physician, resides in the parish of Rev. Robert Herrick. The widowed doctor lives alone with the youngest of his four children, his fifteen-year-old daughter Julian. Conybeare himself is an atheist, but the studious Julian attends church with her friend Meg Yarde, granddaughter of the local squire. Meg's brother Giles is a student at the University of Cambridge, along with Julian's brother Kit. Dr Conybeare deplores the lack of educational opportunities for women, and has Julian privately tutored in the classics by Herrick, who also instils in her a love for literature, particularly poetry. When an elderly local woman is accused of witchcraft, Conybeare and his daughter hide her in their home, but she is discovered and sentenced to be burned at the stake. The doctor administers a fast-acting poison to save her from suffering, and thus incurs the anger of the local population.

Deciding to take Julian away from the hostile atmosphere of the village, Dr Conybeare arranges a visit to his son in Cambridge, and a party is made up, consisting of the Conybeares, Herrick and Meg Yarde. The second part of the novel takes place mainly in Cambridge, where Julian is thrilled to find herself in the company of many prominent poets and philosophers, and begins attending classes given by Henry More to selected young ladies. She is largely unaware of the political upheavals that threaten to escalate into war, but is concerned when her brother Kit converts to Catholicism without their father's knowledge. She also falls in love with Kit's urbane tutor, John Cleveland, even though Cleveland has no sympathy with the idea of female education and belittles Julian's interest in the classics and philosophy. Banned by his college fellowship from marrying, he has no fear of permanent entanglement. Their friendship is resented by Giles Yarde, who is himself in love with Julian.

After a few weeks, Squire Yarde summons Herrick and Meg back to Devon, but the Conybeares stay on. When the Vice-Chancellor of the University, Dr John Cosin, is threatened with the loss of his position because of his supposed Catholic leanings (early 1641), the authorities begin to crack down on recusants, and three Catholic priests are arrested during the celebration of Mass. Several students found attending the service, including Kit, are reported to their colleges. Because of his burgeoning romance with Julian, Cleveland agrees to keep quiet about Kit's involvement, on condition that he abandon his Catholicism. Kit refuses to do so, and goes to London. His father pursues him there, leaving Cleveland to take advantage of his time alone with Julian. Kit is found in the entourage of the prominent Catholic courtier, Sir Kenelm Digby. Conybeare decides to leave Kit to make his own way in the world, and returns to Cambridge. Cleveland, realising that his affair with Julian must now come to an end, breaks off their relationship.

Dr Conybeare's elder son, Francis, arrives with news that Kit is back in the country and the doctor goes once more to London in the hope of persuading Kit to return to Cambridge, leaving Julian in the care of Francis. Very soon, Francis hears rumours of Julian's involvement with Cleveland, whom he hates as a result of their previous acquaintance. He confronts Cleveland and a brawl begins. When Julian attempts to intervene, Francis pushes her out of the way and she hits her head on a corner of the table and is killed outright. Her death coincides with the execution of the king's favourite, Thomas Wentworth, 1st Earl of Strafford, an alumnus of Cleveland's college, to whom she had been in the process of writing an epitaph.

In an epilogue, set in 1647, Herrick is about to be turned out of his church to make way for a Puritan incumbent. We learn that Giles and Meg Yarde have both been killed in the war, and that Dr Conybeare is in exile in Holland and Kit in France. John Cleveland has taken Julian's last poem and published it under his own name.
