= John Pelling (priest) =

John Pelling, DD (1670 – 30 March 1750) was a Canon of Windsor from 1715 to 1750.

== Life and career ==
Pelling was educated at Christ Church, Oxford where he graduated BA in 1690, MA in 1693, DD in 1703.

He was appointed:

- Rector of St Anne's Church, Soho 1704 - 1750
- Prebendary of Tetenhale in St Paul’s 1705 - 1750

Pelling was appointed to the seventh stall in St George's Chapel, Windsor Castle in 1715 and held the canonry until 1750.

Pelling died on 30 March 1750.
