= James Oswald (writer) =

British writer

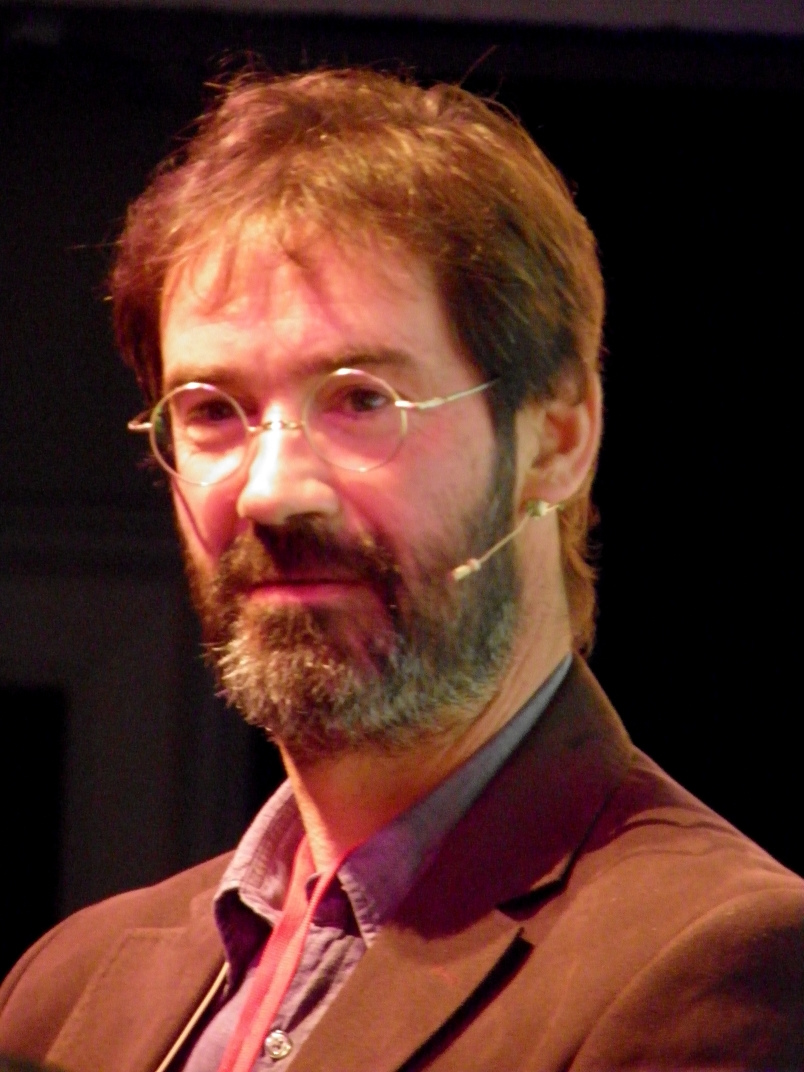
- Oswald in 2017
- Education: University of Aberdeen
- Occupations: Writer; farmer
- Website: jamesoswald.co.uk

James Oswald is a Scottish writer and farmer who has written the Inspector McLean and (as J. D. Oswald) The Ballad of Sir Benfro series of novels.

He initially self-published his books but later was published by Penguin Books. Since 2018, he has been published by Wildfire, an imprint of the Headline Publishing Group, where he has continued the Inspector McLean series and introduced a new series character Constance Fairchild.

His brother is the playwright Peter Oswald. His maternal grandfather was churchman and writer Patrick McLaughlin.

== Early life ==
Oswald was born a son of farmer and stockbroker Peter David Hamilton Oswald and Juliet (née McLaughlin). His uncle was Sir Julian Oswald, First Sea Lord from 1989 to 1993. The Oswalds were landed gentry, of Cavens, Dumfries, and Auchincruive (now named "Oswald Hall"), South Ayrshire, Scotland, descending from merchant George Oswald, Rector of the University of Glasgow from 1797 to 1799,

== Novels ==
=== Inspector McLean series ===
Inspector Anthony McLean is a detective in the Lothian and Borders Police force, stationed in Edinburgh.

Number	Title
1	Natural Causes
2	The Book of Souls
3	The Hangman's Song
4	Dead Men's Bones
5	Prayer for the Dead
6	The Damage Done
7	Written in Bones
8	The Gathering Dark
9	Cold as the Grave
10	Bury Them Deep
11	What Will Burn
12	All That Lives
13	For Our Sins
14	The Rest Is Death
15	The Violent Hour

=== Constance Fairchild series ===
Number	Title
1	No Time to Cry
2	Nothing to Hide
3	Nowhere to Run

=== The Ballad of Sir Benfro series ===
Number	Title
1	Dreamwalker
2	The Rose Cord
3	The Golden Cage
4	The Broken World
5	The Obsidian Throne

== Farming ==
He runs a livestock farm in North East Fife, where he raises Highland cattle.
