= Augusto Rivalta =

Italian sculptor

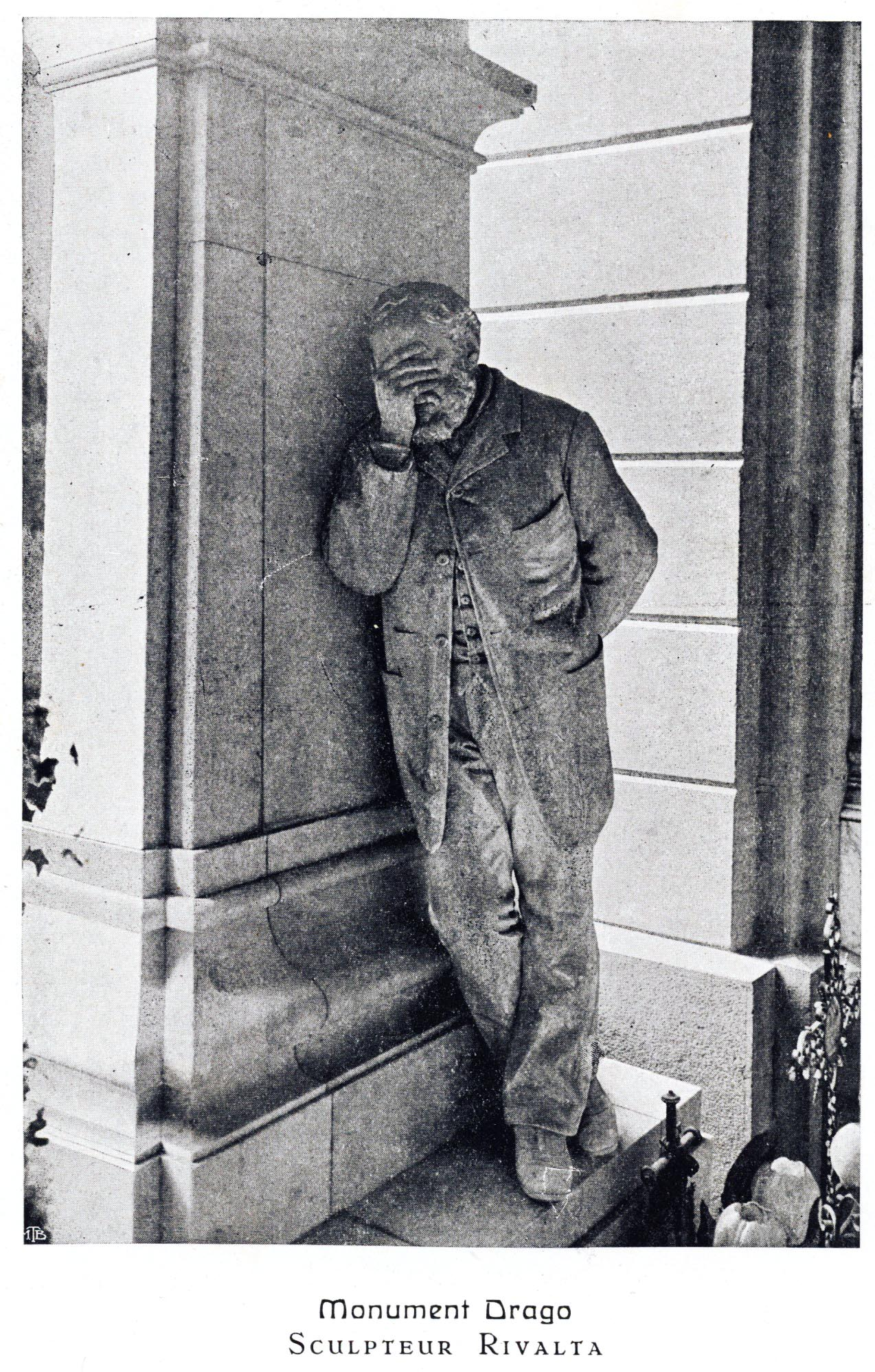
Monument on the tomb of Giulio Cesare Drago, philanthropist

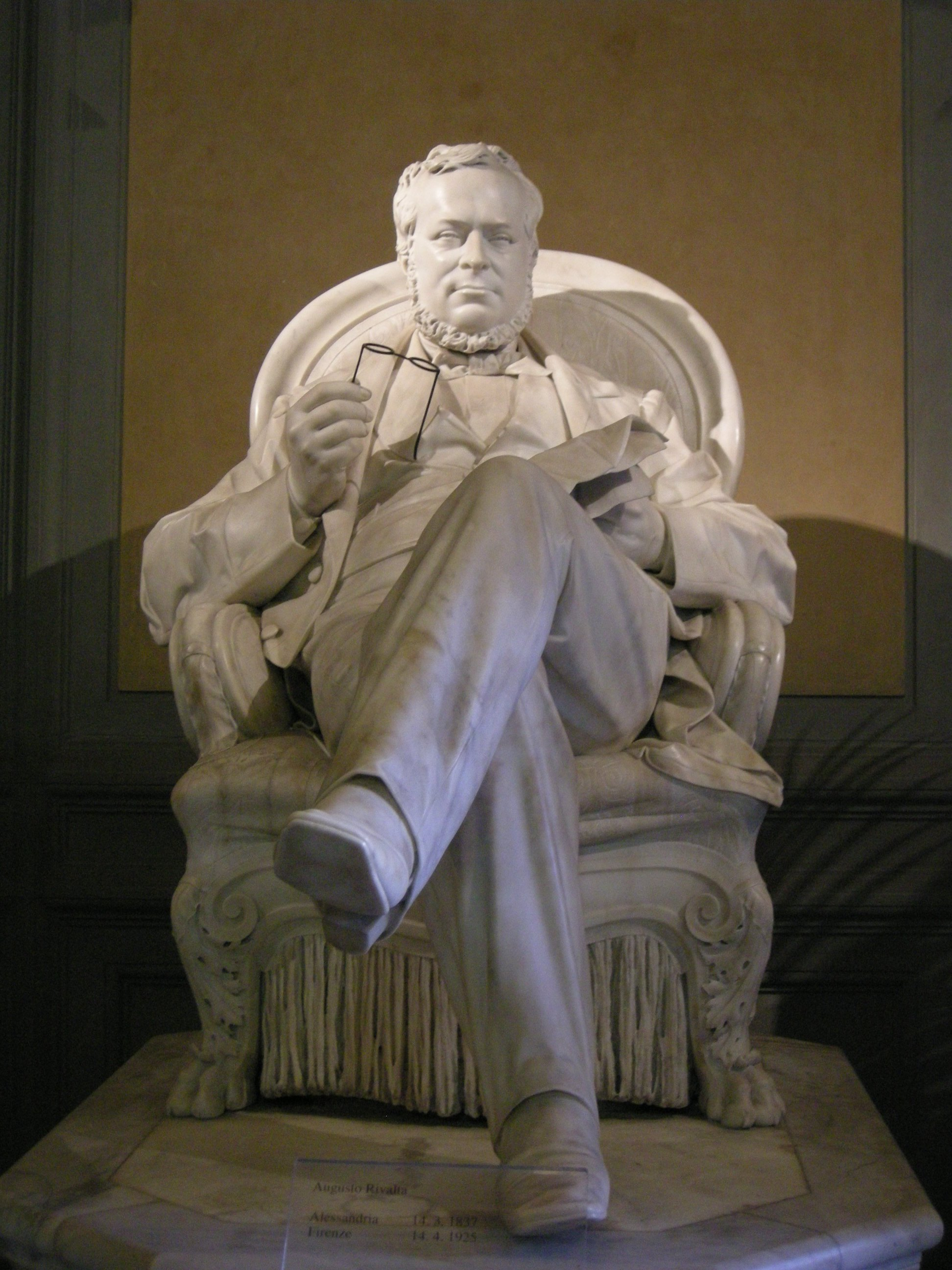
Statue of Camillo Cavour

Augusto Rivalta (1835 or 1838 – April 14, 1925) was an Italian sculptor.

== Biography ==
Rivalta was born in Alessandria, Italy, to Genoese parents. In 1859, he moved to Florence, but soon swept up in the patriotic events, he volunteered for the Genovese Carabiniere, and took part in the campaigns. He was wounded during the conflict.

He returned to Florence, where he studied with Aristodemo Costoli, and joined the studio of Giovanni Duprè. Among his first designs was for a monument to Count Cavour in Turin. While the jury sided with Rivalta, the commission was given to the more established Duprè. Rivalta's statue was placed in the courtyard of the Banca Nazionale in Florence.

Because he took part in the Risorgimento Rivalta was able to obtain commissions for memorials of many of its leaders including Garibaldi, Cavour, Ricasoli and Victor Emmanuel II. He also authored seven or eight memorials in the Staglieno cemetery in Genoa where he helped pioneer the Italian Realism movement with memorials such as those for the Carlo Raggio (1872), Pietro Ghigliani (1876), Giulio Cesare Drago (1884), and Pallavicino (1892) families. He also completed the Monument to Madama Trachil in the cemetery of Nizza Monferrato.

Among his other works are the giocatore di trottola; the marble group of Un bambino che scherza con una capra; and A wounded Zouave in ministered in the field by a Sister of Charity, while a bersagliere, launches himself with his bayonet towards the enemy (1861). he completed a Giovan Battista Niccolini once found in the Museum Capodimonte. He sculpted one of the bas-reliefs at the base of the Monument to Cavour in Turin, displaying the funereal cortege transporting the body to the cemetery. He completed the monument to the Garibaldi fighter, Savi. He completed a number of busts, and the equestrian statue of Vittorio Emanuele II for Livorno.

In 1870, he became professor of sculpture at the Florentine Academy where one of his students was Pompeo Coppini and another was Theodora Cowan.
