= St Thomas's Church, Regent Street =

Former church in London

St Thomas's Church, also known as Tenison Chapel, was an Anglican church in Regent Street, London. It was built in 1702, on the site of a wooden chapel of 1688; it was a proprietary chapel until 1869, when it became a district church dedicated to St Thomas. It closed in 1954, and was later demolished.

== History ==
Thomas Tenison (later Archbishop of Canterbury) became the first rector of St James's Church, Piccadilly in 1685. Because of the increase of population, he erected a temporary chapel, completed in 1688, in the north of the parish. It was situated between King Street (now Kingly Street) and Swallow Street, which before the construction of Regent Street was longer than at present, extending from Piccadilly to Oxford Street. (Coordinates 51.512108°N 0.139414°W.)

It was a wooden structure on a brick foundation, consisting of one large room. By 1702 the chapel was in a poor state, and a new building was erected on the site. The architect is unknown. Sir Christopher Wren, who had designed St James's Church, might have supervised the design; he was consulted in 1713 on later repairs. The building was rectangular, built of brick, with a small square tower to the west; there was a high-pitched roof over the nave and low-pitched roofs over the aisles.

The first service took place on 4 October 1702. Furnishings and decorations were completed the following year.

=== Nineteenth century ===
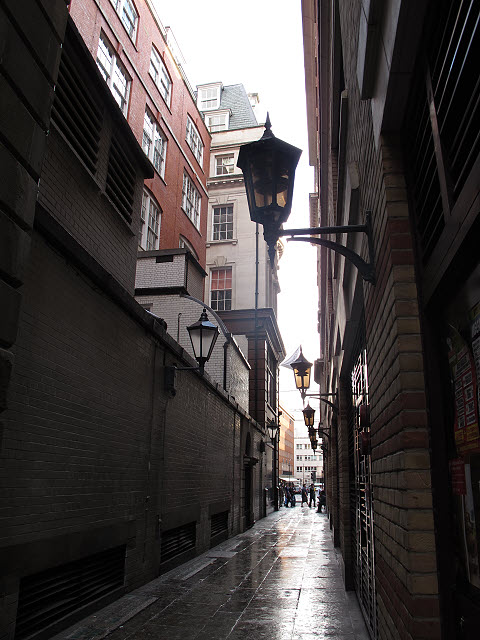
Tenison Court today, an alleyway between Regent Street (far end) and Kingly Street

In 1824, as Regent Street was planned, replacing part of Swallow Street, land to the west of the church was given up, which became part of the new street. A new façade with an entrance on Regent Street was built, funded by the Church Building Commission and designed by C. R. Cockerell. New rooms, a vestry with a schoolroom above, designed by Thomas Hardwick, were built behind the façade.

Commerce increased in the area; middle-class inhabitants left, and a greater proportion of local householders could not afford pew rent, so that the church's income decreased. In 1854, to increase income, the Regent Street frontage and schoolroom were converted into a shop and dwelling house, and a new entrance lobby was created on the side facing Chapel Court, now known as Tenison Court.

J. E. Kempe, rector of the parish from 1853, negotiated with the Ecclesiastical Commissioners for the conversion of the chapel, which was a proprietary chapel, into a district church in the parish of St James. This took place in 1869, the freehold of the building being conveyed to the Commissioners, and the church was dedicated to St Thomas.

=== Twentieth century ===
The building sustained minor damage in the Second World War. Although in 1953 the church became the parish church of the combined parishes of St Thomas's Church, St Anne's Church, Soho and St Peter's Church, Great Windmill Street (demolished after its closure in 1954), St Thomas's Church closed in 1954, and was later demolished.
