= Gerald O'Donovan =

Irish priest & writer (1871–1942)

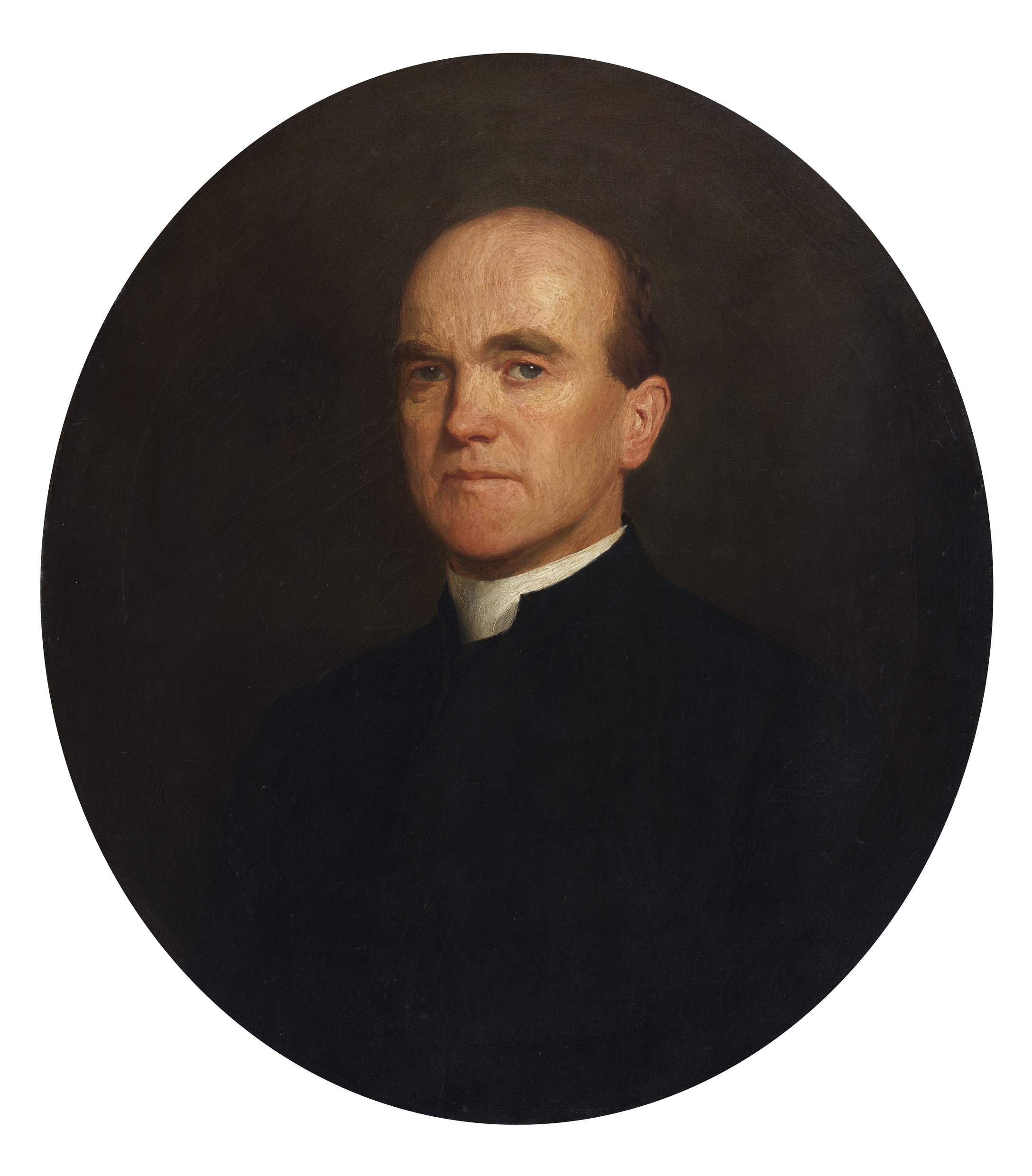

Gerald O'Donovan (born Jeremiah Donovan; 15 July 1871 – 26 July 1942) was an Irish priest and writer.

== Life and work ==
Jeremiah Donovan was born in Kilkeel, County Down, the son of a pier builder. He attended Ardnaree College in Killala and St Patrick's College, Maynooth. He left Maynooth after ordination for the Diocese of Clonfert in 1895 and was appointed as a Roman Catholic priest to Loughrea, County Galway between 1896 and 1904. He was an enthusiastic advocate of the Gaelic League and the Irish Cooperative Association, and promoted his views in articles and lectures. His literary friends included Lady Gregory, W. B. Yeats, and George Moore. He was in charge of decorating St Brendan's Cathedral, Loughrea in 1901, the financing provided by O'Donovan's close friend Edward Martyn. He quit Loughrea in 1904 after the arrival of a new bishop, Thomas O'Dea.

He moved to London but failing to find work as a priest, he left the Catholic priesthood in May 1908. He became a subwarden at Toynbee Hall in the East End in March 1910. Later that year, he married Florence Emily Beryl Verschoyle (1886–1968), the daughter of an Irish Protestant colonel fifteen years his junior. They married in Whitechapel in October 1910. They had three children, two daughters and a son.

In 1913, O'Donovan published his first and best known novel, Father Ralph, which drew in large part on his own life. He changed his first name from Jeremiah to Gerald. Another novel called Waiting was published in 1914. He joined the war effort in 1915, and rose to become head of the Italian section at the Ministry of Information in 1918. There he met his secretary and future lover, English novelist Rose Macaulay. He published a few more novels after the war: How They Did It (1920); Conquest (1920), Vocations (1921), and The Holy Tree (1922). The clandestine affair with Macaulay continued for nearly two decades. In 1939, the pair were on holiday in the Lake District when they met with a motoring accident, which damaged O'Donovan's health. He died of cancer in Albury, Surrey three years later, in July 1942. His letters to Macaulay had been destroyed the previous year when her flat in Central London was bombed during the Blitz.

In her novel The Towers of Trebizond Macaulay featured a woman character (Laurie) torn between her attraction to Christianity and her adulterous love for a married man; this is considered to reflect the author's relationship with O'Donovan.
