= The World My Wilderness =

1950 novel by Rose Macaulay

- First edition
- Author: Rose Macaulay
- Cover artist: Barbara Jones
- Language: English
- Published: 1950 Collins
- Publication place: United Kingdom
- Media type: Print (Hardback & Paperback)
- Preceded by: Fabled Shore (1949)

The World My Wilderness is a novel published in 1950 by the English novelist, biographer and traveller Rose Macaulay (1881–1958), the last but one of her novels.

== Plot summary ==
In the summer of 1945, Helen Michel is living in Southern France in the difficult aftermath of the Second World War, grieving for her late husband, a French collaborator called Maurice Michel who was mysteriously drowned in the final months of the German occupation of France. Helen is beautiful, lazy, the daughter of an Irish peer, a painter and scholar who is fond of gambling. Her seventeen-year-old daughter Barbary Deniston (Helen left her first husband, an English barrister) and her fifteen-year-old step-son Raoul Michel have run wild, associating with the Maquis, helping a guerrilla band with schemes of sabotage and harassing the Germans. Helen also has a two-year-old son by Maurice Michel, whom Barbary dotes on, but mother and daughter have grown apart.

Helen is visited in Provence by her English son Richie Deniston, Barbary's brother, who after fighting in the War is now a Cambridge undergraduate. When he returns to England, Helen sends Barbary back with him to live in London with their father, Sir Gulliver Deniston KC, and to attend the Slade School of Art. Sir Gulliver has a new wife, the ultra-conventional Pamela, and she and Barbary take a dislike to each other. At the same time, Raoul's grandmother Madame Michel also sends him to London, to live with an uncle who is in business there.

Barbary has no wish to adjust to the respectable life of her father and stepmother. She discovers the bombed but flowering wasteland of the City of London in the shadow of St Paul's Cathedral. Here she and Raoul find an echo of the wilderness of the Maquis and make friends with the spivs and deserters living on the fringes of society.

Barbary and Raoul adopt an empty flat in Somerset Chambers and a bombed-out Anglican church, St Giles's, where Barbary paints a mural of the Last Judgment and confronts the fear and emptiness within herself. Poetic descriptions of the past and present of the City of London and its ruined churches are intertwined with Barbary's moral and religious confusion.

On a family holiday to the Scottish Highlands, staying with an uncle who is a leading psychiatrist, Barbary becomes alarmed by his wish to question her, steals money from her aunt, and runs away back to London. There, she takes to shoplifting, but in running away from the police she has a terrible fall among the ruins of the City and is nearly killed. With Barbary hanging between life and death, her mother returns to London, staying with her former husband. The novel reaches its conclusion with a reconciliation between Barbary and her mother (Barbary explaining that she had nothing to do with the drowning of Maurice) and with a revelation about her conception.

== Aftermath ==
Soon after writing The World My Wilderness, Rose Macaulay rejoined the Church of England.

== Criticism ==
In their article on Macaulay in the Dictionary of National Biography, Constance Babington Smith and Katherine Mullin say "The World My Wilderness (1950) showed that new depths of pity had transmuted her satirical approach."

== Film, TV or theatrical adaptations ==
The World My Wilderness was adapted into a BBC Radio 4 play in ten episodes, first broadcast between 25 March and 5 April 2002.

== Publication details ==
- First UK edition: Collins, London, May 1950, 254pp, red cloth lettered in gilt on spine, with a pictorial dustwrapper by Barbara Jones
- US: Little, Brown paperback, December 1987, 254 pp, ISBN 978-0-86068-340-7
- Virago Modern Classics paperback, 1992, introduced by Penelope Fitzgerald, 266 pp, ISBN 0-86068-340-0
