= Emma Maria Pearson =

British Red Cross nurse

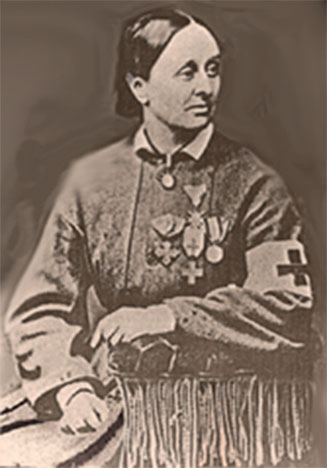
- Emma Maria Pearson photographed in Rome after serving as a battle-front nurse during the Serbo-Turkish War of 1876
- Born: 1828
- Died: 1893 (aged 64–65)

Emma Maria Pearson (1828–1893), the daughter of Captain Charles Pearson, RN, of Great Yarmouth, Norfolk, was a writer and one of the first British women to serve as a nurse for the Red Cross.

Both the French and Germans awarded medals to her for running ambulances (as field hospitals were then called) during the Franco-Prussian War of 1870. She also gained the Gold Cross of the Order of the Takova for work in the Serbo-Turkish war, the prelude to the Russo-Turkish War (1877–78).

== Life ==
An account of Emma's nursing career is given in the article on her partner Louisa McLaughlin (1836–1921) who shared the same wartime adventures. Later they jointly set up one of London's only two private nursing homes where they assisted the originator of antiseptic surgery Joseph Lister in many operations.

== Works ==
Louisa co-authored with Emma two narratives of their battlefront experiences Our Adventures During the War of 1870, and Service in Servia Under the Red Cross. They also wrote a brief history of wartime nursing as a series of papers in the St. James's Magazine, reprinted in book form in 1872 with the title Under the Red Cross. The last two chapters document a multitude of failings in Colonel Loyd-Lindsay's chairmanship of the National Society for Aid to the Sick and Wounded in War (precursor to the British Red Cross). Facsimiles of the original two volumes (364 & 418 pages) of Our Adventures are available as eBooks. There is also an eBook of Service in Servia.

Between wars Emma wrote two three-decker novels His Little Cousin: A Tale (London, 1875) and One Love in a Life (London: 1874). The latter, available as an eBook, is dedicated to "the dear friend, 'tender and true,' who shared hardship and danger by my side, Louisa E. McLaughlin, in loving remembrance of 1870." The story demonstrates that women's rights are not needed for good women to overcome their problems, while the rest cannot organize themselves owing to petty rivalries. The Daily Telegraph review said: "The tone is elevating, and the descriptions of scenery and society excellent."

Emma was also the author of From Rome to Mentana. In 2002 a facsimile reprint of this 354-page travel book was published as an Elibron Classic by Adamant Media Corporation of London. When From Rome to Mentana originally came out in 1868, it was praised by an anonymous reviewer in the Gentleman's Magazine, which at that time was edited by Edward Walford, who also happened to have edited the book. Walford was an eminent writer of local histories, and the compiler of Walford's County Families. He was the uncle of Emma's sister Harriet's husband, John Desborough Walford.

Emma's work often appeared in the St James's Magazine and in Temple Bar, both literary periodicals with eminent contributors such as Anthony Trollope. She twice reported seeing ghosts to the Journal of the Society for Psychical Research.
