= Louisa McLaughlin =

British Red Cross nurse

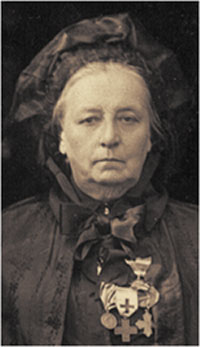
Louisa McLaughlin in full mourning eight years after the death of her partner Emma Maria Pearson

Louisa Elisabeth McLaughlin (1836–1921) was one of the first British women to serve as a nurse for the Red Cross. Louisa, who often spelled her name MacLaughlin and was familiarly called Louise, is pictured wearing medals awarded by both the French and Germans for running ambulances (as field hospitals were then called) during the Franco-Prussian War of 1870. She also wears the Gold Cross of the Order of the Takova marking her work in the Serbo-Turkish war, the prelude to the Russo-Turkish War (1877–78). Her partner Emma Maria Pearson (1828–93) was awarded the same medals.

== Background and training ==
Louisa was daughter of Rev. Hubert McLaughlin (1805–1882), and the Frederica Crofton (1816–1881). Hubert McLaughlin was Rector of Burford, Shropshire, a Rural Dean, and a Prebendary in Hereford Cathedral. He began his clerical career as domestic chaplain to Edward Crofton, 2nd Baron Crofton (1806–89), Representative Peer for Ireland and Lord-in-Waiting to Queen Victoria.

In 1835, Hubert married Frederica, who was Lord Crofton's youngest sister. Louisa, their first child, was born in Nice, where her father had become the minister of the Church of England chapel. At that time Nice was a part of the Italian Kingdom of Sardinia.

Louisa was the eldest of three sisters, one of whom, Sophia, served as a nurse with the Universities' Mission to Central Africa for five years, until she took charge of wards at the Civil Hospital in Kandy, Ceylon (now Sri Lanka) in 1893.

Louisa's brothers included a Major General Edward McLaughlin, Judge Frederick McLaughlin, Royal Navy Captain Charles McLaughlin, the agent to the Earl of Feversham (William McLaughlin), and two Church of England clergymen the Rev. Alfred McLaughlin, whose son was Christian thinker Father Patrick McLaughlin, and the Rev. Randolph McLaughlin Berens, who became a wealthy collector of antiquities). Two other brothers died in childhood.

Louisa was trained as a nurse by Sister Dora, who cared for industrial workers in Walsall, to become her favourite pupil. Florence Nightingale shared Louisa's high opinion of Sister Dora. She was invited to unveil the statue to Sister Dora in 1886, but had to decline from sickness, to send a fine tribute with her regrets.

Louisa and Emma started working for the National Health Society as soon as it was established in 1869. The Society, which undertook relief work for the London poor and gave lectures on health education, was founded by Europe's first modern woman doctor, Elizabeth Blackwell, an Englishwoman who had gained a degree in New York.

== Wartime nursing ==
On 16 August 1870, less than a month after the outbreak of the Franco-Prussian War, Louisa and Emma went to France at the behest of the National Society for Aid to the Sick and Wounded in War (precursor to the British Red Cross) formed only 12 days previously. A week later they were nursing about 100 men desperately wounded in the Battle of Gravelotte.

They were then invited to join the Anglo-American Ambulance in Sedan by its surgeon-in-chief, Dr. J. Marion Sims. After passing through fields of burned corpses the nurses arrived just after the Battle of Sedan had left 5,000 dead and 20,000 wounded. The Ambulance, set up in a barracks, had beds for 384. Its eight British and eight American surgeons also attended to another 200 in tents.

After a month in Sedan, Emma and Louisa returned to England, where they learned that the National Society would not support them if they set up an ambulance for which the Bishop of Orléans was pleading. They therefore made an independent appeal in The Times. This enabled them to return to France with 4,000 pounds of stores in November, just after the first Battle of Orléans.

They established their Ambulance Anglaise in a convent in a suburb of Orléans. Within weeks the second major battle broke out. The convent was at the center of the heaviest fighting. Despite the turmoil, compounded by shortages of food, drink and supplies, out of 1,400 patients the nurses lost only 40. This death-rate was far the lowest of any field station in the area because Emma and Louisa had insisted on "exquisite cleanliness" at a time when most surgeons did not wash their hands.

When the Serbo-Turkish War began in August 1876 Emma and Louisa were living in Hampstead. They immediately set off as volunteers to work with the Red Cross Society of Servia. Armed with green-lined parasols and Hartin's Crimson Salt disinfectant, they took care of wounded Servian soldiers who had been struggling against Turkish oppression.

== Pioneer nursing home ==
Upon returning to England, Emma and Louisa used their joint capital to set up one of London's only two private nursing homes. Their Medical and Surgical Home was located at 15 Fitzroy Square.

That same year, 1877, the originator of antiseptic surgery Joseph Lister moved from Edinburgh to become Professor of Clinical Surgery at King's College Hospital, London, and immediately began placing private patients at the Medical and Surgical Home. They soon occupied most of the 10 available beds. Lister visited his patients every morning, and did many operations assisted by Emma and Louisa.

About 1890 they sold the nursing home to move to Florence, Italy, where Emma died of cancer.

== Author ==
Louisa co-authored with Emma two accounts of their nursing experiences Our Adventures During the War of 1870, and Service in Servia Under the Red Cross. They also wrote a brief history of wartime nursing titled Under the Red Cross, the last two chapters of which document a multitude of failings in Colonel Loyd-Lindsay's chairmanship of the National Society for Aid to the Sick and Wounded in War.
