= Rose Macaulay =

English writer (1881–1958)

Dame Rose Macaulay DBE
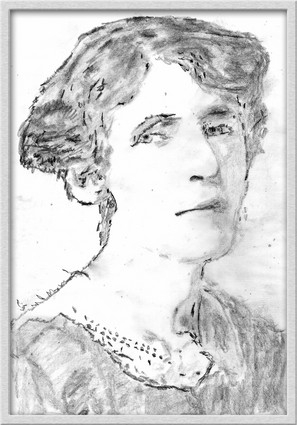
- Pencil sketch of Rose Macaulay
- Born: Emilie Rose Macaulay; 1 August 1881; Rugby, Warwickshire, England
- Died: 30 October 1958 (aged 77)
- Citizenship: United Kingdom
- Education: Oxford High School for Girls
- Alma mater: Somerville College, Oxford
- Partner: Gerald O'Donovan (c. 1918–1942)
- Writing career
- Notable works: They Were Defeated (1932); The World My Wilderness (1950); The Towers of Trebizond (1956)
- Notable awards: James Tait Black Memorial Prize (1956); Dame Commander of the Order of the British Empire (1958)

Dame Emilie Rose Macaulay, DBE (1 August 1881 – 30 October 1958) was an English writer, most noted for her award-winning novel The Towers of Trebizond, about a small Anglo-Catholic group crossing Turkey by camel.

The story is seen as a spiritual autobiography, reflecting her own changing and conflicting beliefs. Macaulay's novels were partly influenced by Virginia Woolf. She also wrote biographies, travelogues and poetry.

== Early years and education ==
Macaulay was born in Rugby, Warwickshire the daughter of George Campbell Macaulay, a classical scholar, and his wife, Grace Mary (née Conybeare). Her father was descended in the male-line directly from the Macaulay family of Lewis. She was educated at Oxford High School for Girls and read Modern History at Somerville College at Oxford University. In 1906 her father, George Campbell Macaulay, moved to Southernwood, a grand house in Great Shelford, near Cambridge. She spent much of her time in the company of the poet Rupert Brooke, a family friend. During the First World War, she worked as a land girl in Shelford. Here she was inspired to write a collection of poems called "On the Land 1916" recalling the hard work and companionship of those days.

== Career ==
Macaulay began writing her first novel, Abbots Verney (published 1906), after leaving Somerville and while living with her parents at Ty Isaf, near Aberystwyth, in Wales. Later novels include The Lee Shore (1912), Potterism (1920), Dangerous Ages (1921), Told by an Idiot (1923), And No Man's Wit (1940), The World My Wilderness (1950), and The Towers of Trebizond (1956). Her non-fiction work includes They Went to Portugal, Catchwords and Claptrap, a biography of John Milton, and Pleasure of Ruins. Macaulay's fiction was influenced by Virginia Woolf and Anatole France.

Her dystopian novel What Not (1918) deals with eugenics and misinformation in a fictional version of England. It was first published in 1918, then withdrawn and republished in 1919 with some passages removed.

During World War I Macaulay worked in the British Propaganda Department, after some time as a nurse and later as a civil servant in the War Office. She pursued a romantic affair with Gerald O'Donovan, a writer and former Jesuit priest, whom she met in 1918; the relationship lasted until his death, in 1942. During the interwar period she was a sponsor of the pacifist Peace Pledge Union; however, she resigned from the PPU and later recanted her pacifism in 1940. In the same period, she found new audiences through broadcasts on the BBC, and as a columnist in journals such as The Spectator, The Listener, and Time and Tide. In January 1941, Macaulay wrote: "The pageant of life is enormously enriched by the presence of so many foreigners in our midst...the uniforms of Polish soldiers mingle with those of the Czechs, Norwegians, Dutch and Free French...And not only foreigners. Driving in the country, you are continually hailed by the rich accents of young men in battle-dress from Alberta and Montreal, who seldom know where they are, and always want to go somewhere else. They are as a rule enormously charming".

Her London flat was destroyed in the Blitz, and she had to rebuild her life and library from scratch, as documented in the semi-autobiographical short story, Miss Anstruther's Letters, which was published in 1942.

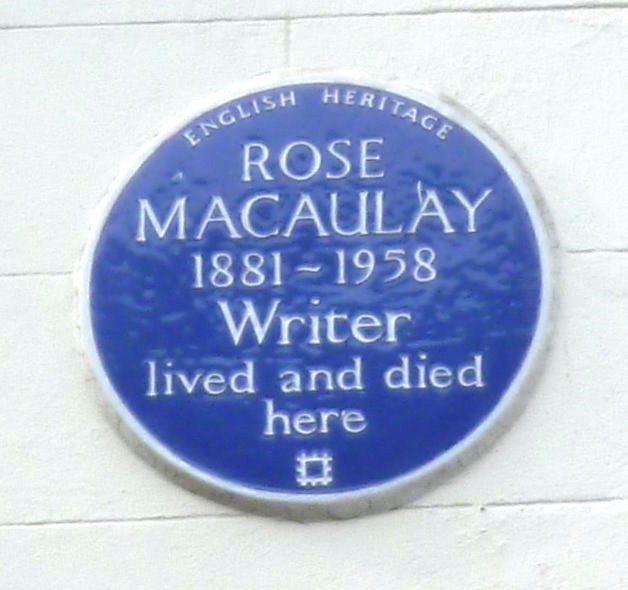
The blue plaque on Hinde House at 11–14 Hinde Street where Macaulay lived from 1941 until her death

The Towers of Trebizond, her final novel, is generally regarded as her masterpiece. Strongly autobiographical, it treats with wistful humour and deep sadness the attractions of mystical Christianity, and the irremediable conflict between adulterous love and the demands of the Christian faith. For this work, she received the James Tait Black Memorial Prize in 1956.

== Personal life ==
Macaulay was never a simple believer in "mere Christianity", and her writings reveal a more complex, mystical sense of the Divine. That said, she did not return to the Anglican church until 1953; she had been an ardent secularist before and, while religious themes pervade her novels, previous to her conversion she often treats Christianity satirically, for instance in Going Abroad and The World My Wilderness.

Macaulay never married. She was created a Dame Commander of the Order of the British Empire (DBE) on 31 December 1957 in the 1958 New Year Honours and died ten months later, on 30 October 1958, aged 77. She was an active feminist throughout her life.

Macaulay Avenue in Great Shelford is named after her.

== Works ==
Fiction:

- Abbots Verney (1906) John Murray
- The Furnace (1907) John Murray
- The Secret River (1909) John Murray
- The Valley Captives (1911) John Murray
- Views and Vagabonds (1912) John Murray
- The Lee Shore (1913) Hodder & Stoughton
- The Making of a Bigot (c 1914) Hodder & Stoughton
- Non-Combatants and Others (1916) Hodder & Stoughton
- What Not: A Prophetic Comedy (1918)
- Potterism (1920) William Collins
- Dangerous Ages (1921) William Collins
- Mystery At Geneva: An Improbable Tale of Singular Happenings (1922) William Collins
- Told by an Idiot (1923) William Collins
- Orphan Island (1924) William Collins
- Crewe Train (1926) William Collins
- Keeping Up Appearances (1928) William Collins
- Staying with Relations (1930) William Collins
- They Were Defeated (1932) William Collins
- Going Abroad (1934) William Collins
- I Would Be Private (1937) William Collins
- And No Man's Wit (1940) William Collins
- The World My Wilderness (1950) William Collins
- The Towers of Trebizond (1956) William Collins

Poetry:

- The Two Blind Countries (1914) Sidgwick & Jackson
- Picnic: July 1917, with guns in France audible
- Three Days (1919) Constable
- Misfortunes, with engravings by Stanley Morison (1930)

Non-fiction:

- A Casual Commentary (1925) Methuen
- Some Religious Elements in English Literature (1931) Hogarth
- Milton (1934) Duckworth
- Personal Pleasures (1935) Gollancz
- The Minor Pleasures of Life (1936) Gollancz
- An Open Letter (1937) Peace Pledge Union
- The Writings of E.M. Forster (1938) Hogarth
- Life Among the English (1942) William Collins
- Southey in Portugal (1945) Nicholson & Watson
- They Went to Portugal (1946) Jonathan Cape
- Evelyn Waugh (1946) Horizon
- Fabled Shore: From the Pyrenees to Portugal By Road (1949) Hamish Hamilton
- Pleasure of Ruins (1953) Thames & Hudson
- Coming to London (1957) Phoenix House
- Letters to a Friend 1950–1952 (1961) William Collins. (edited by Constance Babington Smith)
- Last Letters to a Friend 1952–1958 (1962) William Collins. (edited by Constance Babington Smith)
- Letters to a Sister (1964) William Collins. (edited by Constance Babington Smith)
- They Went to Portugal Too (1990) (The second part of They Went to Portugal, not published with the 1946 edition because of paper restrictions.) Carcanet
