= Ary Stillman =

Russian-American painter

Ary Stillman (February 13, 1891 – January 28, 1967) was a Russian-American representational and abstract painter. He excelled in art as a youth, and after graduating from school he was accepted into the Imperial School of Art in Vilna.

== Immigration to the United States ==
Stillman was born in Hresk near Slutsk, (today in Belarus). immigrated to the United States after less than two years at the Imperial School, landing in Sioux City, Iowa at the age of 16. He worked in a local jewelry store to pay the bills, but spent every moment he could painting. After a short stint at the Art Institute of Chicago, Stillman once again was on the move, relocating to New York City in 1919 at the age of 28. In New York, he studied at the National Academy of Design (the predecessor of what is now the National Academy Museum and School of Fine Arts).

== The Paris years ==
Never one to let grass beneath his feet, Stillman once again moved in 1921, this time to Paris, where he lived and worked for 12 years. He experienced commercial and artistic success in Paris, including a one-man show at the Galerie Bernheim-Jeune and regular exhibits at the Salon d'Automne, Salon des Echanges (1932), Salone National des Beaux-Arts and the Salon de Tulleries. Although his work had been largely objective until the early 1930s, a careful study of his early art reveals the roots of his later abstract work and shows his interest in the artistic arrangement of shapes to convey a subjective meaning.

== The Holocaust triggers a move towards abstract art ==
Stillman returned to New York City in 1933 as a successful and well-known artist. Among other galleries, from 1935 to 1937 Stillman exhibited at the Guild Art Gallery owned and directed by Margaret Lefranc. His work during this time became more subjective (although still representational). At this time Stillman became more concerned with his interpretation of the deeper inner content of his subject, and less interested with its objective outer form. When the horrors of the Holocaust were revealed, Stillman abruptly shifted his focus to abstract works, and by 1948, his work was completely non-objective. During the early 1950s, he had a one-person show every year at the Bertha Schaefer Gallery in New York City.

== Later life ==
In the mid-1950s after becoming almost blind in one eye and losing his treasured Manhattan studio to city developers, Stillman became depressed. He could not seem to find the right environment to help him out of his depression, trying Paris, Mallorca and New York City before moving to Mexico in early 1957. He lived and worked in Mexico for five years, returning to the United States and settling in Houston (where his sister lived), where he lived out the rest of his days. Stillman died on January 28, 1967. Upon his death, the Stillman-Lack foundation was found, in accordance with his instructions, to preserve his work and make it available.

== At Columbia University ==
In 2010 Columbia University received from the Stillman-Lack Foundation a collection of art works by Stillman, making Columbia the largest international repository of his works. Of the ninety painting and drawings donated to the University, twenty-five have been allocated as gifts to graduating doctoral candidates in the Department of Art History and Archaeology who are recipients of a Stillman fellowship. The remaining sixty-five paintings, drawings, watercolors, and prints are part of the University art collection, housed in and stewarded by Art Properties, Avery Library.
