= Scent of Apricots on the Fields =

1944 painting by Arshile Gorky

- Artist: Arshile Gorky
- Year: 1944
- Medium: oil-on-canvas
- Movement: Abstract art
- Dimensions: 78.7 cm × 111.8 cm (31.0 in × 44.0 in)
- Owner: Private collection

Scent of Apricots on the Fields; also sometimes shortened to simply Scent of Apricots; is an oil-on-canvas painting by Armenian-American artist Arshile Gorky. Painted towards the end of Gorky's career in 1944, the painting reflects the peak of Gorky's artistic output and departure from his previous influences towards a distinct style. The painting was produced in the same year as The Liver Is the Cock's Comb; Gorky's most celebrated work.

== Background ==
Arshile Gorky was born in 1904 in a largely Armenian region in the Ottoman Empire. Fleeing the Armenian genocide, Gorky moved to Providence, Rhode Island in 1920. Gorky's artistic career began in 1923, with his enrollment in the New England School of Art and Design in Boston. In the 1920s, he drew primarily from impressionism with special attention towards Paul Cézanne. Later in the 1930s, Gorky worked with various art galleries in New York City; and also worked as part of the Federal Art Project. By this point, Gorky had begun to experiment with cubist and surrealist influences. During the 1940s; when Gorky painted Scent of Apricots on the Fields; Gorky moved away from his previous influences towards surrealism and pastoralism.

== Title ==
The painting has over time been called both Scent of Apricots on the Fields and the shortened title Scent of Apricots. The former title is first known to appear in a critical catalogue of Gorky's work in 1982, 34 years after the artists death in 1948. As such, the Arshile Gorky Foundation (an organization which seeks to promote public knowledge of Gorky's artistic output) considers the longer title posthumous and refers to it by the shortened title. Gorky's final art dealer before his death; Julien Levy; also refers to the painting as simply Scent of Apricots in his monograph on Gorky.

Both titles make reference to the fruit apricots. In a 1942 questionnaire; conducted two years prior to the completion of the painting, Arshile Gorky cited apricots; particularly their shape; as being something he enjoyed about his childhood home in Armenia. In an interview conducted in 2010 with Gorky's widow Agnes "Mougouch" Magruder; she states that apricot; alongside cherry; orchards were a source of nostalgia for him.

== Description ==
Scent of Apricots on the Fields is a highly abstract painting featuring rounded geometric designs painted using a color palette of primarily warm colors ranging from soft pinks, reds, and oranges. The painting also features a technique of paint dripping in the top of the frame and towards the central white section; creating a "melting" visual effect. Towards the top of the painting, the red is used to create a sky-like formation; meanwhile a section of green at the bottom resembles a table.

== Analysis ==
The abstract nature of Scent of Apricots on the Fields has led to varying interpretations of the painting. The choice of colors and general mosiac shape of the figures depicted have led Scent of Apricots on the Fields to be read as a landscape painting evoking the caucasus mountains; where Arshile Gorky was raised. The painting may also be inspired by landscapes of rural Virginia and Sherman, Connecticut; where Gorky spent much of his career. In addition, the figures in the painting have been compared to plant and human anatomy. Throughout his artistic career, Gorky frequently worked with body parts in his artwork; with The Liver Is the Cock's Comb depicting a liver, and earlier paintings invoking genitalia. The painting is often seen as nostalgic, with note being given to the fact that Gorky often lied about his upbringing and background. American art critic Peter Schjeldahl argued that the dubious nature of the paintings' nostalgic elements made it "poetic" but also "treacly" and "banal".

The years from 1940 to his suicide by hanging in 1948 are often seen as the pinnacle of Gorky's artistry, with Scent of Apricots on the Fields being included as part of his creative peak.

The use of drip painting by Gorky in Scent of Apricots on the Fields has drawn comparisons to Jackson Pollock, who also widely used the method. The paintings abstract style has also drawn comparisons to the work of surrealists André Masson, Roberto Matta, Pablo Picasso, Wassily Kandinsky, and Joan Miró.

As part of their coverage of an exhibition of Gorky's work at the Museum of Contemporary Art, Los Angeles, Armenian-American newspaper Asbarez cited Scent of Apricots on the Fields; alongside Gorky's The Plow and the Song series; as works "remarkable for their evocative strength, lyrical beauty, and fecundity of organic forms."

== Exhibition history ==
Scent of Apricots on the Fields has been exhibited several times, usually as part of greater showcases of Gorky's work. Being that the painting is held in a private collection, exhibitions of the painting rely on special museum and gallery loans. The painting appeared as part of Ardent Nature: Arshile Gorky Landscapes, 1943–47; a 2017 exhibition of Gorky's later landscape paintings curated by his granddaughter Saskia Spender and held at Hauser & Wirth's New York gallery. The presence of Scent of Apricots on the Fields at Ardent Nature was also accompanied by the study of the painting. From 2009 to 2010; the painting was included in Arshile Gorky: A Retrospective; a touring exhibition of Gorky's work that visited the Philadelphia Museum of Art, Tate Modern, and Museum of Contemporary Art, Los Angeles; though Scent of Apricots was exclusively exhibited in the Philadelphia section of the tour.

Other past exhibitions of Scent of Apricots include the International Surrealist Exhibition from 1960 to 1961 in New York City, the 27th Annual Exhibition by the Society for Contemporary Art in 1967 at the Art Institute of Chicago, and Abstract Expressionism: A Tribute to Harold Rosenberg: Paintings and Drawings from Chicago Collections in 1979 at the University of Chicago.

The study of Scent of Apricots has a largely separate exhibition history; with it traveling between Venice and Lausanne from 1990 to 1993 as part of Arshile Gorky: Works on Paper, and appearing as part of Action Painting: arte americana 1940–1970: dal disegno all'opera in Modena from 2004 to 2005.
