= Cockscomb (disambiguation) =

Cockscomb is a fleshy growth or crest on the top of the head of a male fowl.

Cockscomb may also refer to:

- Rhinanthus minor, a species of flowering plant
- Certain species of the ornamental plant genus Celosia, if the flower heads are crested by fasciation
  - Celosia argentea var. cristata, an herbaceous plant resembling the head of a rooster
- Cockscomb (mountain), a mountain in the Eastern Cape province of South Africa
- The Cockscomb, a ridge in southern Utah; see U.S. Route 89 in Utah
- Cockscomb (Tuolumne Meadows)
- A type of cap and bells or jester's cap

== See also ==
- Coxcomb (disambiguation)
- Celosia argentea or plumed cockscomb, an herbaceous plant of tropical origin
- Cockscomb Basin Wildlife Sanctuary in Belize
