= The Artist and His Mother =

Pair of paintings by Arshile Gorky

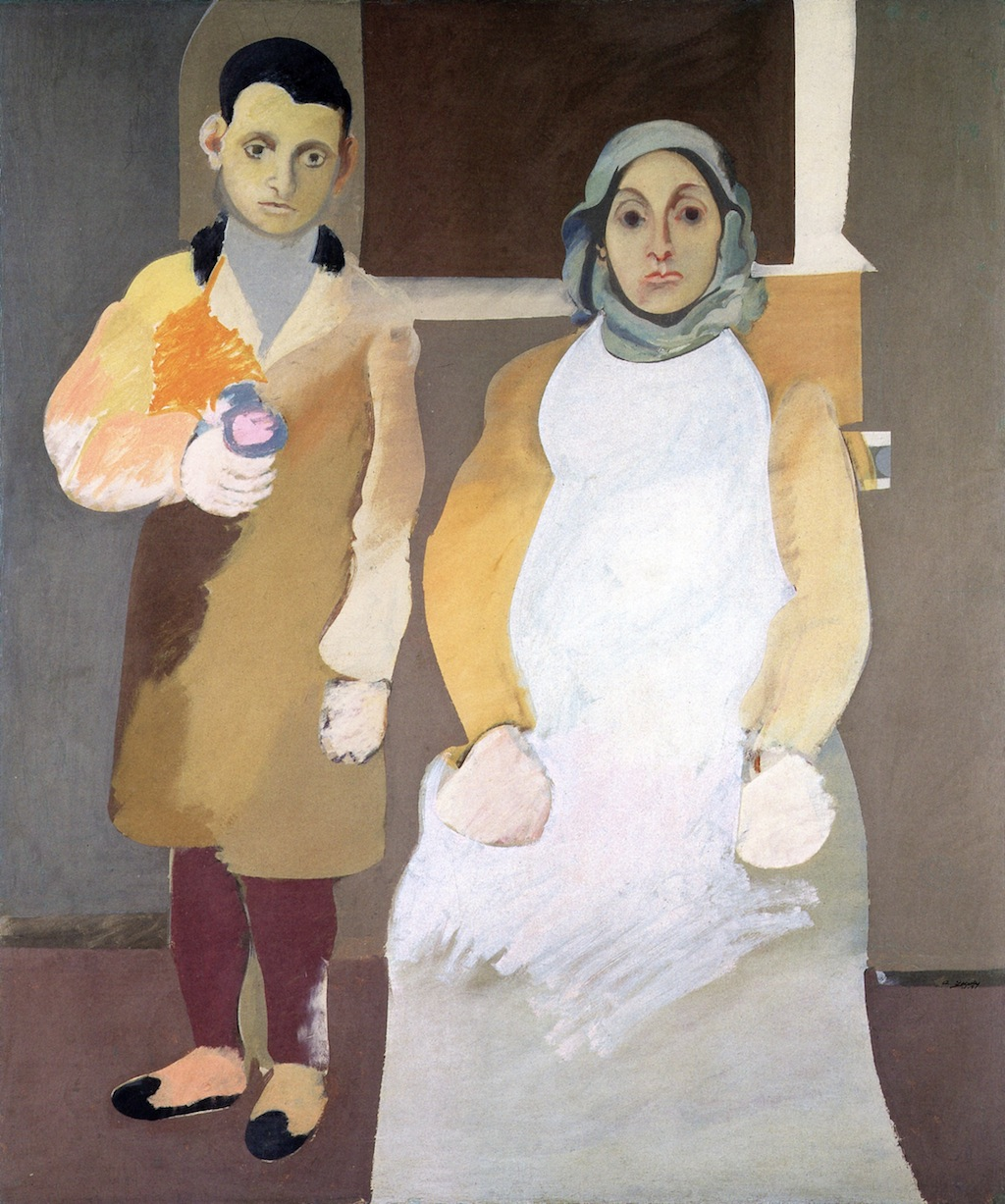
- Artist: Arshile Gorky
- Year: 1926–c. 1936
- Dimensions: 150 cm × 127.6 cm (60 in × 50.25 in)
- Location: Whitney Museum of American Art, New York City
- Accession: 50.17

The Artist and His Mother are a pair of oil paintings on canvas of the same subject matter made between 1926 and c. 1942 by the Armenian-American artist Arshile Gorky. The paintings, both of which were completed after Gorky had emigrated from Armenia to the United States in the aftermath of the Armenian genocide, depict Gorky as a child standing next to his mother who is shown seated.

The earlier work, dated 1926 to c. 1936, has been held in the permanent collection of the Whitney Museum of American Art in New York since 1950. The other painting, dated c. 1926 to c. 1942, has been owned by the National Gallery of Art in Washington, D.C., since 1979.

== Analysis ==
The Artist and His Mother
- Artist: Arshile Gorky
- Year: c. 1926-c. 1942
- Medium: Oil on canvas
- Dimensions: 152.2 cm × 130 cm (59.94 in × 50 in)
- Location: National Gallery of Art, Washington, D.C.
- Accession: 1979.13.1

Gorky began working on both paintings in 1926, six years after emigrating to the United States and reuniting with his father and sisters, and reworked them extensively for over a decade. They are based on a surviving family photograph taken in a studio in Van (then part of the Ottoman Empire) in 1912, seven years before Gorky's mother died of starvation during the Armenian genocide. The photograph was made to send to Gorky's father in the United States, who had fled in 1908 to avoid a military draft.

The works are compositionally similar, differentiated by the choice of the color palette; the earlier painting uses "pale gold, fresh yellow and ochre, livid green and creams glowing", while the later one is painted in "warm rose and terracotta" colors.

== Reception ==
The works are said to have become "a powerful symbol of the 1915 Armenian genocide". Linda Yablonsky, writing for The New York Times, described it as a "powerful picture of loss". Jonathan Jones called it "one of the most distressing and powerful of portraits." The pair have been described as "haunting" and "stark as a Byzantine icon."
