= Anna Walinska =

American painter

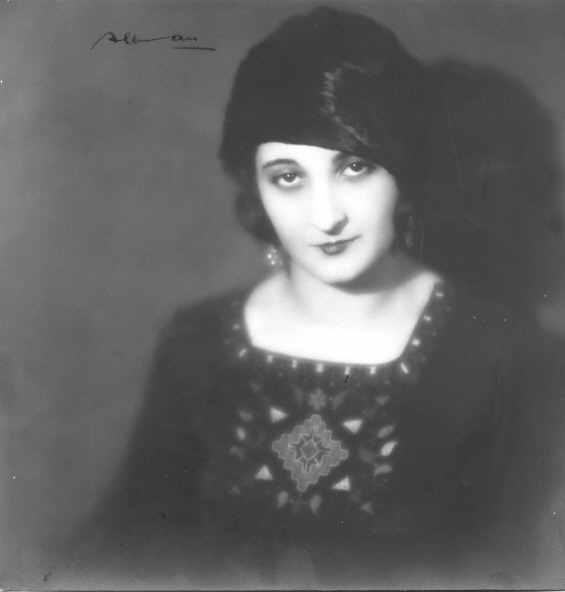
Anna Walinska, Paris, 1926

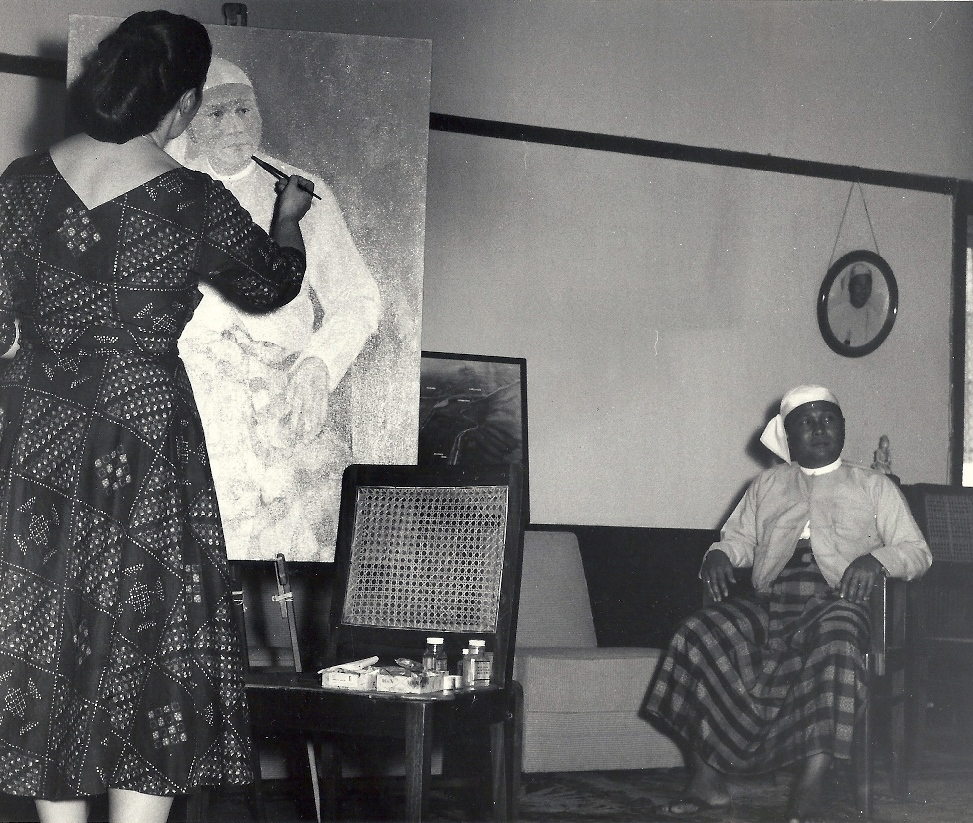
Anna Walinska painting the portrait of Burmese Prime Minister U Nu, Rangoon, 1955

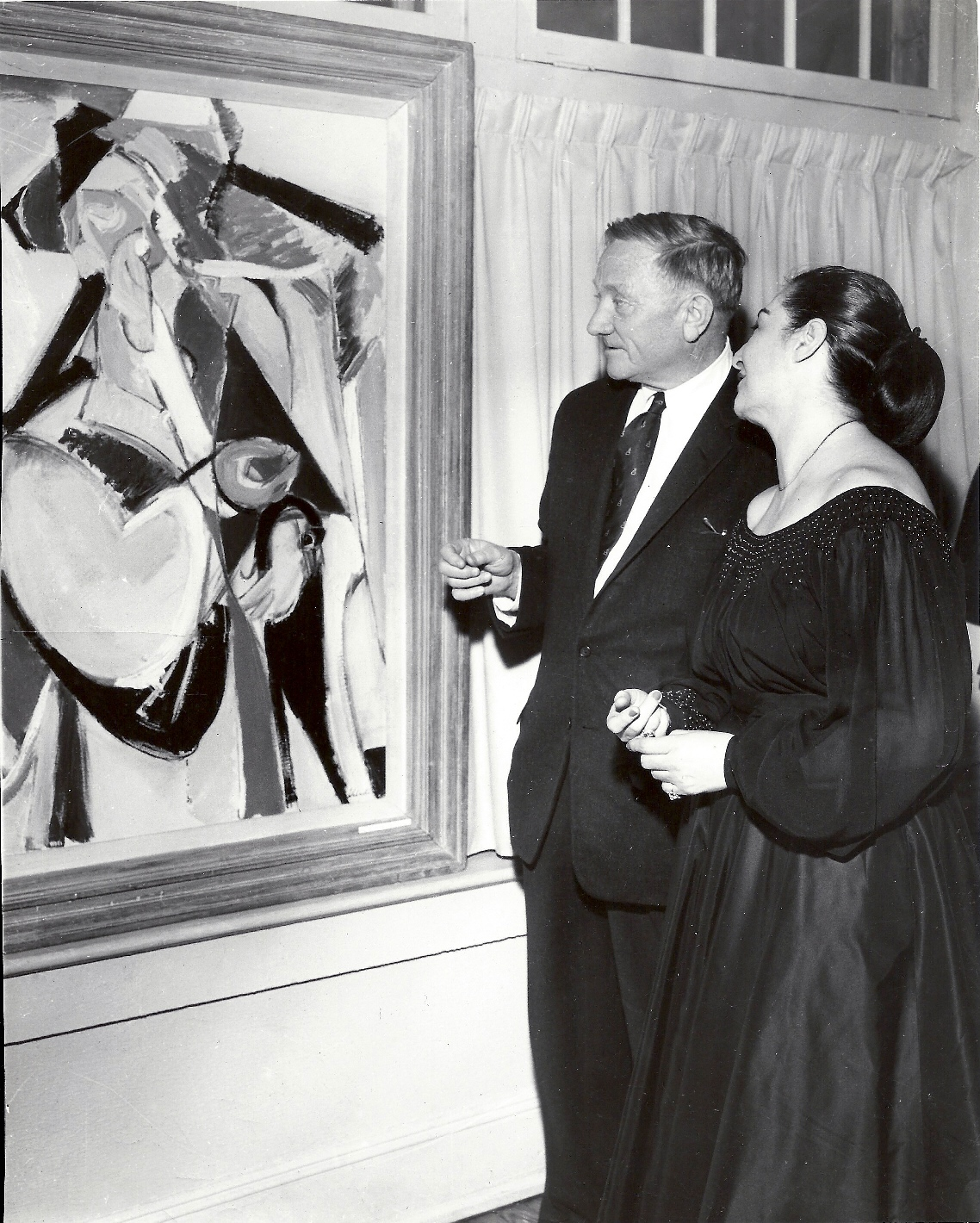
Supreme Court Justice William O. Douglas with Anna Walinska at the opening of her exhibition at the Gres Art Gallery, Washington, DC, 1958

Anna Walinska (September 8, 1906 – December 19, 1997) was an American painter. She is known for her colorful works of the Modernist period, collages done with handmade Burmese Shan paper, and a large body of works in various media on the theme of the Holocaust. Works by Walinska are included in numerous public collections, most notably the National Portrait Gallery, the National Museum of Women in the Arts, the Smithsonian American Art Museum, the United States Holocaust Memorial Museum, the Rose Art Museum at Brandeis University, the Denver Art Museum, The Jewish Museum in New York, the Herbert F. Johnson Museum of Art at Cornell, the Zimmerli Art Museum at Rutgers University, the Judah L. Magnes Museum in Berkeley, and Yad Vashem. Walinska's scrapbooks of the Guild Art Gallery, along with sketchbooks and journals on world travel are included in the Archives of American Art at the Smithsonian Institution.

== Early life and education ==
Born in London, Walinska was the daughter of labor leader Ossip Walinsky and sculptor-poet-activist Rosa Newman Walinska.

She enrolled at the Art Students League in 1918 at the age of 12.

In 1926, Walinska went to Paris to study with Andre Lhote and exhibited at the Salon des Independents. She lived around the corner from Gertrude Stein, sketched Picasso in a cafe and befriended Poulenc and Schoenberg.

== Career ==
Back in New York, in 1935 Walinska became an exhibit curator for the Federal Art Project and founded the Guild Art Gallery at 37 West 57th Street, where she gave Arshile Gorky his first New York solo show. When Walinska's work was exhibited alongside Gorky at the Guild, ARTnews reviewed the show and chose a painting by Walinska as the illustration.

In 1937, Walinska was represented in the American Artists' Congress first annual membership exhibition. Subsequent group shows included: Artists for Victory, Metropolitan Museum of Art, 1942; Paintings of the Year, 1946, National Academy of Design; Recent Drawings USA, Museum of Modern Art, 1956; Baltimore Museum of Art (with Fernando Botero and Wifredo Lam), 1959. Her work was shown at the Bodley Gallery, the Monede Gallery, Buecker & Harpsichords, and in numerous exhibitions in the U.S., the U.K., and France with the National Association of Women Artists, the Federation of Modern Painters and Sculptors, and the Silvermine Guild. her work was included in the American Federation of Arts exhibition titled "God & Man in Art," which toured the U.S. in 1958.

From 1954 to 1955, Walinska journeyed around the world by herself on prop planes, keeping a diary which is now in the collection of the Smithsonian Archives of American Art. The six-month trip began in New York City and continued to Honolulu, Tokyo, Hong Kong, Bangkok, Burma, New Delhi, Karachi, Cyprus, Israel, Istanbul, Athens, Rome, Perugia, Florence, Venice, Pompei, Naples, Sorrento, Capri, Nice, Barcelona, Madrid, Toledo, Lisbon, and finally to Bermuda, where she noted in her diary that the single room rate at the Elbow Beach Surf Club ran from $14–25.

The high point of the trip was a four-month sojourn in Burma, where her brother Louis Walinsky was serving as economic advisor to Prime Minister U Nu. While in Burma, Walinska instructed local craftsmen on the art of building an easel and stretching canvas. The Burmese artists took her out to paint en plein air, and she shared with them her knowledge of what was happening in the art world. U Hla Shein, Minister of the Shan States and an artist himself, wrote of her influence in The Guardian: "The vast majority of artists in Burma follow the realistic approach. They have now for the first time seen and heard a modernist, who appears entirely different from the only brand they had known." While in Burma, she painted the portrait of Prime Minister U Nu.

Later, Walinska became a teaching artist in residence at the Riverside Museum (then located at the Master Apartments), where she exhibited with sculptor Louise Nevelson, among others. In 1971 the Riverside collection, including two of her paintings, moved to the Rose Art Museum at Brandeis University.

Walinska created a large body of work on the theme of the Holocaust, some of which were included in her one-woman retrospective at the Jewish Museum in 1957. They were subsequently shown as a group of 122 works at the Museum of Religious Art at the Cathedral of St. John the Divine in a 1979 retrospective. Posthumously, Walinska's Holocaust work was shown in Eastern Europe for the first time in 2000, at the Ghetto Museum at the Theresienstadt Memorial in the Czech Republic. Works from this group went on to the permanent collections of the United States Holocaust Memorial Museum, Yad Vashem in Israel, the Clark University Center for Holocaust and Genocide Studies, the Judah L. Magnes Museum, and elsewhere.

In 2015, Walinska began to receive posthumous recognition, with exhibitions in East Hampton and New York City.

Walinska's work was auctioned for the first time in March 2017 by Weschler's in Washington, DC.
