= Arshile Gorky =

Armenian-American painter (1904–1948)

- Արշիլ Գորկի
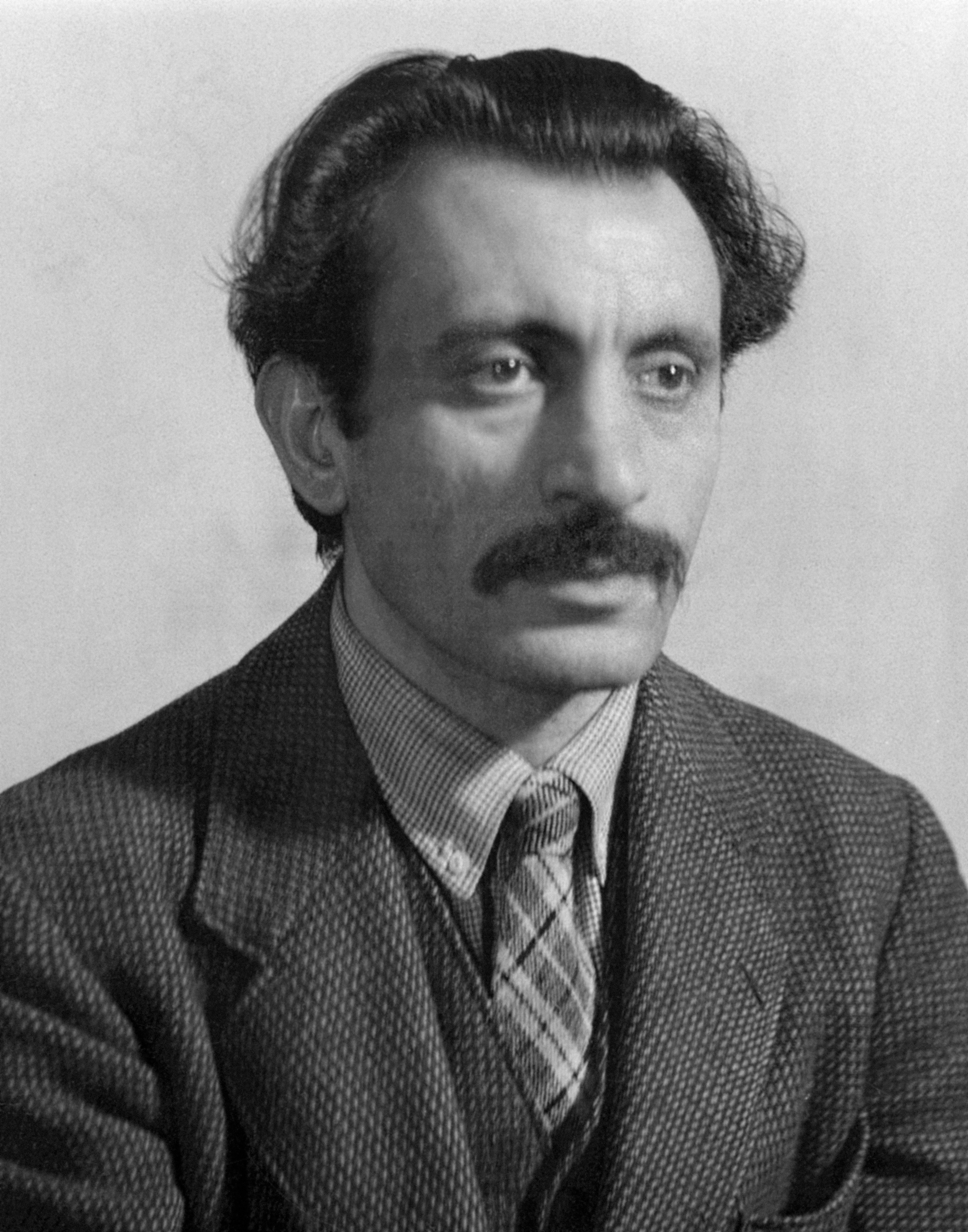
- Gorky in 1936
- Born: Vostanik Manoug Adoian; April 15, 1904; Khorgom, Vilayet of Van, Ottoman Empire
- Died: July 21, 1948 (aged 44); Sherman, Connecticut, U.S.
- Known for: Painting, drawing
- Notable work: Landscape in the Manner of Cézanne (1927); The Artist and His Mother (1926-1936); Nighttime, Enigma, Nostalgia (1930–1934); Scent of Apricots on the Fields (1944); The Liver Is the Cock's Comb (1944)
- Movement: Abstract Expressionism

Arshile Gorky (/ˈɑːrʃiːl ˈɡɔːrki/ AR-sheel GOR-kee; born Vostanik Manoug Adoian, Armenian: Ոստանիկ Մանուկ Ատոյեան; April 15, 1904 – July 21, 1948) was an Armenian-American painter. At first influenced by Impressionism and Post-Impressionism, Gorky's later work presaged and exerted a seminal influence on abstract expressionism. Along with Mark Rothko, Jackson Pollock, and Willem de Kooning, Gorky has been hailed as one of the most powerful American painters of the 20th century. Gorky's experience as a survivor of the Armenian genocide had a crucial influence on his work.

== Early life ==
Vostanik Adoian was born in the village of Khorgom, situated on the shores of Lake Van in the Ottoman Empire (modern-day Turkey). His birthdate is often cited as April 15, 1904, but the year might have been 1902 or 1903. Toward the end of his life, he was particularly vague about his date of birth, changing it from year to year.

In 1908, his father emigrated to the United States to avoid the draft, leaving his family behind in the town of Van. In 1915, Gorky fled Van amidst the Armenian genocide and escaped with his mother and three sisters into Russian-controlled territory. In the aftermath of the genocide, his mother died of starvation in Yerevan in 1919. Arriving in America in 1920, at the age of 16, Gorky was reunited with his father, but they never grew close. He settled in Providence, Rhode Island.

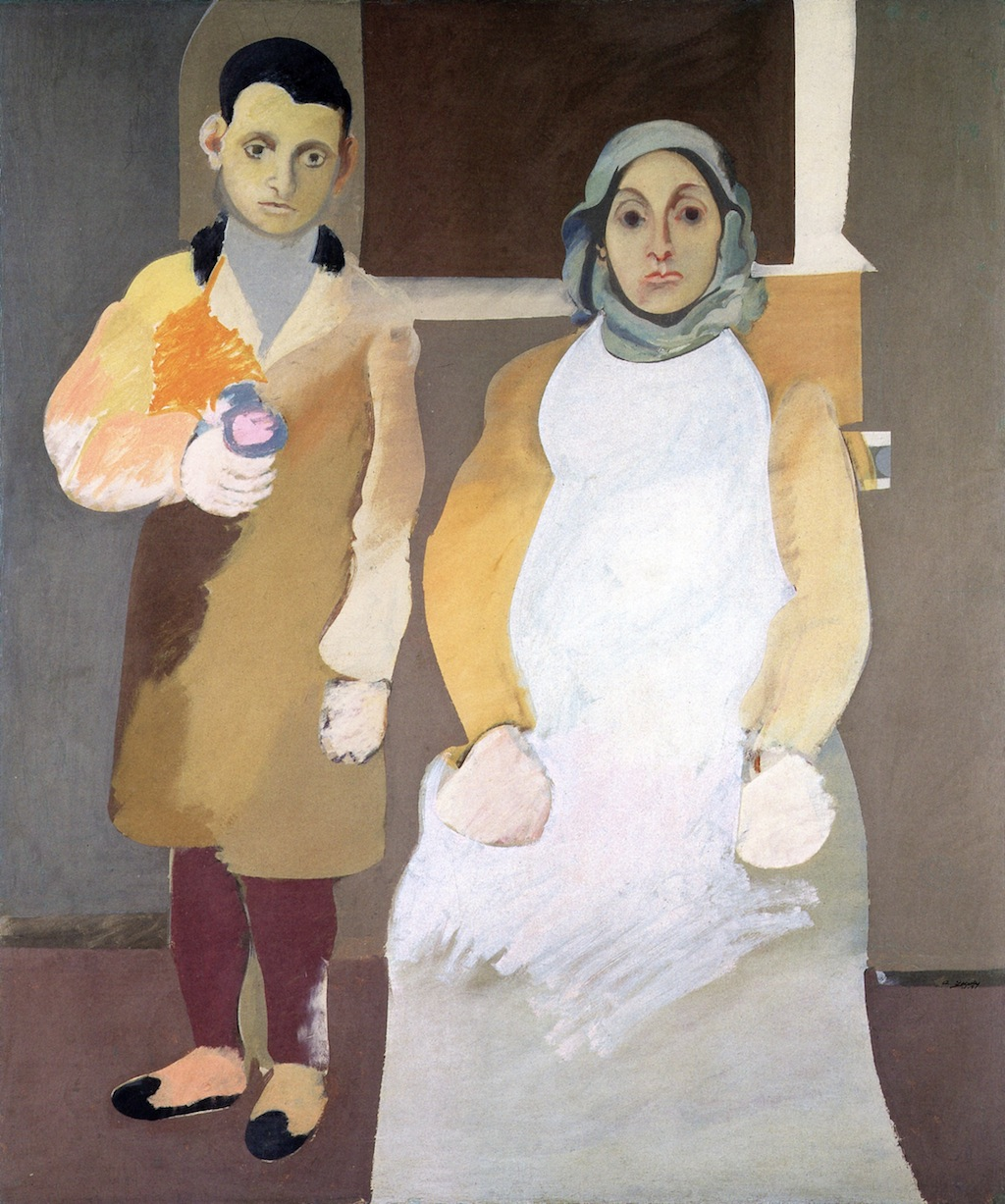
Arshile Gorky's The Artist and His Mother (c. 1926–1936), Whitney Museum of American Art, New York City.

In the process of reinventing his identity, he changed his name to "Arshile Gorky", declaring to be a Georgian noble (taking the Georgian name Arshile/Archil), and even telling people that he was a relative of the Russian writer Maxim Gorky.

== Career ==
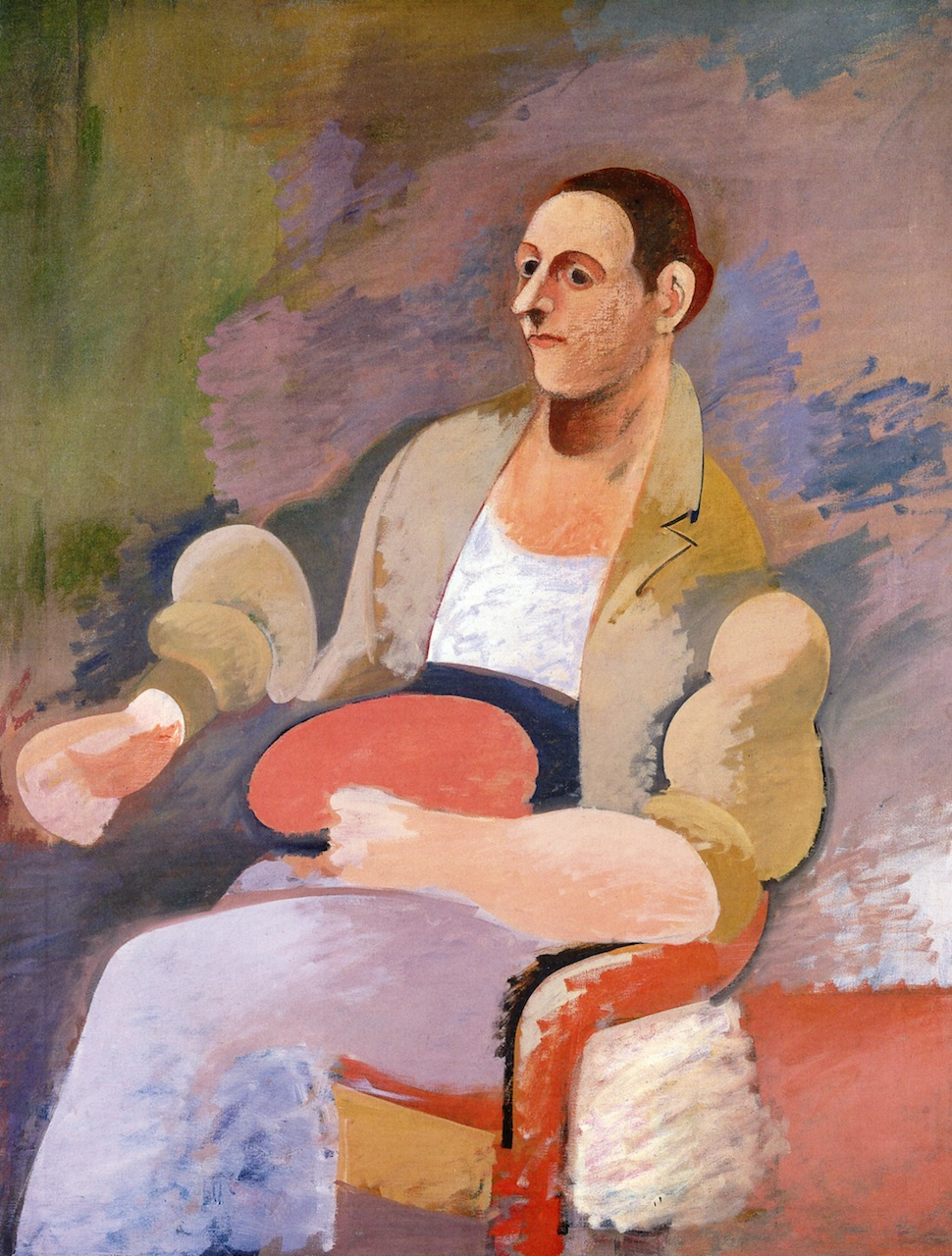
Arshile Gorky's Portrait of Master Bill, 1929–1936. Oil on canvas.

In 1923, Gorky enrolled in the recently founded New England School of Art in Boston, eventually becoming a part-time instructor. During the early 1920s he was influenced by Impressionism, although later in the decade he produced works that were more Post-Impressionism. During this time he was living in New York and was influenced by Paul Cézanne. In 1925, he was asked by Edmund Greacen of the Grand Central Art Galleries to teach at the Grand Central School of Art; Gorky accepted and remained with them until 1931. His notable students included Revington Arthur.

In 1927, Gorky met Ethel Schwabacher, with whom he developed a lifelong friendship. Schwabacher was his first biographer. Gorky said:

The stuff of thought is the seed of the artist. Dreams form the bristles of the artist's brush. As the eye functions as the brain's sentry, I communicate my innermost perceptions through the art, my worldview.

In 1931, Gorky sent a group of works ranging in price from $100 to $450 to the Downtown Gallery in New York. The artist's name was spelled "Archele Gorki" in the gallery's records; most of Gorky's works from this period were unsigned. The exact nature of their relationship is unknown. Mrs. John D. Rockefeller (Abby Aldrich Rockefeller) purchased from the gallery a Cézannesque still life by Gorky titled Fruit. Gorky may have been introduced to the gallery owner by Stuart Davis, who regularly exhibited there.

In 1935, Gorky became one of the first artists employed by the Works Progress Administration Federal Art Project. This later came to include such artists as Alice Neel, Lee Krasner, Jackson Pollock, Diego Rivera and Mark Rothko.

In 1935, Gorky signed a three-year contract with the Guild Art Gallery (37 West Fifty-seventh Street, New York). Co-owned by Anna Walinska and Margaret Lefranc, but funded and directed by Lefranc, the gallery organized the artist's first solo exhibition in New York, Abstract Drawings by Arshile Gorky.

Notable paintings from this time include Landscape in the Manner of Cézanne (1927) and Landscape, Staten Island (1927–1928). At the close of the 1920s and into the 1930s he experimented with cubism, eventually moving to surrealism. The painting illustrated above, The Artist and His Mother (ca. 1926–1936), is a memorable, moving and innovative portrait. His The Artist and His Mother paintings are based on a childhood photograph taken in Van in which he is depicted standing beside his mother. Gorky made two versions; the other is in the National Gallery of Art in Washington, D.C. The painting has been likened to Ingres for simplicity of line and smoothness, to Egyptian funerary art for pose, to Cézanne for flat planar composition, to Picasso for form and color.

Nighttime, Enigma, Nostalgia (1930–1934) are the series of complex works that characterize this phase of his painting. The canvas Portrait of Master Bill appears to depict Gorky's friend, Willem de Kooning. De Kooning said: "I met a lot of artists – but then I met Gorky ... He had an extraordinary gift for hitting the nail on the head; remarkable. So I immediately attached myself to him and we became very good friends. It was nice to be foreigners meeting in some new place." However recent publications contradict the claim that the painting is of de Kooning but is actually a portrait of a Swedish carpenter Gorky called "Master Bill", who did some work for him in exchange for Gorky giving him art lessons.

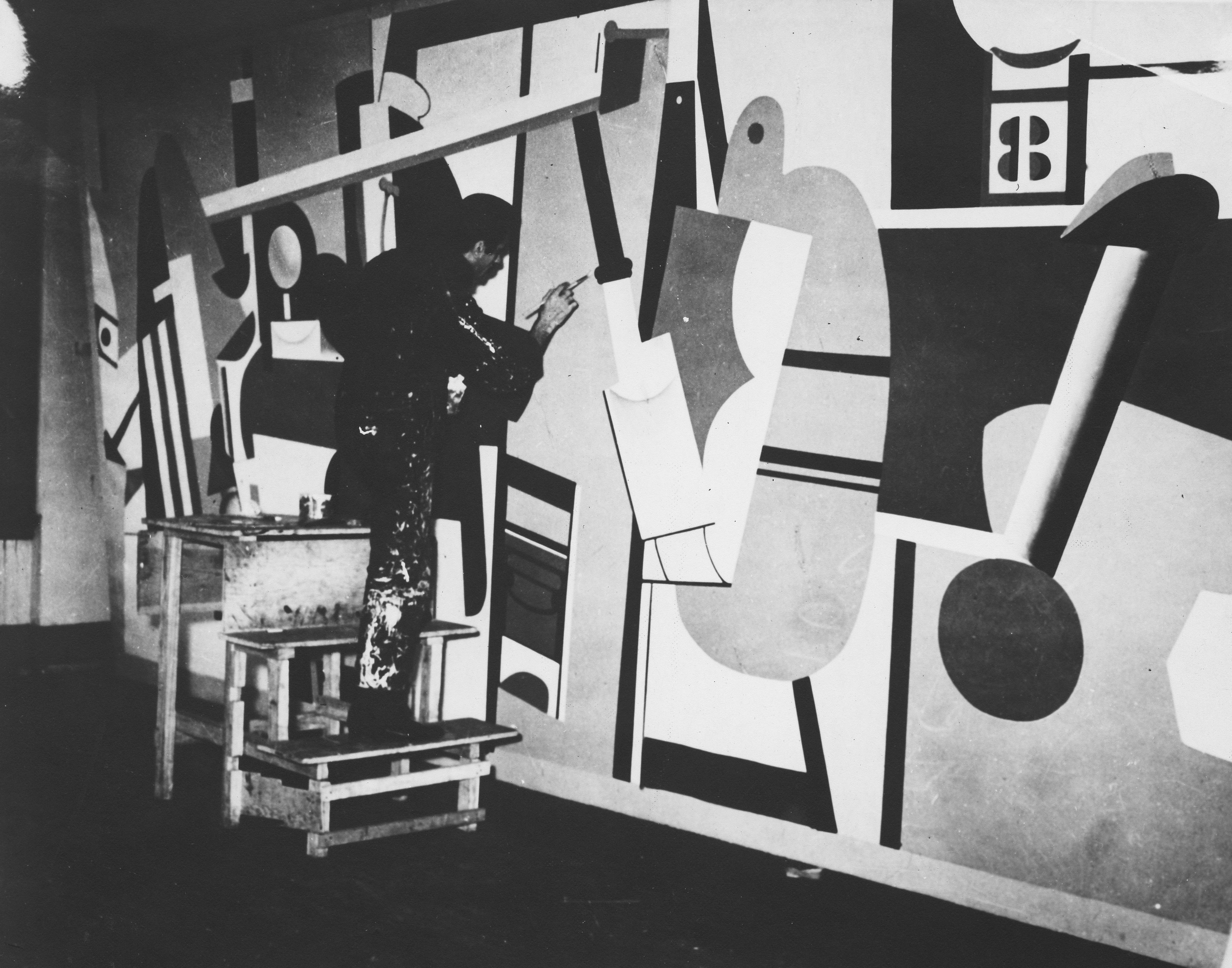
Arshile Gorky working on Activities on the field, one of the panels for his mural Aviation at Newark Airport, for the Federal Art Project, 1936

When Gorky showed his new work to André Breton in the 1940s, after seeing the new paintings and in particular The Liver Is the Cock's Comb, Breton declared the painting to be "one of the most important paintings made in America" and Gorky a Surrealist. The painting was shown in the Surrealists' final show at the Galérie Maeght in Paris in 1947.

Michael Auping, a curator at the Modern Art Museum in Fort Worth, saw in the work a "taut sexual drama" combined with nostalgic allusions to Gorky's Armenian past. The work in 1944 shows his emergence in the 1940s from the influence of Cézanne and Picasso into his own style, and is perhaps his greatest work. It is over six feet high and eight feet wide, depicting "an abstract landscape filled with watery plumes of semi-transparent color that coalesce around spiky, thorn like shapes, painted in thin, sharp black lines, as if to suggest beaks and claws."

== Personal life ==
Artist Corinne Michelle West was Gorky's muse and probably his lover, although she refused to marry him when he proposed several times.

In 1941, Gorky met and married Agnes Ethel Magruder (1921–2013), daughter of Admiral John Holmes Magruder, Jr. (1889–1963). Gorky soon nicknamed her "Mougouch", an Armenian term of endearment. They had two daughters, Maro and Natasha. Maro Gorky became a painter, and married the British sculptor and writer Matthew Spender, son of the poet Sir Stephen Spender.

From 1946, Gorky suffered a series of crises: his studio barn burned down (destroying his library and thirty of his paintings), he underwent a colostomy for cancer, and Mougouch had an affair with Roberto Matta. In 1948, Gorky's neck was broken and his painting arm temporarily paralyzed in a car accident, and his wife left him, taking their children with her. She later married British writer Xan Fielding.

On July 21, 1948, after telling a neighbor and one of his students that he planned to commit suicide, Gorky was found hanged in his studio. On a nearby wooden crate he had written "Goodbye My Loveds". He is buried in North Cemetery in Sherman, Connecticut.

== Legacy ==
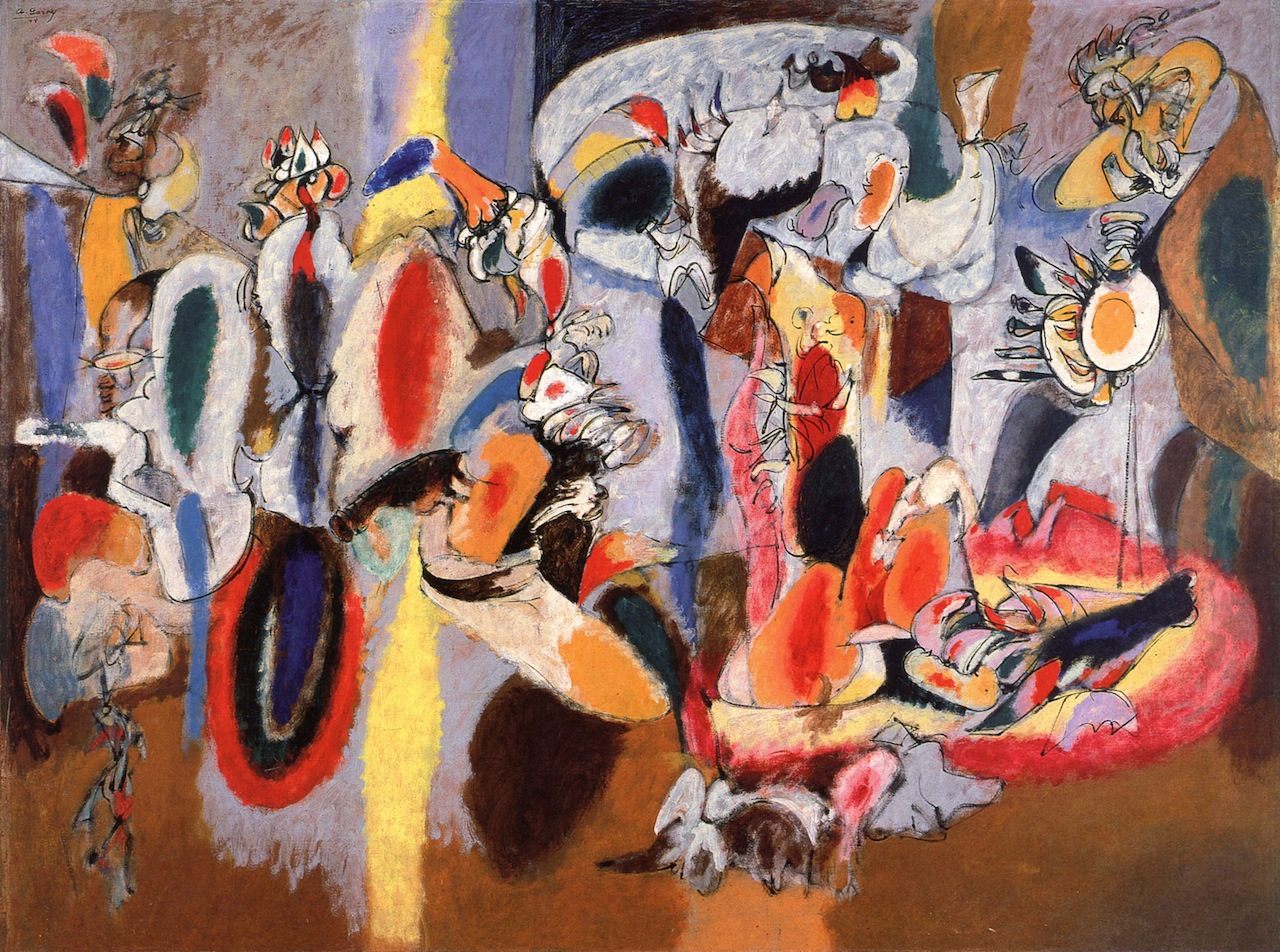
Arshile Gorky. The Liver is the Cock's Comb (1944), oil on canvas, 73 1/4 in × 98 in (186 cm × 249 cm), Albright–Knox Art Gallery, Buffalo, New York. The painting represents the peak of Gorky's achievement and his individual style, after he had emerged from the influence of Cézanne and Picasso.

Gorky's lyrical abstraction was a "new language" which "lit the way for two generations of American artists". The painterly spontaneity of mature works like The Liver is the Cock's Comb (1944), One Year the Milkweed (1944), and The Betrothal II (1947) immediately prefigured abstract expressionism, and leaders in the New York School acknowledged Gorky's considerable influence. Gorky had a distinct, signature style and was known for his draftsmanship. He used twisted but elegant lines to bring in 'biomorphic' forms in his abstract paintings along with an overlay of colours to create a complex landscape of lines and colours on the canvas.

His oeuvre synthesizes Surrealism and the sensuous color and painterliness of the School of Paris with his own highly personal formal vocabulary. His paintings and drawings are held by museums in the United States including the National Gallery of Art, the Museum of Modern Art, the Art Institute of Chicago, the Metropolitan Museum of Art, the Jordan Schnitzer Museum of Art in Eugene, Oregon, and the Whitney Museum, and in many worldwide, including the Tate in London.

A selection of Gorky's letters were translated and published by Karlen Mooradian in Arshile Gorky Adoian and The Many Worlds of Arshile Gorky in 1980. Matthew Spender (1999) and Nouritza Matossian (2000) concluded from their research that the translations of Gorky's letters to his younger sister, Vartoosh, published by her son, Mooradian, had been embellished and some of these letters were fabricated by Mooradian. The most accurate translations of Gorky's letters to family and friends were published at Goats on the Roof: A Life in Letters and Documents (2009), edited by Spender with translations by Father Krikor Maksoudian.

Fifteen of Gorky's paintings and drawings were destroyed in the crash of American Airlines Flight 1 in 1962.

In June 2005, the family of the artist established the Arshile Gorky Foundation, a not-for-profit corporation formed to further the public's appreciation and understanding of the life and artistic achievements of Gorky. The foundation is working on a catalogue raisonné of the artist's entire body of work. In October 2009, the foundation relaunched its website to provide accurate information on the artist, including a biography, bibliography, exhibition history, and list of archival sources.

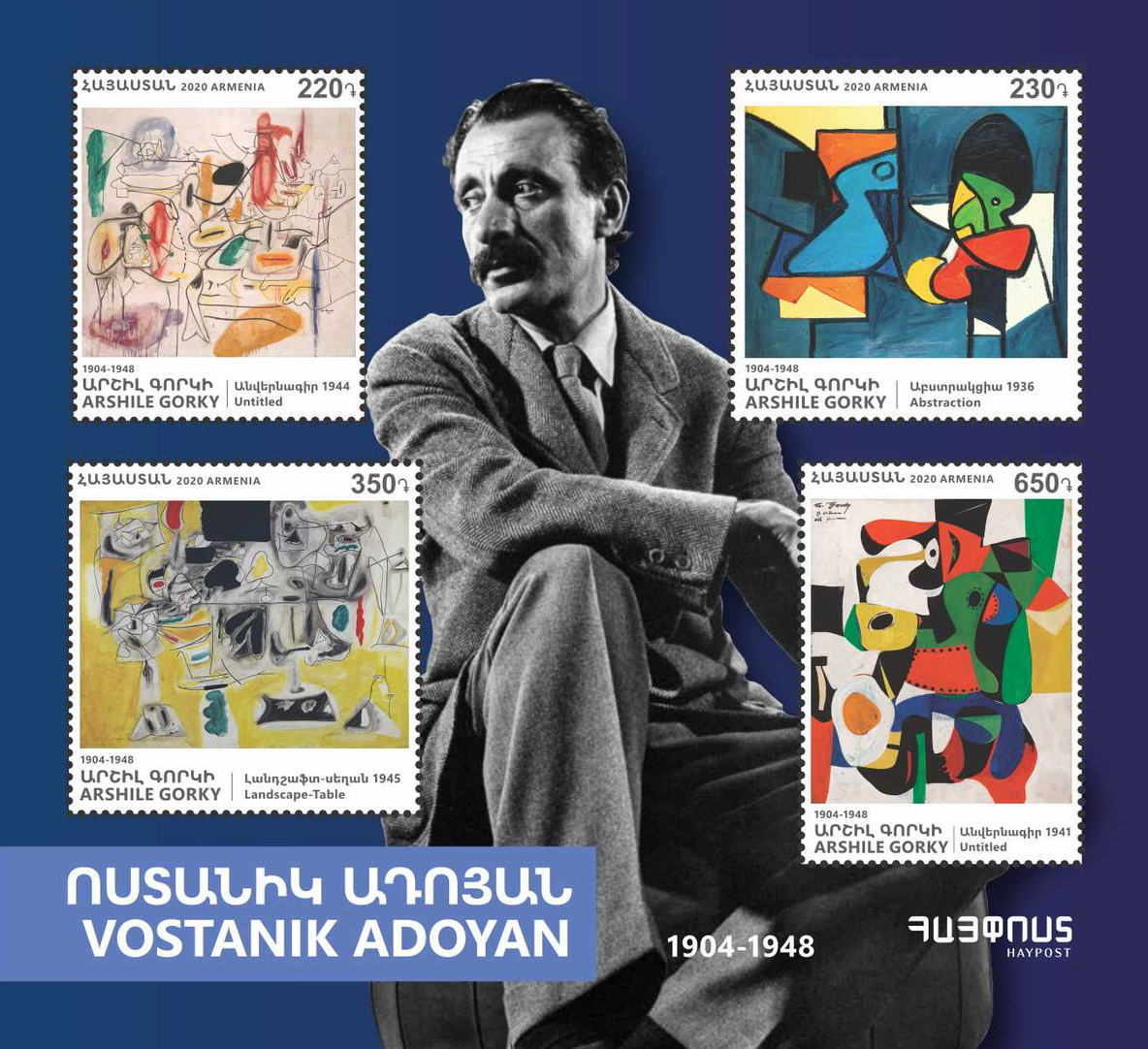
A 2020 stamp sheet of Armenia featuring Gorky and his paintings Untitled (1944), Abstraction (1936), Landscape-Table (1945) and Untitled (1941)

Without Gorky is a documentary film about the artist, made by Cosima Spender, his granddaughter.

In October 2009, the Philadelphia Museum of Art held the exhibition Arshile Gorky: A Retrospective. On June 6, 2010, an exhibition of the same name opened at the Museum of Contemporary Art, Los Angeles. In 2021, during routine maintenance of "The Limit", a hidden painting was discovered underneath; both paintings were exhibited and included in the latest catalogue of his work.

In 2015, a fountain monument commemorating Gorky was erected in Edremit, Turkey, near his birthplace. After the local People's Democratic Party government was replaced by appointees of the ruling Justice and Development Party, the water supply to the fountain was cut off, the taps were broken off, and signs with Gorky's biography in Armenian, Kurdish, English, and Turkish were removed from the monument.

Gorky's estate has been represented by Hauser & Wirth since 2016. It previously worked with Gagosian Gallery.

In October 2023, a potential work by Gorky, partially covered in white household paint by the artist himself, was the subject of an episode in the BBC art history series Fake or Fortune?.

== Bibliography ==
- Herrera, Hayden (2005). Arshile Gorky: His Life and Work. New York City: Farrar, Straus and Giroux. ISBN 0-374-11323-8.
