= Hresk =

Agrotown in Minsk Region, Belarus

Hresk Грэск (Belarusian) Греск (Russian)
- Agrotown
- Location within Belarus
- Coordinates: 53°09′59″N 27°29′32″E
- Country: Belarus
- Region: Minsk Region
- District: Slutsk District
- Time zone: UTC+3 (MSK)

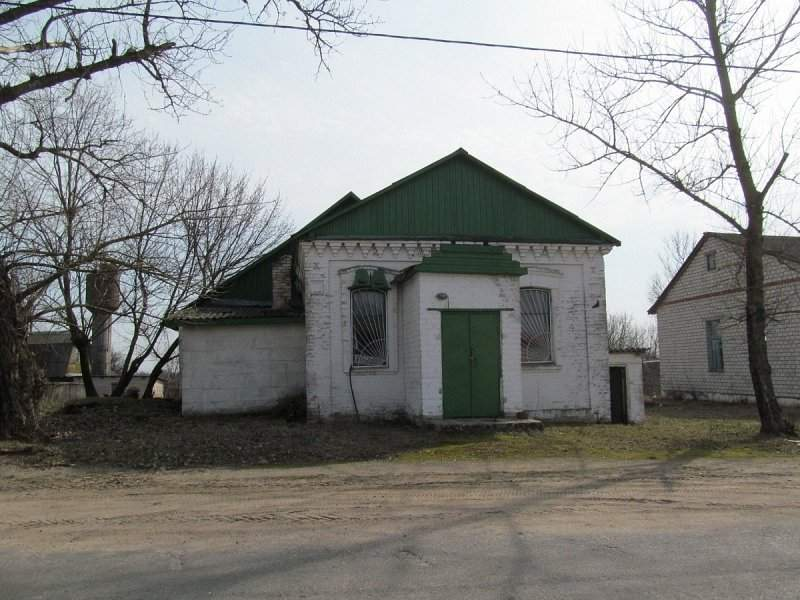
Building in Hresk

Hresk (Belarusian: Грэск; Russian: Греск, romanized: Gresk; Polish: Hresk) is an agrotown in Slutsk District, Minsk Region, Belarus. It is the administrative center of Hretski rural council.

== History ==
Within the Grand Duchy of Lithuania, Hresk was part of the Principality of Slutsk, itself a part of Nowogródek Voivodeship. In 1793, Hresk was acquired by the Russian Empire in the course of the Second Partition of Poland. It became a part of the Slutsky Uyezd of Minsk Governorate.

During World War II, Hresk was under German occupation from 27 June 1941 until 1 July 1944.
