= Margaret Lefranc =

American painter, illustrator, and editor (1907–1998)

- Born: Margaret Anglin Frankel; March 15, 1907; Brooklyn, New York, U.S.
- Died: September 5, 1998 (aged 91); Santa Fe, New Mexico, U.S.
- Occupation: Modernist painter

Margaret Lefranc (nee Frankel; later Schoonover) (March 15, 1907 – September 5, 1998) was an American painter, illustrator and editor, an American Modernist with early training as a color expressionist. Lefranc produced portraits, figures, florals, still lifes and landscapes in a variety of compositions. Her media included oil, watercolor, gouache, pastel, drawing, etching and monotypes. At age eighteen, she received accolades from Alfred Stieglitz and, in November 1928, aged twenty-two, received rave reviews in La Revue Moderne, when her works Dancer and Mme M. en Pyjama were shown in Paris.

== Early life ==
Margaret Lefranc was born in Brooklyn, New York, to Abraham Frankel and Sophie Tiplitz Frankel, immigrants from Moscow and Tbilisi, respectively. During their marriage, Abraham owned a shirt factory, a shipping line, distributed Western films, built the Lowe's theater in Brooklyn, owned other real estate and was the first person to have a small orchestra in vaudeville. They had four children, but one son died. They spent summers in Hunter, New York, at a farmhouse built in 1776 which Abraham purchased. Lefranc was often in poor health which made it difficult for her to attend school regularly.

Lefranc was the youngest child and at the age of six, she decided to become an artist. The Brooklyn home inspired her young artistic inclinations with colorful medallions and portraits of famous people on the library ceiling and a print of Rosa Bonheur's Horse Fair on a wall. Eventually her mother, tired from housekeeping, talked Abe into moving into two suites at the Hotel Pennsylvania located in Manhattan. Margaret spent a lot of time alone when she wasn't in the hands of a caregiver.

== Early education and Berlin ==
In New York City, Lefranc attended Adelphi Academy and Hunter College Model School. At the age of twelve and living at the Pennsylvania Hotel, she was chauffeured to her formal classes at the New York's Art Students League where she attended for three or four hours. She worked in charcoal drawing reproductions.

Abe's shipping business closed with the beginning of World War I, when one of his tankers was torpedoed by the Germans and the survivors were shot in their lifeboats. Abe was commissioned by the U. S. Government to scrap the German fleet, and the girl's parents moved to Germany but left the children in the U.S.

Celeste, the elder, who was nine years older and married, looked after Margaret. Lefranc finished the last few months in school, and at the age of thirteen, traveled by freighter to join her parents in Berlin where she contracted rheumatic fever. She spent almost a year in bed, did not speak German until six months later, and, at that time, was not exposed to the widespread hardship in the city.

Abe built her a small studio on the roof of their apartment building where Margaret drew in charcoals under the tutelage of a young art student who eventually told her parents to leave her alone and let her develop on her own. Once he brought an old woman he had met on the street to pose by Lefranc's bedside for a small amount of money. Lefranc was aware that the money from the sketch would allow the woman to buy some food. When Lefranc was well, she took classes in charcoal drawing and charcoal portraits at "Kunstschule des Westens", the School of the West. After a year in Berlin, the Frankel's moved to Paris.

== Paris, 1922 to 1932 ==
Returning to New York, to renew her passport, aged eighteen, Lefranc was introduced by Claude Bragdon, a close friend her sister, to Georgia O'Keeffe and Alfred Stieglitz. Stieglitz looked at her art very seriously and said, "Young lady, you're very gifted. But you are also very French. Come back after you've lived in America for ten years."

In Paris, Lefranc became interested in contemporary developments. She saw the works of Marc, Kollwitz, Lehmbruck, Heckel and other artists of Die Brücke, Paul Klee and Wassily Kandinsky. She loved the great old masters, but it was the modernists, particularly Lovis Corinth, who stimulated her profoundly. She practiced the use of light and shadow in the development, on a two-dimensional surface, of forms in a three dimensional space. Diane Armitage, freelance writer and digital video artist, wrote about one of the artist's self-portraits, "Lefranc appears to have 'come into her own' early on when faced with the prospect of confronting a 'persona'…by the way of realist techniques which slid into abstraction…she was able to incorporate some of the 'isms' of the day."

Lefranc studied at the Académie de la Grande Chaumière, the Russian Academy, "Academy Russe in Paris". Her teachers included Basil Tchoukaieff, Antoine Bourdelle and Charles Bissiere. With André Lhote, she learned how to apply paint to create flat, dryly handled planes of color, inspired by Cubism, and also more literal descriptive passages. Lefranc struggled with her signature signing "MF" then "FRA" and also "Frankel". When she was older she graduated to signing "Lefranc". Lefranc returned to New York in 1932, and seven years later exhibited in the 1939 World's Fair in Flushing, New York. But her first task was to save the family's 1776 farmhouse from the courthouse steps in Hunter, New York, and set about repairing it.

She immediately set up the Hunter Colony and invited her young friends she had met when teaching art at Camp Allegro: Felice Swados and her future husband, Richard Hofstadter, and their friends, all who paid a stipend and spent summers working on projects whether painting, music, a thesis, or a book. Lefranc painted portraits including her own, the apple orchard and other landscapes. A portrait of Felice Swados typing her book, House of Fury, while sitting in an evening gown in Lefranc's apple orchard, now resides in the library of St. John's College in Santa Fe, New Mexico, along with the Swados book. As Susan Ressler, author, noted, "Lefranc's portraits are unflinching in their honesty and often experiment with abstract form. Her landscapes seem gentler and more empathic…reveling in the beauty and the wonder of the West."

Clifton Fadiman, author, radio and television personality and Lefranc's brother-in-law's brother, dubbed the artist "Ur" Hippie. Lefranc's next door neighbors were Betty Comden (Mrs. Steve) and Betty's working partner for many musicals, Adolph Green. There was a mutual sharing of parties, in Lefranc's swimming pool and Comden's tennis court. Also, frequenting were Leonard Bernstein, Judy Holliday and others interested in the theater.

== Guild Art Gallery, 1935-37 ==
In 1934-35, Lefranc was a guest of Rene d'Harnoncourt on the Art in America radio programs speaking about American and European art. During that time Lefranc decided to fund, open and direct an art gallery for gifted Americans located on the fifth floor of Thirty-seven West Fifty-Seventh Street. The Guild served as the launch site for Arshile Gorky with his first New York one-man exhibition.

When he was starving, Lefranc also fed him at Lüchow's Restaurant. She released him from his contract when Julien Levy promised Gorky an income of twenty-five dollars a month, which she couldn't match, plus exhibitions. Levy did give him $700, but an exhibition didn't occur until 1944, almost nine years later.

Lefranc also represented the sculptor Chaim Gross, Saul Baiserman, Theodore Roszak, Ary Stillman, Jean Liberte, Lloyd Raymond Ney, Donald Forbes, Philip Reisman, Max Weber, Yasuo Kuniyoshi and many others. On vacations and on weekends Lefranc painted five paintings a day in Hunter, often the subject of her work during those years, including self-portraits because, as Lefranc said, "I was the cheapest model I could find."

Lefranc closed the gallery in 1937. In 1980, Lefranc was asked to contribute her papers of the Guild Art Gallery to the Archives of American Art, Smithsonian.

== Taos, New Mexico, Summer 1939 ==
In 1939 Lefranc took a trip with her friend, the photographer Annette Stevens Rada to Florida, then travelled on to Texas and north to Las Vegas and finally to Taos, New Mexico to visit her friends, Dr. Rudolph and Majorie Kieve. Through the Kieve's, Lefranc met Frieda Lawrence and rented a townhouse from her. At the same time, having been apprised by Thomas Mann of the arrival of his son-in-law in Taos, the Kieves met W. H. Auden and Chester Kallman at the bus station in the center of the village. Auden was traveling as tutor and paid companion to Kallman.

Auden insisted on accompanying Lefranc to California. It was a journey and vacation Lefranc would never forget. She wrote about Frieda Lawrence, Auden and Kallman, Witter Bynner and others in an article published in 1992 and later serialized. Before she left Taos, Lefranc promised Frieda Lawrence that when she had one thousand dollars saved, she would return to live in New Mexico.

== New York, 1939-45 ==
The years from 1939 to 1945 were disappointing for Lefranc. Mixed in with the vacation to Taos, Lefranc assisted in her family's real estate investments, worked as a textile designer and stylist (1938-1944); and served on the staff of the Cooper Union Museum (1944-1945). She also met and lived with Raymond Elton Schoonover, a book store owner of Dutch descent, for a year. Though he was thirteen years her junior, they married in 1942 and divorced in 1945.

At Cooper Union, Lefranc, now known as Margaret Schoonover, had been hired as a curator, but that never came to fruition. Lefranc did, however, arrange exhibitions for the art students upstairs. Lefranc also donated several of her own works of art to the museum. "During my vacations and every weekend that I could, I returned to Hunter to paint. In November 1945 when the war had ended, I trained three people to take over my job at Cooper Union, which I thought was terribly funny."

By the time she left Cooper Union, Lefranc had already met Alice Marriott, author and anthropologist, who had come to New York in 1940 to help to set up the landmark American Indian Exhibition at the Museum of Modern Art, along with Rene d'Harnoncourt, Mary and Frederic Douglas and Kent Fisher. Lefranc had already met D'Hornoncourt when guesting on his Art in America radio program. D'Harnoncourt, Frederic "Eric" Douglas and Alice Marriott were all friends. Margaret joined the group soon afterwards when Dr. Rudy Kieve wrote a letter of introduction for Marriott to present to Margaret when Marriott was in New York. After that, friendships continued by correspondence and then vacations.

1945 was a busy year. Once Lefranc realized that her husband wouldn't change his rambunctious nature, she placed all of his belongings on the apartment landing, called him to retrieve them, rented out the apartment, divorced him on June 19, 1945, then escaped from family and former husband and went West by invitation of Alice Marriott when she said, "Why don't you come out West to live?...We can arrange to work together."

Marriott had received a Rockefeller Foundation grant to study the Indian potters of San Ildefonso Pueblo, near Nambe and Santa Fe, New Mexico. The war was over, so Lefranc decided to give it a trial for six months, team up with Marriott and paint as much as she could in the Southwest.

== Nambe, New Mexico, 1945-55 ==
Lefranc arrived in Santa Fe in her old 1935 Dodge to disruptive events. Plans had changed due to Marriott's explosive temper directed toward the owner of two casitas. Lefranc and Marriott were suddenly homeless as it was the end of World War II, and the Los Alamos National Laboratory had swallowed all rental property in and around the area. They did find an empty house in Nambe consisting of three small rooms in a row, each with a door to the outside. It looked exactly like a railroad car with a discreet privy fifty feet away. It had no heating, no water, no electricity and no furniture either. It was a life experience which Lefranc illustrated for Marriott in The Valley Below and a story detailed for Lois Katz, author, and for Sandra D'Emilio. In Nambe, Lefranc saw the spectacular distant sierras which she painted regularly along with other scenery. The lives of these two independent women were complicated with adventures and misadventures while attempting to produce art and books. It was full of Indian dances and socializing with neighbors of different languages and cultures. Lefranc completed Indian illustrations of pottery in the round (instead of the usual flat panel), portraits of Maria Martinez and her home life, illustrated and painted in oils Indian dances at the Pueblos as well as her Spanish neighbors and their environs. Also part of the time included trips to Oklahoma to meet with the University of Oklahoma Press in Norman regarding her illustrations for Maria: The Potter of San Ildefonso (still in print) and five other books. She also illustrated Alma Big Tree, a Kiowa Medicine Woman and traveled to Southern Cheyenne Reservation to paint an elder, Mary Inkanish, who was an expert on beadwork, which gouache was used as a frontispiece for one of Marriott's book.

Additional trips included Iowa, Wyoming, Montana and other states intermixed with her own exhibitions at the Museum of New Mexico, Santa Fe; the Philbrook Museum of Art, Tulsa Oklahoma; the Oklahoma Civic Center, Oklahoma City; and others. She collected pottery, assisted Marriott in establishing small historical museums set up in store fronts, and traveled for research and artifact gathering. A noted painter, illustrator, and editor, in 1948 Lefranc received a "Fifty Best Books of the Year" award from the Library of Congress in conjunction with the American Institute of Graphic Arts for her synoptic illustrations of pottery in Maria: The Potter of San Ildefonso; and in 1952 for Indians of the Four Corners, she was honored by the same organizations with a "One Hundred Best Books of the Year".

Eventually she was adopted by a Nambe Pueblo Indian medicine woman, Leonidas Romero y Vigil, and also later became trusted friends of Maria Martinez, Laura Gilpin, Georgia O'Keeffe, and many others which included her Spanish and Indian neighbors. As Lefranc explained to Diane Armitage, "When the Indians had a fight at the Pueblo, the elders came over one evening with a package and they handed it to me. Keep it for us. We're having a fight. This is our sacred fettish. We're afraid someone might try to steal it. I never opened it. I kept it for two years."

Lefranc illustrated several books written by Marriott:

- Dance Around the Sun, T.Y. Crowell, 1977
- Hell on Horses and Women, University of Oklahoma Press, 1953
- Indians of the Four Corners, T.Y. Crowell, 1952
- Maria: The Potter of San Ildefonso, University of Oklahoma Press, 1948
- The Valley Below, University of Oklahoma Press, 1948
- Indians on Horseback, T.Y. Crowell, 1948

In 1945 Lefranc bought property in Santa Fe, New Mexico. In 1954 she built a house at the same time when Marriott became indisposed and their thriving partnership broke apart. Lefranc eventually sold the Nambe house, and they went their separate ways, for which Marriott later expressed deep regret. Lefranc rented her house in Santa Fe until 1969 and moved to Florida to care for her ailing parents.

In 1956 Lefranc donated ninety-two pieces of pottery to what is now the Sam Noble Oklahoma Museum of Natural History, University of Oklahoma. Before the contribution, this collection Lefranc exhibited artistically on a rust colored adobe wall in Nambe in a new living room which she had just finished building when Georgia O'Keeffe and Maria Chabot arrived for tea. "Georgia walked in, didn't say a word, looked around very seriously and then turned to Maria and said, 'Why can't I have a room as beautiful as this.'

== Miami and Santa Fe, 1956-98 ==
Upon leaving Nambe in 1956, Lefranc moved to Miami, Florida to care for her parents. She assumed the management of their real estate, invested in the stock market and eventually bought the second oldest house in Coconut Grove which she restored. Lefranc successfully sold her art, and exhibited at various museums throughout the United States while taking classes at the University of Miami to see what the "youngsters" were doing. She even accompanied them to Yanhuitlan Oaxaca, Mexico.

There the artist abstracted the essence of figures by using blocky color forms to make up their shapes and thin brushstrokes to give the forms their figural presence. There were a number of paintings in gouache and casein on paper—portraits, fans, figures of female and male Indians, churches and street scenes. Until 1997 Lefranc continued to visit Santa Fe to make repairs on her home, to visit her adopted Indian family at the Nambe Pueblo, and to paint. She also traveled to the Hunter home in the Catskills which she still owned all and continued taking care of her parents and their interests. After her parents died during the 1960s, her traveling included Greece and a brief trip to Paris, but she mainly established a pattern of six months living in Miami and then Santa Fe and keeping up with her friends, Laura Gilpin, O'Keeffe, and others.

After Gilpin's death, Lefranc's life took a new turn with her business manager and companion's collaboration, Sandra McKenzie. McKenzie began cataloguing all of Lefranc's art first in Miami and then in Santa Fe, where McKenzie chauffeured the artist. In 1994, the artist and McKenzie formed the Margaret Lefranc Art Foundation to protect her art collection. First as Director, and later appointed President, McKenzie read and organized file drawers of newspaper articles, exhibition announcements, reviews, invitations, one-person and group exhibitions, and compiled all educational background and awards.

Any articles Lefranc had written, McKenzie found an audience. McKenzie nominated, unknown to Lefranc, and later Lefranc received the 1996 Governor's Award for Excellence and Achievement in the Arts, Painting, presented by Governor Gary Johnson and New Mexico's First Lady, Dee Johnson. Over the years, McKenzie captured eighty-five years of Lefranc's art history — a legacy of research preserved for the future including the first book, A Lifetime of Imaging: The Art of Margaret Lefranc, and then produced a film by the same name.

Defining Lefranc's art at this time were major exhibitions at the Governor's Gallery in Santa Fe, New Mexico, the Independent Spirits exhibition at the Autry National Center, Los Angeles, California, which traveled to other museums; and also the State Department's Breaking Boundaries, American Women Artists in France, exhibition in Paris.
