= The Liver Is the Cock's Comb =

1944 painting by Arshile Gorky

The Liver is the Cock's Comb
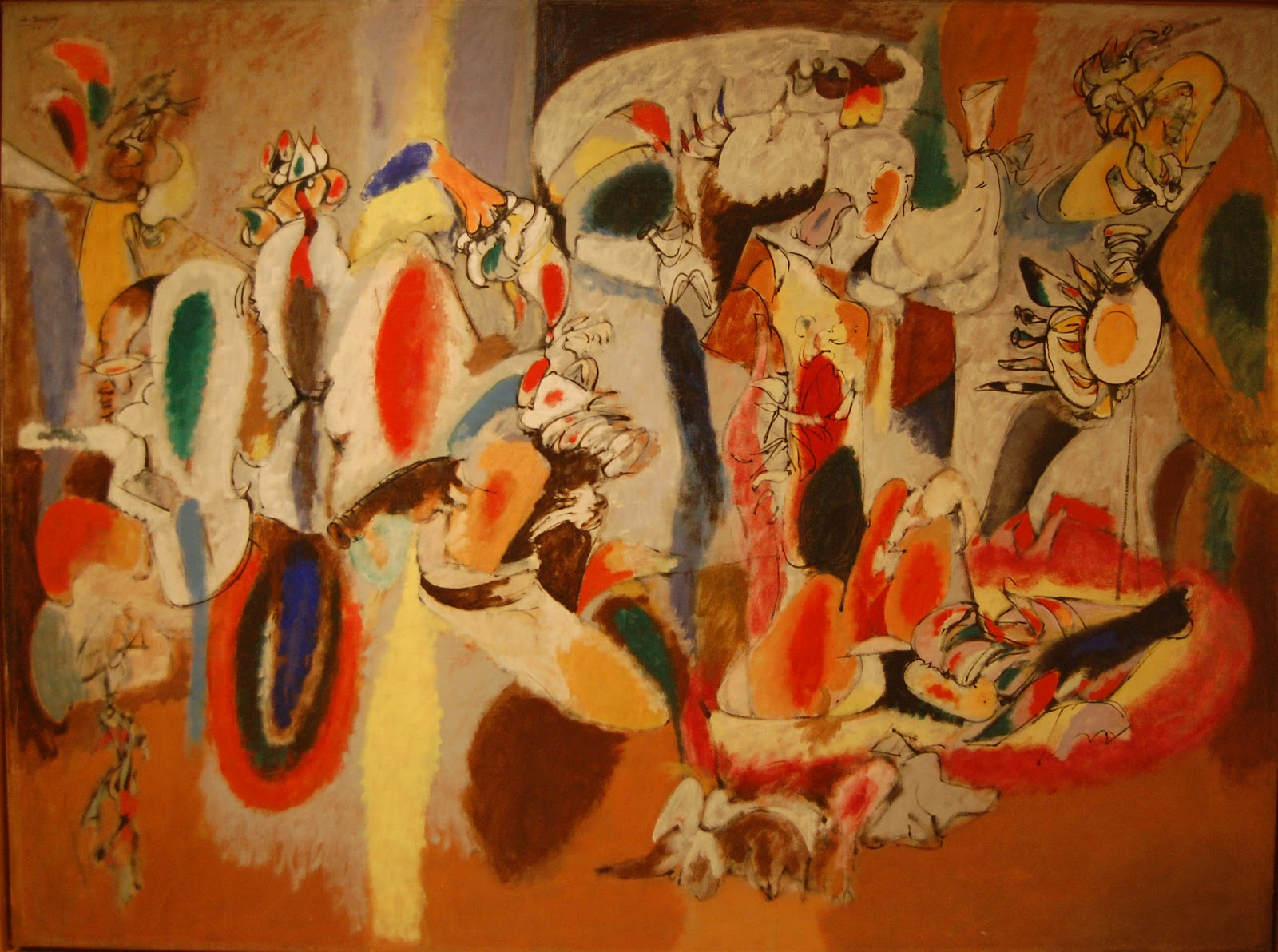
- Artist: Arshile Gorky
- Year: 1944
- Medium: Oil on canvas
- Movement: Cubism; Surrealism
- Location: Albright–Knox Art Gallery, Buffalo
- Website: https://buffaloakg.org/artworks/k19564-liver-cocks-comb

The Liver is the Cock's Comb is a cubist oil on canvas painting by Armenian-American artist Arshile Gorky. It is one of his largest and most famous paintings.

The painting is considered a precursor to abstract expressionism, a post-World War II art movement. Gorky was influenced by impressionism and the works of Cézanne.

== Title ==
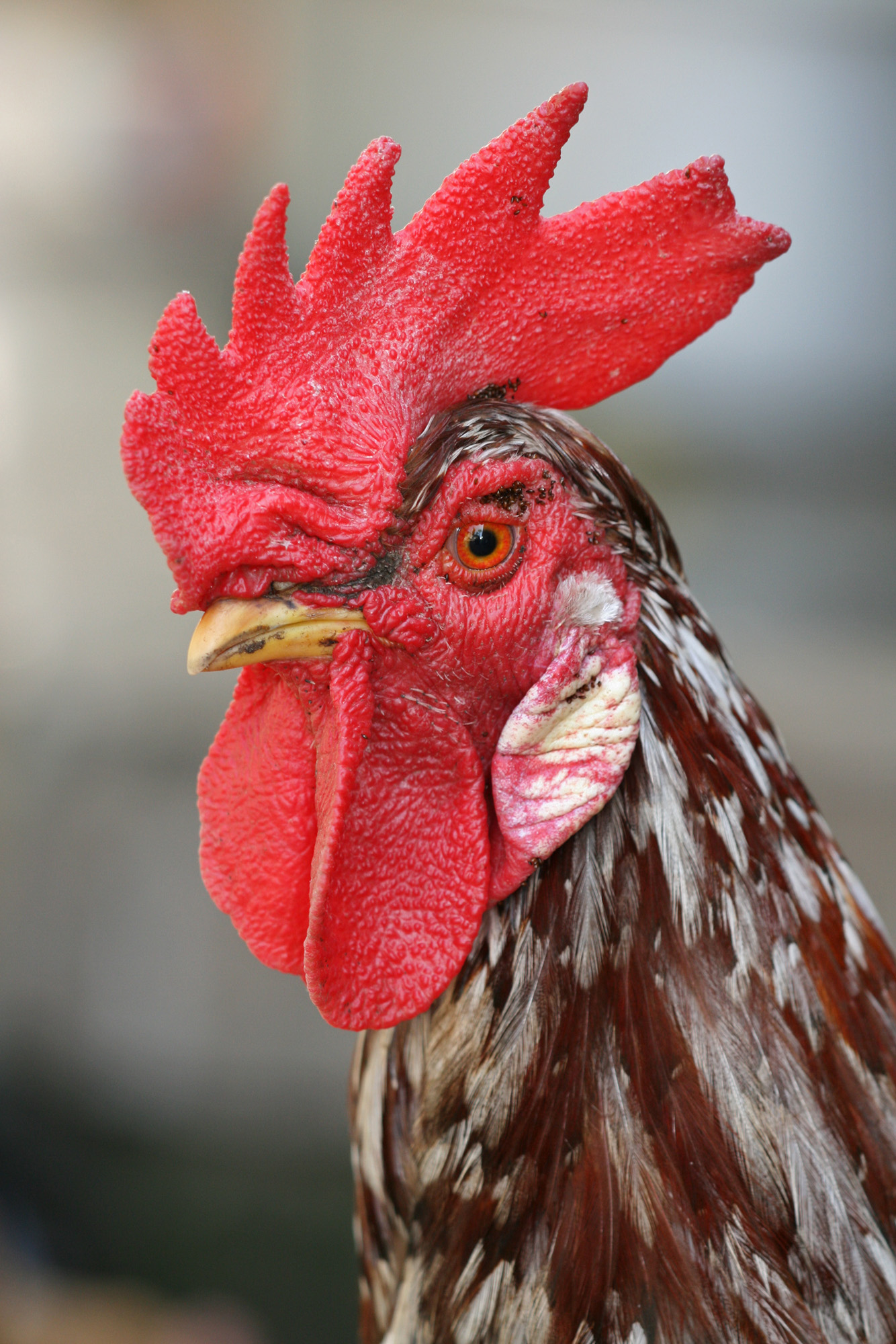
A rooster's comb, possibly referenced in the title

The title, The Liver is the Cock's Comb, is ambiguous, and many art historians have attempted to propose a meaning.

Some of the abstract forms floating in the painting resemble livers. The liver, to the ancient Greeks, was thought to house the soul.

A cock's comb, or coxcomb, can be a flowering plant, a jester’s cap, or a fool, among some possibilities. Some of the crown-shaped forms could also be a reference to a crest on a chicken. In Greek mythology, a rooster was sacrificed to the god of male-genitalia and fertility, Priapus.

== Inspiration ==
Gorky married his second wife, Agnes Magruder, in 1941. Her parents owned a farm in rural Virginia that is purportedly the inspiration for the setting of The Liver is the Cock's Comb. Gorky synthesized both the pastoral setting of Virginia with his memories of his homeland in modern-day Van.

== Description ==
The painting depicts abstract, colorful forms that swirl and intertwine. Gorky uses a wave form composition. There are biomorphic allusions to the human body: notably, human genitalia and the liver. However, some experts maintain that the painting's forms are truly abstract, and not a reference to any body part in particular.

== Reception ==
After seeing Gorky's works -- in particular, The Liver is the Cock's Comb -- the French artist André Breton said that the painting was "one of the most important paintings made in America."

Art historian and Buffalo AKG Art Museum director Janne Sirén said of the painting:

I’m endlessly mesmerised by Arshile Gorky’s painting The Liver is the Cock’s Comb (1944). In this kinetic landscape of memories and experiences, Gorky, a refugee from war-torn Armenia, celebrates life, love and the convergence of myth and reality. The painting never ceases to uplift me, while also inspiring a profound sense of humility and gratitude. How could Gorky, who had seen so much tragedy and experienced such loss, paint such a joyful landscape, and where does that leave those of us whose backpacks of hardships are far lighter?

== Connection to Hepatocentrism ==
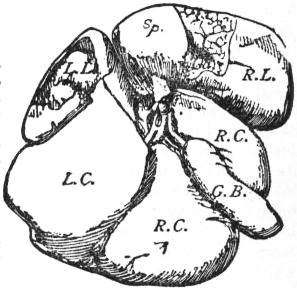
A diagram of a human liver

Hepatocentrism is the belief that the liver is the center of the human being. It has been found in numerous cultures, originating in ancient Mesopotamia. Some scholars have argued that The Liver is the Cock's Comb is an allusion to this belief. The liver, as the home of the soul may be contrasted with the violence of roosters, as alluded to in the title.

== See also ==
- Study for "The Liver is the Cock's Comb"
