= Cockscomb (mountain) =

Mountain in South Africa

- Hanekam
- Cockscomb peak rising out of the mist

Highest point
- Elevation: 1,768 m (5,801 ft)
- Prominence: 1,282 m (4,206 ft)
- Listing: Ribu
- Coordinates: 33°34′00″S 024°46′59″E

Geography
- Location within South Africa
- Location: Eastern Cape, South Africa
- Parent range: Great Winterhoek Mountains

The Cockscomb is a high mountain in the Eastern Cape, in South Africa. It gets its name from its resemblance to a fowl's comb. It is situated in the Baviaanskloof region and the nearest town is Patensie. The Cockscomb is part of the Groot Winterhoek range. Its peak is 1,768 m (5,801 ft) or 1,752 m (5,748 ft) above sea level, depending on the source.
