= Coxcomb =

Coxcomb may refer to:

- Coxcomb (ornithology), a fleshy growth on the top of the head of many gallinaceous birds
- Coxcomb (plant) or Celosia, a small genus of edible and ornamental plants
- The Coxcomb (play), an early Jacobean era stage play
- The Coxcomb (album), 1999 album by David Grubbs
- Fop or coxcomb, 17th century slang for a man overly concerned with his appearance
- A type of crystal habit in minerals
- A type of cap and bells or fool's hat

== See also ==
- Cockscomb (disambiguation)
- Coxcomb diagram or polar area diagram, a type of pie chart attributed to Florence Nightingale
- Coxcomb Mountains, mountain range of southern California
- Coxcomb Peak, a dolerite elevation in Antarctica
- Coxcomb Peak (Colorado), a mountain in Colorado, US
- Coxcomb prominent, a moth
