= Hretski rural council =

Hretski rural council is a lower-level subdivision (selsoviet) of Slutsk district, Minsk region, Belarus.
