= 2020 in public domain =

When a work's copyright expires, it enters the public domain. The following is a list of creators whose works entered the public domain in 2020. Since laws vary globally, the copyright status of some works is not uniform.

== Entering the public domain in countries with life + 70 years ==
With the exception of Belarus (Life + 50 years) and Spain (which has a copyright term of Life + 80 years for creators that died before 1987), a work enters the public domain in Europe at the end of the calendar year following 70 years after the creator's death, if it was published during the creator's lifetime. Russia has a 4-year extension to Life+ 70 (in essence Life+74) for authors who worked during World War II in the Soviet Union. The list is sorted alphabetically and includes a notable work of the creator that entered the public domain on January 1, 2020.

Names	Country	Death	Occupation	Notable work
James Truslow Adams	United States	18 May 1949	Writer	The March of Democracy
Virginia M. Alexander	United States	1949	Physician	Publications
Hervey Allen	United States	28 December 1949	Author	Anthony Adverse
Masaharu Anesaki	Japan	23 July 1949	Historian	History of Japanese Religion
Mary Antin	United States	15 May 1949	Writer	The Promised Land
Josef Maria Auchentaller	Austria	31 December 1949	Artist	Bunte Bände
Alice Bailey	United States	15 December 1949	Writer	Works
Rodolfo Garcia (pt)	Brazil	14 November 1949	Historian	
Hassan al-Banna	Egypt	12 February 1949	imam	Mudhakkirât al-da'wa wa al-dâ'iya
Philip Barry	United States	3 December 1949	Playwright	Holiday
Billy Baskette	United States	8 November 1949	Pianist, composer	Good Bye Broadway, Hello France
Rex Beach	United States	7 December 1949	Writer, Olympic athlete	The Spoilers
H. Bedford-Jones	United States	6 May 1949	Writer	The John Solomon series
Khalil Beidas	Palestine	1949	novelist	Works
Federico Beltrán Masses	Spain	4 October 1949	Painter	
Friedrich Bergius	Germany	30 March 1949	Chemist	Bergius process
Elsa Bernstein	Austria	2 July 1949	Writer	Königskinder
Musa Bigiev	Russia	28 October 1949	Theologian	Selected works
Elisheva Bikhovski	Israel	27 March 1949	Writer, Translator	Simta'ot
Henriëtte Blaauw	Netherlands	15 February 1949	Writer	
Gustavus M. Blech	United States	9 August 1949	Physician	Practical Suggestions in Borderland Surgery
Leonard Bloomfield	United States	18 April 1949	Linguist	Selected publications
George Botsford	United States	1 February 1949	Composer	
Robert Boudrioz	France	22 June 1949	Film director, screenwriter	The Man with a Broken Ear
Umberto Brunelleschi	Italy	16 February 1949	Artist, Illustrator	
Guillermo Buitrago	Colombia	19 April 1949	Composer	La Vispera de Año Nuevo
Harry Burleigh	United States	12 September 1949	Composer, singer	settings of spirituals
Helen Churchill Candee	United States	23 August 1949	Writer, feminist	Angkor the Magnificent
Reg Carter	United Kingdom	24 April 1949	Cartoonist	Big Eggo
N. D. Cocea	Romania	1 February 1949	Journalist, Novelist	Vinul de viață lungă
Richard Connell	United States	22 November 1949	Writer	The Most Dangerous Game
Carlo Conti Rossini	Italy	1949	Orientalist	Italia ed Etiopia dal trattato di Uccialli alla battaglia d'Adua
Dorothea Conyers	Ireland	25 May 1949	Novelist	
Will Cuppy	United States	19 September 1949	Humorist	How to be a Hermit
Stoyan Danev	Bulgaria	30 July 1949	Jurist and politician	
Norman Davey	United Kingdom	6 June 1949	Engineer, Writer	The Pilgrim of a Smile
Edgar De Lange	United States	13 July 1949	Composer	
Félix d'Herelle	France	22 February 1949	Microbiologist	Published works
Georgi Dimitrov	Bulgaria	2 July 1949	Politician, revolutionary	Georgi Dimitrov bibliography
Grigoraș Dinicu	Romania	28 March 1949	Composer	Hora staccato
Ali Douagi	Tunisia	27 May 1949	sketch artist	Sahirtu minhu al-layali
Alexander Drankov	Russia; Soviet Union	3 January 1949	photographer, cameraman, film producer	
William Price Drury	United Kingdom	21 January 1949	Writer, soldier, politician	The Flag Lieutenant
Inés Echeverría Bello	Chile	1949	Writer	Entre Deux Mondes
Arthur Eichengrün	Germany	23 December 1949	Chemist	50 Jahre Aspirin
Emil Elenius	Finland	1 March 1949	novelist	Silkkilaiva
James Ensor	Belgium	19 November 1949	Artist	Christ's Entry Into Brussels in 1889
Herbert Eulenberg	Germany	4 September 1949	Writer	Schattenbilder. Eine Fibel für Kulturbedürftige in Deutschland
August Fischer	Germany	14 February 1949	Orientalist	Arabische Chrestomathie aus Prosaschriftstellern
Victor Fleming	United States	6 January 1949	Film Director	The Wizard of Oz, Gone with the Wind
James Forrestal	United States	22 May 1949	Politician	The Forrestal Diaries
Nikolay Gamaleya	Russia	29 March 1949	Physician, microbiologist	
Henri Giraud	France	11 March 1949	General	Mes Evasions, Un seul but; la victoire: Alger 1942-1944
Mikhail Golodny	Russia	20 January 1949	Poet	Song about Shchors
Ángel González Palencia	Spain	30 October 1949	Orientalist	El amor entre los musulmanes españoles, El tesoro de los Nazaríes
Hari Singh Gour	India	25 December 1949	Jurist, educator, writer	The Penal Law of India
Martin Grabmann	Germany	9 January 1949	Priest, Historian	Thomas Aquinas: His Personality and Thought
Stanisław Grabski	Poland	6 May 1949	Economist, Politician	
Major Greenwood	United Kingdom	5 October 1949	Epidemiologist	Publications
Joan Lamote de Grignon	Spain	11 March 1949	Composer	La nit de Nadal
George Gurdjieff	Armenia	29 October 1949	spiritual teacher	The Herald of Coming Good
František Halas	Czech Republic	27 October 1949	Poet, translator	
Fritz Hart	United Kingdom	9 July 1949	Composer, conductor	
Syed Zafarul Hasan	Pakistan	19 June 1949	Philosopher	Realism
Kunihiko Hashimoto	Japan	6 May 1949	Composer	Azami no Hana
Will Hay	United Kingdom	18 April 1949	Comedian, amateur astronomer	Through My Telescope
Burton J. Hendrick	United States	23 March 1949	Author	The Life and Letters of Walter H. Page
Johann Jakob Hess	Germany	29 April 1949	Egyptologist	Von den Beduinen des inneren Arabiens
Ludwig Hohlwein	Germany	15 September 1949	Poster artist	
William Jackson Humphreys	United States	10 November 1949	physicist	Bibliography
Otto Hupp	Germany	31 January 1949	graphical artist	Wappen und Siegel der deutschen Städte, Flecken und Dörfer
Douglas Hyde	Ireland	12 July 1949	linguist	The necessity for de-anglicising the Irish nation
Edmond Jaloux	France	22 August 1949	Novelist	Works
Josep Maria Jujol	Spain	1 May 1949	Architect	Casa Batlló, Park Güell
Oskar Jellinek	Austria	12 October 1949	Writer	Die Mutter der Neun
Clarence Jones	United States	1 June 1949	Composer	
Pierre Jouguet	France	9 July 1949	Egyptologist	Works
Unno Juza	Japan	17 May 1949	Writer of science fiction	
Anna Karima	Bulgaria	6 March 1949	Writer and translator	
Selâhattin Kantar	Turkey	17 November 1949	playwright	Kara Dana
Kim Ku	South Korea	26 June 1949	Politician	Diary of Kim Ku
Hans Kindler	United States	30 August 1949	Conductor, cellist, arranger of music	Recordings
Hugh Kingsmill	United Kingdom	15 May 1949	Writer, journalist	
Martin Knudsen	Denmark	27 May 1949	Physicist	The Kinetic Theory of Gases
József Koszta	Hungary	29 July 1949	Painter	Girl with Geraniums
Fritz Krischen	Germany	15 July 1949	Archaeologist, Architect	Die Stadtmauern von Pompeji und griechische Festungsbaukunst in Unteritalien und Sizilien
August Krogh	Denmark	13 September 1949	Zoologist	The Respiratory Exchange of Animals and Man
Albert Christian Kruyt	Netherlands	19 January 1949	Ethnographer	The Bare'e speaking Toraja of Central Sulawesi
Lead Belly	United States	6 December 1949	Musician, songwriter	Goodnight, Irene
Vasily Lebedev-Kumach	Russia	20 February 1949	Poet	The Sacred War
Fidelio Ponce de León	Cuba	19 February 1949	Painter	Niňos
Ernst Lommatzsch	Germany	5 April 1949	Classical scholar	Corpus inscriptionum latinarum: Vol. 1. Inscriptiones Latinae antiquissimae
Albert Howe Lybyer	United States	1949	orientalist	The Government of the Ottoman Empire in the Time of Suleiman the Magnificent
Carmen Lyra	Costa Rica	13 May 1949	Writer	Cuentos De Mi Tia Panchita
Antonio Machado	Spain	22 February 1939	Poet	Works
Maurice Maeterlinck	Belgium	6 May 1949	Playwright	Works
René Maire	France	24 November 1949	botanist	Flore de l'Afrique du Nord
Jane Mander	New Zealand	20 December 1949	Novelist	The Story of a New Zealand River
Klaus Mann	Germany	21 May 1949	Novelist	Mephisto
J. C. Mardrus	France	1949	Orientalist	Works
Paul Marc	Germany	23 September 1949	Byzantine scholar	Die hellenistisch-jüdische Literatur
Wilhelm von Massow	Germany	21 April 1949	Archaeologist	Das römische Trier
Elton Mayo	Australia	7 September 1949	Psychologist	Publications
Ibrahim al-Mazini	Egypt	1949	Writer	Spider Webs
Stefan Meyer	Austria	29 December 1949	Physicist	Radioaktivität
Margaret Mitchell	United States	16 August 1949	Novelist	Gone with the Wind
Axel Munthe	Sweden	11 February 1949	Psychiatrist	The Story of San Michele
Khalil Mutran	Lebanon	1 June 1949	poet	
Sarojini Naidu	India	2 March 1949	Poet	Works
Vladimir Nazor	Croatia	19 June 1949	Poet, politician	
Makino Nobuaki	Japan	25 January 1949	Statesman	Makino Nobuaki nikki
Vítězslav Novák	Czech Republic	18 July 1949	Composer	Bouře
Carlos Obligado	Argentina	3 February 1949	Writer, critic	March of the Malvinas
Sidney Olcott	Canada	16 December 1949	Film director	The Pony Express
Francesco Pasinetti	Italy	2 April 1949	Film Director, screenwriter	The Canal of the Angels
Elin Pelin	Bulgaria	3 December 1949	Writer	
Una Pope-Hennessy	United Kingdom	16 August 1949	Historian	Secret Societies and the French Revolution
Camillo Praschniker	Austria	1 October 1949	Archaeologist	Archäologische Forschungen in Albanien und Montenegro
Guillermo Tell Villegas Pulido	Venezuela	25 July 1949	politician	Works
Alfred Rehder	United States	25 July 1949	Botanist	Manual of Cultivated Trees and Shrubs, Hardy in North America
Albert Rehm	Germany	31 July 1949	Classical scholar	Mythographische Untersuchungen über griechische Sternsagen
Gennaro Righelli	Italy	6 January 1949	Film director, screenwriter	Svengali
Tod Robbins	United States	1949	writer	Works
Julius Ruska	Germany	11 February 1949	Orientalist	Al Razi (Rhases) als Chemiker
Antoun Saadeh	Lebanon	8 July 1949	Politician	Nushu' al-Umam
E. Robert Schmitz	France	5 September 1949	Composer	The Piano works of Claude Debussy
Paul Schultze-Naumburg	Germany	19 May 1949	Architect	Die Kunst der Deutschen. Ihr Wesen und ihre Werke
Alexey Shchusev	Russia	24 May 1949	Architect	Lenin's Mausoleum
Nikos Skalkottas	Greece	19 September 1949	Composer	List of compositions by Nikos Skalkottas
G. E. M. Skues	United Kingdom	9 August 1949	Writer, fly fisherman	The Way of a Trout with the Fly
Frank Smythe	United Kingdom	27 June 1949	Mountaineer, author, photographer	The Kangchenjunga Adventure
Edith Somerville	Ireland	8 October 1949	Novelist	The Irish R.M.
Otto Stählin	Germany	14 June 1949	Classical scholar	Die hellenistisch-jüdische Literatur
Edward Stettinius	United States	31 October 1949	Politician	Roosevelt and the Russians
Herbert Stothart	United States	1 February 1949	Composer, songwriter, conductor	Score for The Wizard of Oz
Richard Strauss	Germany	8 September 1949	Composer	List of compositions
Harry Stack Sullivan	United States	14 January 1949	Psychiatrist	Works
Ali Mahmoud Taha	Egypt	17 November 1949	Poet	Nights of the Lost Sailor, Palestine
Edward Thorndike	United States	9 August 1949	Psychologist	Works
Joaquín Torres-García	Uruguay	8 August 1949	Artist, writer	
Gancho Tsenov	Bulgaria	1949	Historian	
Joaquín Turina	Spain	14 January 1949	Composer	Danzas fantásticas
Uemura Shōen	Japan	27 August 1949	Artist	Jo-no-mai
Sigrid Undset	Norway	10 June 1949	Novelist	Works
Shabbir Ahmad Usmani	Pakistan	13 December 1949	theologian	Fathul Mulhim Sharh Sahih Muslim
Raimond Valgre	Estonia	31 December 1949	composer, musician	
Josef Velenovský	Czech Republic	7 May 1949	botanist	Works
Oswald Garrison Villard	United States	1 October 1949	Journalist, civil rights activist	John Brown 1800-1859: A Biography Fifty Years After
Rosy Wertheim	Netherlands	27 May 1949	Composer	
Elin Wägner	Sweden	7 January 1949	Novelist	The Penholder
Lee "Lasses" White	United States	16 December 1949	Pianist, songwriter, actor	
E. H. Young	United Kingdom	8 August 1949	Novelist and children's writer	
Arthur Leo Zagat	United States	3 April 1949	Writer, lawyer	
Nikola Zhekov	Bulgaria	1 November 1949	General	Memoirs
Oton Župančič	Slovenia	11 June 1949	Writer, translator	Ciciban

== Countries with life + 60 years ==
In Bangladesh, India, and Venezuela a work enters the public domain 60 years after the creator's death.

Names	Country	Death	Occupation	Notable work
Santiago Key Ayala	Venezuela	21 August 1959	Historian, diplomat	
Haricharan Bandopadhayaya	India	13 January 1959	Scholar, dictionary compiler	
Barindra Kumar Ghosh	India	18 April 1959	Journalist	
Pattukkottai Kalyanasundaram	India	8 October 1959	Film lyricist	
Abdur Razzaq Malihabadi	India	1959	Writer	
J. R. Rangaraju	India	1959	Novelist	
Govind Sakharam Sardesai	India	21 November 1959	Historian	

== Entering the public domain in countries with life + 50 years ==
In most countries of Africa and Asia, as well as Belarus, Bolivia, Canada, New Zealand, Egypt and Uruguay; a work enters the public domain at the end of the calendar year following 50 years after the creator's death.

Names	Country	Death	Occupation	Notable work
Alejandro G. Abadilla	Philippines	26 August 1969	Writer	Ako ang Daigdig
Sargis Abrahamyan	Armenia	15 June 1969	Writer	With Generations
Theodor W. Adorno	Germany	6 August 1969	Philosopher	Theodor W. Adorno bibliography
Ricardo Aguirre	Venezuela	8 November 1969	Singer, Composer	La Grey Zuliana
Ignacio Aldecoa	Spain	15 November 1969	Author	El fulgor y la sangre
Ikbal Ali Shah	India	4 November 1969	Writer, diplomat	Afghanistan of the Afghans
Edgar Anderson	United States	18 June 1969	Botanist	Introgressive Hybridization
Charlotte Armstrong	United States	7 July 1969	Author	A Dram of Poison
Marius Barbeau	Canada	27 February 1969	Ethnographer	Downfall of Temlaham
Daniel E. Barbey	United States	11 March 1969	Naval Officer	MacArthur's Amphibious Navy
Arthur K. Barnes	United States	11 March 1969	Science-Fiction Writer	Works
Emilio Bigi	Paraguay	28 May 1969	Musician	Renacer guarani
Charles Brackett	United States	9 March 1969	Novelist, Screenwriter	
Gabriel Chevallier	France	6 April 1969	Novelist	Clochemerle
Ivy Compton-Burnett	United Kingdom	27 August 1969	Novelist	Manservant and Maidservant
Richmal Crompton	United Kingdom	11 January 1969	Writer, Teacher	Just William series
Alexandra David-Néel	Belgium; France	8 September 1969	Explorer, Spiritualist	Mystiques et magiciens du Tibet
Aleksandr Deyneka	Russia	12 June 1969	Artist	The Defense of Petrograd
Otto Dix	Germany	25 July 1969	Artist	The Trench
Duke Adolf Friedrich of Mecklenburg	Germany	5 August 1969	explorer, politician	Ins innerste Afrika
Max Eastman	United States	25 March 1969	Writer	Reflections on the Failure of Socialism
Dwight D. Eisenhower	United States	28 March 1969	Military Officer, statesman	Crusade in Europe
Abo El Seoud El Ebiary	Egypt	17 March 1969	Playwright, songwriter	Afrita hanem
Olivia FitzRoy	United Kingdom	24 December 1969	Author of children's books	Orders to Poach
Botong Francisco	Philippines	31 March 1969	Muralist	The Progress of Medicine in the Philippines
Karl Freund	Germany	3 May 1969	Cinematographer, film director	The Mummy
Rómulo Gallegos	Venezuela	5 April 1969	Novelist, politician	Doña Bárbara
Witold Gombrowicz	Poland	24 July 1969	Writer, playwright	Ferdydurke
Walter Gropius	Germany	5 July 1969	Architect	Bauhaus
Walter Hahn	Germany	24 November 1969	Photographer	Collection at Deutsche Fotothek
Wendell Hall	United States	2 April 1969	Singer-songwriter	It Ain't Gonna Rain No Mo'
Ho Chi Minh	Vietnam	2 September 1969	President	Proclamation of Independence of the Democratic Republic of Vietnam
Karl Jaspers	Germany	26 February 1969	Psychiatrist, Philosopher	General Psychopathology
Jack Kerouac	United States	21 October 1969	Writer	On the Road
Norman Lindsay	Australia	21 November 1969	Artist, Writer	The Magic Pudding
Frank Loesser	United States	28 July 1969	Songwriter	Baby, It's Cold Outside, A Bushel and a Peck
Erika Mann	Germany	27 August 1969	Writer, actress	Zehn Millionen Kinder. Die Erziehung der Jugend im Dritten Reich
Gavin Maxwell	United Kingdom	7 September 1969	Author	Ring of Bright Water
Leo McCarey	United States	5 July 1969	Film director, screenwriter	The Bells of St. Mary's
Jimmy McHugh	United States	23 May 1969	Composer	South American Way
Atanasio Ndongo Miyone	Equatorial Guinea	26 March 1969	Musician	Caminemos pisando las sendas de nuestra inmensa felicidad
Meher Baba	India	31 January 1969	Mystic	God Speaks
Mikio Naruse	Japan	2 July 1969	Film director, screenwriter	Apart from You
Mutesa II of Buganda	Uganda	21 November 1969	Statesman	The Desecration of My Kingdom
Seabury Quinn	United States	24 December 1969	Author, lawyer	Roads
August Sang	Estonia	14 October 1969	Poet	Üks noormees otsib õnne
Muhammad Shahidullah	Bangladesh	13 July 1969	Writer, philologist	Bangla Sahityer Katha
Ben Shahn	United States	14 March 1969	Artist	Jersey Homesteads Mural
Osbert Sitwell	United Kingdom	4 May 1969	Writer	Before the Bombardment
Josef von Sternberg	United States	22 December 1969	Film director	Shanghai Express
Leonard Woolf	United Kingdom	14 August 1969	writer, publisher	The Village in the Jungle
John Wyndham	United Kingdom	11 March 1969	Science-Fiction Writer	The Day of the Triffids, The Midwich Cuckoos
Stoyan Zagorchinov	Bulgaria	January 1969	Writer	Last Day, God's Day
Jorge Zalamea	Colombia	10 May 1969	Writer, poet, journalist	El Sueño de las Escalinatas
Gostan Zarian	Armenia	11 December 1969	Poet, diarist	The Ship on the Mountain
Nairi Zarian	Armenia	12 July 1969	Poet, playwright	Արա Գեղեցիկ
Jerzy Zawieyski	Poland	18 June 1969	Playwright, novelist	Dobrze, że byli
Leane Zugsmith	United States	13 October 1969	Writer	Stories for The New Yorker

== Entering the public domain in Australia ==
In 2004 copyright in Australia changed from a "plus 50" law to a "plus 70" law, in line with America and the European Union. But the change was not made retroactive (unlike the 1995 change in the European Union which brought some European authors back into copyright, especially those who died from 1925 to 1944). Hence the work of an author who died before 1955 is normally in the public domain in Australia; but the copyright of authors was extended to 70 years after death for those who died in 1955 or later, and no more Australian authors would come out of copyright until 1 January 2026 (those who died in 1955).

Unpublished works by authors who died in 1949 entered the public domain on 1 January 2020. Any published literary, artistic, dramatic, or musical work (other than computer programs) by a not generally known author (anonymous or pseudonymous) from 1949 also entered the public domain on that date.

== Entering the public domain in the United States ==
The United States Marine Band's rendition of Rhapsody in Blue by George Gershwin, which entered the public domain in the US in 2020.

Under the Copyright Term Extension Act, works that entered the public domain on January 1, 2020, in the United States include books, films, printed music, and other works published in 1924. However, sound recordings that were first made prior to February 15, 1972, are treated as a special case under US copyright law, and under the Music Modernization Act, sound recordings published in 1924 did not enter the public domain until 2025. Unpublished works whose authors died in 1949 also entered the public domain.

Notable books that entered the public domain in the United States in 2020 include The Magic Mountain by Thomas Mann, A Passage to India by E. M. Forster, Some Do Not ... by Ford Madox Ford (the first volume of his Parade's End tetralogy), Desire Under the Elms by Eugene O'Neill, the quadrilogy of novellas Old New York by Edith Wharton, the English translation of We by Yevgeny Zamyatin, When We Were Very Young by A. A. Milne, Doctor Dolittle's Circus by Hugh Lofting, Tarzan and the Ant Men by Edgar Rice Burroughs, The Man in the Brown Suit by Agatha Christie, and The King of Elfland's Daughter by Lord Dunsany.

Various silent films entered the American public domain in 2020, including Buster Keaton's comedies Sherlock Jr. and The Navigator, Harold Lloyd's films Girl Shy and Hot Water, the first film adaptation of Peter Pan, The Sea Hawk, Secrets, He Who Gets Slapped, and Dante's Inferno. Also entering the public domain was the sheet music for George Gershwin's Rhapsody in Blue and his songs "Fascinating Rhythm" and "Oh, Lady Be Good!", Irving Berlin's song "Lazy", Cora Austin's "Jealous Hearted Blues", the "Santa Claus Blues" as recorded by Louis Armstrong, and Gus Kahn's song "Nobody's Sweetheart".

== Worldwide ==
In October 2020, satirical singer/songwriter Tom Lehrer announced the release of all of his lyrics and music to the public domain.

On February 28, 2020, Sketchfab released 1.7 thousand 3D models of cultural artefacts into the public domain.

On February 27, 2020, the Smithsonian Institution announced it will release 2.6 million images into the public domain.

On January 14, 2020, Paris Musées released 100,000 images of artworks in the public domain.

== See also ==
- List of American films of 1924
- List of countries' copyright lengths
- Public Domain Day
- Creative Commons
- Public Domain
- Over 300 public domain authors available in Wikisource (any language), with descriptions from Wikidata
- 1919 in literature and 1969 in literature
