= 2030 in public domain =

When a work's copyright expires, it enters the public domain. Since laws vary globally, the copyright status of some works are not uniform. The following is a list of creators whose works enter the public domain in 2030.

== Countries with life + 70 years ==
Except for Belarus (Life + 50 years) and Spain (which has a copyright term of Life + 80 years for creators that died before 1988), a work enters the public domain in Europe 70 years after the creator's death, if it was published during the creator's lifetime. In addition, several other countries have a limit of 70 years. The list is sorted alphabetically and includes a notable work of the creator.

Names	Country	Death	Occupation	Notable work
Maurice Allem	France	1 September 1959	Philologist	Monographies
Marguerite Allotte de La Fuÿe	France	8 April 1959	Writer	Publications
Manuel Altolaguirre	Spain	26 July 1959	Poet, screenwriter	Las islas invitadas y otros poemas (The Invited Isle and Other Poems), El triunfo de las germanías (The Triumph of the Brotherhood of the Guilds)
Maxwell Anderson	United States	28 February 1959	Playwright, poet	Both Your Houses, Joan of Lorraine
Edwin Balmer	United States	21 March 1959	Author	When Worlds Collide
Jacques Bardoux	France	15 August 1959	Politician	Publications
Johan Bojer	Norway	3 July 1959	Novelist, playwright	Den siste viking (The Last of the Vikings), Vor egen stamme(The Emigrants)
The Big Bopper	United States	3 February 1959	Singer and songwriter	
Louis Borgex	France	1959	Caricaturist	
Arnolt Bronnen	Austria	12 October 1959	Playwright	Parricide, Birth of Youth
Emil František Burian	Czech Republic	9 August 1959	Poet, playwright	Member of Osvobozené divadlo
Raymond Chandler	United States	26 March 1959	Detective fiction novelist, screenwriter	The Big Sleep, Farewell, My Lovely, Double Indemnity; The Little Sister, The Long Goodbye
Claire Delbos	France	22 April 1959	Musician	Compositions
Cecil B. DeMille	United States	21 January 1959	Director	The Ten Commandments, The Greatest Show on Earth
Laxmi Prasad Devkota	Nepal	14 September 1959	Poet, playwright, novelist	Muna Madan, Shakuntala
Dominique Dunois	France	16 January 1959	Writer	Works
Apsley Cherry-Garrard	United Kingdom	18 May 1959	Memoirist	The Worst Journey in the World
G. D. H. Cole	United Kingdom	14 January 1959	Political theorist, economist, historian, short story writer	The Brooklyn Murders, The Death of a Millionaire
Harry Eliott	France	29 May 1959	Painter	
Edvard Eriksen	Denmark, Iceland	12 January 1959	Sculptor	The Little Mermaid
W. W. Greg	United Kingdom	4 March 1959	Bibliographer, Shakespearean scholar	Dramatic Documents from the Elizabethan Playhouses, English Literary Autographs, 1550–1650
Otfrid von Hanstein	Germany	17 February 1959	Author	Works
Olle Hjortzberg	Sweden	8 March 1959	Painter, illustrator	1912 Summer Olympics poster
Billie Holiday	United States	17 July 1959	Singer and songwriter	
Buddy Holly	United States	3 February 1959	Singer and songwriter	
Laurence Housman	United Kingdom	20 February 1959	Novelist, playwright, illustrator	An Englishwoman's Love-letters, Victoria Regina
Julien Josephson	United States	14 April 1959	Screenwriter	Lady Windermere's Fan, The Bat, Heidi, Wee Willie Winkie
Alfred Kubin	Austria	20 August 1959	Author and illustrator	The Other Side
Carlo Lombardo	Italy	19 December 1959	Composer	Operettas
Edmond Loutil	France	16 April 1959	Journalist	Works
Edwin Muir	United Kingdom	3 January 1959	Poet, novelist	The Present Age from 1914, The Scots and Their Country
T. C. Murray	Ireland	7 March 1959	Playwright	Maurice Harte, Autumn Fire, The Wheel of Fortune, Birthright
Luis Palés Matos	Puerto Rico	23 February 1959	Poet	El palacio en sombras (The Palace in Shadows), Falsa canción de baquiné (False Song of a funeral for a child)
Benjamin Péret	France	18 September 1959	Poet	Le Passager du transatlantique, De derrière les fagots
Arthur Cecil Pigou	United Kingdom	7 March 1959	Economist	Major publications
Henri Pourrat	France	16 July 1959	Writer	Works
Sax Rohmer	United Kingdom	1 June 1959	Crime novelist, horror fiction writer	The Mystery of Dr. Fu-Manchu, Brood of the Witch-Queen
Govind Sakharam Sardesai	India	21 November 1959	Historian	
Alfred Schütz	Austria	20 May 1959	Philosopher, social phenomenologist	William James' Concept of the Stream of Consciousness Phenomenologically Interpreted, The Stranger
Edmond Sée	France	12 November 1959	Playwright	Works
André Siegfried	France	28 March 1959	Geographer	Works
Pauline Smith	South Africa	29 January 1959	Novelist, short story writer, memoirist, playwright	The Little Karoo, The Beadle
Galaktion Tabidze	Georgia	17 March 1959	Poet	The Wind Blows
Ritchie Valens	United States	3 February 1959	Singer and songwriter	
José Vasconcelos	Mexico	30 June 1959	Philosopher	La raza cósmica (The Cosmic Race)
Luigi Villari	Italy	1959	Historian	
Boris Vian	France	23 June 1959	Novelist	I Spit on Your Graves, Froth on the Daydream
Percy F. Westerman	United Kingdom	22 February 1959	Children's writer	King of Kilba
Frank Lloyd Wright	United States	9 April 1959	Architect, designer and writer	Works

== Countries with life + 60 years ==
In Bangladesh, India, and Venezuela a work enters the public domain 60 years after the creator's death.

Names	Country	Death	Occupation	Notable work
Alejandro G. Abadilla	Philippines	26 August 1969	Writer	Ako ang Daigdig
Sargis Abrahamyan	Armenia	15 June 1969	Writer	With Generations
Theodor W. Adorno	Germany	6 August 1969	Philosopher	Theodor W. Adorno bibliography
Ricardo Aguirre	Venezuela	8 November 1969	Singer, Composer	La Grey Zuliana
Ignacio Aldecoa	Spain	15 November 1969	Author	El fulgor y la sangre
Ikbal Ali Shah	India	4 November 1969	Writer, diplomat	Afghanistan of the Afghans
Edgar Anderson	United States	18 June 1969	Botanist	Introgressive Hybridization
Charlotte Armstrong	United States	7 July 1969	Author	A Dram of Poison
Marius Barbeau	Canada	27 February 1969	Ethnographer	Downfall of Temlaham
Daniel E. Barbey	United States	11 March 1969	Naval Officer	MacArthur's Amphibious Navy
Arthur K. Barnes	United States	11 March 1969	Science-Fiction Writer	Works
Emilio Bigi	Paraguay	28 May 1969	Musician	Renacer guarani
Charles Brackett	United States	9 March 1969	Novelist, Screenwriter	
Gabriel Chevallier	France	6 April 1969	Novelist	Clochemerle
Ivy Compton-Burnett	United Kingdom	27 August 1969	Novelist	Manservant and Maidservant
Richmal Crompton	United Kingdom	11 January 1969	Writer, Teacher	Just William series
Alexandra David-Néel	Belgium; France	8 September 1969	Explorer, Spiritualist	Mystiques et magiciens du Tibet
Aleksandr Deyneka	Russia	12 June 1969	Artist	The Defense of Petrograd
Otto Dix	Germany	25 July 1969	Artist	The Trench
Duke Adolf Friedrich of Mecklenburg	Germany	5 August 1969	explorer, politician	Ins innerste Afrika
Max Eastman	United States	25 March 1969	Writer	Reflections on the Failure of Socialism
Dwight D. Eisenhower	United States	28 March 1969	Military Officer, statesman	Crusade in Europe
Abo El Seoud El Ebiary	Egypt	17 March 1969	Playwright, songwriter	Afrita hanem
Olivia FitzRoy	United Kingdom	24 December 1969	Author of children's books	Orders to Poach
Botong Francisco	Philippines	31 March 1969	Muralist	The Progress of Medicine in the Philippines
Karl Freund	Germany	3 May 1969	Cinematographer, film director	The Mummy
Rómulo Gallegos	Venezuela	5 April 1969	Novelist, politician	Doña Bárbara
Witold Gombrowicz	Poland	24 July 1969	Writer, playwright	Ferdydurke
Walter Gropius	Germany	5 July 1969	Architect	Bauhaus
Walter Hahn	Germany	24 November 1969	Photographer	Collection at Deutsche Fotothek
Wendell Hall	United States	2 April 1969	Singer-songwriter	It Ain't Gonna Rain No Mo'
Ho Chi Minh	Vietnam	2 September 1969	President	Proclamation of Independence of the Democratic Republic of Vietnam
Karl Jaspers	Germany	26 February 1969	Psychiatrist, Philosopher	General Psychopathology
Jack Kerouac	United States	21 October 1969	Writer	On the Road
Norman Lindsay	Australia	21 November 1969	Artist, Writer	The Magic Pudding
Frank Loesser	United States	28 July 1969	Songwriter	Baby, It's Cold Outside, A Bushel and a Peck
Erika Mann	Germany	27 August 1969	Writer, actress	Zehn Millionen Kinder. Die Erziehung der Jugend im Dritten Reich
Gavin Maxwell	United Kingdom	7 September 1969	Author	Ring of Bright Water
Leo McCarey	United States	5 July 1969	Film director, screenwriter	The Bells of St. Mary's
Jimmy McHugh	United States	23 May 1969	Composer	South American Way
Atanasio Ndongo Miyone	Equatorial Guinea	26 March 1969	Musician	Caminemos pisando las sendas de nuestra inmensa felicidad
Meher Baba	India	31 January 1969	Mystic	God Speaks
Mikio Naruse	Japan	2 July 1969	Film director, screenwriter	Apart from You
Mutesa II of Buganda	Uganda	21 November 1969	Statesman	The Desecration of My Kingdom
Seabury Quinn	United States	24 December 1969	Author, lawyer	Roads
August Sang	Estonia	14 October 1969	Poet	Üks noormees otsib õnne
Muhammad Shahidullah	Bangladesh	13 July 1969	Writer, philologist	Bangla Sahityer Katha
Ben Shahn	United States	14 March 1969	Artist	Jersey Homesteads Mural
Osbert Sitwell	United Kingdom	4 May 1969	Writer	Before the Bombardment
Josef von Sternberg	United States	22 December 1969	Film director	Shanghai Express
Leonard Woolf	United Kingdom	14 August 1969	writer, publisher	The Village in the Jungle
John Wyndham	United Kingdom	11 March 1969	Science-Fiction Writer	The Day of the Triffids, The Midwich Cuckoos
Stoyan Zagorchinov	Bulgaria	January 1969	Writer	Last Day, God's Day
Jorge Zalamea	Colombia	10 May 1969	Writer, poet, journalist	El Sueño de las Escalinatas
Gostan Zarian	Armenia	11 December 1969	Poet, diarist	The Ship on the Mountain
Nairi Zarian	Armenia	12 July 1969	Poet, playwright	Արա Գեղեցիկ
Jerzy Zawieyski	Poland	18 June 1969	Playwright, novelist	Dobrze, że byli
Leane Zugsmith	United States	13 October 1969	Writer	Stories for The New Yorker

== Countries with life + 50 years ==
In most countries of Africa and Asia, as well as Belarus, Bolivia, New Zealand, Egypt and Uruguay, a work enters the public domain 50 years after the creator's death.

Names	Country	Death	Occupation	Notable work
Dorothy Arzner	United States	1 October 1979	Filmmaker	
Elizabeth Bishop	United States	6 October 1979	Poet	
Guy Bolton	United Kingdom	6 September 1979	Playwright	Princess Theatre musicals
John Bradburne	United Kingdom	5 September 1979	Poet, missionary	
David Butler	United States	14 June 1979	Film director, producer, and writer	Road to Morocco, Calamity Jane
Asa Earl Carter	United States	7 June 1979	Genre novelist	The Rebel Outlaw: Josey Wales
Sir George Clark	United Kingdom	6 February 1979	Historian	
Donald Creighton	Canada	19 December 1979	Historian	The Commercial Empire of the St. Lawrence
John Cromwell	United States	26 September 1979	Film director	Of Human Bondage, The Enchanted Cottage
Breece D'J Pancake	United States	8 April 1979	Short story writer	
Christian Dotremont	Belgium	20 August 1979	Painter, writer	Peinture mots
Louis Durey	France	3 July 1979	Composer	
James T. Farrell	United States	22 August 1979	Novelist	Studs Lonigan trilogy
Pedro Flores	Puerto Rico	14 July 1979	Composer	Various ballads and boleros
Lowell George	United States	29 June 1979	Composer	Songs for Little Feat
Nick Grinde	United States	19 June 1979	Filmmaker	
Roy Harris	United States	1 October 1979	Composer	Symphony No. 3
Stuart Heisler	United States	21 August 1979	Film director	
Malcolm Hulke	United Kingdom	6 July 1979	Television writer	Doctor Who
Juana de Ibarbourou	Uruguay	15 July 1979	Poet	
Leigh Jason	United States	19 February 1979	Filmmaker	
Jerzy Jurandot	Poland	16 August 1979	Poet, dramatist	
Joseph Kessel	France	23 July 1979	Journalist, novelist	
Herbert Marcuse	Germany	29 July 1979	Philosopher	Eros and Civilization, One-Dimensional Man
Nicholas Monsarrat	United Kingdom	8 August 1979	Novelist	The Cruel Sea
J. B. "Beachcomber" Morton	United Kingdom	10 May 1979	Humorous newspaper columnist	"By the Way" column for the Daily Express
James Neilson	United States	9 December 1979	Film and television director	
Victoria Ocampo	Argentina	27 January 1979	Publisher, writer, critic	
Park Chung Hee	South Korea	26 October 1979	President of South Korea	Bibliography
Eric Partridge	United Kingdom	1 June 1979	Lexicographer	
S. J. Perelman	United States	17 October 1979	Humorist	Short stories for The New Yorker
Julia Perry	United States	24 April 1979	Composer	
Virgilio Piñera	Cuba	18 October 1979	Poet, short story writer	La isla en peso, Cuentos Fríos, Electra Garrigó
George Pollock	United Kingdom	22 December 1979	Film director	
Nicholas Ray	United States	16 June 1979	Filmmaker and actor	Rebel Without a Cause, In a Lonely Place
Jean Renoir	France	12 February 1979	Film director and writer	La Grande Illusion, The Rules of the Game and other films
Jean Rhys	United Kingdom	14 May 1979	Novelist	Good Morning, Midnight, Wide Sargasso Sea
Richard Rodgers	United States	30 December 1979	Composer	Rodgers and Hammerstein musicals
Nino Rota	Italy	10 April 1979	Composer	Scores for Federico Fellini's films and The Godfather trilogy
Victor Saville	United Kingdom	8 May 1979	Filmmaker	Goodbye, Mr. Chips and Kim
Arno Schmidt	Germany	3 June 1979	Novelist	
Ernest B. Schoedsack	United States	23 December 1979	Film director and producer	The Most Dangerous Game, King Kong
Mary Scott	New Zealand	16 July 1979	Novelist	Breakfast at Six
George Seaton	United States	28 July 1979	Film director	
Lesley Selander	United States	5 December 1979	Film director	
Larisa Shepitko	Soviet Union	2 July 1979	Filmmaker	The Ascent
Jean Stafford	United States	26 March 1979	Short story writer, novelist	The Collected Stories of Jean Stafford
Allen Tate	United States	9 February 1979	Poet, essayist	"Ode to the Confederate Dead"
Norman Tokar	United States	6 April 1979	Film director	
Eugène Vinaver	United Kingdom	21 July 1979	Literary scholar	Edition of Le Morte d'Arthur
John L. Wasserman	United States	25 February 1979	Entertainment critic	
John Wayne	United States	11 June 1979	Actor	Filmography
Darryl F. Zanuck	United States	22 December 1979	Film producer	How Green Was My Valley, All About Eve
Zhou Libo	China	25 September 1979	Novelist, translator	

== Countries with life + 80 years ==
Spain has a copyright term of life + 80 years for creators that died before 1988. In Colombia and Equatorial Guinea, a work enters the public domain 80 years after the creator's death.

Names	Country	Death	Occupation	Notable work
Hervey Allen	United States	28 December 1949	Author	Anthony Adverse
Masaharu Anesaki	Japan	23 July 1949	Historian	History of Japanese Religion
Josef Maria Auchentaller	Austria	31 December 1949	Artist	Bunte Bände
Alice Bailey	United States	15 December 1949	Writer	Works
Hassan al-Banna	Egypt	12 February 1949	imam	Mudhakkirât al-da'wa wa al-dâ'iya
Philip Barry	United States	3 December 1949	Playwright	Holiday
Billy Baskette	United States	8 November 1949	Pianist, composer	Good Bye Broadway, Hello France
H. Bedford-Jones	United States	6 May 1949	Writer	The John Solomon series
Khalil Beidas	Palestine	1949	novelist	Works
Federico Beltrán Masses	Spain	4 October 1949	Painter	
Friedrich Bergius	Germany	30 March 1949	Chemist	Bergius process
Elsa Bernstein	Austria	2 July 1949	Writer	Königskinder
Musa Bigiev	Russia	28 October 1949	Theologian	Selected works
Elisheva Bikhovski	Israel	27 March 1949	Writer, Translator	Simta'ot
Leonard Bloomfield	United States	18 April 1949	Linguist	Selected publications
George Botsford	United States	1 February 1949	Composer	
Robert Boudrioz	France	22 June 1949	Film director, screenwriter	The Man with a Broken Ear
Umberto Brunelleschi	Italy	16 February 1949	Artist, Illustrator	
Guillermo Buitrago	Colombia	19 April 1949	Composer	La Vispera de Año Nuevo
Harry Burleigh	United States	12 September 1949	Composer, singer	settings of spirituals
Helen Churchill Candee	United States	23 August 1949	Writer, feminist	Angkor the Magnificent
Reg Carter	United Kingdom	24 April 1949	Cartoonist	Big Eggo
N. D. Cocea	Romania	1 February 1949	Journalist, Novelist	Vinul de viață lungă
Richard Connell	United States	22 November 1949	Writer	The Most Dangerous Game
Carlo Conti Rossini	Italy	1949	Orientalist	Italia ed Etiopia dal trattato di Uccialli alla battaglia d'Adua
Dorothea Conyers	Ireland	25 May 1949	Novelist	
Will Cuppy	United States	19 September 1949	Humorist	How to be a Hermit
Stoyan Danev	Bulgaria	30 July 1949	Jurist and politician	
Norman Davey	United Kingdom	6 June 1949	Engineer, Writer	The Pilgrim of a Smile
Félix d'Herelle	France	22 February 1949	Microbiologist	Published works
Georgi Dimitrov	Bulgaria	2 July 1949	Politician, revolutionary	Georgi Dimitrov bibliography
Grigoraș Dinicu	Romania	28 March 1949	Composer	Hora staccato
Ali Douagi	Tunisia	27 May 1949	sketch artist	Sahirtu minhu al-layali
Alexander Drankov	Russia; Soviet Union	3 January 1949	photographer, cameraman, film producer	
William Price Drury	United Kingdom	21 January 1949	Writer, soldier, politician	The Flag Lieutenant
Inés Echeverría Bello	Chile	1949	Writer	Entre Deux Mondes
Arthur Eichengrün	Germany	23 December 1949	Chemist	50 Jahre Aspirin
James Ensor	Belgium	19 November 1949	Artist	Christ's Entry Into Brussels in 1889
Herbert Eulenberg	Germany	4 September 1949	Writer	Schattenbilder. Eine Fibel für Kulturbedürftige in Deutschland
August Fischer	Germany	14 February 1949	Orientalist	Arabische Chrestomathie aus Prosaschriftstellern
Victor Fleming	United States	6 January 1949	Film Director	The Wizard of Oz, Gone with the Wind
James Forrestal	United States	22 May 1949	Politician	The Forrestal Diaries
Nikolay Gamaleya	Russia	29 March 1949	Physician, microbiologist	
Henri Giraud	France	11 March 1949	General	Mes Evasions, Un seul but; la victoire: Alger 1942-1944
Hari Singh Gour	India	25 December 1949	Jurist, educator, writer	The Penal Law of India
Martin Grabmann	Germany	9 January 1949	Priest, Historian	Thomas Aquinas: His Personality and Thought
Stanisław Grabski	Poland	6 May 1949	Economist, Politician	
Major Greenwood	United Kingdom	5 October 1949	Epidemiologist	Publications
Joan Lamote de Grignon	Spain	11 March 1949	Composer	La nit de Nadal
George Gurdjieff	Armenia	29 October 1949	spiritual teacher	The Herald of Coming Good
František Halas	Czech Republic	27 October 1949	Poet, translator	
Fritz Hart	United Kingdom	9 July 1949	Composer, conductor	
Syed Zafarul Hasan	Pakistan	19 June 1949	Philosopher	Realism
Kunihiko Hashimoto	Japan	6 May 1949	Composer	Azami no Hana
Will Hay	United Kingdom	18 April 1949	Comedian, amateur astronomer	Through My Telescope
Burton J. Hendrick	United States	23 March 1949	Author	The Life and Letters of Walter H. Page
Johann Jakob Hess	Germany	29 April 1949	Egyptologist	Von den Beduinen des inneren Arabiens
Ludwig Hohlwein	Germany	15 September 1949	Poster artist	
William Jackson Humphreys	United States	10 November 1949	physicist	Bibliography
Otto Hupp	Germany	31 January 1949	graphical artist	Wappen und Siegel der deutschen Städte, Flecken und Dörfer
Douglas Hyde	Ireland	12 July 1949	linguist	The necessity for de-anglicising the Irish nation
Edmond Jaloux	France	22 August 1949	Novelist	Works
Josep Maria Jujol	Spain	1 May 1949	Architect	Casa Batlló, Park Güell
Clarence Jones	United States	1 June 1949	Composer	
Pierre Jouguet	France	9 July 1949	Egyptologist	Works
Unno Juza	Japan	17 May 1949	Writer of science fiction	
Anna Karima	Bulgaria	6 March 1949	Writer and translator	
Selâhattin Kantar	Turkey	17 November 1949	playwright	Kara Dana
Kim Ku	South Korea	26 June 1949	Politician	Diary of Kim Ku
Hans Kindler	United States	30 August 1949	Conductor, cellist, arranger of music	Recordings
Hugh Kingsmill	United Kingdom	15 May 1949	Writer, journalist	
Martin Knudsen	Denmark	27 May 1949	Physicist	The Kinetic Theory of Gases
József Koszta	Hungary	29 July 1949	Painter	Girl with Geraniums
August Krogh	Denmark	13 September 1949	Zoologist	The Respiratory Exchange of Animals and Man
Albert Christian Kruyt	Netherlands	19 January 1949	Ethnographer	The Bare'e speaking Toraja of Central Sulawesi
Lead Belly	United States	6 December 1949	Musician, songwriter	Goodnight, Irene
Vasily Lebedev-Kumach	Russia	20 February 1949	Poet	The Sacred War
Fidelio Ponce de León	Cuba	19 February 1949	Painter	Niňos
Albert Howe Lybyer	United States	1949	orientalist	The Government of the Ottoman Empire in the Time of Suleiman the Magnificent
Carmen Lyra	Costa Rica	13 May 1949	Writer	Cuentos De Mi Tia Panchita
Maurice Maeterlinck	Belgium	6 May 1949	Playwright	Works
René Maire	France	24 November 1949	botanist	Flore de l'Afrique du Nord
Jane Mander	New Zealand	20 December 1949	Novelist	The Story of a New Zealand River
Klaus Mann	Germany	21 May 1949	Novelist	Mephisto
J. C. Mardrus	France	1949	Orientalist	Works
Wilhelm von Massow	Germany	21 April 1949	Archaeologist	Das römische Trier
Elton Mayo	Australia	7 September 1949	Psychologist	Publications
Ibrahim al-Mazini	Egypt	1949	Writer	Spider Webs
Stefan Meyer	Austria	29 December 1949	Physicist	Radioaktivität
Margaret Mitchell	United States	16 August 1949	Novelist	Gone with the Wind
Axel Munthe	Sweden	11 February 1949	Psychiatrist	The Story of San Michele
Khalil Mutran	Lebanon	1 June 1949	poet	
Sarojini Naidu	India	2 March 1949	Poet	Works
Vladimir Nazor	Croatia	19 June 1949	Poet, politician	
Makino Nobuaki	Japan	25 January 1949	Statesman	Makino Nobuaki nikki
Vítězslav Novák	Czech Republic	18 July 1949	Composer	Bouře
Carlos Obligado	Argentina	3 February 1949	Writer, critic	March of the Malvinas
Sidney Olcott	Canada	16 December 1949	Film director	The Pony Express
Francesco Pasinetti	Italy	2 April 1949	Film Director, screenwriter	The Canal of the Angels
Elin Pelin	Bulgaria	3 December 1949	Writer	
Una Pope-Hennessy	United Kingdom	16 August 1949	Historian	Secret Societies and the French Revolution
Camillo Praschniker	Austria	1 October 1949	Archaeologist	Archäologische Forschungen in Albanien und Montenegro
Guillermo Tell Villegas Pulido	Venezuela	25 July 1949	politician	Works
Alfred Rehder	United States	25 July 1949	Botanist	Manual of Cultivated Trees and Shrubs, Hardy in North America
Albert Rehm	Germany	31 July 1949	Classical scholar	Mythographische Untersuchungen über griechische Sternsagen
Gennaro Righelli	Italy	6 January 1949	Film director, screenwriter	Svengali
Tod Robbins	United States	1949	writer	Works
Julius Ruska	Germany	11 February 1949	Orientalist	Al Razi (Rhases) als Chemiker
Antoun Saadeh	Lebanon	8 July 1949	Politician	Nushu' al-Umam
E. Robert Schmitz	France	5 September 1949	Composer	The Piano works of Claude Debussy
Paul Schultze-Naumburg	Germany	19 May 1949	Architect	Die Kunst der Deutschen. Ihr Wesen und ihre Werke
Alexey Shchusev	Russia	24 May 1949	Architect	Lenin's Mausoleum
Nikos Skalkottas	Greece	19 September 1949	Composer	List of compositions by Nikos Skalkottas
G. E. M. Skues	United Kingdom	9 August 1949	Writer, fly fisherman	The Way of a Trout with the Fly
Frank Smythe	United Kingdom	27 June 1949	Mountaineer, author, photographer	The Kangchenjunga Adventure
Edith Somerville	Ireland	8 October 1949	Novelist	The Irish R.M.
Edward Stettinius	United States	31 October 1949	Politician	Roosevelt and the Russians
Herbert Stothart	United States	1 February 1949	Composer, songwriter, conductor	Score for The Wizard of Oz
Richard Strauss	Germany	8 September 1949	Composer	List of compositions
Harry Stack Sullivan	United States	14 January 1949	Psychiatrist	Works
Ali Mahmoud Taha	Egypt	17 November 1949	Poet	Nights of the Lost Sailor, Palestine
Edward Thorndike	United States	9 August 1949	Psychologist	Works
Joaquín Torres-García	Uruguay	8 August 1949	Artist, writer	
Gancho Tsenov	Bulgaria	1949	Historian	
Joaquín Turina	Spain	14 January 1949	Composer	Danzas fantásticas
Uemura Shōen	Japan	27 August 1949	Artist	Jo-no-mai
Sigrid Undset	Norway	10 June 1949	Novelist	Works
Shabbir Ahmad Usmani	Pakistan	13 December 1949	theologian	Fathul Mulhim Sharh Sahih Muslim
Raimond Valgre	Estonia	31 December 1949	composer, musician	
Josef Velenovský	Czech Republic	7 May 1949	botanist	Works
Oswald Garrison Villard	United States	1 October 1949	Journalist, civil rights activist	John Brown 1800-1859: A Biography Fifty Years After
Rosy Wertheim	Netherlands	27 May 1949	Composer	
Elin Wägner	Sweden	7 January 1949	Novelist	The Penholder
Lee "Lasses" White	United States	16 December 1949	Pianist, songwriter, actor	
E. H. Young	United Kingdom	8 August 1949	Novelist and children's writer	
Arthur Leo Zagat	United States	3 April 1949	Writer, lawyer	
Nikola Zhekov	Bulgaria	1 November 1949	General	Memoirs
Oton Župančič	Slovenia	11 June 1949	Writer, translator	Ciciban

== United States ==
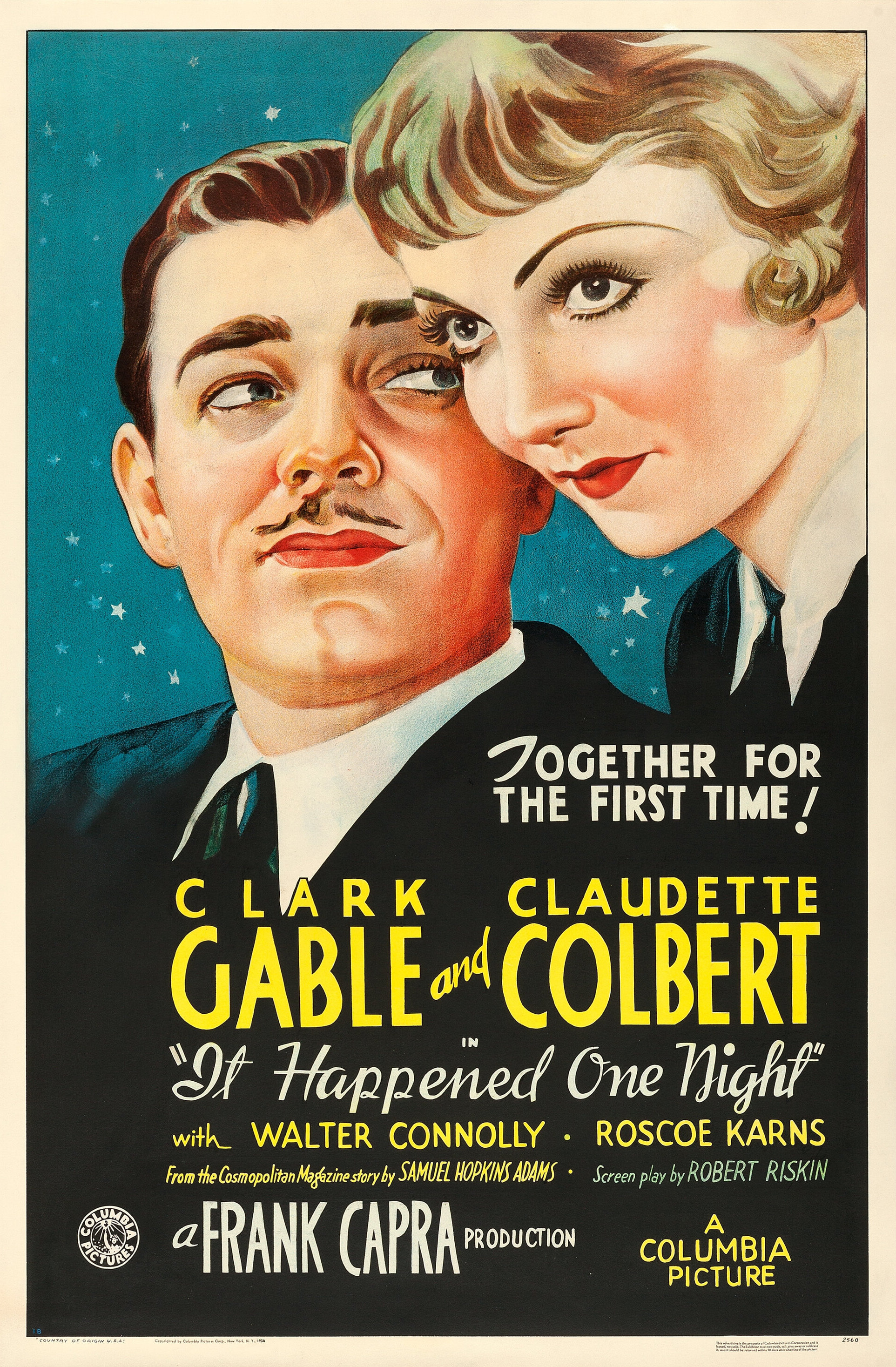
It Happened One Night, one of the final pre-Code Hollywood films and Columbia's first major success, will enter the U.S. public domain in 2030.

Under the Copyright Term Extension Act, books published in 1934, films released in 1934, and other works published in 1934 will enter the public domain in 2030. Sound recordings published in 1929 and unpublished works whose authors died in 1959 will also enter the public domain.

One of the core characters of Disney's animated universe, Donald Duck, will enter the public domain in 2030 through his debut film, the Silly Symphony short The Wise Little Hen, and his first Mickey Mouse series appearance in the cartoon Orphan's Benefit (which introduced the core aspects of his personality as well as his rivalry with Mickey). The latter film's entry will also bring with it the character Clara Cluck and the first appearance of Goofy under his familiar identity. (Note: The character previously appeared as Dippy Dawg in 1932 and 1933.) Also entering the public domain in 2030 is the comic strip character Colonel Blimp; he is one of only a few comic characters from 1934 to do so, as none of the U.S. comic strip characters introduced in 1934 (Li'l Abner, Mandrake the Magician, and Snuffy Smith among several others) had their debut strips copyright renewed.

The most famous feature films entering the public domain in 2030 are Frank Capra's Best Picture Academy Award winner It Happened One Night starring Clark Gable and Claudette Colbert, which is famous for its hitchhiking scene; and the Laurel and Hardy adaptation of Babes in Toyland (also known under its alternative title March of the Wooden Soldiers). Other notable films entering the public domain in 2030 include Capra's other film Broadway Bill, Cecil B. DeMille's Cleopatra, Jean Vigo's L'Atalante, the Alfred Hitchcock films The Man Who Knew Too Much and Waltzes from Vienna, the John Ford films The Lost Patrol, The World Moves On and Judge Priest (the latter starring Will Rogers), Billy Wilder's directorial debut Mauvaise Graine, Sidney Franklin's The Barretts of Wimpole Street starring Norma Shearer and Frederic March, W. S. Van Dyke's The Thin Man and Forsaking All Others, the musical film Stand Up and Cheer! which marked the breakthrough of child actress Shirley Temple, Little Miss Marker (also starring Temple), Victor Fleming's adaptation of Treasure Island, Mark Sandrich's The Gay Divorcee starring Fred Astaire and Ginger Rogers, Lloyd Bacon's Here Comes the Navy, John M. Stahl's Imitation of Life starring Colbert, Rita Hayworth's debut film Cruz Diablo, Howard Hawks and John Conway's Viva Villa! starring Wallace Beery, Gregory La Cava's The Affairs of Cellini, Raymond Bernard's adaptation of Les Misérables, The Three Stooges' first films in their familiar iteration and for Columbia, and the first Dutch sound film William of Orange.

Notable literary works entering the public domain include Agatha Christie's Hercule Poirot mystery novel Murder on the Orient Express as well as her short story collections The Listerdale Mystery and Parker Pyne Investigates, the first English translation of The Death Ship, P. G. Wodehouse's novel Thank You, Jeeves and its sequel Right Ho, Jeeves, F. Scott Fitzgerald's novel Tender Is the Night, John Dickson Carr's mystery novels The Plague Court Murders and The White Priory Murders introducing Sir Henry Merrivale, James M. Cain's novel The Postman Always Rings Twice, Robert Graves' novel I, Claudius, Henry Miller's novel Tropic of Cancer, the script for the Broadway musical Anything Goes, Evelyn Waugh's novel A Handful of Dust, Rex Stout's detective novel Fer-de-Lance introducing Nero Wolfe, Ngaio Marsh's A Man Lay Dead introducing Roderick Alleyn, George Orwell's Burmese Days, the Hardy Boys novel The Mark on the Door, the Nancy Drew mystery story The Clue of the Broken Locket, the first English translation of Mikhail Sholokhov's And Quiet Flows the Don, Hergé's Tintin story Cigars of the Pharaoh as a complete album in its original French black-and-white version as well as the first serialized pages of The Blue Lotus, and Lillian Hellman's play The Children's Hour. Ferdinand Bordewijks controversial antifascistic novel Bint and Simon Vestdijks novel Terug tot Ina Damman in their original Dutch and the first of P. L. Travers' Mary Poppins novels, featuring the more refined version of its titular character, will also enter the public domain. Notable non-fiction books include Webster's New International Dictionary, second edition.

Works of art entering the public domain include Salvador Dalí's painting The Ghost of Vermeer of Delft Which Can Be Used As a Table, Joan Miró's Woman, Amrita Sher-Gil's painting The Little Girl in Blue, Diego Rivera's mural Man, Controller of the Universe, and M. C. Escher's lithograph Still Life with Spherical Mirror, and Jere Miah II's destroyed mural Nightmare of 1934'.

Popular songs entering the public domain in 2030 include "Blue Moon", "Anything Goes", "June In January", "Love In Bloom", "Cocktails for Two", and "The Very Thought Of You". The popular Christmas songs "Winter Wonderland" and "Santa Claus Is Comin' to Town" will also enter the public domain; in the former's case, its entry will exclude the more child-friendly revised lyrics (which would later become the second verse) where the snowman is changed from Parson Brown to a circus clown, which did not appear until 1947.

The original theatrical version of Nina Paley's 2008 film Sita Sings the Blues will enter the public domain; while the film was already in the public domain through a CC0 licence since 2011, however the original soundtrack used 1929 recordings of Annette Hanshaw which were still copyrighted and will enter the public domain in 2030.

== Worldwide ==
The Marc Sleen Foundation, responsible for the estate of Belgian comic book writer Marc Sleen (1922–2016), announced that they will dissolve as a foundation and place all of his works into the public domain on 1 January 2030 through a CC0 declaration. This includes The Adventures of Nero, Piet Fluwijn en Bolleke, De Lustige Kapoentjes, Doris Dobbel, Oktaaf Keunink, and De Ronde van Frankrijk.

The Marc Sleen Museum in Brussels, also run by the foundation, was sold to the Belgian Comic Strip Center.

== See also ==
- List of American films of 1934
- 1934 in literature
- 1934 in music
- 1959 in literature and 1979 in literature for deaths of writers
- Public Domain Day
- Creative Commons
- 2031 in public domain
