= Charles Stanley Nott =

Charles Stanley Nott (1887–1978) was an author, publisher, translator and a student of G. I. Gurdjieff and A. R. Orage. Nott first met Orage, then a student and representative of Gurdjieff, in New York in 1923, when Nott was working at the Sunwise Turn Bookshop. Nott witnessed Orage's first lecture about Gurdjieff, in that bookshop, on January 9, 1924. Gurdjieff arrived in New York soon after, in 1924, and Nott attended Gurdjieff's first demonstration of "sacred dances" and movements, which were part of his teachings.

Nott then spent time at the Institute for the Harmonious Development of Man and became a close student of Gurdjieff. He helped with the publication and distribution of Gurdjieff's first published book The Herald of Coming Good. He wrote two books on his life and experience with Gurdjieff, Orage, and P. D. Ouspensky.

== Early life ==
Nott was born in Bedfordshire, England, and grew up in a Hertfordshire village.

== Publishing ==
Nott had a publishing business in London until the outbreak of World War II. He helped A. R. Orage to start The New English Weekly in 1932.

== Bibliography ==
- The Young Churchill - A Biography, Stanley Nott, 1941, Coward-McCann, Inc. Publishers, New York
- Teachings of Gurdjieff - A Pupil's Journal, C. S. Nott, 1961, Published by Penguin Arkana, 1990, ISBN 0-14-019156-9
- Further Teachings of Gurdjieff - Journey Through This World - Including Account of Meetings with G I Gurdjieff, A R Orage and P D Ouspensky, C. S. Nott, Routledge & Kegan Paul, 1969, ISBN 0-7100-6225-7 (cloth), ISBN 0-7100-8938-4 (paper)
- The Conference of the Birds - Mantiq Ut-Tair, Farid Ud-Din Attar, English Translation by C. S. Nott, First published 1954 by The Janus Press, London, Reissued by Routledge and Kegan Paul Ltd, 1961, ISBN 0-7100-1032-X
