= Ollie Powers =

American jazz drummer and vocalist

Ollie Powers (1890 – April 14, 1928) was an American jazz drummer and vocalist.

== Biography ==
Ollie Powell was born in Louisville, Kentucky, United States.

Louis Armstrong remembered him as a solo entertainer at the Dreamland Cabaret, where he sung Irving Berlin's "What'll I Do" in a powerful, but high and sweet voice. Powers helped Armstrong land a job there before Armstrong left for New York City to play with Fletcher Henderson's Orchestra.

One of his ensembles, named Ollie Powers' Harmony Syncopators, recorded for Paramount Records in 1923. The label released two tracks; "Jazzbo Jenkins" and "Play That Thing." The latter track was recorded four times by the band. From 1926 onwards, he performed with the clarinet player and sometimes bandleader, Jimmie Noone, until shortly before Powers death.

Powers died of diabetes in April 1928 in Chicago, Illinois, United States. During the funeral at Liberty Congregational Church, Armstrong played "Going Home" from Dvořák's New World Symphony.

Both of the Paramount tracks were released in November 2013 on the compilation album, The Rise & Fall of Paramount Records, Vol. 1 (1917-1927).
