= Clarence Jones (musician) =

American jazz musician (1889–1949)

- Also known as: Sultan of Syncopation
- Born: August 15, 1889; Wilmington, Ohio, U.S.
- Died: June 1, 1949 (aged 59) New York, U.S.
- Genres: Jazz, ragtime
- Instrument: Piano

Clarence M. Jones (August 15, 1889 – June 1, 1949) was an American pianist and composer who worked in jazz, ragtime, and other popular music genres. He was known as the 'Sultan of Syncopation'.

== Early life and education ==
Jones was born in Wilmington, Ohio. He studied at the Cincinnati Conservatory of Music and published his first tune, "Lightning Rag", in 1908. In the early 1910s, he moved to Chicago and set up his own publishing studio, writing compositions and creating piano rolls.

== Career ==
He founded his own ensemble, the Select Orchestra, in 1917, which held a residency at Chicago's Owl Theater until 1922. He then moved the show to the Avenue Theater and changed the marquee name to the Wonderful Orchestra, then the Wonder Orchestra, playing at both the Avenue and the Moulin Rouge Cafe, but by 1924 had returned to playing at the Owl. In 1927, the group moved to the Metropolitan Theater and took the names Syncopators and Hot Papas; while resident there, his soloists included Louis Armstrong and J. Wright Smith. In 1928, he moved once again, to the Grand Theater, where he remained until 1932.

Jones recorded jazz between 1923 and 1928, including as a solo pianist for Autograph and backing Monette Moore and Ollie Powers on Paramount. He recorded with his band for Okeh in 1926 and with Laura Smith in 1927 on Victor.

He moved to New York in 1932, where he worked in the publishing house of Clarence Williams. In 1933, he assembled a vocal harmony group called the Southernaires, which recorded in 1939 and 1941 and regularly sang on radio in the 1930s.

Jones died at the age of 59 in June 1949 in New York, but was buried back home in Wilmington's Sugar Grove Cemetery.
