= J. R. Rangaraju =

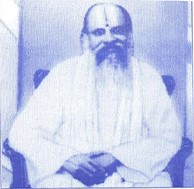
Portrait of J. R. Rangaraju

J. R. Rangaraju (1875-1959) was a best selling Tamil novelist from Madras Presidency, British India. He is considered as one of the pioneers of Tamil fiction writing.

== Biography ==
Jegadhabi Regupathy Rengaraju was born in Paalayamkottai. He started writing detective novels in 1908. He is well known for creating the characters Tiruvellikeni Thuppariyum Govindan (lit. Govindan, the detective from Tiruvellikeni) and Savukkadi Chandrakantha (lit. Chandrakantha who whips). His novels had social reformist themes like exposing the seedy happenings in temples and women's liberation. He wrote a total of eight detective novels. They were reprinted several times and sold thousands of copies. Rajambal saw 23 reprints, Chandrakantha 13, Mohanasundaram 12, Anandakrishnan 10, Rajendran 9 and Varadharajan 2. Taken together, his novels sold more than 70,000 copies. Rajambal was made into a play. It was made into a film twice - in 1935 and 1951. Chandrakantha was made into a film in 1936. He was sued for plagiarizing several parts of Varadharajan and convicted. Besides writing detective fiction, he also served as the editor of the magazine Krishikan that was published in 1910s. He was also a businessman and agriculturist.

His books were nationalised by the Government of Tamil Nadu in 2009.

== Bibliography ==
- Rajambal
- Chandrakantha
- Mohanasundaram
- Anandakrishnan
- Rajendran
- Varadharajan
- Vijayaragavan
- Jeyarangan
