= Haricharan Bandopadhayaya =

Haricharan Bandopadhyaya
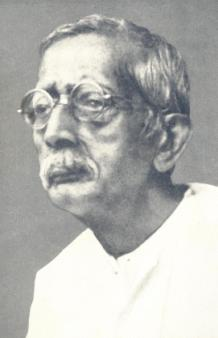
- Indian lexicographer Haricharan Bandyopadhyay
- Born: 23 June 1867; Ramnarayanpur, 24 Parganas
- Died: 13 January 1959
- Occupations: Scholar, dictionary compiler
- Writing career
- Notable awards: Sarojini Basu Gold Medal from Calcutta University; Sisir Kumar Memorial Prize from Calcutta University; Desikottama from Visva Bharati

Haricharan Bandopadhayaya (23 June 1867 – 13 January 1959) was a scholar and lexicographer best known for his 5-volume Bangiya Sabdakosh (Bengali dictionary).

== Early life ==
The son of Nibaran Chandra Bandopadhyaya, he was born in his maternal grand father's house at Ramnarayanpur in 24-Parganas. He had his early education in the schools at Jasaikati (in Baduria)and in Basirhat High School at Basirhat (now in North 24 Parganas), the ancestral village of the family. He joined the Metropolitan Institute, but his studies were disrupted when he was in BA third year as a result of the discontinuation of student's fund. After teaching assignments in his ancestral village and at Narajole, he moved on to the Tagore estate at Patisar, now in Bangladesh.

== Santiniketan ==
Rabindranath Tagore was impressed by his knowledge of Sanskrit and brought him over to Santiniketan. He taught Sanskrit at Brahmacharya Ashram from 1902 till his retirement in 1932. In 1905, Tagore asked him to compile a Bengali dictionary. He started working on this project, whenever, he could find time and it became an all-absorbing occupation for him. It took him 40 years to complete the project. The dictionary, Bangiya Sabdakosh was published in 5 volumes by Visva Bharati in 1945.

== Works ==
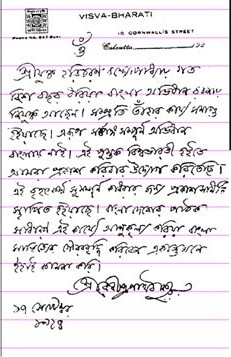
Rabindranath Tagore describing H. Bandopadhyay's contribution as a lexicographer

Bandopadhyaya wrote several books, some of them for use in schools: Sanskrit Pravesh, Pali Pravesh, Byakaran Koumadi, Hints on Sanskrit Translation and Composition, Kobir Katha, Rabindranather Katha etc., He had translated some of the poems of Matthew Arnold.

== Awards ==
He was recipient of the Sarojini Basu Gold Medal and Sisir Kumar Memorial Prize from the University of Calcutta. In 1957, Visva Bharati honoured him with Desikottama. The Desikottama was conferred on him by the Chancellor, Jawaharlal Nehru, who said, "His unwearied pursuit of knowledge fulfils one of the major aims and ideals of Rabindranath and Visva-Bharati."
