= Dominique Dunois =

French writer

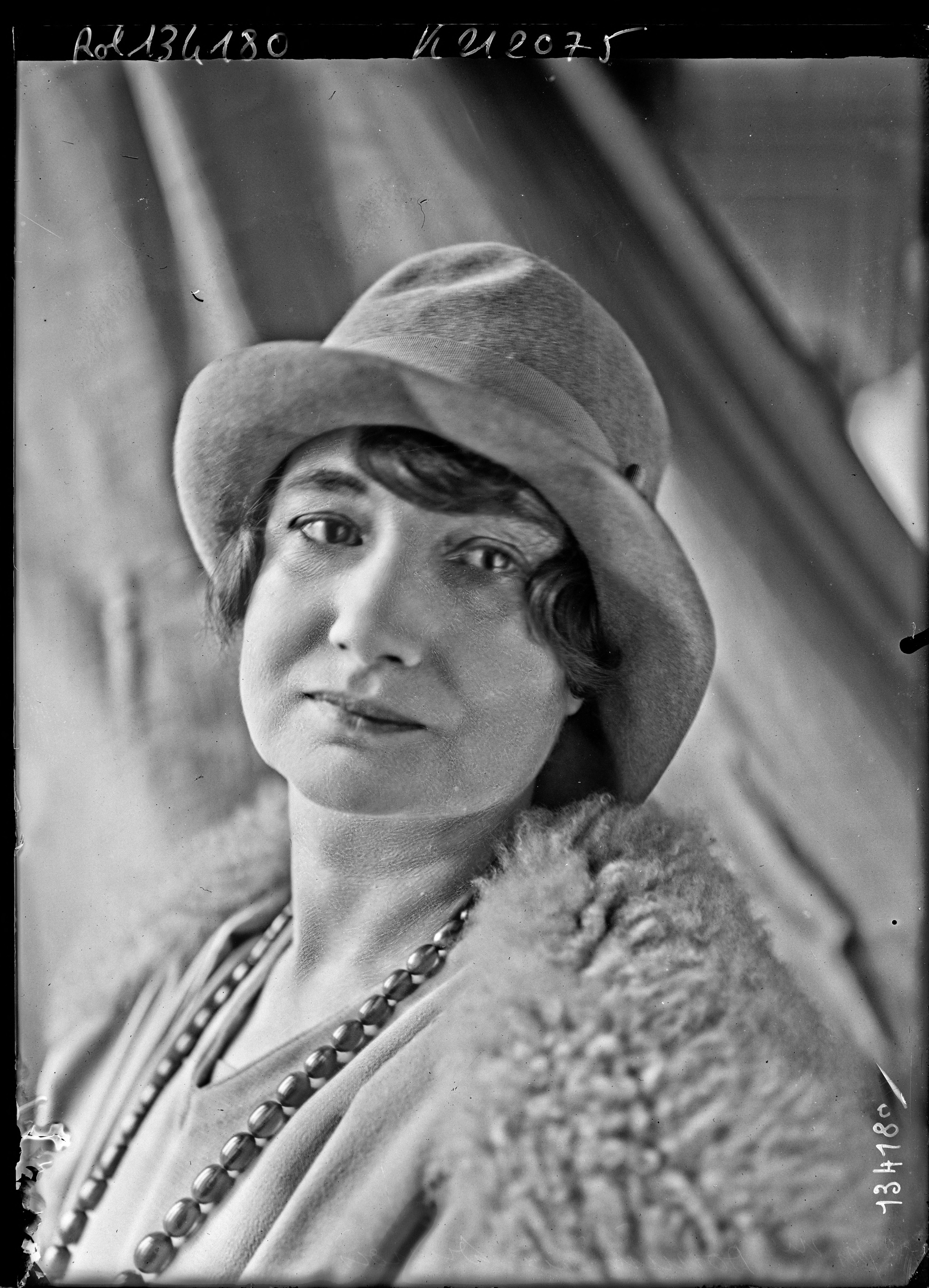
- Dominique Dunois in 1928
- Occupation: Writer

Dominique Dunois (French pronunciation: [dɔminik dynwa]), pen name of Marguerite Lemesle (French pronunciation: [maʁɡəʁit ləmɛl]) was a French writer, winner of the 1928 edition of the Prix Femina.

== Works ==
- 1923: L'Épouse - Calmann-Lévy
- 1924: Le Faune - Calmann-Lévy
- 1925: Lucile, cœur éperdu - Calmann-Lévy
- 1926: Le Pauvre Désir des hommes, collection of short stories - Calmann-Lévy
- 1926: L'Amant synthétique - Calmann-Lévy
- 1927: Leurs deux visages - Calmann-Lévy
- 1928: Georgette Garou - Calmann-Lévy, Prix Femina.
- 1929: Le Bourgeois au calvaire - Fresque des temps nouveaux - Calmann-Lévy
- 1931: La Belle Journée - Calmann-Lévy
- 1932: Suspicion - Flammarion
- 1933: Le Second des Berthault - Flammarion
