= Emilio Biggi =

Paraguayan musician (1910–1969)

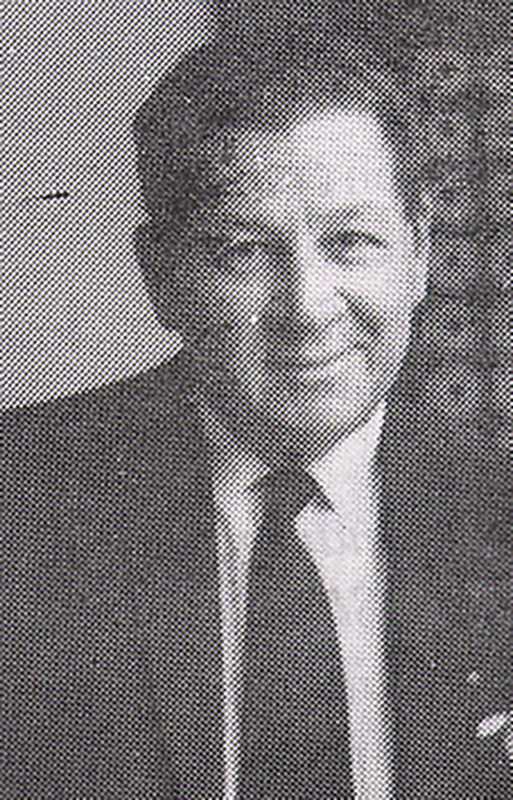
- Emilio Biggi
- Born: Emilio Decio Herculano Bigi; 1 July 1910; Asunción, Paraguay
- Died: 28 May 1969 (aged 58); San Cristóbal, Venezuela
- Known for: Music
- Notable work: "Renacer guarani" (Guarani resurgence) and "Poema sinfónico" (Symphonic poem)

Emilio Decio Herculano Bigi,(1 July 1910 – 28 May 1969) better known by his stage name Emilio Biggi was a Paraguayan was the son of Elisa Bigi and part of the Italian Paraguayan diaspora.

== Early life ==
As a small child, Bigi was part of the Batallón de Exploradores directed by Salesiano priest Ernesto Pérez Acosta.

Bigi attended at the Paraguayan Athaneum music school Bigi where he studied music theory and vocal performance, as well as accordion and, later, bandoneon. He performed in several ensembles, including the popular orchestra of Gerardo Fernández Moreno and the Capital Police Band of Musicians. Bigi was part of the delegation of President Higinio Morínigo, in an official visit to Argentina.

== Career ==
Bigi relocated to Buenos Aires and attended Academy Rubbione, where he continued to study music theory and vocal performance, as well as harmony, counterpoint, and piano. His final thesis was on entitled "Variations about a Guarani subject". Thereafter, he performed for a time with the "Trío Guaireño" led by Gumersindo Ayala Aquino and eventually formed his own group, which became part of the Guarani folk scene in Buenos Aires. In 1952, he went on tour with Ayala Aquino, Carlos Federico Reyes, and Paty de Ayala.

Bigi later moved to San Cristóbal, Táchira, Venezuela, where he worked as a musician and teacher. He served as choir director at the Alberto Adriani Institute and as a professor at the Miguel Angel Espinel school of music, and performed in the state band and the state orchestra of Táchira.

== Family ==
Bigi married Venezuelan Carmen Osorio. The couple had two daughters.

== Death ==
Bigi died on 28 May 1969, in San Cristóbal, Venezuela and was buried there.

== Work ==
Bigi's most well-known classical works are:

- "Cuarteto de cuerdas" (Spring quartet)
- "Aire Nacional Op. 3" (National air Op. 3)
- "Renacer guarani" (Guaraní resurgence)
- "Poema sinfónico" (Symphonic poem)
- "Aires nacionales para piano" (National airs for piano)
- "Canciones" (Songs)

Bigi's most well-known popular works are:

- "Paraguay"
- "El suspiro" (Sigh)
- "Mimby pu"
- "Amanecer" (Sunrise)
- "Achuita"
- "Minero sapukai" (Miner song)
- "Pobre de mi" (Poor me)
- "La canción de mimby" (Mimby's song)
- "Mutilado en la guerra" (Mutilated in war). Lyrics by Rigoberto Fontao Meza.
- "Acosta Ñu". Touching epic song, that enhance the heroism of the martyrs children that fought on 16 August 1869 the battle of the same name, in the last period of the Guerra de la Triple Alianza (War Against the Triple Alliance).
- "Teresita"
- "Por tu cariño, madre" (Because of your love, mother)
