= Diary of Kim Ku =

1947 autobiography of Kim Ku

Paekpŏm ilchi
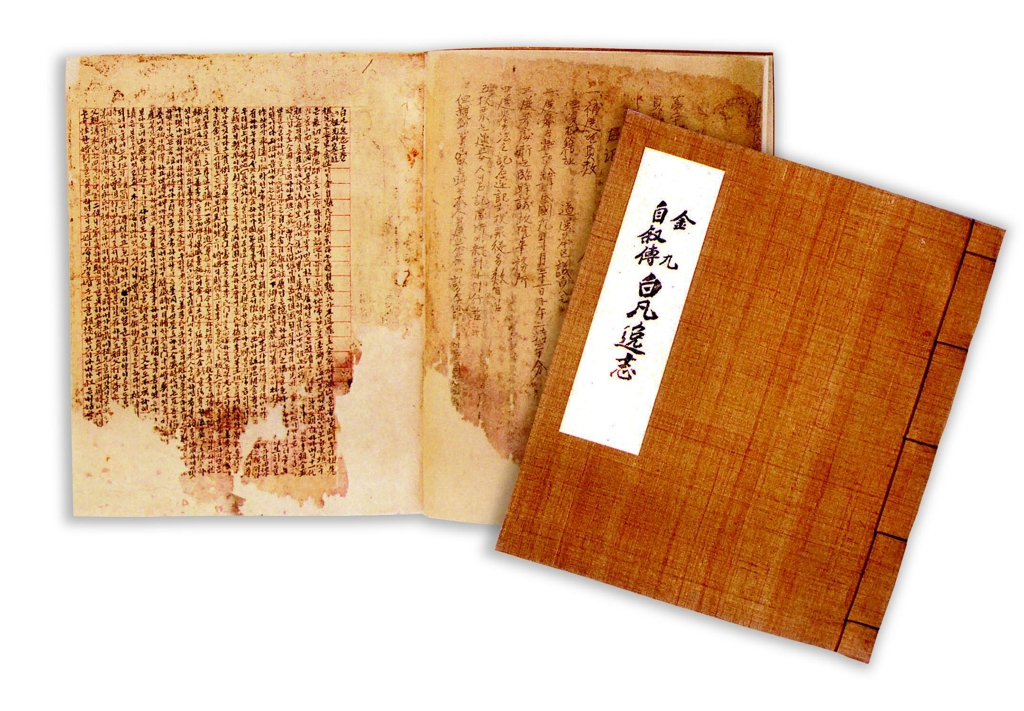
- Original copy
- Author: Kim Ku
- Language: Korean (Hanja and Hangul)
- Release number: 10
- Genre: Autobiography
- Published: December 15, 1947
- Publisher: National Institute of Korean History (1947)
- Publication place: Written in China, published in southern Korea
- Text: Paekpŏm ilchi at Wikisource

Korean name
- Hangul: 백범일지
- Hanja: 白凡逸志
- RR: Baekbeomilji
- MR: Paekpŏmilchi

Paekpŏm ilchi (Note: Also romanized as Paekpŏmilchi, Baekbeom ilji, and Baekbeomilji.) (Korean: 백범일지; Hanja: 白凡逸志), title translated as the Diary of Kim Ku or Diary of Kim Gu, is the Korean-language autobiography of Korean independence activist Kim Ku. It was written in two parts, with the first volume completed in 1929 and the second around 1942. Both volumes were published at once on December 15, 1947.

The book is considered a valuable resource for the study of the Korean independence movement. An original handwritten copy of the book was designated Treasure of South Korea No. 1245 by the South Korean government on 12 June 1997.

== Description ==
It consists of two volumes that were written at different periods of his life. The first volume was completed around 1929, and took around a year and two months to complete. It was originally not intended for widespread publication, as it was dedicated to his sons and focused more on his own life story. The second volume was completed around March 1942, according to Son Se-il's analysis, around 13 years after the first. It covers his life from his arrival in Shanghai in April 1919 until the foundation of the Korean Liberation Army in Chongqing in 1942. This volume was intended for a wider audience, especially because it was written after his children were already grown. The first volume was written using a pen, but the second using a brush, as Kim had grown accustomed to the calligraphy used in official documents of his allies, the Kuomintang.

Kim wrote several copies of the texts and distributed them as gifts to people before the official publication of the book. Both volumes were eventually first published for the general public on December 15, 1947, by the National Institute of Korean History.

== Legacy ==
An original handwritten copy of the book was designated Cultural Treasure No. 1245 by the South Korean government on 12 June 1997. It is considered an important source of study for the Korean independence movement. A quote from the book often called "My Desire" is now considered famous in South Korea.

In 2009, it was translated into Mongolian and distributed to universities in Mongolia.

On 26 February 2019, the musician RM of BTS referenced a quote from the Paekpŏmilchi during an award acceptance speech.
