= Nikolay Gamaleya =

Soviet physician, microbiologist, vaccinologist (1859–1949)

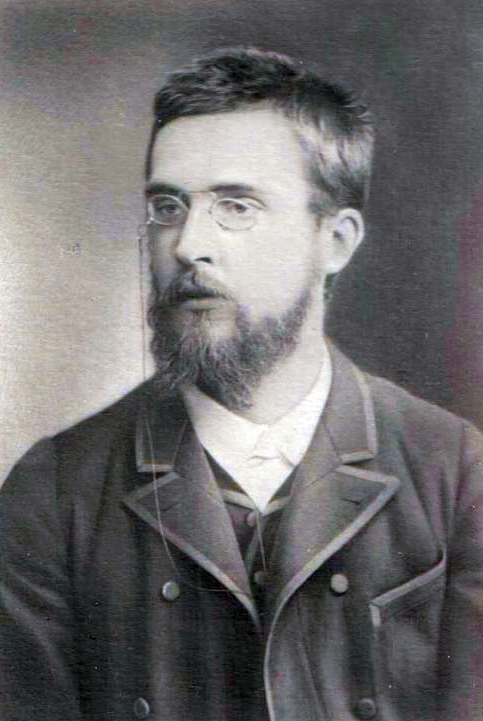
- c. 1900
- Born: 17 February 1859 [O.S. 5 February] Odessa, Russian Empire
- Died: 29 March 1949 (aged 90); Moscow, Soviet union

Nikolay Fyodorovich Gamaleya (Russian: Никола́й Фёдорович Гамале́я; 17 February 1859 [O.S. 5 February] – 29 March 1949) was a Russian, Ukrainian and Soviet physician and scientist of Zaporozhian Cossack origin who played a pioneering role in microbiology and vaccine research.

== Biography ==
Gamaleya was born in Odessa, then part of the Russian Empire, into the family of a retired officer who participated in the Battle of Borodino. He graduated from Odessa's Novorossiysky University (now Odesa University) in 1880 and the St. Petersburg Military Medical Academy (now the S.M. Kirov Military Medical Academy) in 1883. He became a respected hospital physician in his native Odessa afterward.

Gamaleya worked in Louis Pasteur's laboratory in France in 1886. Following Pasteur's model after his return, he joined Ilya Mechnikov in organizing an Odessa bacteriological station for rabies vaccination studies and research on combating cattle plague and cholera, diagnosing sputum for tuberculosis, and preparing anthrax vaccines. The Odessa Bacteriological Institute became Russia's first-ever bacteriological observation station.

Despite the poor facilities and the small staff, the scientists were able to succeed in figuring out the conditions under which the rabies vaccination was most effective. Gamaleya's proposal for using killed bacilli in anti-cholera vaccines was later successfully applied on a wide scale as well. Similar stations were soon founded in Kiev (1886), Yekaterinoslav (1897), and Chernigov (1897).

After defending his 1892 dissertation on the etiology of cholera (published in 1893), Gamaleya served as director of the Odessa Bacteriological Institute in 1896–1908. Reporting of the lysis of Bacillus anthracis bacteria by a transmissible "ferment" in 1898, Gamaleya was the discoverer of the bacteria-destroying antibodies known as bacteriolysins.

Gamaleya initiated a public health campaign of exterminating rats to fight the plague in Odessa and southern Russia and pointed to the louse as the carrier of typhus. In 1910–1913, Gamaleya edited the journal Gigiena i sanitariya (Hygiene and Sanitation).

Gamaleya's later work, including organizing the supply and distribution of smallpox vaccines for the Red Army, made strides toward the eventual eradication of smallpox in the USSR.

The author of more than 300 academic publications on bacteriology, Gamaleya was a member of the Academy of Sciences of the USSR and the USSR Academy of Medical Sciences. He also served as head of the All-Union Society of Microbiologists, Epidemiologists and Infectionists.

The highly regarded Gamaleya's state honors included two Lenin Orders, the Order of the Red Banner of Labour, and the 1943 State Stalin Prize.

Gamaleya died in Moscow.

The N. F. Gamaleya Federal Research Center for Epidemiology & Microbiology in Moscow is named after him.

In Odesa, a memorial plaque is installed on the building of the bacteriological station (2 Pasteur Street) bearing the inscription: “Nikolai Fyodorovich Gamaleya worked at the Odesa Bacteriological Station from 1886 to 1888.”
