= The Pony Express (1907 film) =

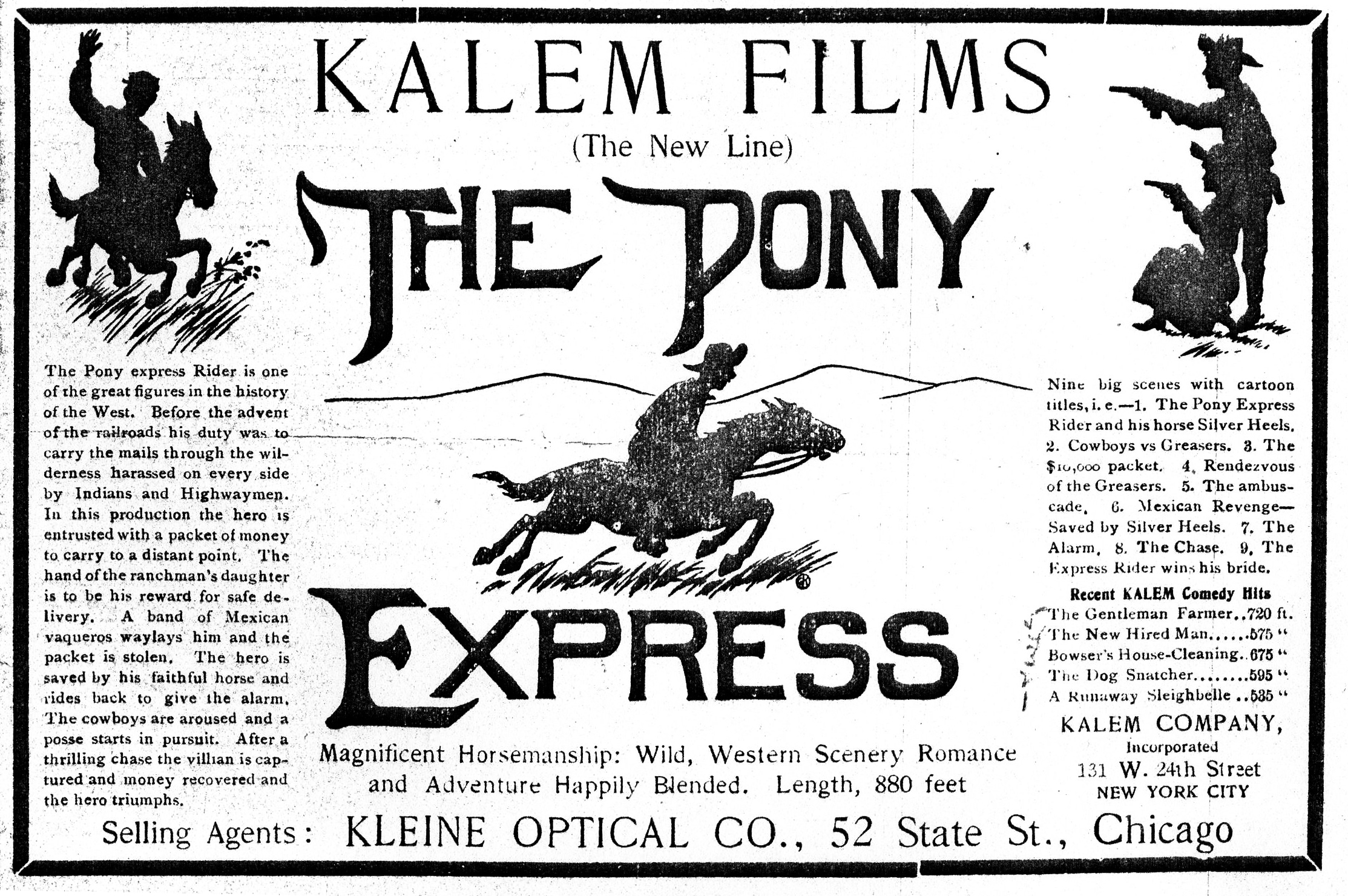
- Advertising published by The Moving Picture World, vol 1 p 226
- Directed by: Sidney Olcott
- Produced by: Sidney Olcott
- Starring: Sidney Olcott; Robert Vignola; Joe Santley
- Production company: Kalem Company
- Release date: June 1, 1907
- Running time: 880 ft
- Country: United States
- Languages: Silent film (English intertitles)

The Pony Express is an American silent fiction film produced by Kalem Company and directed by Sidney Olcott with Sidney Olcott, Robert Vignola and Joe Santley in the leading roles. It was the first movie on the Pony Express.

== Cast ==
- Sidney Olcott
- Robert Vignola
- Joe Santley
- Fred Santley
