= Sargis Abrahamyan =

Armenian writer

- Born: Sargis Abrahamyan; December 28, 1915; Shosh
- Died: June 15, 1969 (aged 53); Stepanakert, Nagorno-Karabakh
- Education: Pedagogical Technical School of Baku, Institute of Pedagogy of Azerbaijan
- Occupations: Pedagogue; Teacher; Writer

Sargis Abrahamyan (Armenian: Սարգիս Աբրահամյան; December 28, 1915, Shosh – June 15, 1969, Stepanakert) was an Armenian writer, pedagogue, cultural figure. He had been a member of the Union of Soviet Writers.

== Biography ==
He was born in (Shoshkend village in Nagorno-Karabakh. He graduated from the Pedagogical Technical School of Baku, and was on the Azerbaijan State Pedagogical University faculty of history (1944). In 1935–1937, he worked in Ning Village's School of Martuni, Nagorno-Karabakh Autonomous Oblast as a history teacher, in 1937–1939 in Ghezghala village's intermediate school of the same town, in 1940 he was a regional counselor of education of people of Martuni. In 1940–1941 he was the counselor of education of people in Azerbaijan's Nagorno-Karabakh Oblast, in 1949–1950, the head teacher of Stepanakert's No.3 school, in 1950–1952, political and scientific knowledge dissemination regional executive secretary, in 1952–1953, the chairman of Marxism-Leninism of Institute of Pedagogy in Stepanakert, in 1954–1955, Head of the Department of Culture of region Soviet of Workers' of Deputies, in 1954–1955, Deputy Chairman of the Executive Committee of the Regional Soviet of Workers' Deputies of the Autonomous Region, in 1955–1957, Regional secretary of Nagorno-Karabakh Central Committee of Azerbaijan, in 1957–1961, Second regional secretary, 1961–1963, Head of the department of culture of regional soviet, in 1963–1969, head of the regional department of provision of film. He was the fifth meeting's deputy of Azerbaijan SSR. Abrahamyan was granted by "Honor Symbol" prize. He died in Stepanakert.

== Sargis Abrahamyan's works of literature ==
- With Generations (novel), book 1, Yerevan, Haypetahrat, 1957, 369 pages.
- Mountain Stream ( consist of S. Abrahamyan's "Star", "Sun-Made", "Red Gillyflowers, "The Honor of Salt and Bread stories), Azerneshr, 1957, 32 pages.
- With Generations (novel), book 2, Yerevan, Haypethrat, 1958, 340 pages.
- Mountain Stream (consist of S. Abrahamyan's "Hasmig" story), Baku, Azerneshr, 1963, 132 pages.
- Our City (novelette), Yerevan, Haypetahrat, 1963, 300 pages.
- In Bends (novelette), Yerevan, "Hayastan", 1967, 219 pages.
- Faithfulness (novel), national publishing house of Azerbaijan 1967, 256 pages.
- Mountain Stream (consist of S. Abrahamyan's works), Baku, Azerneshr, 1967, 96 pages.
- Red Gillyflowers (stories), Baku, national publishing house of Azerbaijan 1973, 128 pages.
