= William Jackson Humphreys =

American physicist and atmospheric researcher

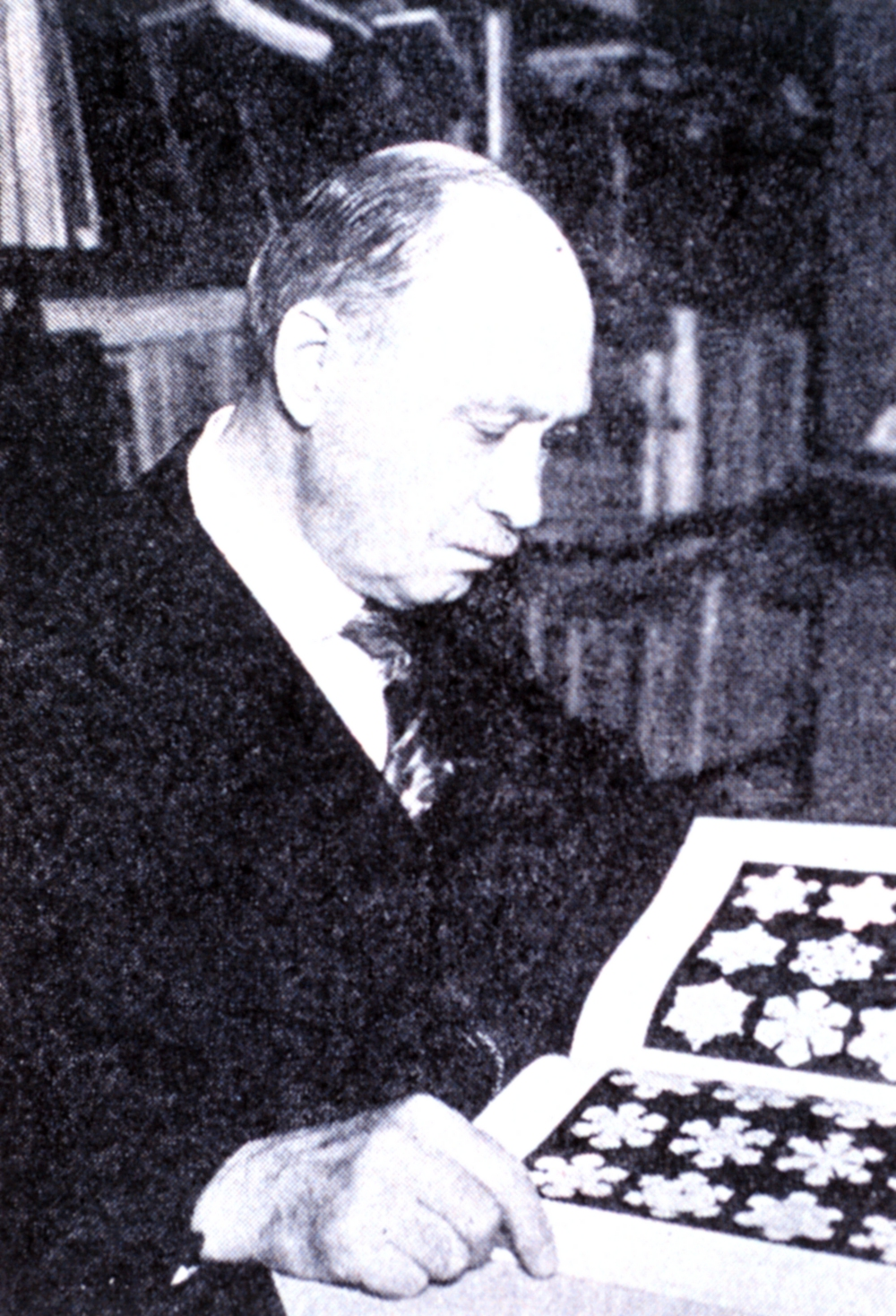
- Born: February 3, 1862; Gap Mills, Virginia
- Died: November 10, 1949 (aged 87); Washington, D.C.
- Scientific career
- Doctoral advisor: Henry Augustus Rowland

William Jackson Humphreys (February 3, 1862 – November 10, 1949) was an American physicist and atmospheric researcher.

== Biography ==
Humphreys was born on February 3, 1862, in Gap Mills, Virginia, to Jackson and Eliza Ann (née Eads) Humphreys. He studied physics at Washington & Lee University in Virginia and later at Johns Hopkins University in Baltimore, where he earned his Ph.D. in 1897, studying under Henry Augustus Rowland.

He worked in the fields of spectroscopy, atmospheric physics and meteorology. In the field of spectroscopy he found the shift of spectral lines under pressure. In atmospheric physics he found a very good model for the stratosphere in 1909. He wrote numerous books, including a textbook titled Physics of the Air, first published in 1920 and considered a standard work of the time, though it was last published in 1940. He also held some teaching positions at universities. In 1913, he proposed that volcanic eruptions might produce subsequent global cooling.

From 1905 to 1935 he worked as a physicist for the U.S. Weather Bureau, predecessor of the National Weather Service. In 1919, he served as president of the Philosophical Society of Washington. He was elected to the American Academy of Arts and Sciences in 1921. In 1924 he was an Invited Speaker of the ICM in Toronto. He was elected to the American Philosophical Society in 1929.

He died on November 10, 1949, in Washington, D.C.

Humphreys at the Fourth Conference International Union for Cooperation in Solar Research at Mount Wilson Observatory, 1910

== Bibliography ==
- Humphreys, W. J. “Volcanic Dust as a Factor in the Production of Climatic Changes.” Journal of the Washington Academy of Sciences 3, no. 13 (1913): 365–71.
- Physics of the Air (1920)
- Weather proverbs and paradoxes (1923)
- Fogs and clouds, The Williams & Wilins Co. (1926)
- Rain making and Other weather vagaries (1926)
- Snow crystals (1931)
