= Johann Jakob Hess (Egyptologist) =

Swiss Egyptologist and Assyriologist

Johann Jakob Hess (also Jean Jaques Hess; Freiburg im Üechtland, (Fr. Fribourg), Switzerland, 11 January 1866 – Zurich, Switzerland, 29 April 1949), was a Swiss Egyptologist and Assyriologist and an expert in other Oriental languages.

== Personal life ==
Hess was born on 11 January 1866, the son of window and door maker Casimir Balthasar Jacques Hess and Josephine-Marie, née Rudolf, in Freiburg im Üechtland, (Fr. Fribourg), Switzerland. He graduated at Berlin and Strassburg in Egyptology, Assyriology, Semitic languages and Sinology, working for his Doctoral degree between 1889 and 1891, working as a Privatdozent, teaching Egyptology and Assyriology between 1891 and 1908 at the Swiss University of Freiburg. This teaching position gave him the opportunity of traveling on leave to Egypt and Nubia for four years settling in Cairo while doing jobs for the British Survey in the British Bureau in Egypt. He returned to Switzerland in 1918, (Orientalisches Seminar - معهد الاستشراق) being promoted to Emeritus Professor in 1936, aged 70. He was married twice and died at Zurich on 29 April 1949, aged 83.

== Some published works by Johann Jakob Hess ==
- Beduinennamen aus Zentralarabien. Heidelberg: Winter, 1912 . Heidelberger Akademie der Wissenschaften: Sitzungsberichte der Heidelberger Akademie der Wissenschaften, Philosophisch-Historische Klasse; Jg. 1912, Abh. 19.
- Von den Beduinen des inneren Arabiens. Zurich, Niehaus Ed. 1938, 177 pages. Edit.: Lieder, Sitten & Gebräuche.
- Der demotische Teil der dreisprachigen Inschrift von Rosette. In German. (English: The demotic language side of the three languages inscribed in the Rosetta Stone). Universitaets-Buchhandlung, B. Veith, 1902 - 99 pages. Available at the Macquarie University, Sydney, Australia, dated 1888. See: http://trove.nla.gov.au/book/result?q&l-decade=188&l-language=Egyptian

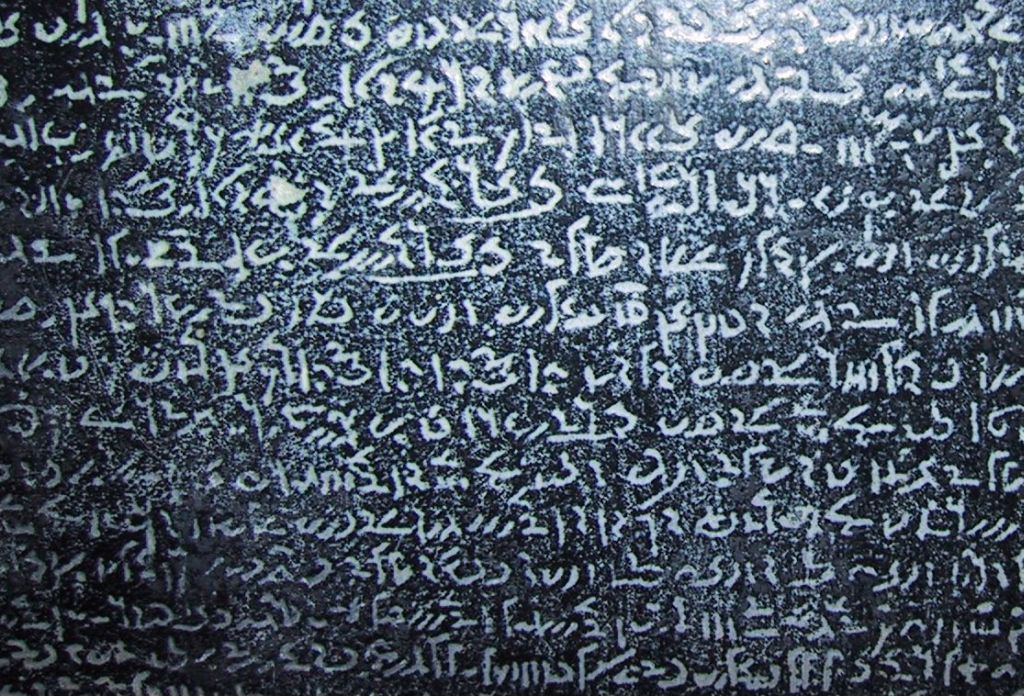
The demotic language scripts on the Rosetta Stone, year 196 BC, under Ptolemy V of Egypt
