= List of compositions by Nikos Skalkottas =

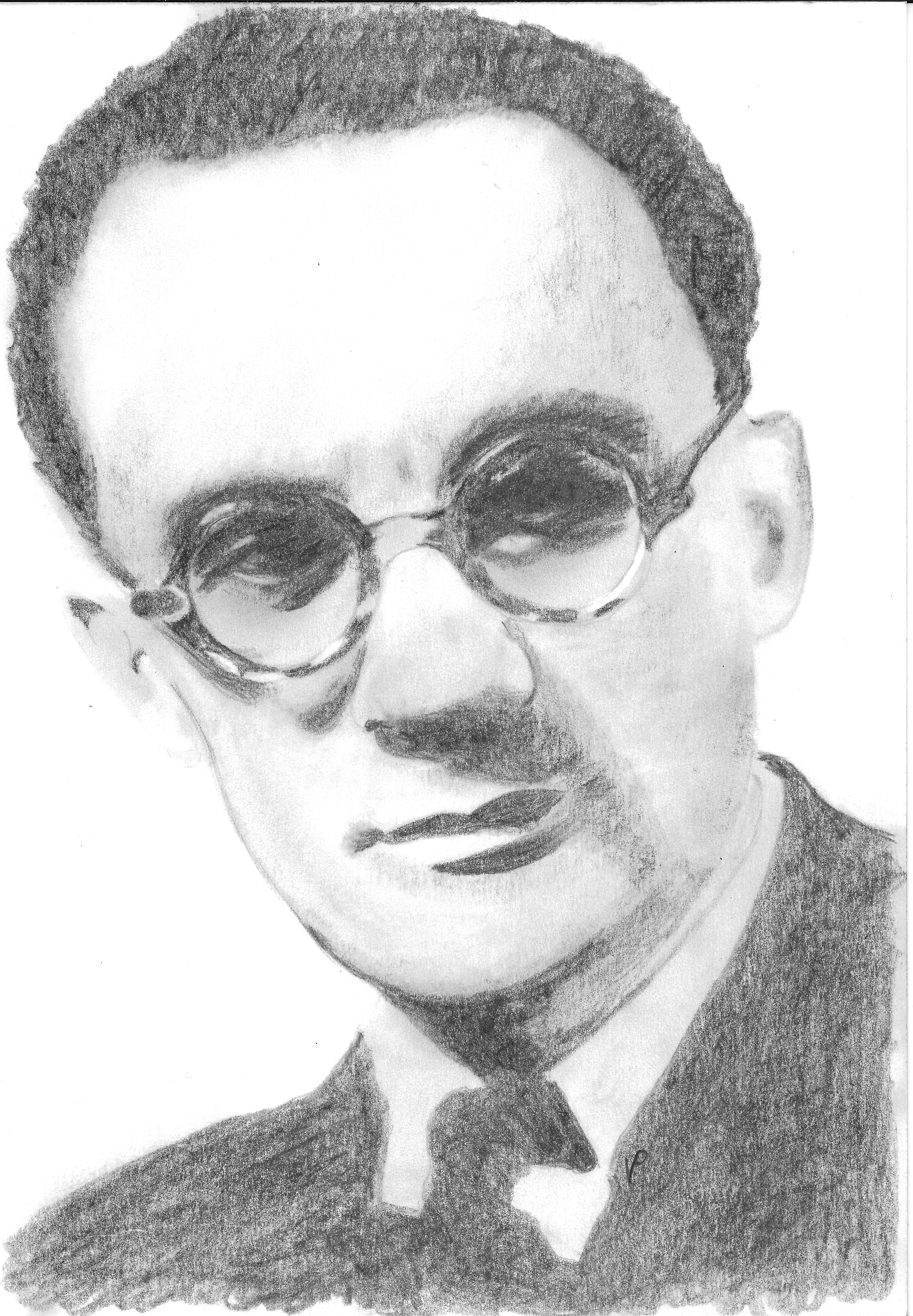
Nikos Skalkottas. Sketch by Véronique Fournier-Pouyet

This is a list of compositions by Nikos Skalkottas.

== The list ==
=== Orchestral works ===
- Symphonic Suite No. 1 (1929)
- 36 Greek Dances (1931–36; new orchestrations of many dances made 1949, and individual numbers arranged for other ensembles – see e.g. String Orchestra)
- Overture (often called Symphony) The Return of Ulysses (c. 1942)
- Symphonic Suite No. 2 (1944–46; 1949; orchestration unfinished; the movements listed have been performed as separate works)
  - 1. Overtüre Concertante
  - 4. Largo Sinfonico
  - 5. Tema con variazioni (orchestration unfinished)
- Classical Symphony for wind orchestra, two harps and double basses (1947)
- Ancient Greek March (1947; in two versions by the composer: small symphony orchestra and wind orchestra)
- Four Images (1948; orchestrated from movements of ballet The Land and sea of Greece)
- Sinfonietta in B-flat minor (1948–9)
- Greek Dance in C minor (1949? – unrelated to the 36 Greek Dances)

=== Concertos ===
- Concerto Grosso for wind orchestra (1928–31; lost)
- Concerto for violin, piano and chamber orchestra (1930)
- Piano Concerto No. 1 (1931)
- Concertino for 2 pianos and orchestra (1935)
- Piano Concerto No. 2 (1937)
- Violin Concerto (1938)
- Cello Concerto (1938; lost)
- Concertino for Oboe and Piano (1939; later adapted for solo oboe and chamber orchestra by Gunther Schuller)
- Piano Concerto No. 3 (1939; for piano and 10 wind instruments)
- Concerto for violin, viola and large wind orchestra (1940–42)
- Double Bass Concerto (1942)
- Concerto for 2 violins (1944–45; not orchestrated)
- Piano Concertino (1948–49)
- Nocturne-Divertimento for xylophone and orchestra (1949)

=== Ballets ===
- The Maiden and Death (1938, revised 1946)
- The Gnomes (1939; partly based on piano pieces by Bartók and Stravinsky)
- Island Images, ballet suite (1943; not orchestrated)
- The Beauty with the Rose (1946)
- The Land and the Sea of Greece (1947–48; not orchestrated except first four movements as Four Images)
- The Sea (1948–49)

=== Works for string orchestra ===
- 3 Greek Dances (1936)
- 7 Greek Dances (1936)
- 10 Sketches (c. 1940)
- Little Suite for strings (1942)

=== Incidental music ===
- Mayday Spell, a Fairy Drama for soprano, speakers and orchestra (1944; 1949)
- Henry V, incidental music for Athens Radio (1947–48)

=== Chamber music ===
- Sonata for solo violin (1925)
- String Quartet (1926; lost)
- String Trio (1926; lost)
- String Quartet No. 1 (1928)
- Sonatina No. 1 for violin and piano (1929; partly lost)
- Sonatina No. 2 for violin and piano (1929)
- String Quartet No. 2 (1929–30; lost)
- Easy Music for string quartet (c. 1930; lost)
- Octet (1931)
- String Trio No. 2 (1935)
- Sonatina No. 3 for violin and piano (1935)
- Sonatina No. 4 for violin and piano (1935)
- String Quartet No. 3 (1935)
- Piano Trio (1936)
- Little Chorale and Fugue for violin and piano (c. 1936)
- March of the Little Soldiers for violin and piano (c. 1936)
- Nocturne for violin and piano (c. 1937)
- Rondo for violin and piano (c. 1937)
- 8 Variations on a Greek Folk Tune for piano trio (1938)
- Gavotte for violin and piano (1939)
- Concertino for Oboe and Piano (1939)
- Scherzo for violin, viola, cello and piano (1936–40)
- Scherzo for violin and piano (c. 1940)
- Largo for cello and piano (c. 1940)
- Menuetto Cantato for violin and piano (c. 1940)
- 10 Sketches for string quartet (or string orchestra) (c. 1940)
- String Quartet No. 4 (1940)
- Duo for violin and viola (1939–42)
- Quartet for oboe, trumpet, bassoon and piano (1940–43)
- Concertino for trumpet and piano (1940–43)
- Tango and Foxtrot, for oboe, trumpet, bassoon and piano (1940–43)
- Sonata for violin and piano (1940–43)
- Sonata Concertante for bassoon and piano (1943)
- Petite Suite No. 1 for violin and piano (1946)
- Petite Suite No. 2 for violin and piano (1946)
- Duo for violin and cello (1947)
- 3 Greek Folksong arrangements for cello and piano (c. 1942–48)
- Bolero for cello and piano (1948–9)
- Tender Melody for cello and piano (1948–9)
- Serenata for cello and piano (1948–9)
- Sonatina for cello and piano (1949)
- Gero Dimos for string quartet (1949)

=== Vocal music ===
- Choral work (R. Stein) on the Unknown Soldier (1930; lost)
- Doe for voice and piano (1931)
- 16 Melodies for mezzo-soprano and piano (1941; texts by Hrissos Esperas)

=== Piano music ===
- Greek Suite (1924–25)
- 15 Little Variations (1927)
- Sonatina (1927)
- Suite No. 1 (1936)
- 32 Piano Pieces (1940)
- 4 Etudes (1941)
- Suite No. 2 (1941)
- Suite No. 3 (1941)
- Suite No. 4 (1941)
- Berceuse (1941)
- Echo (1946)
- Procession to Acheron (c. 1948)
