= Stoyan Zagorchinov =

Stoyan Zagorchinov (Стоян Загорчинов; 1889–1969) was a Bulgarian writer. He is the author of Last Day, God's Day, one of the first social-historical epic novel in Bulgarian literature. Zagorchinov was also an author of plays, essays, portrait pieces, articles and memoirs.

Zagorchinov was born in 1889 in Plovdiv, Bulgaria. It is unknown whether his birth date is 3 December or 3 March. He studied history at Sofia University. Then he continued studies of history and philosophy in Geneva, Switzerland. He graduated from Sofia University with a major in History and French language. During the years 1920–1925 Zagorchinov taught French at the Naval Force School in Varna.

Meanwhile, he took part in the wars between 1912 and 1918. During World War I (1915–18) he served in Kyustendil as an officer-translator at the Army Headquarters. He worked as a bank clerk in Varna (1918–19), a history professor at the Marine Mechanical School in Varna (1920–25) and French at the National Military School in Sofia (1925–49). He collaborated with the magazines "Modern Thought", "Bulgarian Thought", "Hyperion", "Fate", "Art and Criticism", "Art", "Balkan Review" and others.

He died in 1969 in Sofia. It is unknown if the date of his death is 3 January or 31 January.

== Career ==
Zagorchinov develops mainly historical stories, evolving under the influence of Russian literature and French literature. He is the author of the historical legend "The Legend of Hagia Sophia" (1926), the "Last Day, God's Day" ("Otrotsi", "Inatsi", "Yunatsi") (1931–34) the novel "Boyan's Feast" (1950) and "Ivaylo" (1962), which continues the tradition of the Bulgarian historical novel, started by Ivan Vazov. He died on 31 January 1969 in Sofia. In addition to these works, he also wrote a few drama plays:

- 1938 – "The First Tear of Don Giovanni"
- 1943 – "Ilieva's Hand"
- 1950 – The Bajratar
- 1964 – "Mother"
- 1965 – "Forest Traveler", "Love and Feat", "The Captive of the Mundraga".

In 1956, he published the collection of critical Articles and "Fiddles", and in 1966 the memoir "Shadow".

== Notes ==
- From and for Stoyan Zagorchinov in catalogue "NLCB – National Library Catalogue in Bulgaria"
- Stoyan Zagorchinov
