= Norman Davey =

British engineer and writer (1888–1949)

Norman Davey (5 May 1888 – 6 June 1949) was an English engineer, soldier and professional writer.

== Early life ==
Henry Norman Davey was born in Malden in Surrey on 5 May 1888, the son of Henry Davey, a distinguished engineer and inventor, and his wife, Elizabeth Barbenson Le Ber, the daughter of Pierre Barbenson Le Ber, of Alderney, Channel Islands.

He was christened in St John’s Church, Malden, on 19 June 1888.

He attended Ripley Court School between 1900–1904, but thereafter underwent private tuition at home.

In 1907 he went up to Clare College, Cambridge. Although studying natural sciences, he soon began to display his lifelong interest and skill in creative writing. During the Michaelmas term of 1909 he served as co-editor of the university newspaper, Granta, and he achieved prominence as a student poet. He passed in the third class of the Natural Sciences Tripos, part I, and graduated with an honours degree in 1910.

During the following year, 1911, he visited the United States, spending time particularly in Virginia and the Carolinas. Then, returning to England, it seems he prepared to become a qualified and practising engineer. In June 1911 his father, acting on his behalf, had submitted an application for him to be elected as a Graduate of the Institution of Mechanical Engineers. He himself sat, and passed, the examinations for associate membership of the Institution of Civil Engineers in February 1912.

== Engineer and soldier ==
Davey's father was a well-known engineer, and it is difficult to escape the conclusion that in going into the engineering profession he was conforming to his father's expectations. His sustained interest lay in writing. A somewhat patronising obituary in The Engineer commenced with the words, "Norman Davey will be remembered by those who have passed their meridian as the author of several light books well known in their day," and went on to assert, "the only engineering work he did was the writing for this journal of two series of articles, which subsequently appeared in book form."

At all events, in January 1914 he submitted an application to the British Patent office for a patent for a mixed fluid gas turbine, and later that same year, his book, The Gas Turbine made its appearance, to favourable notices, such as,

"This book is unquestionably the most comprehensive treatise on the gas turbine that has been published in the English language. … [This] interesting and comprehensive work by Mr. Davey is of especial interest."

He was still travelling, studying and writing, however. During the year, 1914, he attended lectures at the Université de Montpellier in France, and his first novel, Perhaps: A Tale of To-morrow, was accepted for publication by Methuen and Company.

There is no clear evidence that this book was issued to the public, perhaps because of the onset of war, but it was advertised in the list of "Methuen's Popular Novels" for Autumn, 1914, scheduled for issue in September 1914, together with a synopsis of the plot.

Great Britain's entrance into the First World War in August 1914, changed the course of Davey's life. On 6 October 1914 he attested for service in the Territorial Force as a Sapper in the London Electrical Engineers, Royal Engineers. In November he completed an "Application for Appointment to a Temporary Commission in the Regular Army for the Period of the War," and he was appointed and commissioned as a temporary second lieutenant in the Royal Garrison Artillery on 5 December 1914. After little more than a month, on 20 January 1915, he was transferred to the Royal Engineers. He crossed to France on 14 September 1915.

Initially he served with the Signal Service on operations in France and Flanders, describing himself as "The Only Subaltern Who Has Instructed The Director of Army Signals in the Use of the Telephone" in a humorous article entitled "The Telephone at the Front," which appeared in Punch in November 1915. He was posted to Fifth Army Signals after that formation came into existence, and, later in the war, to General Headquarters, British Armies in France, to do duty on attachment with General Staff (Training). He returned to England in June 1918, where, after a prolonged period of ill-health, he served as a General staff Officer, 3rd Grade, under the Assistant Director of Staff Duties (Education) at the War Office, with the rank of captain. He was demobilised and released from the Army in March 1919.

He was mentioned in despatches in April 1917, and favourably referred to by Lord Gorell in his book, Education and the Army.

== Professional writer ==
Although Davey was elected as an Associate Member of the Institution of Civil Engineers in March 1919, he spent the post-war years travelling in Italy and France, and writing. Within a few years a note appeared in T.P.'s and Cassell's Weekly that, "being a wanderer by instinct and inclination, [he] is a frequent visitor to Italy, but he has a pied-a-terre at Ewell, in Surrey." His note, "Italian Water Turbines," appeared in The Engineer in November 1919.

Four of his poems appeared in 1920 in Cambridge Poets 1914–1920. An Anthology, and that same year saw the publication of his own volume of poems, Desiderium, MCMXV-MCMXVIII. Then, in 1921, appeared what was unquestionably to be his most successful achievement, the novel, The Pilgrim of a Smile.

The book was at once well-received, one critic remarking,

"Mr. Norman Davey’s book of short stories—stories of the adventures of that quiet gentleman Mr. Matthew Sumner— are in the best tradition of Stevenson and Mr. Chesterton. We do not mean that Mr. Davey is a copyist, for the Stevensonian seam is a rich one and the master himself by no means exhausted it. Mr. Davey, in adopting the same careful, ornately simple style and many of the same methods for the production of his surprise, is well within his rights. One of the most delightful things about this book is that many of the adventures related are adventures not of the body but of the spirit."

The book has been reprinted many times since its first publication, appearing as a Penguin Book in 1936.

Ten novels were to follow The Pilgrim of a Smile, but few of them were regarded with quite as much admiration. His very next book, for example, was roughly treated:

"Most of Mr. Norman Davey’s readers will expect a good deal from a full-length novel by the author of The Pilgrim of a Smile; they will be disappointed."

Two of his non-fiction titles received good notices, however. Studies in Tidal Power, an engineering work, which was published in 1923, and the travel guide, The Hungry Traveller in France, which appeared in 1931.

== Marriages, retirement and death ==
Davey was married on 7 September 1926 in the British consulate in Marseille, France to Violet Ada Lucy Fergusson (the only daughter of John Henry Fergusson of Crochmore, Dumfriesshire in Scotland. She was born on 14 July 1902.) The marriage was dissolved by divorce. (Mrs Davey was afterwards married in Nice in France to Major J.G.E.D. Montagu.)

He was married, secondly, in Nice to Mrs Maud Christobel ("Sally") Lynch (née Beeby) (the widow of John Gilbert Bohun Lynch, who died in 1928).

After the Second World War, Davey and his wife retired to live in Diano Marina in Italy. Davey died there, aged 61 years, "after a long illness," on 6 June 1949.

He left effects in England of £3509.

His widow, Sally Davey, died, aged 76 years, in Diano Marina on 20 November 1963.

== Publications ==
- The Gas Turbine (London: Constable and Co., and New York: D. van Nostrand and Company, 1914)
- Desiderium, MCMXV-MCMXVIII (Cambridge: W. Heffer & Sons Ltd., 1920)
- The Pilgrim of a Smile [a Matthew Sumner novel] (London: Chapman and Hall, 1921)
- Guinea Girl: A Melodrama in Three Acts (London: Chapman and Hall, 1921)
- Good Hunting (London: Chapman and Hall, 1923)
- Studies in Tidal Power (London: Constable and Co., 1923)
- Yesterday: A Tory Fairy-Tale (London: Chapman and Hall, 1924)
- The Penultimate Adventure [a Matthew Sumner novel] (London: Elkin Mathews, 1924)
- Babylon and Daylight (London: Chapman and Hall, 1927)
- Judgment Day (London: Constable, 1928)
- The Hungry Traveller in France (London: Jonathan Cape, 1931)
- The Pilgrim of a Smile [an assemblage of the two Matthew Sumner novels] (London: Chapman and Hall, 1933)
- King, Queen, Knave (London: Grayson and Grayson, 1934)
- Pagan Parable: An Allegory in Four Acts (London: Grayson and Grayson, 1936)
- Cats in the Coffee (London: Chapman and Hall, 1939)
- The Ghost of a Rose (London: Chapman and Hall, 1939)
