= Albert Howe Lybyer =

American scholar (1876–1949)

Albert Howe Lybyer (1876 in Putnamville, Indiana – 1949) was a scholar of the history of the Middle East and the Balkans. Lybyer taught medieval and modern European history at Oberlin College from 1909 to 1913, and also held teaching positions at Robert College of Istanbul (1900–1906), Harvard University (1907–1909) and the University of Illinois (1913–1944). He served as a technical advisor to the King–Crane Commission in 1919.

The book The Government of the Ottoman Empire in the Time of Suleiman the Magnificent was his most influential work.

He gave manuscript feedback to Barnette Miller for her 1931 book Beyond the Sublime Porte on the Turkish seraglio.

He graduated from Princeton University and Harvard University.
