= Edmond Jaloux =

French novelist, essayist, and critic

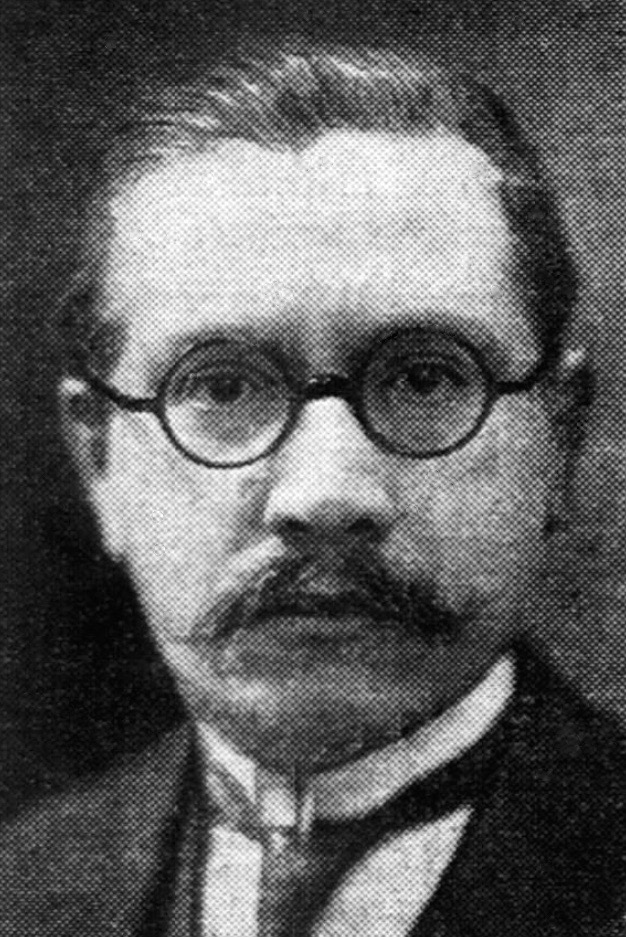
Edmond Jaloux in 1936

Edmond Jaloux (19 June 1878, Marseille – 22 August 1949, Lutry) was a French novelist, essayist, and critic. His works tended to be set in Paris or his native Provence. He was interested in German Romanticism and English writers. In 1936 he joined the Académie française. He died in Switzerland in 1949.

== Bibliography ==
- Une âme d'automne (1896)
- L’Agonie de l'amour (1899)
- Le Triomphe de la frivolité (1903)
- Les Sangsues (1904)
- Le Jeune Homme au masque (1905)
- L’École des mariages (1906)
- Le Démon de la vie (1908)
- Le Reste est silence (Prix Femina, 1909)
- L’Éventail de crêpe (1911)
- Fumées dans la campagne (1918)
- L’Incertaine (1918)
- Les Amours perdues (1919)
- Au-dessus de la ville (1920)
- Vous qui faites l'endormie (1920)
- La Fin d'un beau jour (1920)
- L’Escalier d'or (1922)
- Les Barricades mystérieuses (1922)
- Les Profondeurs de la mer (1922)
- L’Esprit des livres, 7 volumes (1922)
