= Georgi Dimitrov bibliography =

Collection of Georgi Dimitrov's speeches and writings

Georgi Dimitrov (June 18, 1882 – July 2, 1949) was a Bulgarian communist politician. He was the first communist leader of Bulgaria, from 1946 to 1949. Dimitrov led the Comintern (Communist International) under Stalin from 1934 to 1943. He was a theorist of capitalism who expanded Lenin's ideas by arguing that fascism was the dictatorship of the most reactionary elements of financial capitalism.

This is a Georgi Dimitrov bibliography, including writings, speeches, letters and others.

== Writings ==
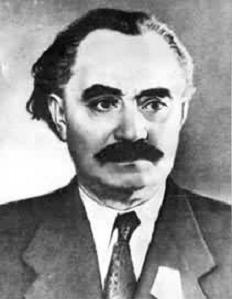
Dimitrov in the 1930s

The following list contains his writings that are available online, most of them in the Georgi Dimitrov Internet Archive:

Writing	Year	Text
After May Day	1906	English
The Need of Trade Unions in Bulgaria and Their Organization	1907	English
Bulgaria's Economic Development	1910	English
The Budapest Resolution	1911	English
Towards Unity	1914	English
Against Military Credits	1914	English
The Significance of the Second Balkan Conference	1915	English
The Small Nations	1917	English
The Right Road	1918	English
No Pardon, but Amnesty	1918	English
Lenin to the Workers in Europe and America	1919	English
The Tasks of the Trade Unions	1920	English
Third Anniversary of the Russian Revolution	1920	English
The Revolutionary Trade Union Movement in the Balkans	1923	English
The Trade Union Movement in Bulgaria	1923	English
The United Workers' Front	1923	English
Five Years: The Bulgarian Communist Party and the Communist International	1924	English
The European War and the Labour Movement in the Balkans	1924	English
Dimitrov vs. Göbbels	1933	English
The Fascist Offensive and the Tasks of the Communist International	1935	English
Unity of the Working Class against Fascism	1935	English
Youth Against Fascism	1935	English
The People's Front	1935	English
Fascism is War	1937	English
Notes on the Chinese Question	1937	English
The United Front: The Struggle Against Fascism and War	1938	English
Policy Declaration of the New Fatherland Front Government	1946	English
People of Bulgaria in the Struggle for Democracy and Socialism	1948	English
The October Socialist Revolution Opened for Mankind the Road to Real Democracy and Socialism	1948	English
Concluding Speech before the 5th Congress of the BCP	1948	English
Selected Works in Three Volumes	1978	English

== Speeches ==
Speech	Year	Transcript
Speech on the Chinese Question	1936	English
Speech on the Chinese Question	1937	English

== See also ==
- Marxist bibliography
