= The Herald of Coming Good =

1933 book by G. I. Gurdjieff

The Herald of Coming Good. First Appeal to Contemporary Humanity is the first book published by G. I. Gurdjieff. The book was privately published in Paris in 1933. The book was published with the help of Charles Stanley Nott, a student of Gurdjieff.

== Structure ==
In addition to the main body of the text, the book contains the following sections:

- A message from The Author
- My First Practical Counsel
- Circular Letter
- A Supplementary Announcement
- A number of Registration Blanks

== Contents ==
Gurdjieff refers to The Herald of Coming Good Book as "... this first of my writings intended to head the list of my publications ...". It is a programmatic essay, describing the author's anthropological world view and his ethical concept of a full realization of mankind with reference to the activities of his organization, the Institute For Man's Harmonious Development.

The book contains an outline of all his other writings, All and Everything, consisting of "ten books in three series".
