= Rosy Wertheim =

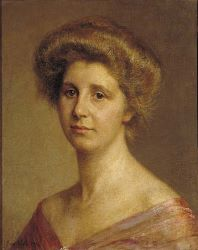
Rosy Wertheim by Jan Veth.

Rosy Wertheim (19 February 1888 – 27 May 1949) was a Dutch pianist, music educator and composer.

== Biography ==
Rosalie Marie Wertheim was born in Amsterdam to parents John and Adriana Rosa Gustaaf Wertheim Enthoven. Her father was a banker and Rosalie attended a French boarding school in Neuilly, where she took piano lessons. She studied piano with Ulfert Schults and harmony and counterpoint with Bernard Zweers and Sem Dresden. In 1921 she took the state exam in piano and graduated from the Nederlandse Toonkunstenaars Vereniging.

From 1921 to 1929, she taught at the Amsterdam Music Lyceum, composed songs and choral works and conducted children's and women's choirs. In 1929 Wertheim moved to Paris, where she lived for six years, composing music and writing for the Amsterdam newspaper Het Volk on the Parisian music scene, while studying composition and instrumentation from the composer Louis Aubert. In 1935 she moved to Vienna, where she studied counterpoint with Karl Weigl. In 1936 she traveled to New York City to give lectures and arrange performance of her works.

In 1937, just prior to the start of World War II, she returned to Amsterdam. During the German Occupation, Wertheim gave secret concerts in a cellar where she played music by banned Jewish composers. After September 1942, she went into hiding to escape the Jewish deportations. After the war, Rosy Wertheim taught at the Music School in Laren, but contracted a serious illness and died May 27, 1949, in Laren, the Netherlands.

== Works ==
Wertheim composed over ninety works, and her compositions were described as "cheerful, neo-classical and at times playful."

Selected works include:

- Lanceloet; Drie voorspelen (for string orchestra, undated)
- Trois Morceaux for flute and piano, 1939
- Trois Chansons for soprano, flute and harp, 1939
- Cello Sonata (around 1921)
- Concerto per pianoforte e orchestra (1940)
- Divertimento for chamber orchestra (undated)
- Six Morceaux for piano solo (undated)
- Trio for flute, clarinet and bassoon (undated)
- Quatuor à cordes (undated)

== Recordings ==
Lanceloet - conducted by Shelley Katz (link: https://suppressed-music.com/rosy-wertheim-lanceloet-drie-voorspelen/)
