= Dorothea Conyers =

- Born: Dorothea Spaight Blood-Smith; 11 November 1869; Fedamore, County Limerick
- Died: 25 May 1949 (aged 79); Limerick

Dorothea Conyers (11 November 1869 – 25 May 1949) was an Irish novelist. Her books are romantic novels set among the Irish sporting gentry. Her output numbered some 40 titles.

== Life ==
Dorothea Conyers was born Dorothea Spaight Blood-Smith in Fedamore, County Limerick on 11 November 1869. She was one of twin daughters of Colonel John Blood-Smith and Amelia Blood-Smith (née Spaight). Her family were part of the Protestant landed gentry, but the family fortunes declined after the death of her father when she was very young. Writing about her childhood, she was aware of the social and political upheaval in Ireland, which saw the family targeted by vandalism.

She married Lieutenant-colonel Charles Conyers in February 1892. He was from Castletown Conyers, County Limerick, and they had two children, a son and a daughter. They lived in a number of places across Ireland and England. He was a member of the Royal Irish Fusiliers, and was killed fighting in May 1915. Conyer's remarried in 1917, to Captain John White from Nantenan, Ballingrane, County Limerick, where she lived for the rest of her life.

Conyer's first novel, The thorn bit, was published in 1900. This was followed by more than 40 novels and collections, with her last book, Kicking foxes, published in 1948. Her books are romantic novels set within the Irish sporting gentry. She herself was a keen sportsman. She died in Limerick on 25 May 1949 and is buried in St Mary's (COI) Cathedral cemetery in Limerick city. Some of her papers are held in the William Andrews Clark Memorial Library, UCLA.

== Selected works ==
- Peter's pedigree (1904)
- The boy, some horses and a girl (1908)
- The conversion of Con Cregan (1909)
- Lady Elverton's Emeralds (1909)
- For Henri of Navarre (1911)
- Sporting Reminiscences (1920)
- The Two Maureens (1924)
- Bobbie (1928)
- A lady of discretion (1939)
