= Olivia FitzRoy =

British author of children's books

Olivia Gwyneth Zoe FitzRoy, (27 May 1921 – 24 December 1969) was a British author of children's books. She was the granddaughter of Muriel FitzRoy, 1st Viscountess Daventry, raised to the peerage as widow of Edward FitzRoy, the Speaker of the House of Commons from 1928 until his death in 1943; her mother was a member of the famous Guinness family. Olivia FitzRoy was one of five sisters.

The family spent their summers in Scotland, the setting of her books. They were there in 1939 when her father, a naval officer, decided that they should remain in Inverewe for the duration of World War II. The area was remote; FitzRoy wrote her first book, Orders to Poach (which told the story of the Stewart children receiving unusual instructions from their overseas father) to entertain her two younger sisters, Barbara (now Ormrod) and the late Amelia (now Jessel). It was published by Collins, as Billy Collins was a friend of the family. The second, Steer by the Stars and the third The House in the Hills, were based in the same location.

FitzRoy carried on writing when she began service in the Women's Royal Naval Service, though she was stationed as far away as Ceylon. After the war, she travelled with the 'Chipperfield Circus', which was the inspiration behind Wagons and Horses; she then went back to live in Scotland.

Olivia FitzRoy married Sir Geoffrey Bates in 1957 and they had two daughters. She died aged only 48 of cancer in 1969.

Her books are being reissued by Fidra Books: the first became available in June 2006, the second in March 2007 and the third in 2009.
