= Camillo Praschniker =

Austrian archaeologist (1884–1949)

Camillo Praschniker (13 October 1884, Vienna – 1 October 1949, Vienna) was an Austrian archaeologist.

He studied classical philology and archaeology at the universities of Innsbruck, Vienna and Berlin. At Berlin, his instructors were Reinhard Kekulé von Stradonitz, Hermann Winnefeld, Ulrich von Wilamowitz-Moellendorff and Heinrich Wölfflin. From 1908 to 1910, via a travel grant from the Austrian Archaeological Institute (ÖAI), he conducted research in Italy, Greece and Asia Minor. In 1912 he was named secretary of the ÖAI.

In 1913/14, on behalf of the Austrian Academy of Sciences, he did excavations in Palestine (Shechem, Nablus) with German theologian Ernst Sellin. In 1916 he participated in an archaeological expedition to Albania and Montenegro. In 1922 he became an associate professor at the University of Vienna, and during the following year, succeeded Wilhelm Klein as professor of archaeology at the German University of Prague (dean 1929/30). In 1926/27 he returned to Palestine, and performed additional excavatory work with Ernst Sellin at Shechem. After a short stay at the University of Jena (1930), he returned to Vienna, where in 1934 he replaced Emil Reisch as professor and director of the archaeological and epigraphic seminar at the university. In 1935 he was named honorary director of the Austrian Archaeological Institute.

In 1933 and 1935 he took part in excavations at Ephesus, and from 1935, was involved in archaeological work in Carinthia. With architect Max Theuer, he conducted investigations of the Belevi Mausoleum in Turkey.

== Selected works ==
- Archäologische Forschungen in Albanien und Montenegro (with Arnold Schober), 1919 – Archaeological research in Albania and Montenegro.
- Muzakhia und Malakastra; archäologische Untersuchungen in Mittelalbanien, 1920 – Muzakhia and Malakastra; archaeological research in central Albania.
- Kretische Kunst, 1921 – Cretan art.
- Parthenonstudien, 1928 – Parthenon studies.
- Zur geschichte des Akroters, 1929 – The history of the acroteria.
- Die Versuchsgrabung 1948 auf dem Magdalensberg, 1949 – The excavation in 1948 at Magdalensberg.
