= József Koszta =

Hungarian painter

- Born: József Koszta; 27 March 1861; Brassó, Hungary
- Died: 29 July 1949 (aged 88); Budapest, Hungary
- Movement: Realism

József Koszta (27 March 1861 – 29 July 1949) was a Hungarian painter whose major works include Girl with Geraniums, Corn Snappers and Woman Drying Plates.

== Life ==
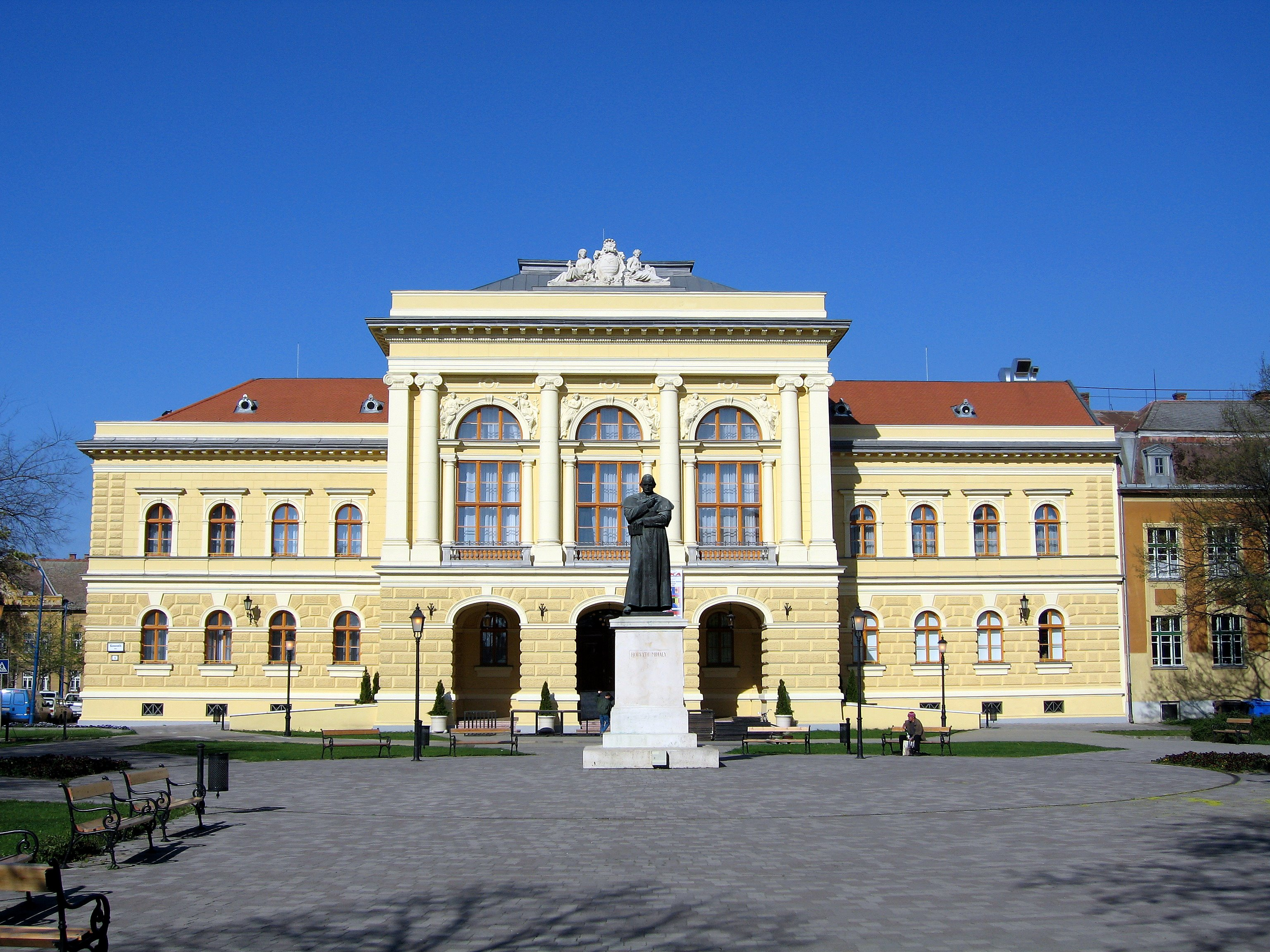
The Koszta József Múzeum in Szentes, 2007

Born on 27 March 1861, Koszta trained at various schools of art, including the Academy of Fine Arts in Munich, which he attended in 1891 on a scholarship, and the Master School of Gyula Benczúr. He studied under Károly Lotz and Bertalan Szekely. He became a member of the Szolnok Art Colony and worked largely in solitude on a farm he shared with landscape artist István Nagy for many years.

Koszta's artistic vision began to emerge in the 1920s. Working in the realism school, he focused heavily on images depicting peasant life, utilizing strong tonal colors and emphasizing the interplay of light and shadow. Particularly as his work progressed, he explored the pop of bright color against dark background. His prolific body of work includes portraits, genre paintings, still life and landscapes.

Prior to his death on 29 July 1949, he donated his images to the museum in Szentes, which renamed itself in his honor the Koszta József Múzeum.

Koszta is also commemorated in Szentes in the names of a street and an elementary school. In 1999, the city of Budapest held a memorial in his honor. In 2005, the city of Szentes placed a Wreath of Remembrance on Koszta's grave, but research later discovered that Kostza was interred elsewhere in an unmarked grave. His remains were reinterred in state in 2008.
