= Albert Rehm =

German classical philologist (1871–1949)

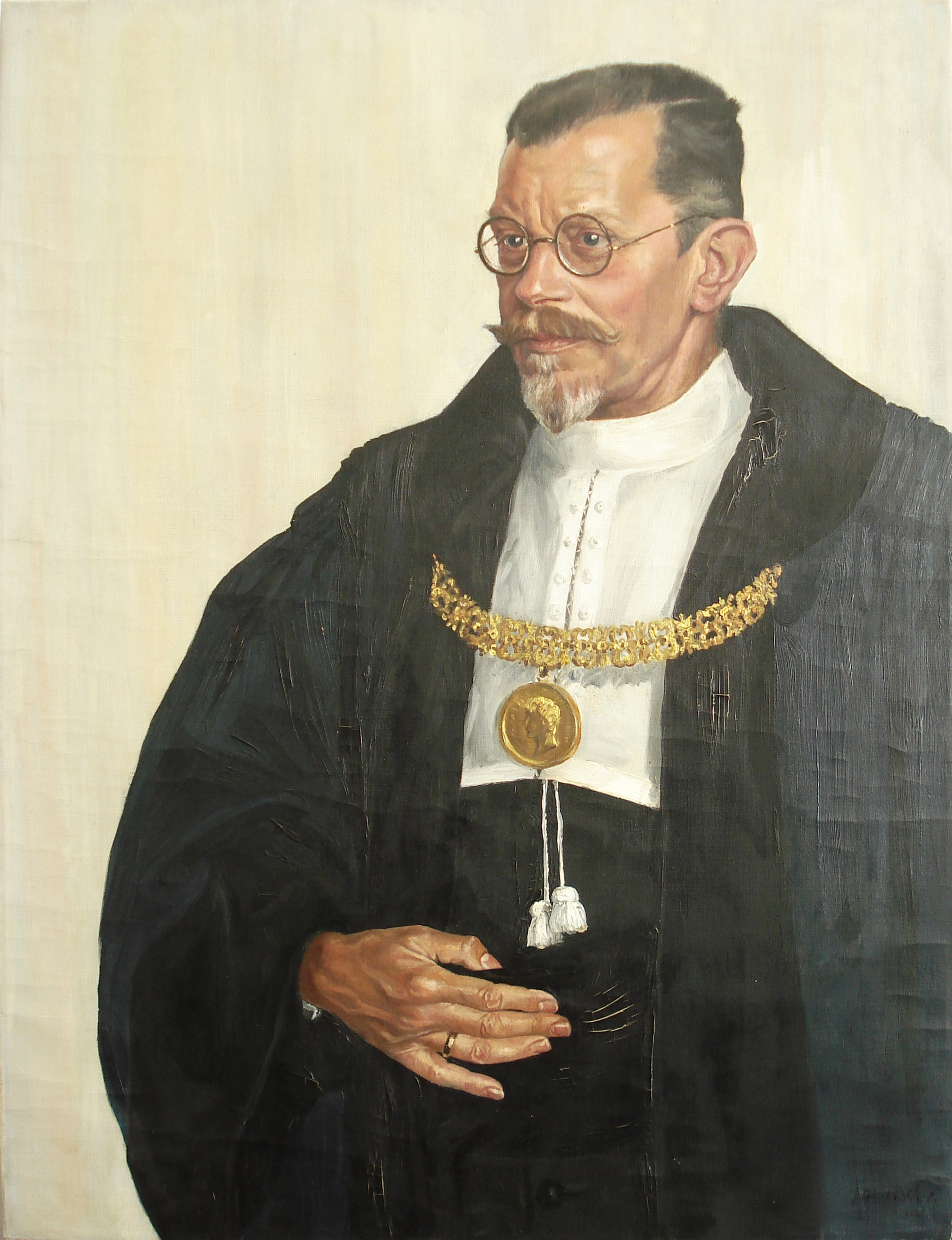
- Portrait by Ernst Maria Fischer
- Born: August 15, 1871; Augsburg
- Died: July 31, 1949 (aged 77); Munich
- Known for: Antikythera mechanism

Academic work
- Discipline: Languages
- Sub-discipline: Philologist

Albert Rehm (August 15, 1871 (in Augsburg)- July 31, 1949 (in Munich)) was a German philologist best known for his work on the Antikythera mechanism - he was the first to propose that it was an astronomical calculator.

== Services ==
Albert Rehm has made numerous contributions to both education and science. He has made important contributions to realism in particular: the volume Precise Sciences in the Introduction to Classical Philology by Alfred Gercke and Eduard Norden, as well as numerous essays and articles for the Realencyclopädie der classischen Altertumswissenschaft. He also wrote valuable works in epigraphy and archeology.

== Literature ==
He is mentioned in these books:

| Author | Name of Book | In | Seen in Pages |
|---|---|---|---|
| Franz Brunhölzl | Theodor Hopfner (1886-1945), Viktor Stegemann (1902-1948), Albert Rehm (1871-1949) | Eikasmós 4, 1993 | pp. 203–216 |
| Heinz Haffter | Albert Rehm † | Gnomon 22, 1950 | pp. 315–318 |
| Hildebrecht Hommel | Albert Rehm to the memory | Gymnasium 59, 1952 | pp. 193–195 |
