= Selâhattin Kantar =

Turkish archaeologist (1878–1949)

- Born: 1878
- Died: 17 November 1949 (aged 70–71)
- Occupations: archaeologist, museum director, journalist and playwright

Academic work
- Discipline: Museum Archaeology
- Institutions: İzmir Archaeology Museum

Ömer Selahattin Kantar (1878 in İzmir, Ottoman Empire – 17 November 1949 in İzmir, Turkey) was a Turkish archaeologist, museum director, journalist and playwright.

In 1927, he became the founding director of İzmir Archaeology Museum and he held this post until his death. Between 1932 and 1941, he was responsible for the first organized archaeological excavations at the site of the ancient city of Smyrna, a task he carried out jointly with the German archaeologist Rudolf Naumann. Opening up of a large part of Smyrna's Agora, location of İzmir Agora Open Air Museum today, is due to their work. Naumann and Kantar published the results of their findings for the first time in 1935, with a final version having appeared after Kantar's death in 1950.

== See also ==
- Charles Texier
- Ekrem Akurgal

== Bibliography ==
- Rudolf Naumann - Selahattin Kantar (1950). "Literatur zu Smyrna: 3. Die Agora von Smyrna. Bericht Äuber die in den Jahren 1932-1941 auf dem Friedhof Namazgah zu Izmir von der Museumsleitung in Verbindung mit der Tuerkischen Geschichtskommission durchgefuehrten Ausgrabungen" (PDF) (in German). Istanbuler Forschungen 17, p. 69 - 114, Berlin.
