= Roads (novel) =

Fantasy novel by Seabury Quinn

- Dust-jacket illustration by Virgil Finlay for Roads
- Author: Seabury Quinn
- Illustrator: Virgil Finlay
- Cover artist: Virgil Finlay
- Language: English
- Genre: Fantasy novel
- Publisher: Arkham House
- Publication date: 1948
- Publication place: United States
- Media type: Print (Hardback)
- Pages: 110 pp

Roads is a short novel by author Seabury Quinn. It was published by Arkham House in 1948 in an edition of 2,137 copies. It was Arkham House's first illustrated book and the author's first hardcover.

The story, in an unrevised edition, originally appeared in the January 1938 issue of Weird Tales magazine.

Roads is a Christmas story that traces the origins of Santa Claus from the beginning of the Christian era.

The story is split into three parts:

- "The Road to Bethlehem"
- "The Road to Calvary"
- "The Long, Long Road"

Roads was re-issued in 2005 by Red Jacket Press, as a fully authorized facsimile reproduction of the original Arkham House edition, and again by Shadowridge Press in 2017.

== Analysis ==
Roads has been described by fantasy historian Morgan Holmes as a historical fiction story that is also "borderline sword and sorcery".

== See also ==
- List of Christmas-themed literature
