= Jewish National Fund =

Non-profit organization founded in 1901 to encourage Jewish settlement

- Native name: קרן קיימת לישראל; Acronym: קק״ל
- Type: Public-benefit corporation
- Industry: Land development; Afforestation; Environmental conservation
- Founded: 1901; 125 years ago
- Headquarters: National Institutions House, Jerusalem
- Key people: Eyal Ostrinsky, chairperson, Russell Robinson, JNF-USA CEO
- Revenue: ₪ 2.583 billion (2015)
- Operating income: ₪ 511 million (2015)
- Net income: ₪ 398 million (2015)
- Total assets: ₪ 12.720 billion (2015)
- Number of employees: 950 (2015)
- Website: www.kkl.org.il jnf.org

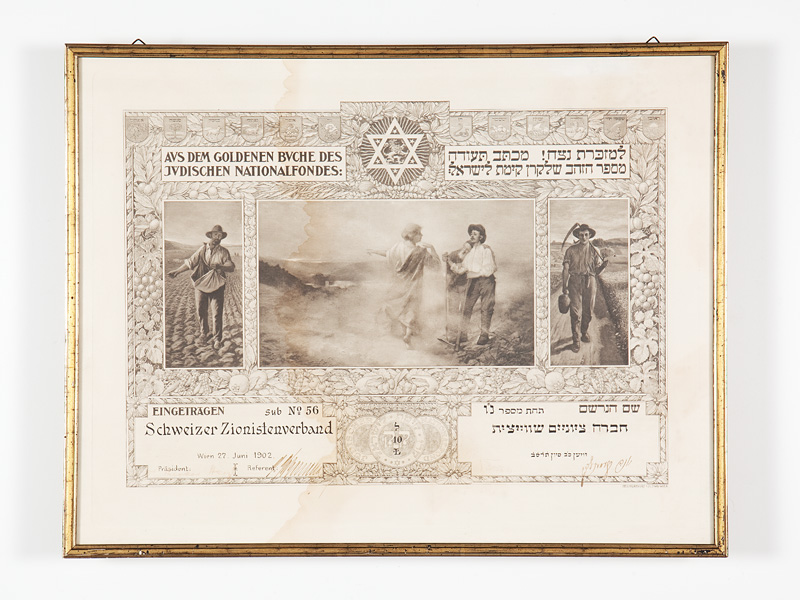
Golden Book signed by Theodor Herzl and Johann Kremenetzky. In the Jewish Museum of Switzerland's collection.

The Jewish National Fund (Hebrew: קֶרֶן קַיֶּימֶת לְיִשְׂרָאֵל, Keren Kayemet LeYisrael; commonly known by the acronym KKL-JNF or simply JNF) is a non-profit organization founded in 1901 to buy and develop land for Jewish settlement (aliyah) in Ottoman Syria (later Mandatory Palestine, subsequently Israel and the Palestinian territories).

By 2007, it owned 13% of the total land in Israel. Since its inception, the JNF has engaged extensively in afforestation, planting over 240 million trees in Israel. It has also built 180 dams and reservoirs, developed 250,000 acres (1,000 km^{2}) of land and established more than 1,000 parks.

The JNF has faced numerous criticisms for its role in the displacement of Palestinian Bedouins, the construction of Israeli military installations, the construction of Israeli settlements in the West Bank—considered illegal under international law, its refusal to lease to non-Jews, and its planting of non-indigenous trees potentially harmful or dangerous for Israel's ecosystem.

== Name ==
The JNF was founded at the Fifth Zionist Congress in 1901 as the Nationalfonds (National Fund). On April 8, 1907, it was incorporated in London as an "Association Limited by Guarantee" under the name "Juedischer Nationalfonds (Keren Kajemeth Le Jisroel), Limited". In October 1921, the company's name was changed to "Keren Kajemeth Le Jisroel Limited", and in January 1926 it was further changed to "Keren Kayemeth Leisrael Limited".

The name Keren Kayemet comes from the Mishnah. Tractate Peah (1:1) lists the types of good deeds whose rewards are enjoyed in this world, while the principal merit will be in the world to come: hakeren kayemet lo l'olam haba.

== History ==
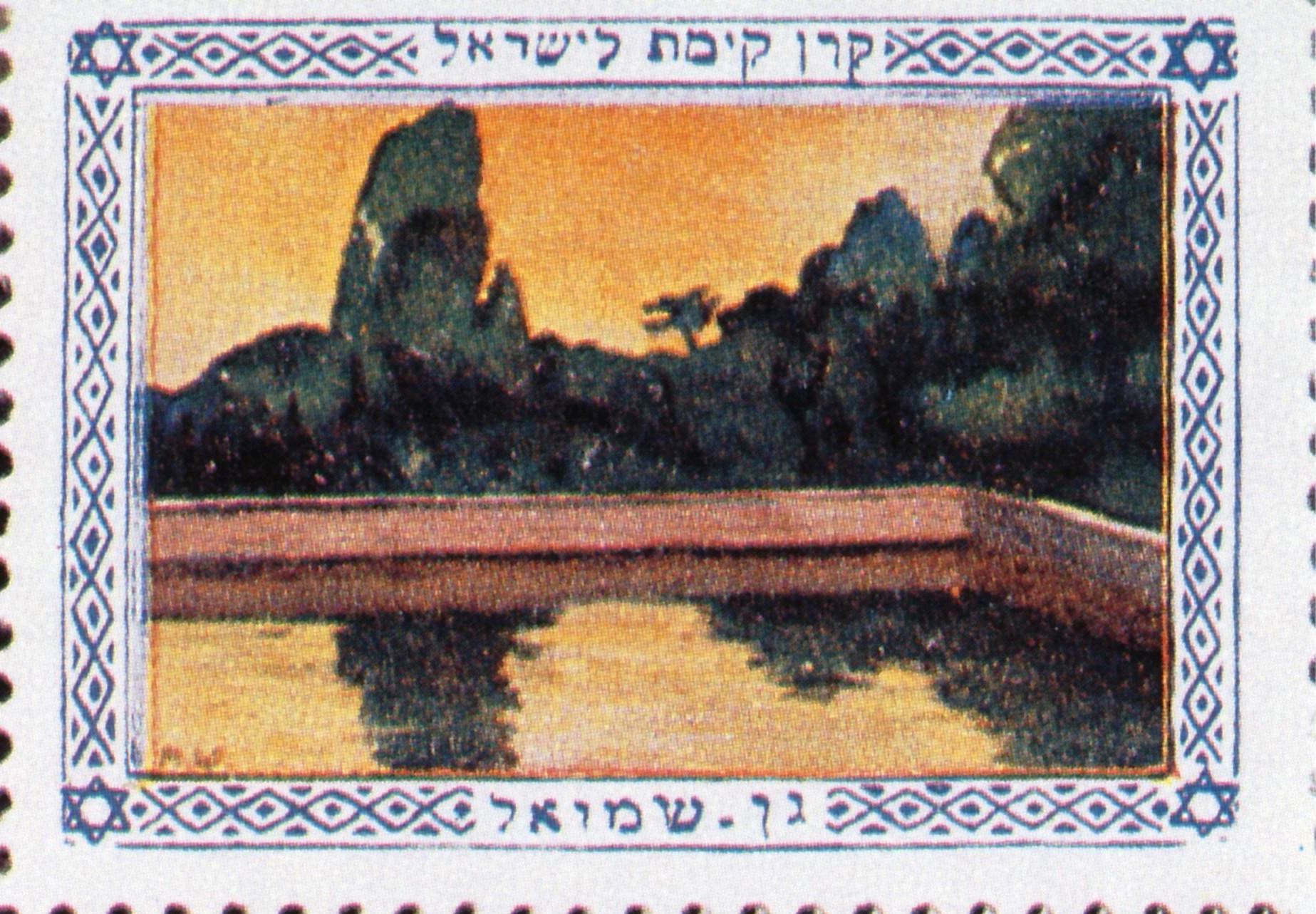
JNF postage stamp, c. 1915

The idea of a national land purchasing fund was first presented at the First Zionist Congress in 1897 by Hermann Schapira, a Lithuanian-Jewish professor of mathematics. The fund, named Keren Hakayemet (later known in English as the "Jewish National Fund") was formally established at the Fifth Zionist Congress in Basel in 1901. In its early years, the organization was headed by the Jewish industrialist Johann Kremenezky. Early land purchases were completed in Judea and the Lower Galilee. In 1909, the JNF played a central role in the founding of Tel Aviv. The establishment of the "Olive Tree Fund" marked the beginning of diaspora support of tree-planting efforts. The JNF collection box or "blue box" (known in Yiddish as a pushke) has been part of the JNF since its inception, symbolizing the partnership between Israel and the diaspora. In the period between the two world wars, about one million of these blue and white tin collection boxes could be found in Jewish homes throughout the world. From 1902 until the late 1940s, the JNF sold JNF stamps to raise money. For a brief period in May 1948, JNF stamps were used as postage stamps during the transition from Palestine to Israel.

=== Ottoman era ===
The first parcel of land, 200 dunams (0.20 km^{2}) east of Hadera, was received as a gift from the Russian Zionist leader Isaac Leib Goldberg of Vilnius, in 1903. It became an olive grove. In 1904 and 1905, the JNF purchased land plots near the Sea of Galilee and at Ben Shemen. In 1921, JNF land holdings reached 25,000 acres (100 km²), rising to 50,000 acres (200 km²) by 1927. At the end of 1935, JNF held 89,500 acres (362 km²) of land housing 108 Jewish communities.

=== British Mandate ===
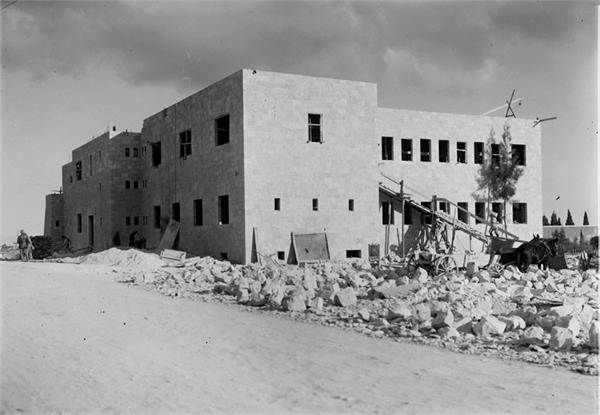
JNF head office in Jerusalem under construction 1938

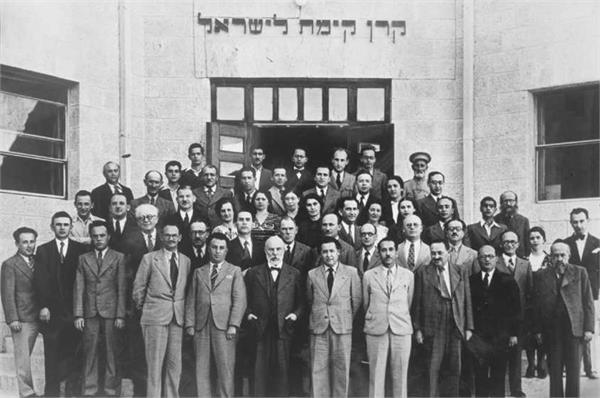
JNF staff Jerusalem 1940

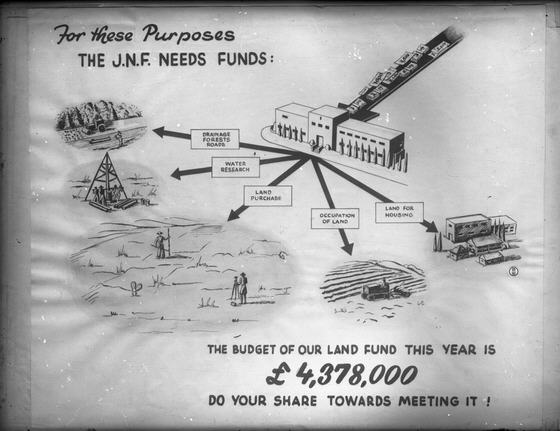
JNF publicity in 1945

In 1939, 10% of the Jewish population of the British Mandate of Palestine lived on JNF land. By 1948, the JNF owned 54% of the land held by Jews in the region, or a bit less than 4% of the land in what was then known as the British Mandate of Palestine. By the eve of statehood, the JNF had acquired a total of 936,000 dunams (936 km^{2}; 361 sq mi) of land; another 800,000 dunams (800 km^{2}; 310 sq mi) had been acquired by other Jewish organisations or individuals. Most of the JNF's activities during the Mandatory period were closely associated with Yossef Weitz, the head of its settlement department.

From the beginning, JNF's policy was to lease land long-term rather than sell it. In its charter, the JNF states: "Since the first land purchase in Eretz Israel in the early 1900s for and on behalf of the Jewish People, JNF has served as the Jewish People's trustee of the land, initiating and charting development work to enable Jewish settlement from the border in the north to the edge of the desert and Arava in the south."

=== State of Israel ===
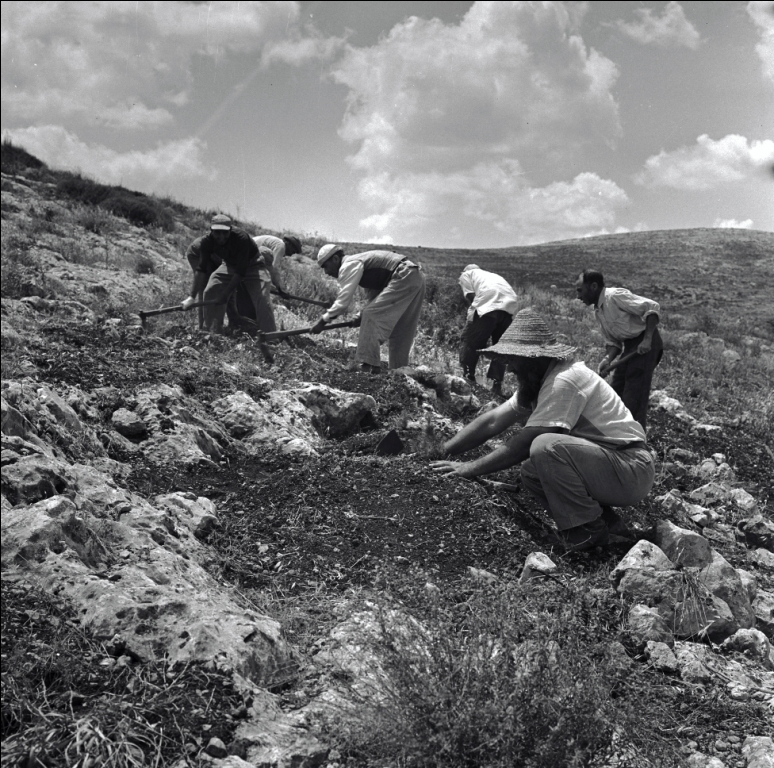
Planting trees in the Gilboa mountains, c.1960

After Israel's establishment in 1948, the government began to sell absentee lands to the JNF. On January 27, 1949, 1,000 km² of land (from a total of about 3,500 km²) was sold to the JNF for the price of IL11 million. Another 1,000 km² of land was sold to the JNF in October 1950. Over the years questions about the legitimacy of these transactions have been raised but Israeli legislation has generally supported the JNF's land claims.

In 1953, the JNF was dissolved and re-organized as an Israeli company under the name Keren Kayemet LeYisrael (JNF-KKL). In 1960, administration of the land held by the JNF-KKL, apart from forested areas, was transferred to a newly formed government agency, the Israel Land Administration (ILA). The ILA was then responsible for managing some 93% of the land of Israel. All the land managed by the ILA was defined as Israel lands; it included both land owned by the government (about 80%) and land owned by the JNF-KKL (about 13%). The JNF-KKL received the right to nominate 10 of the 22 directors of the ILA, lending it significant leverage within that state body.

After concentrating on the centre and northern part of the young state, the JNF-KKL started supporting Jewish settlements around the Negev border from around 1965. After the Six-Day War in 1967, the JNF-KKL started work in the newly occupied Palestinian territories as well.

In 2002, the Israeli government awarded the JNF the Israel Prize for lifetime achievement and special contribution to society and the State of Israel.

== Environmental and development projects ==
The JNF charter specifies the reclamation of land for the Jewish people as its primary purpose. During the 1980s, almost 60,000 acres (240 km^{2}) were planted. Over 50,000 acres (200 km^{2}) of crop-land were reclaimed, and hundreds of miles of roads built. Research into the soil and water conservation and the construction of dams and reservoirs took on added importance in the face of water shortages and drought.

The JNF's collaborative work involves participation in the International Arid Land Consortium, which explores the problems and solutions unique to arid and semiarid regions, working to develop sustainable ecological practices to improve the quality of life among people in the dry areas.

=== Afforestation ===
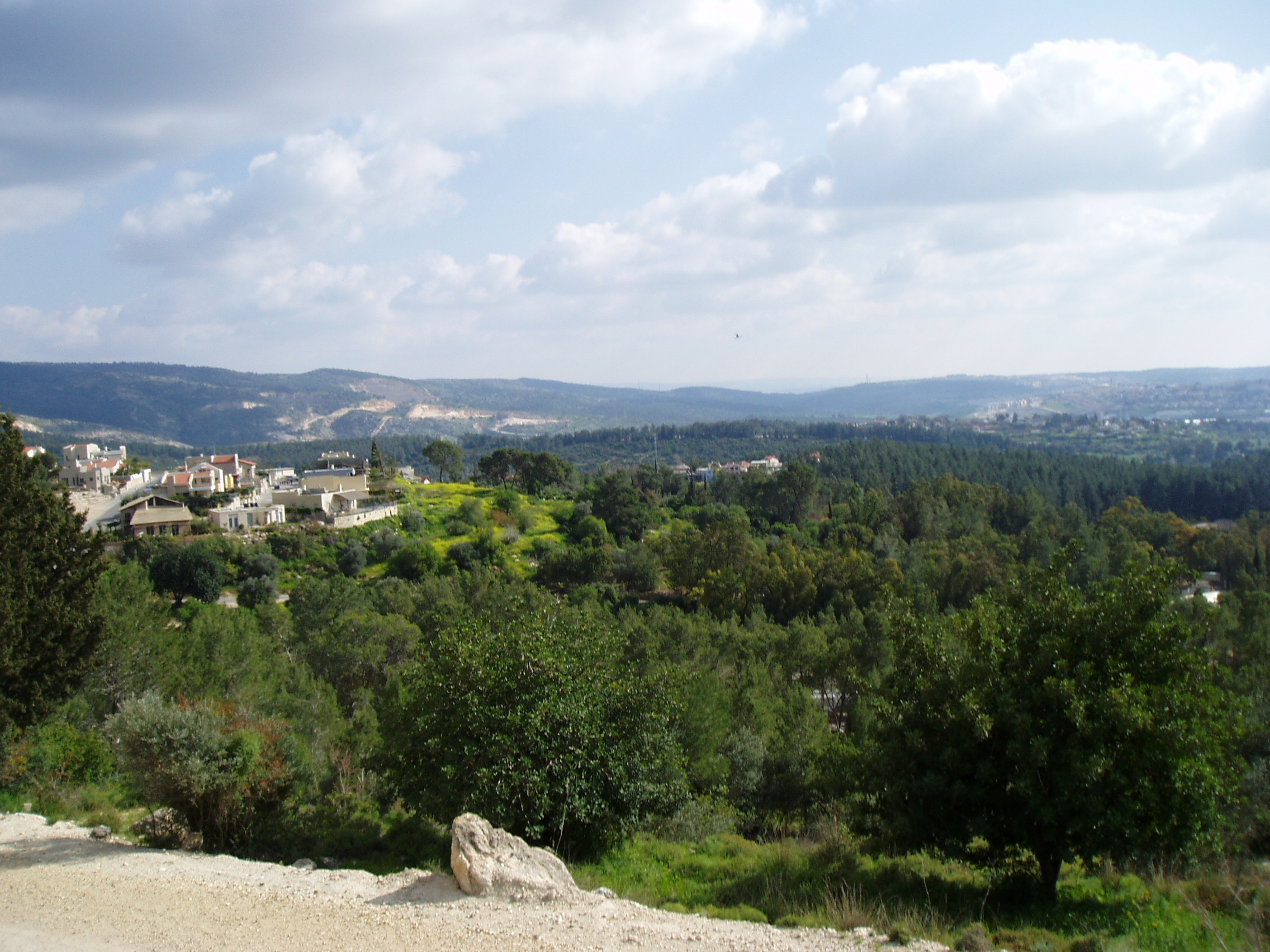
Eshtaol Forest planted by JNF

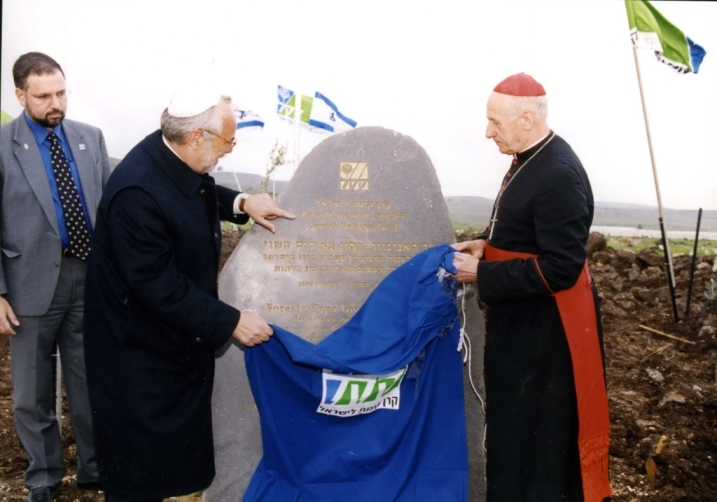
Dedication of Pope John Paul Forest in Nazareth

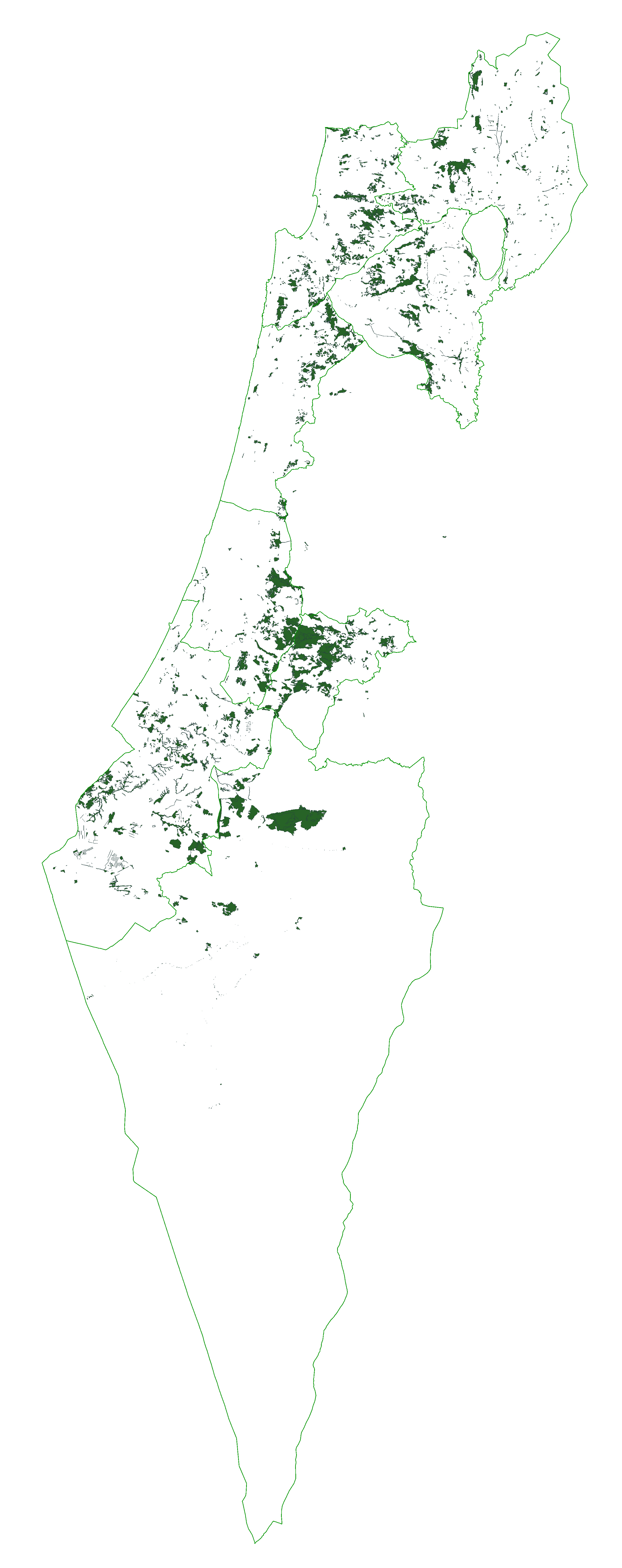
Map of planted forests in Israel by the Jewish National Fund. The afforestation project overseen by Yosef Weitz of the JNF was not only to decorate the landscape, but to cover up Palestinian villages that had been depopulated and destroyed to deter the return of Palestinian refugees.

The early JNF was active in tree-planting initiatives and reclamation of land. By 1935, JNF had planted 1.7 million trees over a total area of 1,750 acres (7.08 km²) and drained swamps, like those in the Hula Valley. Over fifty years, the JNF planted over 260 million trees largely in semi-arid, rocky, hilly terrain in which cultivation is not cost-effective and the risk of land degradation is high. While the Ministry of Agriculture is the official regulator of Israel's forests, the JNF is responsible for the implementation of forest management and afforestation.

After the Nakba, the nascent state of Israel's forest-planting project, overseen by Yosef Weitz of the JNF, was not only to decorate the landscape, but to cover up Palestinian villages that had been depopulated and destroyed to deter the return of Palestinian refugees. The JNF has promoted the slogan "Israel turned the desert green". Benny Morris writes that Weitz—"As the JNF executive in charge of land acquisition and its allocation to Jewish settlements, as the JNF representative on the Committee of Directorates of the National Institutions (ועד ההנהלות של המוסדות הלאומיים Va'ad ha-Hanhalot shel Hamosdot ha- Leumim) and on the Settlement Committee of the National Institutions, as chairman of the Negev Committee (the civilian government of the Jewish settlements in the southern desert region) and as a member of the three-man Arab Affairs Committee of the National Institutions"—was uniquely positioned to influence the policies to which Israel subjected Arabs and supervise their implementation at the local level.

In 2006, the JNF signed a 49-year lease agreement with the State of Israel which gives it control over 30,000 hectares (300 km^{2}) of Negev land for the development of forests. The JNF has been criticized for planting non-native pine trees which are unsuited to the climate, rather than local species such as olive trees. Others say that JNF deserves credit for this decision, and the forests would not have survived otherwise. According to JNF statistics, six out of every 10 saplings planted at a JNF site in Jerusalem do not survive, although the survival rate for planting sites outside Jerusalem is much higher – close to 95 percent. The Israeli newspaper Maariv wrote that workers remove saplings daily to allow more tourists to plant the following day, but the JNF denied this and said it would sue the paper for libel. The Union for Environmental Defense has criticized the fund's forestry practices for "overreliance on highly flammable pine trees" and overuse of toxic herbicides, in the context of minimal government and public scrutiny. Some forests have been planted for security reasons and as a means of demarcating Israeli space. Critics argue that many JNF lands outside the West Bank were illegally confiscated from Palestinian refugees, and that the JNF furthermore should not be involved with lands in the West Bank. Shaul Ephraim Cohen has said trees have been planted to restrict Bedouin herding. Susan Nathan wrote that forests were planted on the site of abandoned Arab villages after the 1948 war. Nathan also writes that olive trees were replaced by pine and cypress trees and that JNF planting policies erase traces of the Arab presence prior to 1948. In 2008, the JNF announced that historical information plaques erected in JNF parks and forests would cite the names of the Arab villages formerly located there.

Since 2009, the JNF has been helping the Palestinian Authority plan public parks and other civic amenities for the Palestinian city of Rawabi, north of Ramallah. The JNF provided the Palestinian Authority with 3,000 tree seedlings for a forested area being developed on the edge of the new city.

=== Water conservation ===
Israel's fresh water supply is dependent on 50 days a year of seasonal rainfall, while water consumption has doubled since 1960. Towards the end of the 1980s, the JNF undertook several large-scale water conservation projects. Dams and reservoirs were built to capture rainwater run-off which would have otherwise been lost in the Arava Valley, Reshafim in the Beit She'arim Valley and Kedma near Kiryat Gat. An artificial lake was built in Timna Park.

The JNF has built 200 reservoirs around the country, and plans to build 30 more reservoirs and water treatment plants over the next five years. Over the past decade, JNF has invested over $114.99 million in reservoir construction, increasing the country's total storage capacity by 7%, to over 130 million cubic metres (34×10^{9} US gal) of water. JNF is also involved in river rehabilitation projects all over Israel, such as the Nahal Alexander Restoration Project begun in 2003.

=== Land development ===
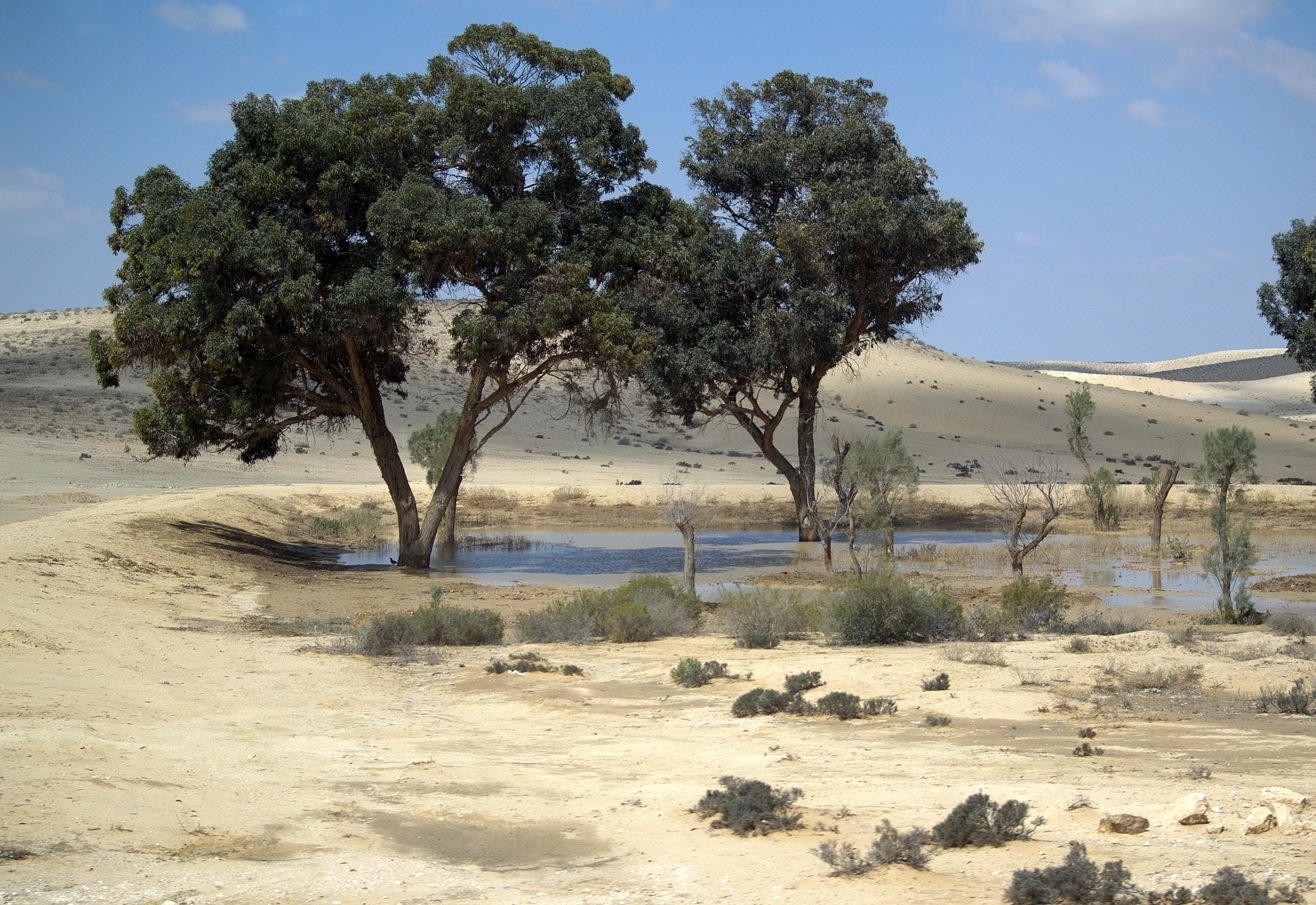
JNF trees in the Negev Desert. Man-made dunes (here a liman) help keep in rainwater, creating an oasis.

The JNF's engagement in developing Israel for Jewish purposes has involved a range of massive land infrastructure development projects. In the 1980s, the JNF launched a project known collectively as "Operation Promised Land", to meet the challenge of the massive upsurge of Jewish immigration from the Soviet Union and Ethiopia. In recent years, the JNF has again moved towards the development of towns to accommodate new Jewish immigrants, focusing on the Galilee and Negev regions, the two areas of Israel with a tenuous Jewish demographic majority. In particular, the JNF's 600 million dollar Blueprint Negev aims to attract and build infrastructure for 250,000 new settlers in the Negev desert, which accounts for 60% of the country's land mass but remains sparsely populated. The plan has come under scrutiny as groups such as Bustan, Save the Negev, and Ohalah have expressed concern over the project's lack of transparency in light of the potential strain on ecological resources and the possible impacts on Bedouin communities nearby.

== International fundraising ==
=== United States ===
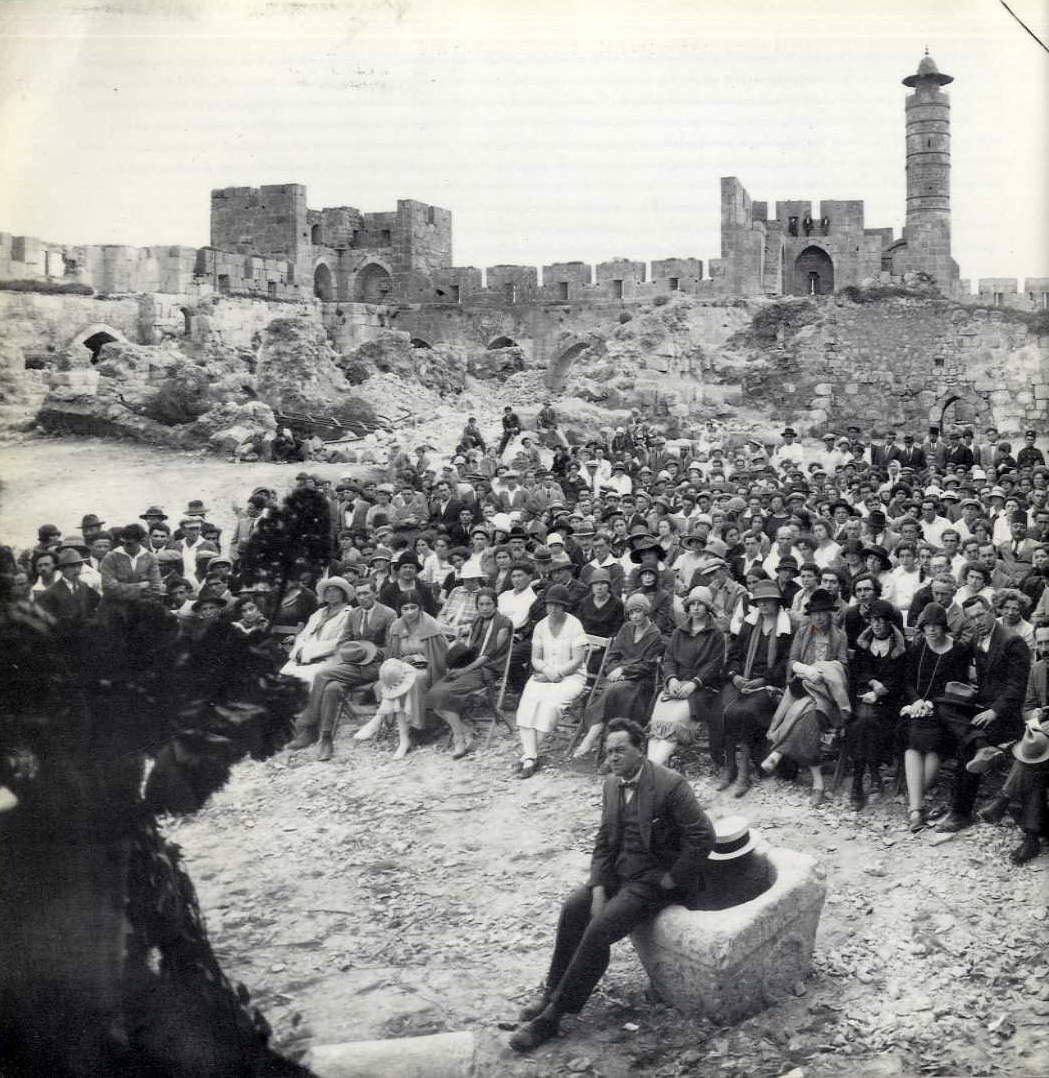
Benefit concert at David's Citadel, 1926

The United States branch of the JNF, incorporated on January 26, 1926, is the largest contributor to JNF-KKL. In 1996, JNF-USA was accused of mismanaging funds. According to the charges, only 21% of US donations reached Israel, and money was being diverted to Latin American JNF offices. In the wake of this scandal, the North American management was forced to resign. The tax-exempt status of the JNF-USA was challenged in 2011 as violating the public policy of the United States with respect to ethnic and religious discrimination. In July 2017, in response to an investigation by the Jewish Daily Forward, the New York State attorney general's office ordered JNF-USA to rescind two illegal loans totaling more than $500,000 the organisation had made to its chief executive officer, Russell Robinson, and its chief financial officer, Mitchel Rosenzweig. (New York State forbids charities from lending their officers any money.) JNF-USA argued that Robinson and Rosenzweig were not officers under the meaning of the law, but the attorney general's officer rejected that argument and the two executives agreed to repay the balance of their loans.

=== United Kingdom ===
In the United Kingdom, the JNF-UK (full name JNF Charitable Trust) was formed in 1939 and registered as a charitable organization. In October 2005, the JNF-KKL in Israel split from its British partner, accusing JNF-UK of having "misled" the public. The JNF-KKL claimed that the British group was using the KKL name to raise funds "for their own causes which are not associated with KKL." The Israeli JNF-KKL said it would launch a separate fundraising operation in the UK. JNF-UK launched a legal action to stop KKL using the names "JNF" or "Jewish National Fund" in the UK. The two organisations made peace after the Israeli-born businessman Samuel Hayek took over as JNF-UK chairman in 2008. Israeli JNF-KKL ended its dispute with the JNF-UK within weeks of ending a similar dispute with the American JNF-USA On 1 May 2020 a ruling was issued to JNF on a will writing service encouraging elderly to leave money to KKL. District Judge Geddes noted on KKL's "lack of independence from JNF UK"

The charitable status of the JNF-UK has come under increasing attack. British prime ministers Tony Blair and Gordon Brown had been honorary patrons of the JNF-UK, like all British prime ministers before them since its inception. David Cameron resigned as honorary patron to JNF-UK in 2011. According to a spokesman, Cameron said it was an organisation that was specifically focused around work in one specific country—i.e., Israel. Cameron's decision was interpreted as a snub, in spite of the spokesman's assurances that his decision had "absolutely nothing to do with any anti-Israel campaign". However, campaigners claimed that Cameron's resignation was due to political pressure. Since then, the JNF-UK's honorary patrons include no leader of the main British political parties. An Early Day Motion in the British parliament called for the revocation of the JNF's charitable status in the UK and was signed by 66 Members of Parliament. In 2012 the Green Party called for the JNF to be stripped of its charity status.

In December 2021, JNF-UK Chairman Samuel Hayek was embroiled in controversy, following remarks that implied that Muslim immigration was endangering the future of British Jews.

=== Canada ===
Following the Six-Day War, the Canadian branch of the JNF raised about $15 million US to fund a 1,700-acre park called "Canada Park". The park was built in 1970 on the land of three Palestinian villages which were destroyed on the orders of Yitzhak Rabin. Starting around 2013, Independent Jewish Voices has campaigned against JNF Canada's charitable status, and in 2017 it filed a formal complaint with the Canadian government seeking the revocation of JNF's charitable status on the basis of discrimination.

In 2018, JNF Canada informed its members that it was under audit by the Canada Revenue Agency (CRA). The following year, CBC News reported how JNF had used charitable donations to fund Israeli military infrastructure. While Canadians can directly support foreign militaries in their personal capacity, the CRA rules ban tax receipts or tax deductions for such donations by charities. JNF told CBC that it had stopped funding military projects in 2016.

In August 2024, the Canadian government announced the removal of JNF Canada's charitable status. The CRA revealed 358 pages of documents explaining its decision, which outlined "repeated and serious non-compliance" with the laws governing charities. Reasons included doubts that JNF Canada carries out its stated charitable purpose, an insufficient paper trail documenting where money was going, missing records that the CRA did not have, some documents provided only in Hebrew, and housing documents in a foreign country (Israel). In response, JNF Canada has accused the CRA of "targeted bias", while CEO Lance Davis said JNF Canada repeatedly asked for a conversation with the CRA to explain the discrepancies, but was repeatedly denied.

== JNF collection boxes ==
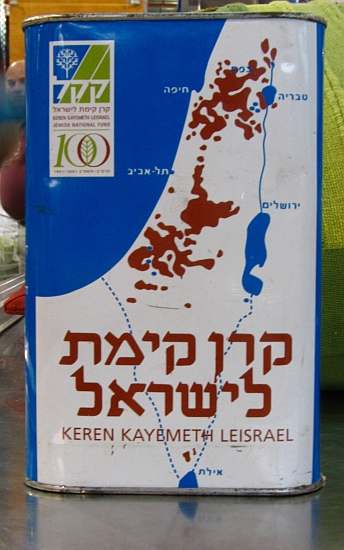
JNF collection box

JNF's blue charity boxes were distributed by the JNF almost from its inception at the initiative of Johann Kremenezky. Once found in many Jewish homes, the boxes became one of the most familiar symbols of Zionism. Yehoshua Frizman, headmaster of the Realgymnasium for Girls in Kovno, Lithuania, wrote a children's song about the boxes:

The box is hanging on the wall
The blue box
Each penny put inside
Redeems the land.

A bank clerk named Haim Kleinman in Nadvorna, Galicia, placed a blue box labelled "Keren Le'umit" in his office and urged others to do the same. The first mass-produced boxes were distributed in 1904. Kleinman visited Mandate Palestine in the 1930s and planned to make aliyah, but perished in the Holocaust. Menahem Ussishkin wrote that "The coin the child contributes or collects for the redemption of the land is not important in itself; it is not the child that gives to the Keren Kayemeth, but rather the Fund that gives to the child, a foothold and lofty ideal for all the days of his life."

The boxes could take a variety of shapes and sizes. Some were paper-made to fold flat like envelopes and able to contain only a small number of coins, some early American boxes were cylindrical, some German boxes were made of tin stamped into the shape of bound books.

Israel issued postage stamps bearing the image of the blue box in 1983, 1991, and 1993 for the JNF's 90th anniversary.

== Controversies ==
=== Transparency ===
T'ruah has expressed concerns that the JNF is not transparent about where their funds go and that the organisation may be subsidizing projects in West Bank settlements. The organisation chief executive later acknowledged that JNF does fund projects within settlements. A review of their tax filing from 2014 led Rabbi Jill Jacobs of T'ruah to estimate that about $600,000 of the $27.2 million in grants by JNF-USA went to support settlements. In 2021, JNF announced that it would change its policy and subsidize Israeli settlements in the West Bank. However, the necessary vote of the board was delayed indefinitely in April after opposition from members and supporters abroad.

Israeli lawmakers have sought, unsuccessfully, to allow the State Comptroller to examine the books of the organisation to determine whether the group's funds were being spent appropriately.

=== Land leasing policy ===
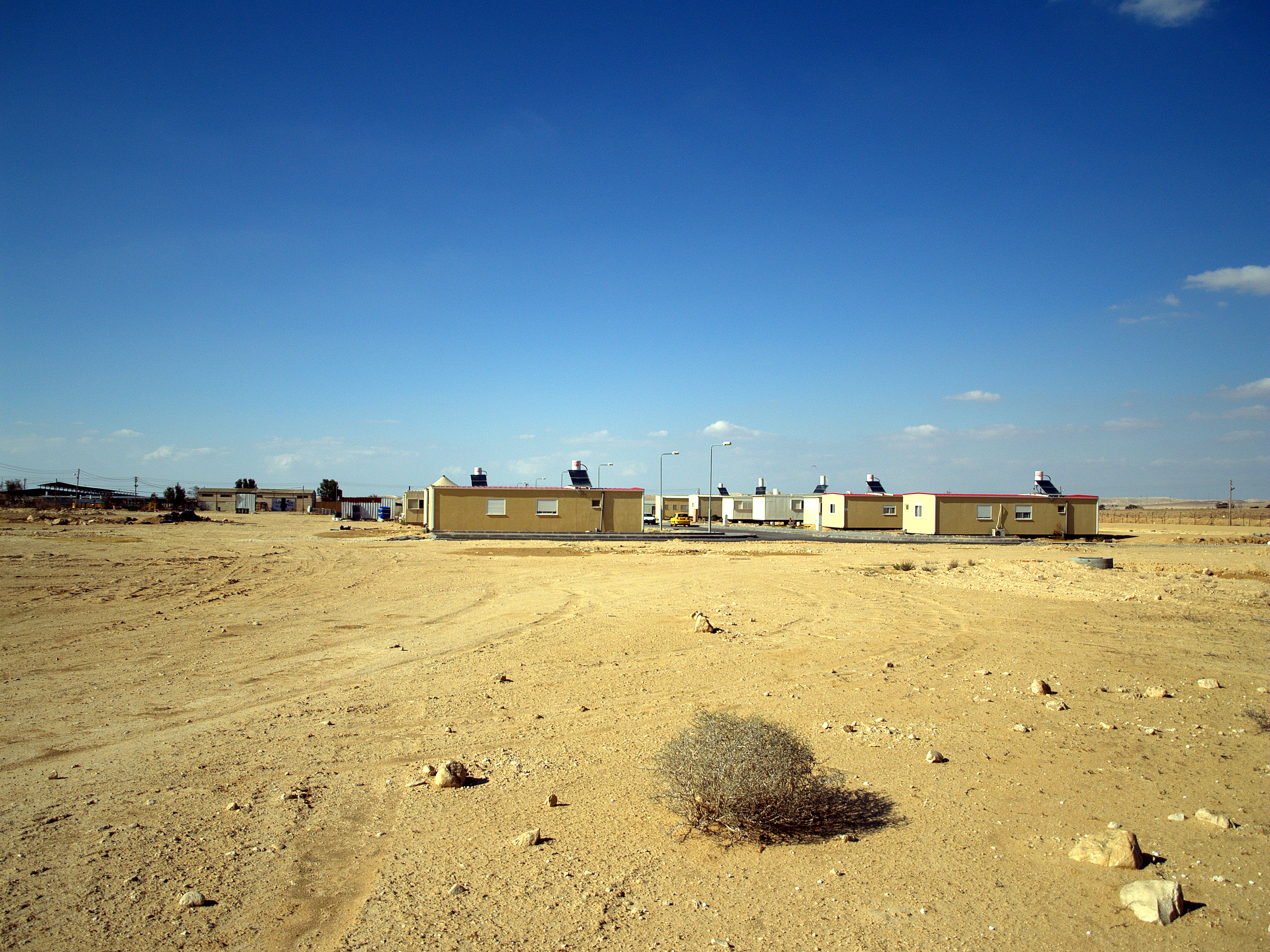
A community in the Negev established by the JNF under its Blueprint Negev program

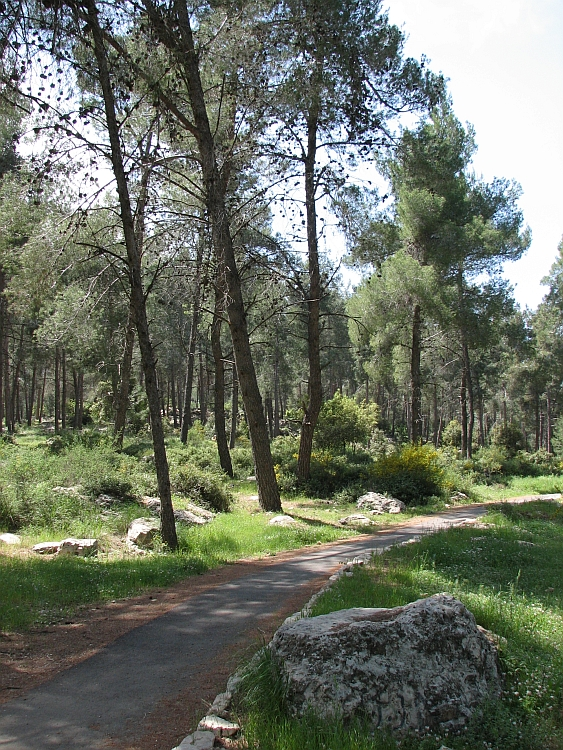
Aminadav Forest

The JNF stipulates that only Jews can buy, mortgage or lease JNF land. Article 23 of the JNF lease states that the lessee must pay compensation to the JNF if this stipulation is violated. On 13 October 2004, Adalah, an organisation and legal center for Arab minority rights in Israel, submitted a petition to the Supreme Court entitled Challenging the Prohibition on Arab Citizens of Israel from Living on Jewish National Fund Land. Shortly afterwards, the Association for Civil Rights in Israel and the Arab Center for Alternative Planning also filed a petition to the Supreme Court challenging the ILA policy as discriminatory. The JNF responded to the two petitions on 9 December. In its response, the JNF stated:

The JNF is not the trustee of the general public in Israel. Its loyalty is given to the Jewish people in the Diaspora and in the state of Israel... The JNF, in relation to being an owner of land, is not a public body that works for the benefit of all citizens of the state. The loyalty of the JNF is given to the Jewish people and only to them is the JNF obligated. The JNF, as the owner of the JNF land, does not have a duty to practice equality towards all citizens of the state.

On 26 January 2005, Israel's Attorney General Menachem Mazuz ruled that lease restrictions violated Israeli anti-discrimination laws, and that the ILA could not discriminate against Arab citizens of Israel in the marketing and allocation of the lands it managed; this applied both to government lands and to lands belonging to the JNF. However, the Attorney General also decided that, whenever a non-Jewish citizen wins an ILA tender for a plot of JNF-owned land, the ILA would compensate the JNF with an equal amount of land. This would allow the JNF to maintain its current hold over 2,500,000 dunams (2,500 km^{2}) of land, or 13% of the total land in Israel.

As a result of the Mazuz ruling, authorities found themselves facing a conundrum: on the one hand the JNF, as a "private" organisation, had received donations from outside Israel which were specifically earmarked for the benefit of Jews; on the other hand, the state and the ILA (an agency of the state), which administered the land owned by the JNF, were banned from discriminating against non-Jews. In early 2005, the JNF and the Finance Ministry were reported as trying to draft a new agreement that would separate the JNF from the state, thereby allowing it to continue selling land to Jews only.

In July 2007, the Israeli Knesset approved the Jewish National Fund Bill, submitted by MK Uri Ariel (National Union/National Religious Party), in its preliminary reading; but the bill was later dropped. The bill sought to authorize the JNF practice of refusing to lease land to Arab citizens. The bill called for a new provision to the 1960 Israel Land Administration Law, entitled "Management of the Jewish National Fund's Lands"; the provision stated that regardless of other conflicting rulings, leasing JNF lands for Jewish settlement did not constitute discrimination, and: "For the purpose of every law, the association documents of the Jewish National Fund will be interpreted according to the judgment of the Jewish National Fund's founders and from a nationalist-Zionist standpoint."

In September 2007, the High Court heard a further Adalah petition seeking cancellation of an ILA policy as well as Article 27 of the Regulations of the Obligations of Tenders, which in concert prevent Arab citizens from participating in bids for JNF-controlled land. The High Court of Justice agreed to delay a ruling by at least four months, and a temporary settlement was reached (following the compromise proposed in 2005 by Menachem Mazuz) wherein, although the JNF would be prevented from discriminating on grounds of ethnicity, nevertheless every time land is sold to a non-Jew, the ILA would compensate it with an equivalent amount of land, thus ensuring the total amount of land owned by Jewish Israelis remains the same.

An alternative proposal submitted by Amnon Rubinstein, a former minister, recommended that a distinction be made between JNF lands and state lands, such that all JNF lands directly acquired via donations from abroad specifically for the benefit of Jews (some 900,000 dunams (900 km^{2})) will pass to the direct control of the JNF; while properties purchased by the JNF from the state in the 1950s and formerly belonging to Palestinian refugees (the so-called "lands of missing persons" or "absentee" lands, amounting to 2,000,000 dunams (2,000 km^{2})) would revert to state control. Rubinstein's intention was "to avoid passing racist legislation [such as the Ariel Bill] that would limit the use of these lands to the Jews". Others denied however that the Ariel Bill was racist. The Rubinstein proposal was not taken up.

In late 2007, a land swap deal was proposed that would allow the JNF to continue leasing its lands only to Jews. Urban JNF land sold in future to non-Jews would include an automatic swap mechanism: the fund would transfer the land to the ILA, and in exchange would receive the purchase price plus a similar-sized plot in the Negev.

=== Eviction dispute ===
In December 2011, Seth Morrison resigned from the board of JNF-USA in protest at the decision by Himnuta, a subsidiary of JNF-KKL, to launch eviction proceedings against the Sumarin family, who lived in the Silwan neighborhood of East Jerusalem. In the case of the Sumarin family, the children of the original owner, Musa Sumarin, were declared absentees after his death even though there were other family members living in the home at the time. In 1991, the Israeli government took the step of transferring the property to the JNF subsidiary. A campaign against the JNF's eviction was launched by Rabbis for Human Rights, the Sheikh Jarrah Solidarity Movement, and the Jewish organisation Yachad. The pressures led the JNF to delay the eviction. The JNF played a similar role in evicting the Gozlan family in the 1990s.

=== Military and settlement funding ===
In addition to its reclamation and other charitable projects, the JNF also funded infrastructure projects on Israel Defense Forces sites. Documents by the JNF indicated that funds from the Canadian branch were used to fund projects including Camp Ariel Sharon in the Negev, an auditorium and training facilities at an Israeli Navy base in Bat Galim, and mess halls for the 124 Squadron and 131 Squadron of the Israeli Air Force at the Palmachim and Nevatim Airbases. A 2014 document by the JNF notes that funds from its Canadian branch were used for a dozen "KKL for IDF" projects in the previous decade. A JNF Canada document from the same year pitched donors on an IDF family meeting centre for members in active service as well as a road at the Israeli-Egyptian border to "improve access to the area for security forces" to be developed in coordination with the IDF.

A document by JNF's Canadian branch stated that it had helped develop an outdoor fitness area at a military base in Sde Boker for the Gadna program, which prepares young Israelis for IDF service. Regular army personnel could also use the area. Similarly, in 2014, the JNF Canada's Edmonton branch stated that it was funding a family visitation area, a plaza by the barracks, and an intake and release facility at Tze'elim Army Base.

In 2016, the JNF also funded a soccer field at Hatzerim Airbase.

JNF's Canadian branch also helped construct a hilltop settler outpost, Givat Oz VeGaon, which was deemed illegal by the Israeli government and received at least 18 demolition orders from the Ministry of Defense.

== See also ==
- Central Zionist Archives in Jerusalem. Collections of the Jewish National Fund (KKL1-KKL17)
- Israel Land Administration
- Israel Land Authority
- Jewish National Fund Tree of Life Award
- List of forests in Israel
- List of Israel Prize recipients
- Palestine Jewish Colonization Association
