= Keren HaKirya building complex =

Keren HaKirya
- קרן הקריה

General information
- Status: Development
- Type: Office, residential
- Location: Tel Aviv, Israel
- Construction started: projected for 2021
- Completed: projected for late 2024
- Cost: $850 million

Height
- Roof: 350 meters, 280 meters, 230 meters, 230 meters

Technical details
- Floor count: Triangular: 80; Square: 50, Octagonal: 45
- Floor area: Public: 5,000 m^{2} (54,000 sq ft); Residential: 60,000 m^{2} (650,000 sq ft); Office: 170,000 m^{2} (1,800,000 sq ft)

Design and construction
- Architect: AI Architecture and Urban Design

The Keren HaKirya building complex is a proposed set of buildings in Tel Aviv, Israel. It will comprise 80-story and 50-story office towers and two 45-story residential towers that will stand above a two-story retail mall. It will be situated at the intersection of Begin Road and Sha'ul HaMelekh Street in the city's Midtown business district on an area of 38 dunams (9.5 acres).

The project was initiated by the Israel Land Authority, together with Israel's Defense Ministry and the Tel Aviv Municipality, with the master planning and design developed by A.I. Architecture and Urban Design (Isaac Halfon and Alan Aranoff architects), with project coordination by Ehud Tayar Management and Engineering Ltd.

The design of the office towers, whose 350-meter height is unprecedented in Israel, consists of clusters of extruded triangles of different heights that create a singular prismatic effect on the skyline. A central focus of the project is the landscaped pedestrian plaza that will be flanked by retail and dining arcades, with a pedestrian bridge that links the two commercial buildings.

The project will be served by Tel Aviv's light rail system green line, with bus, bicycle and pedestrian access, as well as multiple underground parking and service levels.

When completed, the project will add some 770 housing units to Tel Aviv's increasingly limited housing stock.

== See also ==
- HaKirya
