= Israel Land Administration =

Defunct Israeli agency managing land

The Israel Land Administration (ILA; Hebrew: מנהל מקרקעי ישראל, romanized: Minhal Mekarka'ei Yisra'el; Arabic: مديرية أراضي اسرائيل) was an Israeli government authority responsible for managing land in Israel which is in the public domain. It manages 93% of the land in the country. As a result of reforms enacted by the 2009 government, it was transformed into Israel Land Authority.

== Creation ==
Israel Land Administration was created in 1960 as a result of the Knesset legislature to oversee the distribution and protection of all lands in Israel. According to the Basic law: Israel lands (חוק יסוד: מקרקעי ישראל), ILA manages the land in Israel that is either property of the state, the Jewish National Fund (JNF) or the Development Authority. Today it is responsible for some 4,820,500 acres (19,508,000 dunams) that constitute 93% of Israel's lands, which are mostly leasable to Israeli citizens or Jewish non-residents. The remaining 7% of land is either privately owned or under the protection of religious authorities.

=== Depopulated Palestinian areas ===
In 1965, the Israel Land Administration was responsible for the demolition of more than 100 of the Palestinian towns and villages which had been depopulated in 1948.

== Functions ==
- Guarantee that the national land is used in accordance with Israeli laws,
- Actively protect and supervise state lands,
- Make state land available for public use,
- Plan, develop and manage state land reserves,
- Initiate planning and development (including relocation of existing occupants),
- Regulate and manage registration of state lands,
- Authorize contracts and agreements with other parties,
- Provide services to the general public.

== Policy objectives ==
- Designating land areas for public and state requirements
- Assuring land reserves for future needs
- Preservation of agricultural lands
- Land usage in accordance with the law
- Safeguarding the state lands

== Legal framework ==
Four Israeli laws form the legal basis of its land policy:

- Basic Law: Israel lands (1960) states that all the lands owned by the state of Israel will remain in state ownership, and will not be sold or given to anyone.
- Israel Lands Law (1960) details several exceptions to the basic law.
- Israel Land Administration Law (1960) describes the details of establishing and operating the Israel Land Administration.
- Covenant between the State of Israel and the World Zionist Organization (establishing the Jewish National Fund) (1960)

== Structure ==
The Israel Land Council sets policy for the ILA. It is chaired by Israel's Vice Prime Minister, the Minister of Industry, Trade, Labor and Communications. The council has 22 members; 12 represent government ministries and 10 represent the Jewish National Fund. The Director General of the ILA is appointed by the government.

=== Departments ===
- Planning and Development
- Mapping
- Finance Transactions
- Land Assessment
- Inspection and Supervision
- Legal Counsel, Ownership and Registration
- Personnel and Administration
- Information Technology
- Urban Marketing
- Internal Audit

== Land ownership issues ==
"Ownership" of real estate in Israel usually means leasing rights from the ILA for a period of 49 or 98 years. The Israel Lands Administration distinguishes between urban land and agricultural land: Urban land is leased for periods of 49 years with an option to extend the lease for another period of 49 years. In practice though the rights granted to leaseholders under the current Israeli leasehold system closely resemble full property rights.

Under Israeli law, the Israel Land Administration cannot lease land to foreign nationals. In practice foreigners may be allowed to lease if they show that they are eligible to immigrate to Israel in accordance with the Law of Return. In 2000, the High Court ruled that the State may not allocate land to its citizens on the basis of religion or nationality, even if it allocates the land through a third party such as the Jewish Agency. The Court's decision includes restrictions on the leasing or sale of land based on nationality, religion, or any other discriminatory category.

== Reforms ==
As a part of reforms enacted in 2009, the Israel Land Administration was dismantled and replaced by the Israel Land Authority. A long-time land tenancy was turned into private land ownership.

According to the official press-release, "The reforms are designed to reduce bureaucratic impediments for homeowners who wish to enlarge their homes and the involvement of the Government in the real estate market, and enable the ILA to focus on developing and marketing state lands, as opposed to dealing with leased residential units." The reforms are meant to offer a greater supply of residential units that would cause housing prices to decline.

Upon the agreement reached after negotiations were held between ILA management, Ministry of Finance and Trade unions, some 200 of ILA staff will leave their job voluntarily, as for the rest they will be embedded in the structure of a new Israel Land Authority organization.

=== Kahlon's appointment ===
On January 21, 2013, prime minister Benjamin Netanyahu appointed former Communications and Welfare Minister Moshe Kahlon as a new ILA chairman. Kahlon was chosen since he enjoyed public support since he reduced cellphone bills by reforming the communications market. It was expected that his appointment would contribute to lowering the cost of housing for Israelis.

Netanyahu's decision was highly criticized by other politicians since it was taken only two days before the elections. The head of the Central Election Committee, Supreme Court Justice Elyakim Rubinstein, barred Israeli media to broadcast the press conference at which the appointment was announced, ruling that it could be regarded as election propaganda, which is banned. The Israeli Labor Party leader Shelly Yachimovich said that Kahlon's appointment was illegal since according to law, the ILA chairman is appointed not by PM but rather by the Housing and Construction Minister. She filed a petition to the High Court of Justice.

== See also ==
- Israeli land and property laws
- Jewish National Fund
- Israel Land Authority
