= Johann Kremenezky =

Johann (Yona) Kremenezky
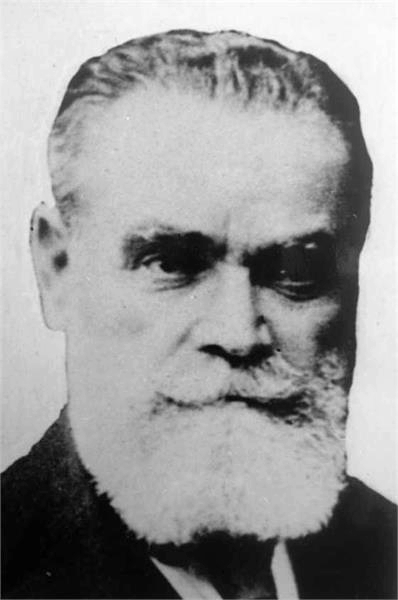
- Born: Jonas Yosipovich Levinson; 1850; Odessa, Ukraine
- Died: 25 October 1934 (aged 83–84)
- Burial place: Vienna, Austria
- Occupations: Electrical engineer, businessman
- Awards: Wilhelm Exner Medal 1930

Johann Kremenezky, also spelled Kremenetski or Kremenetzky (Hebrew: יונה קרמנצקי) was born February 15, 1850, and died on October 25, 1934. He was a Zionist industrialist, electrical engineer, founder of the Jewish National Fund, and personal secretary and adviser to Theodor Herzl.

== Biography ==
Jonas Yosipovich Levinson (later Yona Kremenezky) was born in Odessa. He was the owner of Kremenezky, Mayer & Co, a noted electric lighting company in Vienna. In the summer of 1896, Kremenezky met with Theodor Herzl, leader of the Zionist movement, to discuss the implementation of modern technology in the future Jewish state.

== Zionist activism ==
Kremenezky was the first chairman of the Jewish National Fund (JNF) from 1902 to 1907. JNF's blue collection boxes were distributed by the JNF almost from its inception at the initiative of Kremenezky. Once found in many Jewish homes, the boxes became one of the most familiar symbols of Zionism. Additionally he sold stamps to raise funds.

== Awards and recognition ==
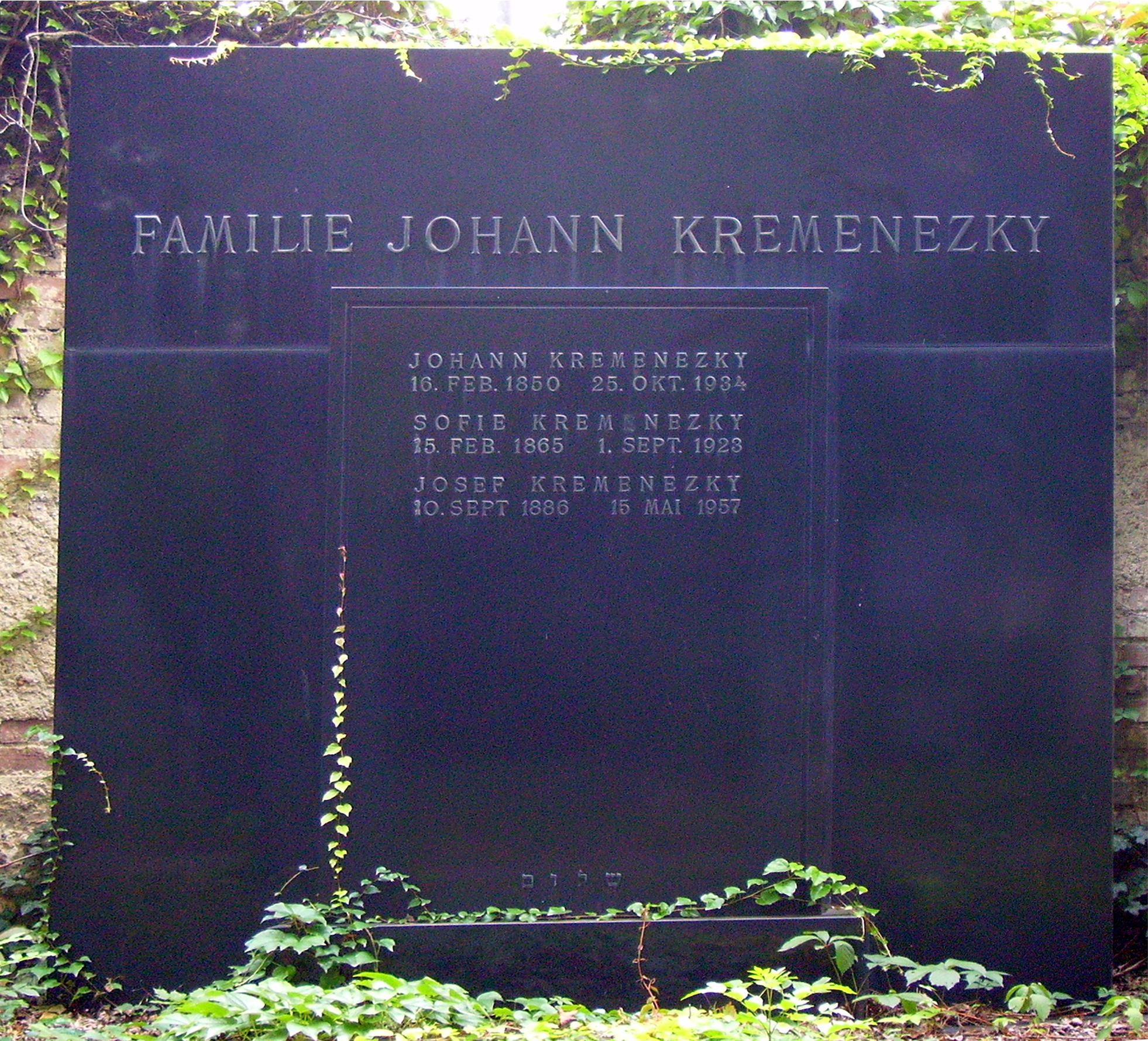
Grave of Kremenezky

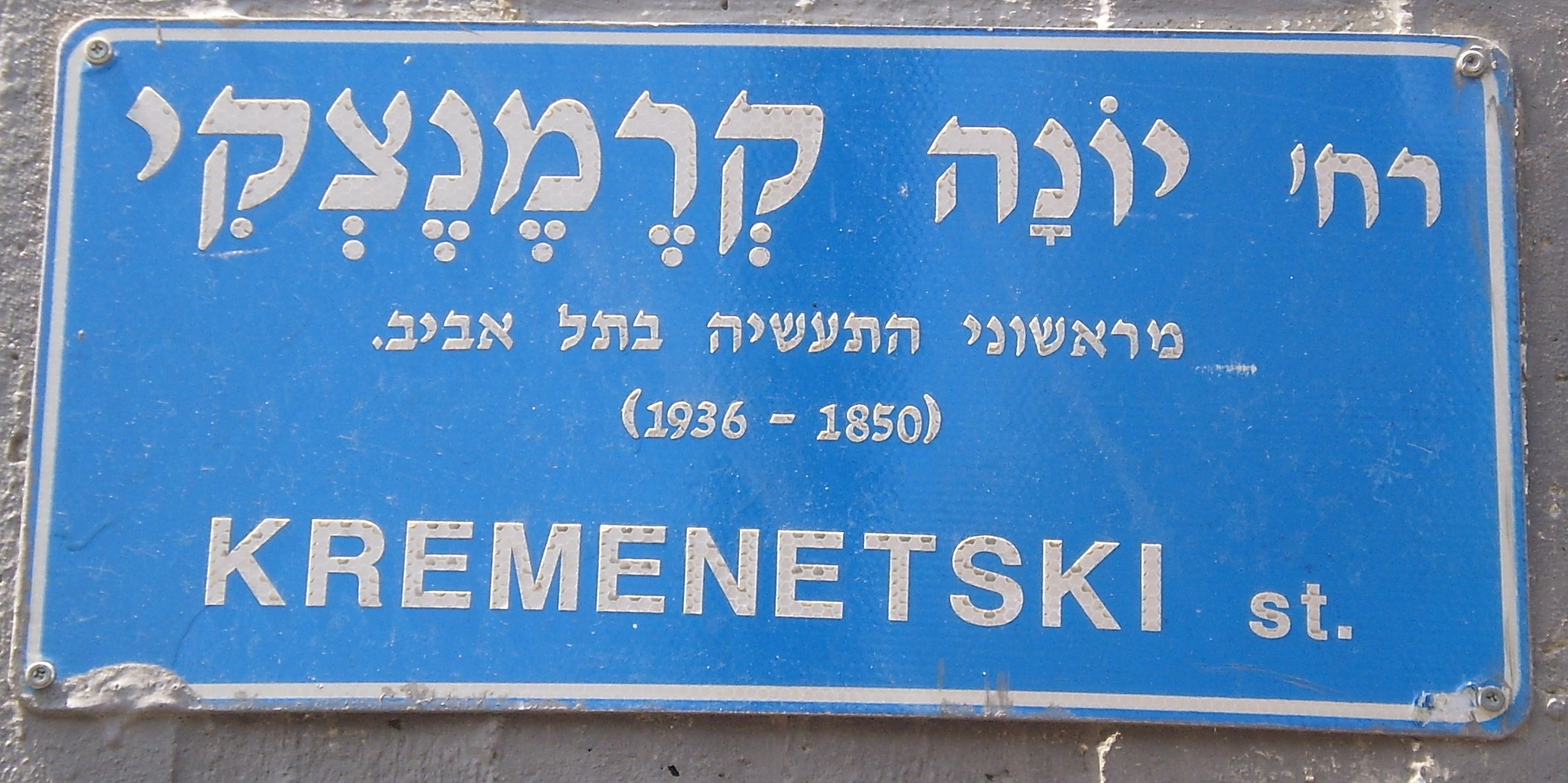
Kremenetzki Street, Tel Aviv

In 1930, he was awarded the Wilhelm Exner Medal On 20 June 1956 a street was named after him in Vienna, called Kremenetzkygasse.

Streets in Tel Aviv and Jerusalem are named for him.
