= Israeli land and property laws =

Legal framework dealing with ownership and rights over land and property in Israel

Land and property laws in Israel are the property law component of Israeli law, providing the legal framework for the ownership and other in rem rights towards all forms of property in Israel, including real estate (land) and movable property. Besides tangible property, economic rights are also usually treated as property, in addition to being covered by the law of obligations.

== Principles ==
The Jewish state was proclaimed on 14 May 1948 with its Declaration of Independence. The Provisional State Council's first legislative act was the "Law and Administration Ordinance of 1948", a reception statute. The act adopted all existing laws "with such modifications as may result from establishment of the State or its authorities." In respect of land law matters, Ottoman laws, as had been modified by British land law during the Mandate period, continued to apply. Most of these laws have been repealed by the last quarter of the 20th century.

Over time, a modern set of codificative statutes has been enacted. These are mostly a codification of common law norms, albeit with a notable continental influence. Chief among these are the Land Law, 1969 and the Movable Property Law, 1971. They are joined by a multitude of other legislative acts pertaining to property law, in addition to a highly detailed body of case law by the Supreme Court and lower courts. Some of the main tenets of Israeli property law are:

1. In land law, a system of title registration (Torrens title) is in place, allowing any person to quickly retrieve (usually through the internet) a summary of ownership and other rights towards any parcel of land. The legal transfer of land is only effectuated when a deed is executed and registered in the Israel Land Registry Bureau (also known as Tabo or Tabu; Hebrew: טאבו). Under the Torrens title system, the Land Registry serves as an absolute guarantee of the title, allowing for a relatively easy and safe negotiation of land transactions. As of 2016, about 4% of the country's land area is still registered under a pre-Torrens, deeds registration system.
2. Private property rights enjoy a fairly strong protection from encroachment, both by other private parties and by the government. Even when eminent domain is utilized, the government almost universally has to compensate for the fair value of the land.
3. While private ownership of land is common (mainly in urban areas), most of the land in Israel (over 90% of the land area) is in the ownership of either the State of Israel, the Development Authority (Rashut HaPituah), or the Jewish National Fund (JNF). According to Basic Law: Israel Lands, enacted in 1960, the land owned by these three bodies is administered by the Israel Land Authority (ILA). The land so owned is often leased to private persons, typically in a long-term lease for a period of 99 years. This creates a situation where, on the one hand, the land is privately held for most practical purposes; on the other hand, the ILA still wields a considerable bureaucratic power over citizens, particularly during the transfer of lease from one person to another, or various other procedures related to land use and registration, where the law requires consent or ongoing involvement by the ILA. Beginning in the first decade of the 21st century, the Knesset has enacted laws encouraging the full transfer of ownership, for no additional payment, from the ILA-represented bodies to the lessees, who thereby become owners.
4. The most common type of housing in Israel is condominiums. The Land Law, 1969 details the legal structure of this type of property, including the rights of tenants among themselves (mainly in regard to common areas) and towards third parties. A contractual document, the by-laws (Hebrew: תקנון; takanon), is required to exist for every condominium; often, the common by-laws, provided as an appendix to the Land Law, 1969, are used, but many condominiums do have more detailed by-laws, agreed between apartment owners.
5. The Land Law, 1969 enacts a "closed list" approach, listing five types of proprietary claims that may exist towards land: ownership, rental (including lease), mortgage, beneficial use and right of first refusal. However, in practice, other types of claims exist and are treated as equitable. In addition, a warning note or caveat (he'arat azhara) is regularly placed in the Land Registry after a transaction is agreed upon and before its registration is completed. In many cases, due to various impediments to completing the registration, the warning note remains on the Land Registry for decades, commonly perceived as providing a sufficient protection to the acquirer's interests.

== Overview ==
In 1945, of the 26.4 million dunams (26,400 km²) of land in Mandatory Palestine, 12.8 million (48%) was either owned or held in indefinite lease by Arabs, 1.5 million (6%) by Jews, 1.5 million (6%) was public land and 10.6 million (40%) constituted the desertic Beersheba district (Negev). Of the 9.2 million dunams of land that was arable (35% of the total land area), 7.8 million dunams (85%) was owned or used by Arabs, 1.2 million (13%) by Jews and 0.2 million (2%) was public land. By 1949, approximately 700,000 Palestinian Arabs had fled or been expelled from their lands and villages. Israel was now in control of some 20.5 million dunams (approx. 20,500 km²) or 78% of lands in what had been Mandatory Palestine: 8% (approx. 1,650 km²) were privately controlled by Jews, 6% (approx. 1,300 km²) by Arabs, with the remaining 86% being public land. Land laws were passed to legalize changes to land ownership.

As at 2007, the Israel Land Administration (ILA), which was established in 1960, manages 93% of Israel's land comprising 19,508 km² under the following laws and land policy. The remaining 7% of land is either privately owned or under the protection of religious authorities.

- Basic Law: Israel lands (1960) states that all the lands owned by the state of Israel will remain in state ownership, and will not be sold or given to anyone, but allows for the Knesset to override that ban on privatization by legislation.
- Israel Lands Law (1960) details several exceptions to the basic law.
- Israel Land Administration Law (1960) describes the details of establishing and operating the Israel Land Administration.
- Covenant between the State of Israel and the World Zionist Organization (WZO), establishing the Jewish National Fund (1960).

Thirteen percent of Israel's land belongs to the JNF, which is managed by the ILA.

Use of land in Israel usually means leasing rights from the ILA for a period of 49 or 98 years. Under Israeli law, the ILA cannot lease land to foreign nationals, which includes Palestinian residents of Jerusalem who have identity cards but are not citizens of Israel. In practice, foreigners may be allowed to lease if they show that they would qualify as Jewish under the Law of Return.

== History ==
=== Ottoman era ===
The Ottoman Empire embarked on a systematic land reform program in the second half of the 19th century. Two of the new laws were the 1858 land registration law and the 1873 land emancipation act. Prior to 1858, land in Palestine, then a part of the Ottoman Empire since 1516, was cultivated or occupied mainly by subsistence farmers. Land ownership was regulated by people living on the land according to customs and traditions. Usually, land was communally owned by village residents, though land could be owned by individuals or families.

The Ottoman Land Code of 1858 required land owners to register ownership. The reasons behind the law were twofold: (1) to increase tax revenue, and (2) to enable the government exercise greater state control over the area. However, many farmers did not register their claims, for several reasons: for example, land owners were subject to military service in the Ottoman Army, there was general opposition to official regulations from the Ottoman Empire, and to evade payment of taxes and registration fees to the Ottoman Empire.

The registration process itself was open to falsification and manipulation. Land collectively owned by village residents ended up being registered to one villager, and merchants and local Ottoman administrators took the opportunity to register large areas of land in their own name. The result was that land became registered to people who had never lived on the land; while the subsistence farmers, having lived there for generations, retained possession, but became tenants of absentee owners.

The 1873 land emancipation act gave Jews the right to own land in Palestine under their own name. This 1873 secular land reform/civil rights law was popularly confused with a religious law and it was held as a "humiliation to Islam that Jews should own a part of the Muslim Ummah". The confusion between religious and secular law made the laws (ended in 1873) against Jewish ownership of land 'religious laws'.

Over the course of the next decades land became increasingly concentrated on fewer hands; tenant farmers continued to work on the land, giving landlords a share of the harvest. This led to both an increased level of Palestinian nationalism as well as civil unrest. At the same time, the area witnessed an increased flow of Jewish immigrants who did not restrict themselves to the cities where their concentration offered some protection from persecution. These Jews came hoping to create a new future in what they regarded as the homeland of their ancestors. Organizations created to aid Jewish settlement in Palestine bought land from Arab and absentee landowners.

=== British Mandate ===
World War I and the dissolution of the Ottoman Empire led to British control over the area in 1917, followed by the creation of the Mandate for Palestine by the League of Nations in 1922, which remained in effect until the establishment of Israel in 1948. During this period several new land laws were introduced, including The Land Transfer Ordinance of 1920, The Correction of Land Registers Ordinance of 1926 and The Land Settlement Ordinance of 1928.

It was the policy of the WZO to encourage Jewish acquisition of land in Palestine for Jewish settlement. For that purpose, the Fifth Zionist Congress (1901) set up the JNF to buy suitable land. The rules of the JNF forbade it from selling the land it acquired, but to lease it. Land owned by the JNF was leased to kibbutzim and other Jewish settlements on long-term leases. At the end of 1935, JNF held 89,500 acres (362 km²) of land housing 108 Jewish communities. In 1939, 10% of the Jewish population of the British Mandate of Palestine lived on JNF land. JNF holdings by the end of the British Mandate period amounted to 936 km². By 1948, the JNF owned 54% of the land held by Jews in the region, or a bit less than 4% of the land in Palestine (excluding Transjordan).

From 1936, the British administration introduced a series of land regulations: The Land Transfer Regulations of 1940 divided the country into zones, with different restrictions on land sales in each. As summarized by the Anglo-American Committee of Inquiry in 1946,

In Zone A, consisting of about 63 percent of the country including the stony hills, land transfers save to a Palestinian Arab were in general forbidden. In Zone B. consisting of about 32 percent of the country, transfers from a Palestinian Arab save to another Palestinian Arab were severely restricted at the discretion of the High Commissioner. In the remainder of Palestine, consisting of about five percent of the country-which, however, includes the most fertile areas- land sales remained unrestricted.

The Inquiry recommended the repeal of the Regulations, without effect.

=== State of Israel ===
After Israel's declaration of independence on 14 May 1948, state lands of the Mandate reverted to the State of Israel. In addition, property left by Arab refugees passed into the control of the new Israeli government. The newly formed Israeli ministries, committees and departments took over functions performed earlier by 'National Institutions'. One of the first steps adopted by the new state was the reactivation of the Defence [Emergency] Regulations adopted earlier by the British in 1939 (and later repealed). Since British regulations had applied to the whole country, the Government of Israel passed the Law and Administration Ordinance [Amendment] Law [1948] to reverse the British repeal and reinstate these Emergency Regulations. Some of this land was sold by the government to the JNF, which had developed expertise in reclaiming and developing waste and barren lands and making them productive.

In 1960, under Basic Law: Israel Lands, JNF-owned land and government-owned land were together defined as "Israel lands," and the principle was laid down that such land would be leased rather than sold. The JNF retained ownership of its land, but administrative responsibility for the JNF land and government-owned land, passed to a newly created agency called the Israel Land Administration or ILA. The lease principle is hardly new to the area however as it was practiced for centuries under the Ottoman tapu system. To this day, the office that handles land registration in Israel is commonly known as the tabu (the Arabic pronunciation of the Turkish tapu).

== Emergency laws and regulations ==
=== Proclamation, 5708-1948 ===
The proclamation repealed the White Paper of 1939 and sections 13 and 15 of the Immigration Ordinance of 1941.

It also repealed the Land Transfer Regulations of 1940 retroactively to 18 May 1939, invalidating transactions conducted since then.

=== Law and Administration Ordinance, 5708-1948 ===
defined the competences and composition of the Provisional Government. The law repealed sections 13 to 15 of the 1941 Immigration Ordinance and regulations 102 to 107C of the 1945 Defence (Emergency) Regulations, in order to allow Jews who entered the country illegally under Mandate to remain as legal immigrants. The 1940 Land Transfers Regulations were repealed retroactively from 18 May 1939, to allow unregistered transfers to be filed. In 1967, the law was used for de facto annexation of East Jerusalem.

=== Area of Jurisdiction and Powers Ordinance, 5708-1948 ===
After the 1948 Arab–Israeli War, the Area of Jurisdiction and Powers Ordinance, 5708-1948, extended Israeli land laws to "any part of Palestine which the Minister of Defence has defined by proclamation as being held by the Defence Army of Israel" Article 3 of the law made it retroactive and effective from 15 May 1948, the day after the declaration of the establishment of the State of Israel.

=== Abandoned Areas Ordinance, 5708-1948 ===
(published 30 June 1948, effective retroactively from 16 May 1948) defined an "abandoned area" as "any area or place conquered by or surrendered to armed forces or deserted by all or part of its inhabitants, and which has been declared by order to be an abandoned area". The Ordinance also provided for regulating "the expropriation and confiscation of movable and immovable property, within any abandoned area". The government was authorised to determine what would be done with this property.

=== Defence (Emergency) Regulations ===
==== Article 125 ====
Article 125 states:

A Military Commander may by order declare any area or place to be a closed area for the purposes of these regulations. Any person who, during any period in which any such order is in force in relation to any area or place, enters or leaves that area or place without a permit in writing issued by or on behalf of the Military Commander shall be guilty of an offence against these Regulations.

According to Kirshbaum, the law was used to exclude a land owner from his own land so that it could be expropriated under the Land Acquisition (Validation of Acts and Compensation) Law (1953).

=== Emergency Regulations (Security Zones) Law, 5709-1949 ===
According to the Journal of Palestine Studies, the law designated an area as "security zone" which meant that no one could permanently live in, enter, or be in said zone. According to COHRE and BADIL (p. 40), "this measure was used extensively in various parts of the country, including areas in the Galilee, near the Gaza Strip and close to the borders. Lands so acquired would often be sold to the JNF. These regulations remained in place until 1972."

=== Emergency Regulations (Cultivation of Waste [Uncultivated] Lands) Law, 5709-1948 ===
According to COHRE and BADIL (p. 40) this law—Emergency Regulations (Cultivation of Waste Lands) Law, 5709-1948 (source in Hebrew)—was amended in 1951 as the Emergency Regulations (Cultivation of Waste Lands) Law, 5711-1951. This law authorises the Ministry of Agriculture to declare lands as 'waste' lands (Article 2) and to take control over 'uncultivated' lands (Article 4). Article 2 states:

The Minister of Agriculture may warn the owner of waste land to cultivate the land or to ensure-that it is cultivated.

Article 4 reads:

If the owner of the waste land does not apply to the Minister of Agriculture as specified in regulation 3, or if the Minister of Agriculture is not satisfied that the owner of the land has begun or is about to begin or will continue to cultivate the land, the Minister of Agriculture may assume control of the land in order to ensure its cultivation.

COHRE and BADIL (p. 40) consider that "this law operated in conjunction with other laws including those declaring ‘security areas’. Once people (Arabs) were barred from their lands, these could be defined as ‘uncultivated’ and seized".

=== Emergency Land Requisition (Regulation) Law, 5710-1949 ===
This law repeals the earlier Emergency Regulations (Requisition of Property) Law, 5709-1948. The law authorises the requisition of land when (Article 3):

...the making of the order is necessary for the defence of the state, public security, the maintenance of essential supplies or essential public services, the absorption of immigrants or the rehabilitation of ex-soldiers or war invalids.

The law includes clauses concerning the requisition of houses (chapter three), and states (Article 22b) that:

A competent authority may use force to the extent required for the carrying into effect of an order made by a competent authority or a decision given by an appeal committee under this Law.

According to COHRE and BADIL (p. 41), "the law retroactively legalised land and housing requisitions that were carried out under existing emergency regulations. The law was amended in 1952 and 1953. A 1955 amendment, Land Requisition Regulation (Temporary Provision) Law, 5715- 1955, allows the Government to retain property seized under the law for longer than the three years originally specified. Along with a later (1957) amendment, the law also specified that any property held after 1956 would be determined to have been acquired on the basis of the British Land (Acquisition for Public Purposes) Ordinance of 1943.

== Absentees' Property Laws ==
The absentees' property laws were several laws which were first introduced as emergency ordinances issued by the Jewish leadership but which after the war were incorporated into the laws of Israel. As examples of the first type of laws are the Emergency Regulations (Absentees’ Property) Law, 5709-1948 (December) which according to article 37 of the Absentees Property Law, 5710-1950 was replaced by the latter; the Emergency Regulations (Requisition of Property) Law, 5709-1949, and other related laws.

According to COHRE and BADIL (p. 41), unlike other laws that were designed to establish Israel’s legal control over lands, this body of law focused on formulating a legal definition for the people (mostly Arabs) who had left or been forced to flee from these lands. Specific laws in this category include:

- The Absentees' Property Law, 5710- 1950
- The Land Acquisition (Validation of Acts and Compensation) Law, 5713-1953
- Absentees' Property (Eviction) Law, 5718-1958
- Absentees' Property (Amendment No.3) (Release and Use of Endowment Property) Law, 5725-1965
- Absentees' Property (Amendment No.4) (Release and Use of Property of Evangelical Episcopal Church) Law, 5727-1967
- Absentees' Property (Compensation) Law, 5733-1973

On 15 July 1948—just two days after the fall of Ramle—Dov Shafrir was appointed the first Israeli Custodian of Absentees' Property. Originally from Ukraine, the 50s-ish Shafrir had previously held a position in the agricultural construction division of Israel's Neve Oved Company. As a result of the law, two million dunams were confiscated and handed over to Shafrir, who later transferred the land to the development authority. This law created the novel citizenship category of "present absentees" (nifkadim nohahim), persons present at the time but considered absent for the purpose of the law. These Israeli Arabs enjoyed all civil rights-including the right to vote in the Knesset elections-except one: the right to use and dispose of their property. About 30,000-35,000 Palestinians became "present absentees".

Shafrir derived inspiration for his government's policy from precedent in the resettlement policies of Pakistan during the partition of India. While he openly spoke of prioritising handicapped and other demobilised soldiers for receiving property benefits, the reality was that others were awarded first stakes. In Salama, houses were invaded and settled by unknown parties, while in nearby Jaffa, the situation was even more chaotic: Invasions and counter-invasions by new immigrants, soldiers and others forced the government to finally bestow ownership rights on the homes' current occupants. According to Simha Flapan, "a detailed account of exactly how abandoned Arab property assisted in the absorption of the new immigrants was prepared by Joseph Schechtman":

It is difficult to overestimate the tremendous role this lot of abandoned Arab property has played in the settlement of hundreds of thousands of Jewish immigrants who have reached Israel since the proclamation of the state in May 1948. Forty-seven new rural settlements established on the sites of abandoned Arab villages had by October 1949 already absorbed 25,255 new immigrants. By the spring of 1950 over 1 million dunams had been leased by the custodian to Jewish settlements and individual farmers for the raising of grain crops.

Large tracts of land belonging to Arab absentees have also been leased to Jewish settlers, old and new, for the raising of vegetables. In the south alone, 15,000 dunams of vineyards and fruit trees have been leased to cooperative settlements; a similar area has been rented by the Yemenites Association, the Farmers Association, and the Soldiers Settlement and Rehabilitation Board. This has saved the Jewish Agency and the government millions of dollars. While the average cost of establishing an immigrant family in a new settlement was from $7,500 to $9,000, the cost in abandoned Arab villages did not exceed $1,500 ($750 for building repairs and $750 for livestock and equipment).

Abandoned Arab dwellings in towns have also not remained empty. By the end of July 1948, 170,000 people, notably new immigrants and ex-soldiers, in addition to about 40,000 former tenants, both Jewish and Arab, had been housed in premises under the custodian's control; and 7,000 shops, workshops and stores were sublet to new arrivals. The existence of these Arab houses-vacant and ready for occupation-has, to a large extent, solved the greatest immediate problem which faced the Israeli authorities in the absorption of immigrants. It also considerably relieved the financial burden of absorption.

How much of Israel's territory consists of land confiscated with the Absentee Property Law is uncertain and much disputed. Robert Fisk interviewed the Israeli Custodian of Absentee Property, who estimates this could amount to up to 70% of the territory of the state of Israel:

The Custodian of Absentee Property does not choose to discuss politics. But when asked how much of the land of the state of Israel might potentially have two claimants — an Arab and a Jew holding respectively a British Mandate and an Israeli deed to the same property — Mr. Manor [the Custodian in 1980] believes that 'about 70 percent' might fall into that category.

— Robert Fisk, 'The Land of Palestine, Part Eight: The Custodian of Absentee Property', The Times, December 24, 1980, quoted in his book Pity the Nation: Lebanon at War

The JNF, from Jewish Villages in Israel, 1949:

Of the entire area of the State of Israel only about 300,000-400,000 dunums – apart from the desolate rocky area of the southern Negev, at present quite unfit for cultivation – are State Domain which the Israeli Government took over from the Mandatory regime. The J.N.F. and private Jewish owners possess under two million dunums. Almost all the rest belongs at law to Arab owners, many of whom have left the country. The fate of these Arabs will be settled when the terms of the peace treaties between Israel and her Arab neighbours are finally drawn up. The J.N.F., however, cannot wait until then to obtain the land it requires for its pressing needs. It is, therefore, acquiring part of the land abandoned by the Arab owners, through the Government of Israel, the sovereign authority in Israel. Whatever the ultimate fate of the Arabs concerned, it is manifest that their legal right to their land and property in Israel, or to the monetary value of them, will not be waived, nor do the Jews wish to ignore them. ... [C]onquest by force of arms cannot, in law or in ethics, abrogate the rights of the legal owner to his personal property. The J.N.F., therefore, will pay for the lands it takes over, at a fixed and fair price.

The absentee property played an enormous role in making Israel a viable state. In 1954, more than one third of Israel's Jewish population lived on absentee property and nearly a third of the new immigrants (250,000 people) settled in urban areas abandoned by Arabs. Of 370 new Jewish settlements established between 1948 and 1953, 350 were on absentee property (Peretz, Israel and the Palestinian Arabs, 1958).

=== The Absentees’ Property Law, 5710- 1950 ===
This law replaced the Emergency Regulations (Absentees’ Property) Law, 5709-1948. According to Sabri Jiryis (p. 84), the definition of "absentee" in the law was framed in such a way as to ensure that it applied to every Palestinian or resident in Palestine who had left his usual place of residence in Palestine for any place inside or outside the country after the adoption of the partition of Palestine resolution by the UN. Article 1(b) states that "absentee" means:

"absentee" means -

(1) a person who, at any time during the period between the 16th Kislev, 5708 (29th November, 1947) and the day on which a declaration is published, under section 9(d) of the Law and Administration Ordinance, 5708-1948(1), that the state of emergency declared by the Provisional Council of State on the 10th Iyar, 5708 (19th May, 1948)
(2) has ceased to exist, was a legal owner of any property situated in the area of Israel or enjoyed or held it, whether by himself or through another, and who, at any time during the said period -

(i) was a national or citizen of the Lebanon, Egypt, Syria, Saudi Arabia, Trans-Jordan, Iraq or the Yemen, or
(ii) was in one of these countries or in any part of Palestine outside the area of Israel, or
(iii) was a Palestinian citizen and left his ordinary place of residence in Palestine

(a) for a place outside Palestine before the 27th Av, 5708 (1st September, 1948); or
(b) for a place in Palestine held at the time by forces which sought to prevent the establishment of the State of Israel or which fought against it after its establishment;

(2) a body of persons which, at any time during the period specified in paragraph (1), was a legal owner of any property situated in the area of Israel or enjoyed or held such property, whether by itself or through another, and all the members, partners, shareholders, directors or managers of which are absentees within the meaning of paragraph (1), or the management of the business of which is otherwise decisively controlled by such absentees, or all the capital of which is in the hands of such absentees;

According to COHRE and BADIL (p. 41), the provisions in the law made sure that the term 'person' did not apply to Jews. The law also applied to Arabs who had become citizens of the State of Israel but were not in their usual place of residence as defined by the law. In this case, they were referred to as 'present absentees' and many lost their lands.

The Law then appointed a Custodianship Council for Absentees' Property, whose president was to be known as the Custodian of Absentees' Property (Article 2). The law then made these properties the legal holdings of the Custodian. According to Art. 4.(a)(2):

every right an absentee had in any property shall pass automatically to the Custodian at the time of the vesting of the property; and the status of the Custodian shall be the same as was that of the owner of the property.

According to COHRE and BADIL (p. 41), those who were found to occupy property in violation of this law could be expelled, and those who built on such property could have their structures demolished. The law came to apply not only to Palestinians who fled but also to those who were away from their regular places of residence (as described in the previous paragraph).

According to the Israel Government Yearbook, 5719 (1958) (p. 235), the "village properties" of absentee Arabs "which was appropriated by the Custodian of Absentees' Property" included "[the land of] some 350 completely abandoned or semi-abandoned [Arab] villages, the aggregate area of which was about three-quarters of a million dunums .... Among the agricultural properties were 80,000 dunums of abandoned groves... [and] more than 200,000 dunums of plantations were taken over by the custodian. "It was estimated that "the urban properties ... include[d] 25,416 buildings in which there are 57,497 dwellings and 10,727 business and trade premises."

According to COHRE and BADIL (p. 41), "estimates of the total amount of ‘abandoned’ lands to which Israel laid claim vary between 4.2 and 5.8 million dunum (4 200-5 800 km²). Between 1948 and 1953 alone, 350 of the 370 new Jewish settlements were created on lands confiscated under the Absentees’ Property Law."

The Absentees’ Property Law underwent several amendments, including:

- ,
- .

Both amendments clarifying rental arrangements and tenant protection rights on such property.

- and subsequent amendments to the latter.

=== Land Acquisition (Validation of Acts and Compensation) Law, 5713-1953 ===
According to COHRE and BADIL (p. 42), the Government of Israel did not automatically gain title to lands seized under the Absentees’ Property Law. This was accomplished under the Land Acquisition (Validation of Acts and Compensation) Law, 5713-1953. This law legalised expropriations (retroactively in many cases) for military purposes or for the establishment of (Israeli) settlements.

The law allows the Government to claim the property of lands which are not in the possession of its owner as of 1 April 1952. Article 2 (a) states:

Property in respect of which the Minister certifies by certificate under his hand--

(1) that on the 6th Nisan, 5712 (1st April, 1952) it was not in the possession of its owners; and
(2) that within the period between the 5th Iyar, 5708 (14th May, 1948) and the 6th Nisan, 5712 (Ist April 1952) it was used or assigned for purposes of essential development, settlement or security; and
(3) that it is still required for any of these purposes

The further states the monetary compensation for those losing their lands and that in the case were the lands corresponded to agricultural lands, where those lands formed their main source of livelihood, lands elsewhere would be offered. Article 3 reads:

(a) The owners of acquired property are entitled to compensation therefore from the Development Authority. The compensation shall be given in money, unless otherwise agreed between the owners and the Development Authority. The amount of compensation shall be fixed by agreement between the Development Authority and the owners or, in the absence of agreement, by the Court, as hereinafter provided.

(b) Where the acquired property was used for agriculture and was the main source of livelihood of its owner, and he has no other land sufficient for his livelihood, the Development Authority shall, on his demand, offer him other property, either for ownership or for lease, as full or partial compensation. A competent authority, to be appointed for this purpose by the Minister, shall, in accordance with rules to be prescribed by regulations, determine the category, location, area, and, in the case of lease, period of lease (not less than 49 years) and the value of the offered property, both for the purpose of calculating the compensation and for determination of the sufficiency of such property for a livelihood.

(c) The provisions of subsection (b) shall add to, and not derogate from, the provisions of subsection (a).

According to Alexandre Kedar (p. 153), until 1959, compensation was calculated on the basis of the 1950 land values. The author cites a 1965 ILA report which shows that over 1.2 million dunum (about 1 200 km²) of Arab land were taken in this manner.

=== The Absentees’ Property (Amendment No.3) (Release and Use of Endowment Property) Law, 5725-1965 ===
This law extends the scope of the Absentees' Property Law and earlier regulations concerning the Muslim religious endowment, the Waqf. Article 29A (c) states:

For the purposes of this section and of sections 29B to 29H, "endowment property" means Muslim waqf property being immovable property validly dedicated.

According to COHRE and BADIL (p. 41), it allows the Government to confiscate vast amounts of Muslim (charity) land and other properties, including cemeteries and mosques, and place them under Government administration. According to the law, income from these properties would be used in part to build institutions and provide services for the Muslim inhabitants in areas where such property is located. The law amends the 1950 law in the following way:

In section 4 of the Absentees' Property Law, 5710-1950(1) (hereinafter referred to as "the principal Law"), the following subsection shall be inserted after subsection (a):

(1) Where any property is an endowment under any law, the ownership thereof shall vest in the Custodian free from any restriction, qualification or other similar limitation prescribed, whether before or after the vesting, by or under any law or document relating to the endowment if the owner of the property, or the person having possession or the right of management of the property, or the beneficiary of the endowment, is an absentee. The vesting shall be as from the 10th Kislev, 5709 (12th December, 1948) or from the day on which one of the aforementioned becomes an absentee, whichever is the later date.
(2) The provisions of this subsection shall not void any restriction, qualification or other similar limitation prescribed by or under this Law or imposed by the Custodian and shall not void any transactions effected by him.".

(b) This section shall have effect retroactively as from the date of the coming into force of the principal Law.

According to Meron Benvenisti:

"Most Waqf property in Israel was expropriated under the Absentee proberty Law (giving rise to the sarcastic quip -"Apparently God is an absentee [in Israel]") and afterward handed over to the Development Authority, ostensibly because this was necessary to prevent its being neglected, but actually so as to make it possible to sell it. Only about one-third of Muslim Waqf property, principally mosques and graveyards that were currently in use, was not expropriated. In 1956 its administration was turned over to the Board of Trustees of the Muslim Waqf, which by then was made up of collaborators appointed by the authorities. These "trustees" would sell or "exchange" land with the ILA without any accountability to the Muslim community. Anger over these deeds led to acts of violence within the community, including assassinations.".

=== The Absentees’ Property (Compensation) Law, 5733-1973 ===
This law establishes the procedure to compensate owners of lands which have been confiscated under the Absentees’ Property Law (1950). It establishes the requirements to be eligible for compensation (Article 1):

The persons entitled to compensation are all those who were Israel residents on 1 July 1973, or became residents thereafter, and prior to the property becoming vested in the Custodian of Absentees' Property were

1.the owners of property, including their heirs, or
2.the tenants only of urban property, including spouses living with them at the last mentioned date, or
3.the lessees of property, or
4.the owners of any easement in property.

Other provisions specify the time limit legally allowed for filing a claim, whether compensation would be awarded in cash or bonds (depending on circumstances), the payment schedule (generally over a fifteen-year period) and other provisions. Appended to the law is a detailed schedule of how compensation is to be calculated for each type of property, urban or agricultural. Some provisions of this law were amended in later years.

== Laws enacted to legalise further acquisition of depopulated lands, and related laws ==
=== Land (Acquisition for Public Purposes) Ordinance (1943) ===
This ordinance was originally enacted by the British in 1943 and later used by Israel to authorise the confiscation of lands for government and ‘public’ purposes (see eminent domain). These included building government offices, creating lands and parks, and suchlike. Kedar (p. 155) describes this law as “the main general land expropriation law in force in Israel today”.

A 1964 amendment to this law, Acquisition for Public Purposes (Amendment of Provisions) Law, 5724-1964, specifies procedures to be followed in the acquisition of lands based on this and other laws, including the original Land (Acquisition for Public Purposes) Ordinance (1943), the Town Planning Ordinance (1936), and the Roads and Railways (Defence and Development) Ordinance (1943).

The 1964 amendment also defines circumstances under which no compensation would be offered to those whose lands had been expropriated; generally, where the expropriation had occurred prior to the coming into force of this law. Additional amendments corrected various laws under which such lands might be expropriated, substituting Israeli laws for earlier British versions and clarifying rights to compensation.

According to COHRE and BADIL (p. 43), Israel used this law extensively to expropriate Palestinians lands. Many Palestinians challenged the expropriations and did not accept compensation. A 1978 amendment to the law, Acquisition for Public Purposes (Amendment of Provisions) (Amendment No.3) Law, 5738-1978, addresses this issue by decreeing that where the owner refuses compensation or does not give consent within the time allotted, these funds would be deposited with the Administrator-General in the name of the owner. However, this provision has no bearing on the matter of the expropriation itself. According to the COHRE and BADIL study, lands acquired under this law were used for the building of new Jewish settlements or other ventures from which Arab Palestinians with Israeli citizenship were excluded. The Jewish-dominated sector of Upper Nazareth was created in this manner and was the subject of several lawsuits filed at the Supreme Court.

=== Jerusalem Military Government (Validation of Acts) Ordinance, 5709-1949 ===
According to COHRE and BADIL (p. 41), this law extends Israeli jurisdiction to ‘the Occupied Area of Jerusalem’ (the western part of Jerusalem that was incorporated into Israel in 1948). It declares that all orders and regulations enacted by the Military Governor or other Government ministries shall be given the force of law.

=== Development Authority (Transfer of Property) Law, 5710-1950 ===
According to COHRE and BADIL (p. 42), the ‘Authority for the Development of the Country’ (or the ‘Development Authority’) was established to work with relevant Government agencies to acquire and prepare lands for the benefit of newly arriving Jewish immigrants. Vast amounts of land allocated for this purpose were bought from the ‘Custodian of Absentee Property’. Pursuant to this law, lands passing into the hands of the State or to JNF control would be deemed inalienable. Article 3(4)(a) reads:

The Development Authority is competent:

to sell or otherwise dispose of, let, grant leases of, and mortgage property;provided that

(a) the Development Authority shall not be authorised to sell, or otherwise transfer the right of ownership of, property passing into public ownership, except to the State, to the Jewish National Fund, to an institution approved by the Government, for the purposes of this paragraph, as an institution for the settlement of landless Arabs, or to a local authority; the right of ownership of land so acquired may not be re-transferred except, with the consent of the Development Authority, to one of the bodies mentioned in this subparagraph;
(b) the Development Authority shall not be authorised to sell immovable property not being land passing into public ownership, unless such property has first been offered to the Jewish National Fund, and the Jewish National Fund has not agreed to acquire it within a period fixed by the Development Authority;
(c) the total area of immovable property, not being land passing into public ownership, which the Development Authority may sell, or the right of ownership of which it may otherwise transfer, shall not exceed 100,000 dunams, but immovable property acquired by any of the bodies mentioned in subparagraph (a) shall not be taken into account for the purposes of this subparagraph;
(d) the sale, or the transfer of the right of ownership in any other way, of immovable property, being land passing into public ownership or other immovable property, shall be effected by decision of the Government in each individual case;

=== Prescription Law, 5718-1958 ===
The Prescription Law was first enacted in 1958 and amended in 1965. It repeals critical provisions of, and reverses British practices in relation to, the Ottoman Land Code (1858).

According to COHRE and BADIL (p. 44), the Prescription Law is one of the most critical to understanding the legal underpinnings of Israel’s acquisition of Palestinian lands. Although not readily apparent in the language of the law, the purpose behind this legislation was to enable Israel to claim as ‘State lands’ areas where Palestinians still predominated and where they could still assert their own claims on the land (for example, in the north of the country). The authors claim that this law, in conjunction with the Land (Settlement of Title) Ordinance (Amendment) Law, 5720-1960, the Land (Settlement of Title) Ordinance (New Version), 5729-1969 and the Land Law, 5729-1969, was designed to revise criteria related to the use and registration of Miri lands – one of the most prevalent types in Palestine – and to facilitate Israel’s acquisition of such land.

Under this law, farmers are required to submit documentation proving uninterrupted cultivation of designated plots of land over a 15-year period (the ‘prescription’ period). Article 5 states:

The period within which a claim in respect of which an action has not been brought shall be prescribed (such period being hereinafter referred to as "the period of prescription") shall be

(1) in the case of a claim not relating to land — seven years;
(2) in the case of a claim relating to land — fifteen years or, if the land has been registered in the land register after settlement of title in accordance with the Land (Settlement of Title) Ordinance(1), twenty-five years.

The law adds the proviso that lands purchased after 1 March 1943 would be subject to a 20-year verification period. The law also specifies a five-year hiatus between 1958 and 1963 that would not be counted toward this ‘prescription’ period.

According to COHRE and BADIL, by 1963, much of the lands in question had still not been surveyed. Therefore, calculations of the requisite 20-year verification period were in effect halted, and the State was in a position to press its own claims to these lands. The authors consider that the Prescription Law had even more complex ramifications. For example, Israel decided that British aerial photographs of 1945 would be used to verify cultivation. Arab farmers who had not yet begun tilling their lands at the time the photographs were taken found they were by definition unable to meet the requisite 15-year ‘prescription’ period. Also, as Israel did not accept other evidence of cultivation, such as tax records, many Palestinians fell victim to a ‘Catch-22’: in the process of trying to establish their legal ownership they (retroactively) lost their lands.

According to COHRE and BADIL a 1965 report by the Israeli Land Administration (ILA) reflects on the rationale behind the law:

In the Northern area, there was a danger of the [acquisition of rights] by prescription according to the Statute of Limitation (1958) regarding all State land, and those [lands] of the Custodian of Absentee Property and the Development Authority. Particularly in the area of the [Arab] minorities where various elements began to take over State land and those of the Development Authority, and [sic] there was worry that these lands would be taken away from the hand of the ILA [Israeli Land Administration] and be transferred to the ownership of the trespassers.

== See also ==
- 1948 Palestinian expulsion and flight
- Depopulated Palestinian locations in Israel
- Transfer Committee
- Israeli law
- Israel Land Authority
- Palestinian land laws
