= HaYovel Tower =

- מגדל היובל
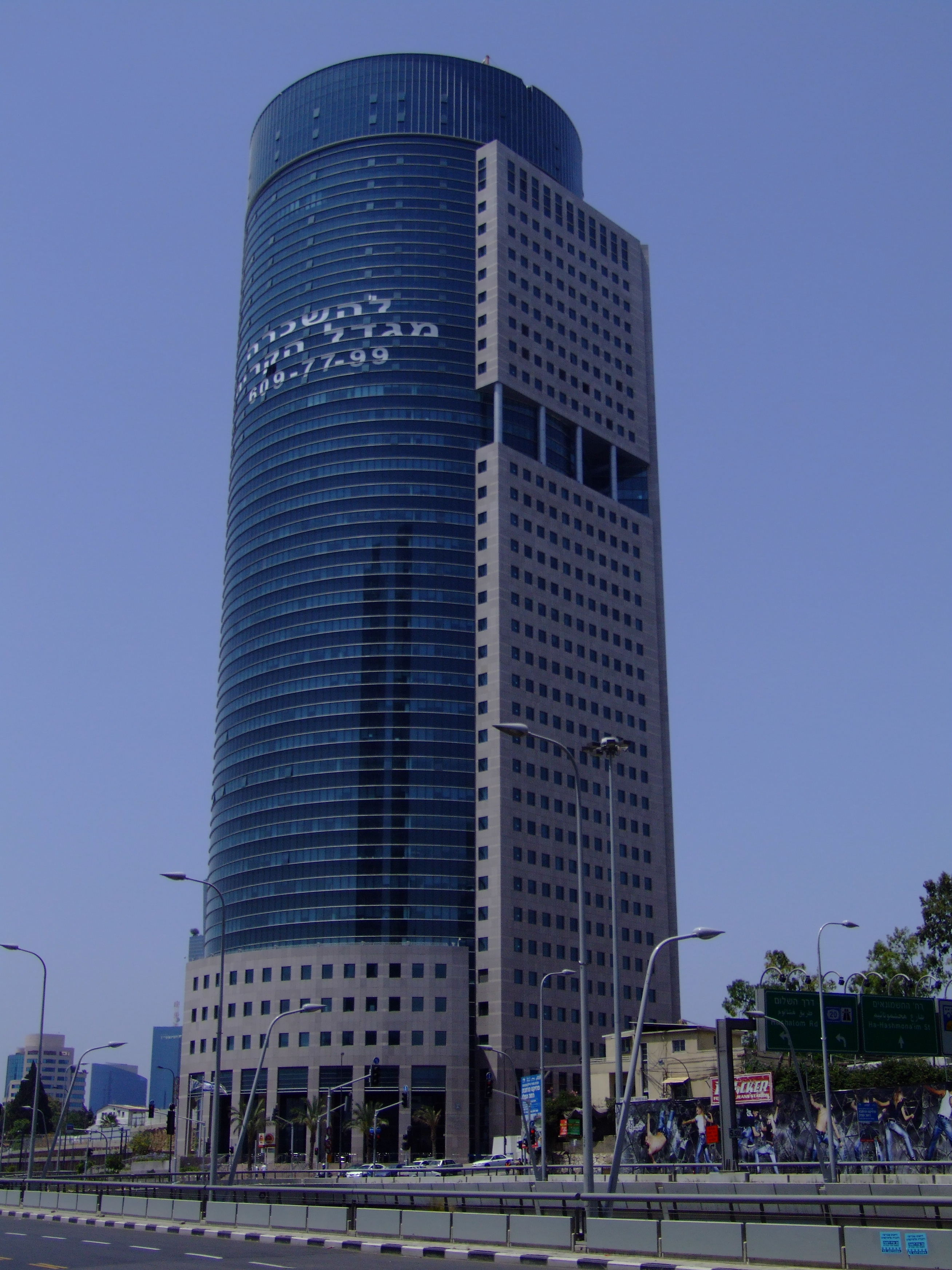
- HaYovel Tower in June 2006

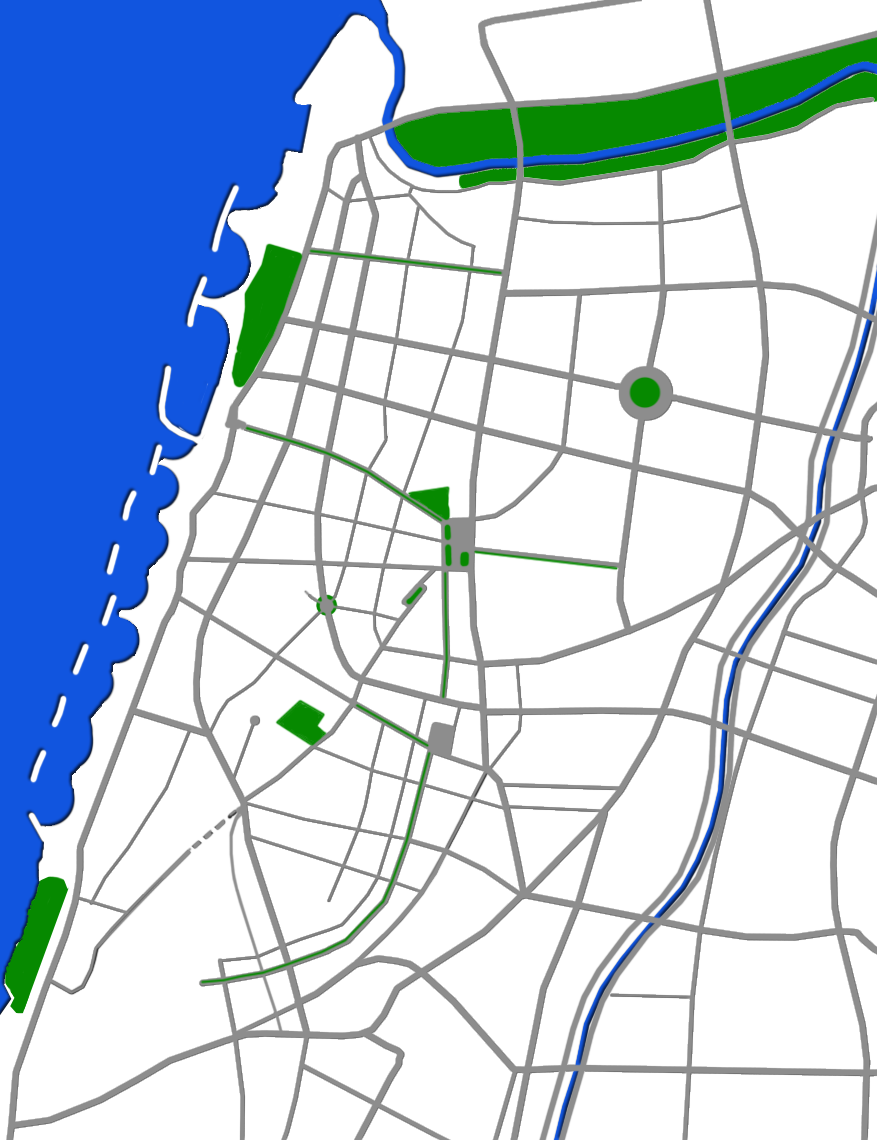
- Location within Tel Aviv

General information
- Status: Completed
- Type: Offices
- Architectural style: Postmodern
- Location: Tel Aviv, Israel
- Coordinates: 32°4′22.61″N 34°47′21.16″E
- Construction started: 2001
- Opening: 2005
- Cost: $450 million

Height
- Roof: 158 m (518 ft)

Technical details
- Floor count: 42
- Floor area: 110,000 m^{2} (1,200,000 sq ft)

Design and construction
- Architect: Peleg Architects
- Developer: Africa-Israel, Minrav

HaYovel Tower (Hebrew: מגדל היובל, lit. 'Jubilee Tower') also known as Kiryat HaMemshala Tower (Hebrew: מגדל קריית הממשלה, lit. 'Government Complex Tower') is a skyscraper in Tel Aviv, Israel. At 158 m (42 floors), it is the 20th tallest building in Israel. Construction was completed in 2005 on land previously belonging to the IDF HaKirya base. The tower is located near the Tel Aviv's tallest skyscraper cluster, the Azrieli Center complex, and is occupied largely by government offices. The consolidation of many of these offices in the tower, which were previously spread out all over the Tel Aviv district, allowed the release of a considerable amount of high-value government land to private development, as well as introducing efficiencies from housing many government functions under one roof. The tower has a helipad on its roof. It was originally planned to have 28 floors for government functions only, with the additional 14 floors being approved during construction. 13 of these top floors were approved for use by private sector offices, and the top 11 floors have floor-to ceiling windows. An external elevator serves the uppermost floors, and an underpass connects the building with the tower's underground parking. The rent being paid by the government is $16/square metre per month for the next 20 years.

== Design ==
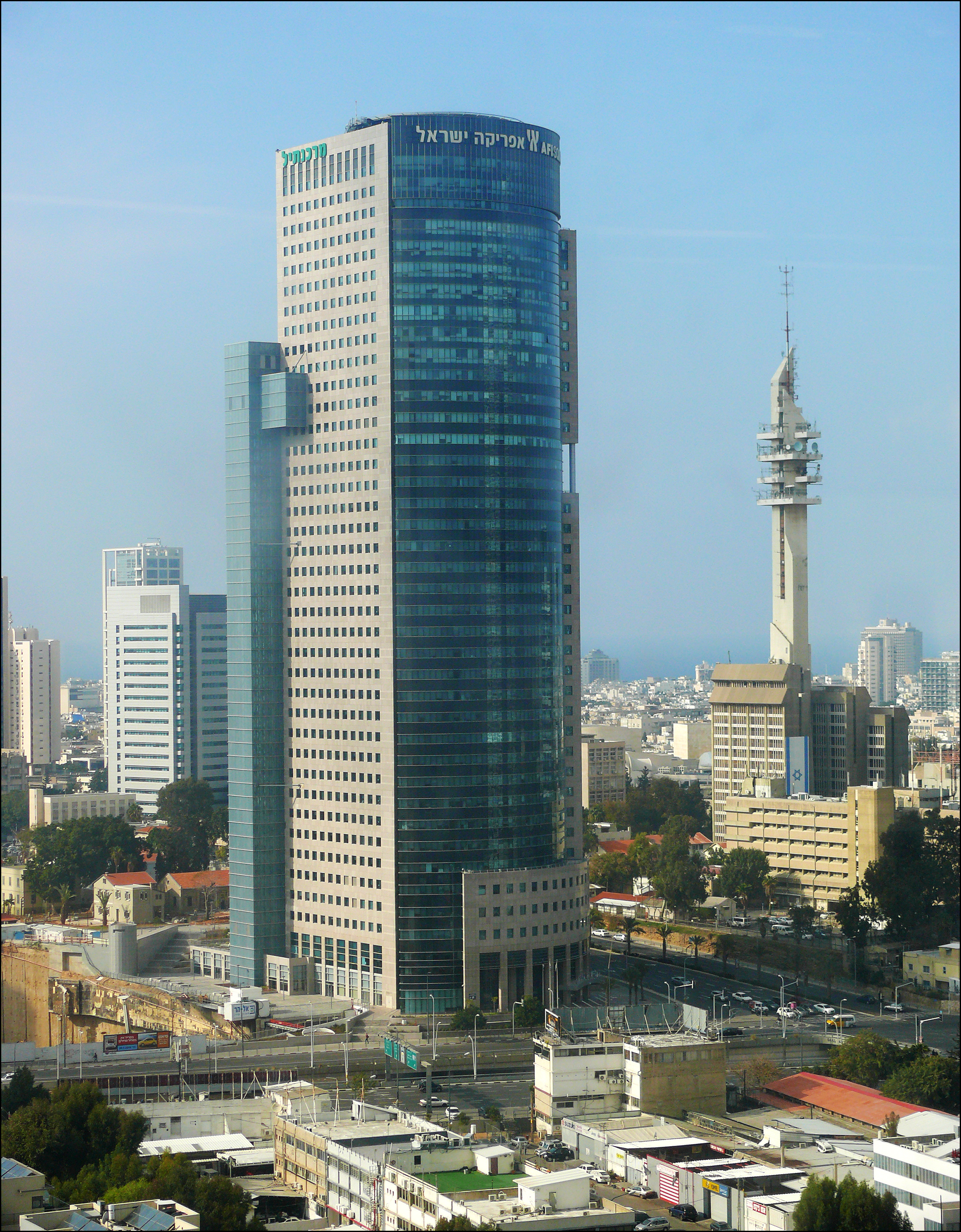
HaYovel Tower at a midday, before the completion of the Sarona Tower

The design of the building, which used postmodern architecture, was led by Peleg Architects. The building is mostly made of concrete, however its facade consists of such materials as granite, glass and aluminium, which were colored in dark green. The exterior walls of floors above 31 are fully glazed from floor to ceiling.
