= HaKirya =

Area in central Tel Aviv, Israel

- Tel Aviv-Yafo
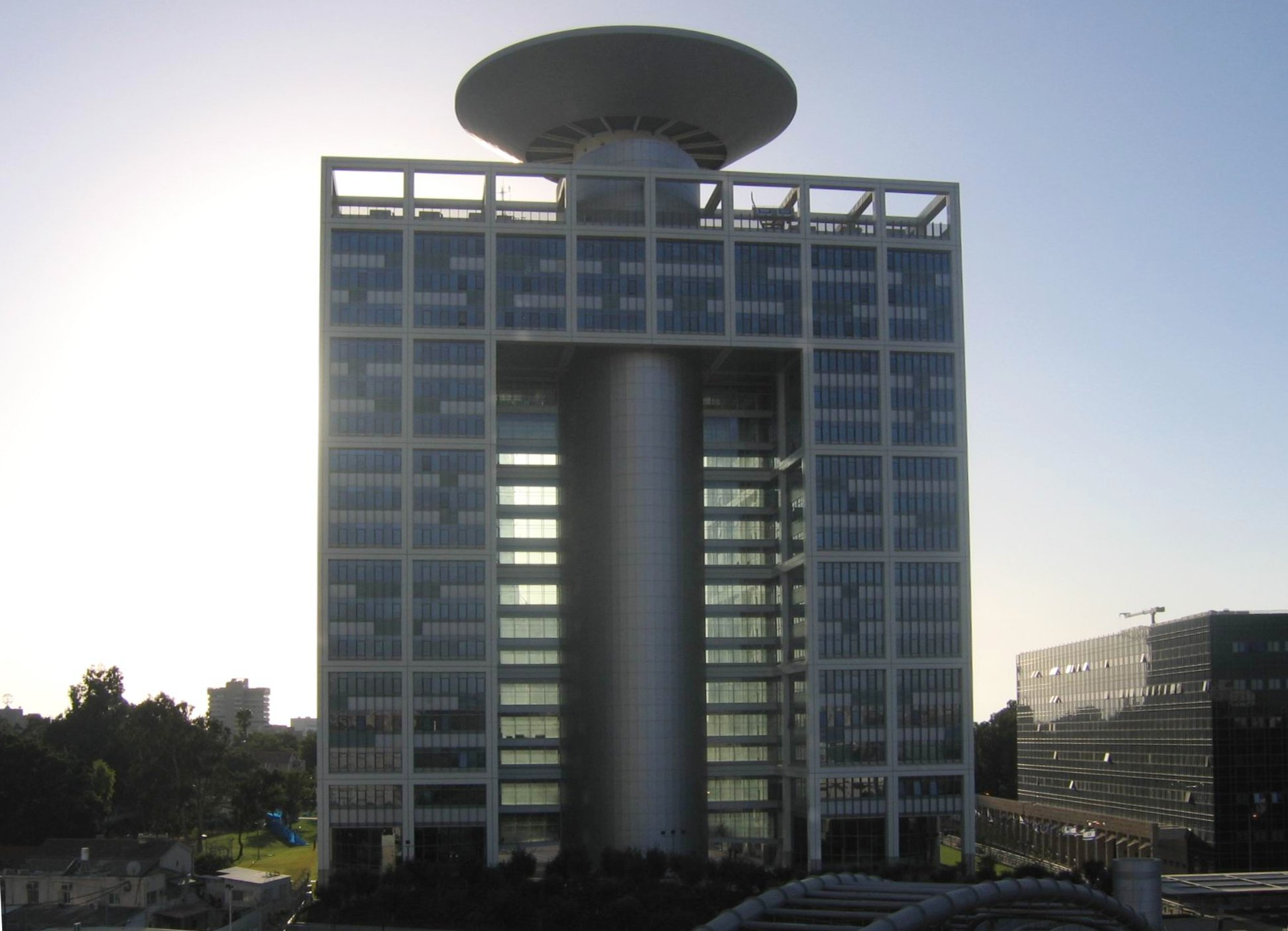
- Matcal Tower, headquarters of the IDF General Staff and the Ministry of Defense

Site information
- Type: Military headquarters
- Controlled by: Israel

Location
- Coordinates: 32°4′29.25″N 34°47′16.62″E

Site history
- In use: 1948–present

HaKirya, or The Kirya (Hebrew: הַקִּרְיָה, lit. 'The Campus'), is an area in central Tel Aviv, consisting of an urban military base north of Kaplan Street.

HaKirya contains the Tel Aviv District's government center and the major Israel Defense Forces (IDF) base Camp Rabin (Hebrew: מַחֲנֶה רַבִּין, Mahaneh Rabin), named for prime minister Yitzhak Rabin, also known as Hakirya Base. It was one of the first IDF bases and has served as the IDF's headquarters since its founding in 1948. The base serves mainly command, administrative, communications, and support functions.

== History ==
=== Ottoman era ===
Much of the Kirya today is located on the lands of Sarona, a Templer settlement founded in the 19th century. Sarona was an agricultural colony, and kept this nature despite the expansion of Tel Aviv and attempts by the city to buy some of Sarona's lands.

=== British Mandate ===
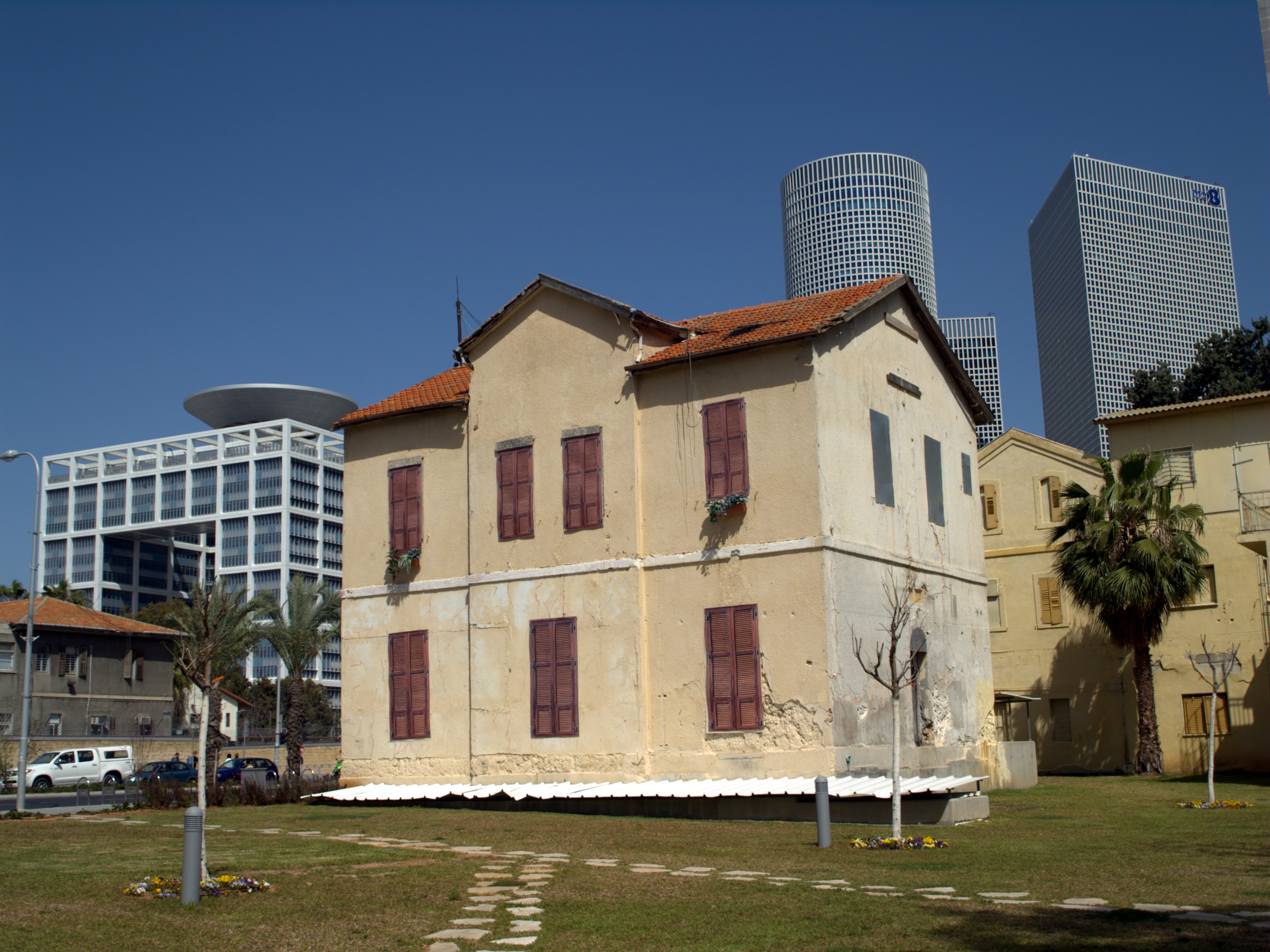
The remains of German Templer buildings of Sarona in HaKirya

In World War II, British forces took control of Sarona and converted it into a prison camp for Germans. After the war, the German prisoners were deported, mostly to Australia, and Sarona became a British military and police base. The base was the site of the first-ever unconcealed Haganah attack on a British installation.

The base was taken over by the Haganah on December 16, 1947, and renamed Camp Yehoshua after Yehoshua Globerman (1905–1947), who was killed near Latrun while returning from a mission to Jerusalem. It was the first independent Jewish military base in modern history. The base was dubbed HaKirya because it contained the government offices in Tel Aviv, the provisional capital of Israel at the time, until Jerusalem was secured and declared the capital. The Haganah and then Israel Defense Forces also used the Templer buildings as their first headquarters, including the headquarters of the Sherut Avir (later Israeli Air Force) and the Kiryati Brigade. The Givati Brigade was also founded at the base.

=== State of Israel ===
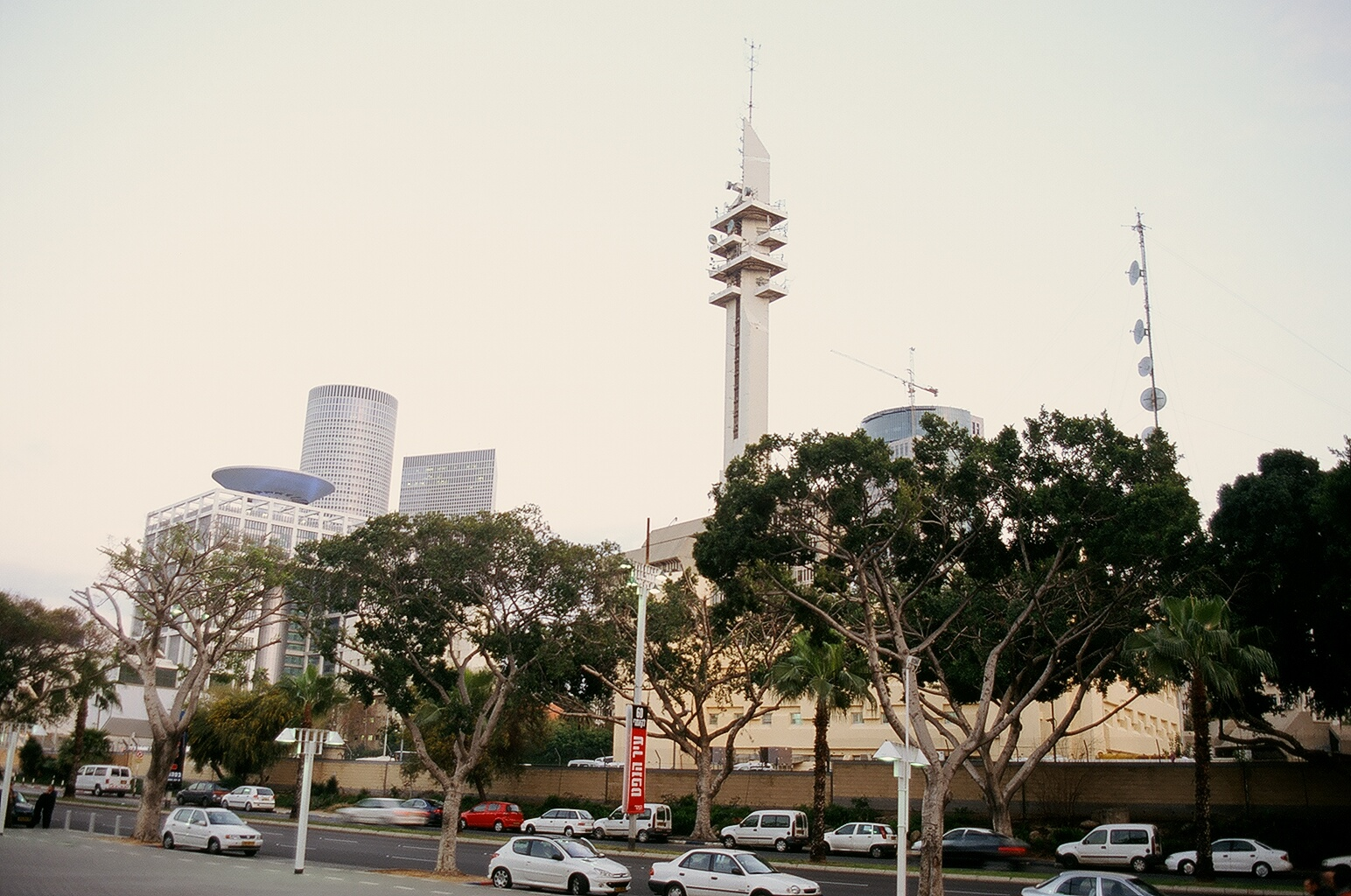
Marganit Tower, an old landmark of the Kirya

Over the years, the military base's land area has been decreasing due to the high land value and sale to private companies. In 2009, Camp Rabin was the base with the largest number of regular soldiers. Many of the civilian government offices once spread over the entire former Sarona colony were concentrated outside the military base in the Kirya Tower, which was completed in 2005 in the southern part of the Kirya.

In 2012, there were reports that the IDF headquarters or parts of it would be moved to Jerusalem, or to the Negev, the Galilee and the city of Lod, while retaining the more recently built IDF facilities of the Kirya.

In 2012, it was speculated that HaKirya could be targeted by enemy GPS-guided missiles, in particular the M-300 missiles installed in Syria.

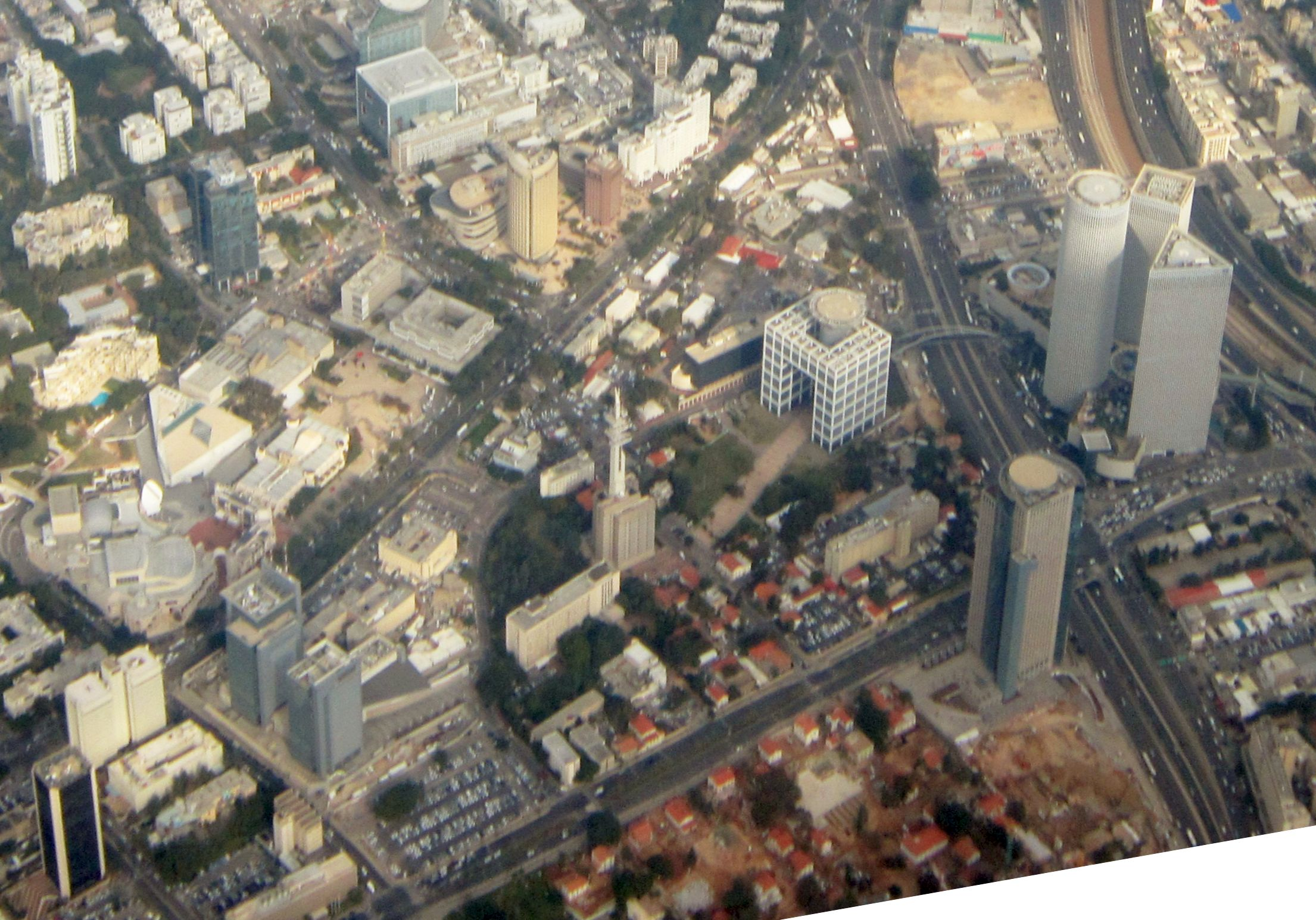
Aerial view of the northern Kirya, Azrieli towers, and Kirya Tower

The Kirya today consists of a northern section, used for the military base, and the southern one, a business district which includes the Kirya Tower. These sections are separated by Kaplan Street. The military base is home to the Matcal Tower and Marganit Tower, and serves as the headquarters of the IDF's General Staff.

There are plans to relocate parts of the northern section (military base), including the dining hall, in favor of the Tel Aviv Light Rail and private development. Plans also exist to build five new towers inside the base, including new structures for the Military Intelligence Directorate and Navy. In August 2013, The Tel Aviv Local Committee approved plans for the Keren HaKirya mixed-use complex, composed of 80 and 50-storey commercial towers, two 45-storey residential towers, on a base consisting of a two-storey retail mall, at the intersection of Menachem Begin and Shaul HaMelech Boulevards.

Hakirya Bridge, a pedestrian bridge above Begin Road, connects the district to the Azrieli Center, a landmark high-rise commercial complex in Tel Aviv located to the east. Another pedestrian bridge connects the Azrieli Center with HaShalom railway station, which is also accessible at street level via Giva'at HaTahmoshet Street/HaShalom Road (an extension of Kaplan Street).

There are two underground stations below Begin St. on the Red Line light rail line, one station nearby Shaul HaMelech and Moses Streets in the north of the district and one near Yehudit St. in the southern part of it.

On 13 June 2025, during the Twelve-Day War, an Iranian missile struck the part of Tel Aviv where the Kirya is located.

On 4 April 2026, during the 2026 Iran war, an Iranian missile struck the part of Tel Aviv where the Kirya is located.
