= The Other Side of Israel =

Non fiction book by Susan Nathan

The other side of Israel is a book written by British-born Israeli writer Susan Nathan.

The author, four years after her migration from Britain to Israel shifts her home from Tel Aviv to Tamra an Arab populated town in Israel where she finds the difference in status between Israeli Jews and Israeli Arabs.
