= Israel Land Authority =

Israeli government agency

The Israel Land Authority (ILA; Hebrew: רשות מקרקעי ישראל, romanized: Rāšut Mĕqarqĕʿē Yiśrāʾēl; Arabic: سلطة أراضي إسرائيل, romanized: Sulṭat ʾArāḍī ʾIsrāʾīl) is a governmental body created as a part of a reform of the Israel Land Administration. It replaced the Israel Land Administration following reforms in 2009.

== History ==
"The Basic Law: Israel Lands" establishes the principle that Israel Lands are nationally owned, and they can only be leased, not sold. Thus, land buyers are granted only lessee's rights, formally not full ownership rights. Based on this law and several other laws, the Israel Land Administration was created in 1960. It is an organization supervising the proper use of lands in the public domain and managing some 93% of Israeli lands.

Starting from the beginning of the 2000s there has been an ongoing debate including governmental officials whether different issues arising from the national ownership of the land can be solved. On July 12, 2003 and on February 4, 2004 the Constitution, Law, and Justice Committee met as the committee for the Constitution by Broad Consensus to discuss this problem.

== Debate ==
Several academic experts have challenged the necessity to keep 93% to 94% of public lands owned by the state, Professor Hanoch Dagan of Tel Aviv University and Professor Rachelle Alterman of Technion - Israel Institute of Technology among them. They noted that the law allows certain exceptions to the prohibition on selling state lands and suggested that there is no need in changing (constitutional) basic laws – these exceptions could be broadened by ordinary legislation.

in 2013, on an Israeli government constitutional law explainer website, arguments by Professor Joshua Weisman of the Hebrew University of Jerusalem were presented, explaining that a lessee's rights are equal to that of the owner. This is because:

1. The leases granted by the Israel Lands Authority are long-term – usually two terms of 49 years.
2. The amount paid for leases is very close to the market price for full ownership.
3. The state does not actually repossess its land when the leases run out.

Weisman also believes that the main principle of the Basic Law: Israel Lands should remain unchanged since it is one of the fundamental features of the Israeli legal system. Weisman also added that Israel is a small country with limited land reserves.

== Land reform ==
Influenced by this debate, in April 2009 Israeli Ministry of Finance has issued a paper offering basic reforms for Israeli economy in 2009-2010. It recommended “to pass the law on the land ownership to let all lessees holding lease contracts for housing and employment (gain full ownership rights).” It was suggested to create a new government agency for this purpose – Israel Land Authority. The reform should start from urban lands, but some parts of this paper also noted the importance of privatizing agricultural lands. Financial experts of the ministry saw Israel Land Administration is the main impediment for the economic development of the state since main economic activities depend upon the flexibility of the land reserves.

These changes were implemented in the Arrangements Law of 2009 including a section called “Israel Lands Reform”. This reform was a part of the privatization process of the ILA and it was heavily criticized by the public.

=== Reform's components ===
1. Granting ownership rights to leaseholders of real estate designated for residence and employment on the urban lands;
2. Comprehensive internal organizational change of the Israel Land Administration and turning it into the Israel Land Authority.

=== Reform's objectives ===
- Reducing the number of bureaucratic impediments and lowering the costs for housing and small business owners - ownership rights granted will reduce the dependence of land owners from the ILA;
- Increasing the stock of land for construction;
- Focusing on reaching ILA's objectives - the reduced number of leaseholders will reduce the number of clients for treatment and it will help concentrate on other important issues;
- Environment protection and the protection of open-spaced territories through the construction densification and maintaining underdeveloped land reserves for the future generations;
- Giving benefit for the middle class and lower - granting ownership rights for free to the leaseholders in the center of the country and also in the periphery;
- Protecting national interests.

== Creation ==
In August 2009, the Knesset passed an Israel Land Authority Law that allows people to own land property in Israel, rather than lease it. According to the law, land privatization will be divided into two steps, with a team of ministers examining the reform. As a part of the same legislature and as a part of the land reform Israeli Land Authority was created.

Under the reform some 200,000 acres of state-owned land, comprising 4% of total Israeli lands, will be sold to private buyers, including homeowners, developers and kibbutzim. It will speed development plans, bring more housing quickly to market and thus help reduce soaring housing prices and boost Israeli economy. Municipalities will gain more power in land allocation and development.

According to the official governmental press-release, "The reforms are designed to reduce bureaucratic impediments for homeowners who wish to enlarge their homes and the involvement of the Government in the real estate market, and enable the ILA to focus on developing and marketing state lands, as opposed to dealing with leased residential units." The reforms are meant to offer a greater supply of residential units that would cause housing prices to decline.

Upon the agreement reached after negotiations were held between ILA management, Ministry of Finance and Trade unions, some 200 of ILA staff will leave their job voluntarily, as for the rest they will be embedded in the structure of a new Israel Land Authority organization.

== Israel Land Authority’s objectives ==
According to the Amendment 7 (2009) of the Israel Land Administration Law (1960), ILA’s objectives are as follows.

- Managing Israeli lands as a resource for development of the State of Israel in the interest of the public, environment and for the future generations, leaving sufficient land reserves for this purpose and for the development of the country in the future, with a proper balance between the needs in conservation for development and the marketing of land to maintain land reserves for public purposes.
- Promoting competition in the land market and preventing concentration of land holdings

== Israel Land Authority’s functions ==
According to the Amendment 7 (2009) of the Israel Land Administration Law (1960), ILA’s functions are as follows.

- Allocation of land for housing, affordable housing, public housing, employment, open space allotments and for other purposes in locations and amounts required for the needs of economy, society and environment, including future needs;
- Land acquisition and land expropriation for the state according to the law, primarily for environmental purposes;
- Protection of rights of land owners in Israel;
- Promotion of registration of real estate rights in the Land books of Israel;
- Provision of services to the landholders in Israel as required for management and implementation of their rights;
- Publication of information about Israeli lands, including details on agreements made by the Authority regarding lands it manages, and data on the availability of planned Israeli lands for development and maintenance of open space territory;
- Any other function related to the Israel land management imposed upon it by law or by any governmental decision.

== Structure ==
Israel Land Authority is headed by ILA's CEO appointed by prime minister and other ministers for a 5-year cadence. The current CEO (starting from September 2011) is Bentzi Lieberman. CEO is subject to Housing and Construction Minister, while ILA's staff are state employees. The Israel Land Council sets policy for the Israel Land Authority.

On January 21, 2013 prime minister Benjamin Netanyahu has appointed former Communications and Welfare Minister Moshe Kahlon as a new ILA chairman.

The structure of the ILA consists of headquarters and three divisions:

- Business division responsible for marketing and real estate operations;
- Land maintenance division for supervision and enforcement of State's right for the land;
- Service division providing services to those engaged in valid contracts with Israel Land Administration.

== Supervision over ILA's activities ==
According to the Amendment 7 (2009) of the Israel Land Administration Law (1960), Israel Land Council will be formed by the government. This Council will shape the land policies of the Israel Land Authority, oversee its activities and approve its proposed budget determined by the law. ILA manager will present a detailed report on the organization's activities to the Israel Land Council twice a year. The government will also present a report to the Economical Affairs Committee of the Knesset at least once a year. Israel Land Council will be headed by the minister and it will have 13 more members chosen by the government, 7 of them from the government and 6 from KKL.

== See also ==
- Israel Land Administration
- Israeli land and property laws
- Jewish National Fund
