= Susan Nathan =

British-born Israeli writer

- סוזן נתן
- Born: England

Susan Nathan (Hebrew: סוזן נתן) is a British-born Israeli writer.

== Biography ==
Nathan was born in England to a Jewish family. Whilst young Nathan visited friends and family in the apartheid-era South Africa where her father was born. There she had several encounters with the social and political situation in that country.

When she returned to London she became an AIDS counselor.

She divorced and, in 1999, once her children had grown-up she immigrated to Israel under the Law of Return, and settled in Tel Aviv, finding work as an English teacher, working with various centre-left organizations.

Nathan formed the view that much of Israel's Arab population were neglected and oppressed. As a result, in 2003 she moved from her home in Tel Aviv to the Arab city of Tamra in northern Israel. There she wrote The Other Side of Israel. In that work Nathan examined the historical, political and cultural currents of the Middle Eastern conflict. She wrote of her Arab neighbors, their challenges and their hopes and the segregation and discrimination she felt they face in Israel. The book has been translated into nine languages, including 2008 Malayalam, the dialect of Kerala in southern India.

Susan Nathan has spoken at The Swedish Human Rights festival, Malmo, 2006, where she was the keynote speaker, giving a speech entitled: "Living equally and unequally within Israel 2006." She has had extensive speaking engagements hosted by the Olof Palme Centre, Stockholm. In 2006, she was sponsored by the Boniuk Centre, Rice University, Houston, as well as the Arab American Association Universities of Indianapolis, dePauw, Indiana State University, the Indianapolis Foreign Affairs Committee, various church organizations in Indianapolis, Franklin College—Indianapolis, San Francisco State University, Stanford, Berkeley, UCLA, and was a guest speaker in Nashville, Tennessee to a large private company, as well as the Institute of International Relations, Monterey, California. She also presented to the Mayors Conference, London 2007, "Bringing Democracy to the Middle East".

Nathan writes extensively for the Swedish press, Aftonbladet, covering issues inside Israel. She is active in the promotion of UN Resolution 1325 that promotes the role of women in peacemaking. She has been the guest of the Edinburgh and Antwerp book festivals where her book has been one of the best sellers.

Nathan has given countless interviews and has been featured in several documentaries: April 2007, she was the subject of a BBC One documentary, "Aliyah--the return home." April 2007, she was filmed for an Italian documentary based on the "Tree of Life" mosaic, Otranto cathedral, Otranto, southern Italy. In the summer of 2007, she was the subject of an Israeli channel 2 programme which examined the lives of Israelis from different backgrounds.

Nathan gave a speaking tour in the United States in the fall of 2008.

In 2010, she came to live in Kozhikode, Kerala. The Malayalam version of her book 'The Other Side of Israel' was published by Other Books, a publishing house in Kozhikode run by Auswaf Ahsan. Nathan has also published pro-Palestine articles in 'Tejas' the mouthpiece of Popular Front of India and Mathrubhumi. In 2012 she was deported to Israel for overstaying her visa, despite a pending Supreme Court appeal.

== Publications ==
- The other side of Israel: my journey across the Jewish-Arab divide. New York/N.Y: Doubleday. 2005. ISBN 978-0-385-51456-9.
