= Tamborera =

- Stylistic origins: Panamanian Tamborito and Cuban Danzón
- Cultural origins: Panamanian and Cuban Folk Music
- Typical instruments: Pujador, Repicador, Caja, tambora, furro, charrasca, maracas, trumpet, trombone, guitar, piano, voice

Regional scenes
- Panama Venezuela Colombia Puerto Rico

Other topics
- Salsa music - Cuban son

Tamborera is a genre of Panamanian folk music. It is a mixture of Panamanian Tamborito and Cuban Danzón, created by the musician Ricardo Fabrega during the first half of the twentieth century.

== History of the Tamborera ==
The Tamborera was created by Ricardo Fabrega in the first half of the 20th century, to exalt nationalism and identify the Panamanians with their traditions.

This is recognized by journalist Ignacio Nacho Valdes, who said: "His compositions, of a deep romantic content, have the purpose of exalt the national soul of Panamanians, and therefore, through generations, our people have sung his songs sometimes with joy and often with a deep melancholy. "His music traveled to all corners of the country and internationally and has been the enjoyment of all classes

The Tamborera became known throughout Latin America with the famous song "Guararé" that is today part of the classics of Latin American music, with "Santiagueñita", "Chiricanita", "Agüita de canela", "Mi negro", "El filo", "Chichaco por los aires" and " Tan Bella y Presumida"

The genre gave life to real stars. Among these the most famous was Silvia De Grasse who brought her career to developing gender cusp outside the Panamanian border, especially in Puerto Rico, where she was recognized by the Puerto Rican television for her talent.

== Instrumentation ==
Tamborera uses a mix of several traditional Panamanian drums: the Repicador, the Pujador, and the Caja. Organ, piano, electric guitar, trumpet, bass guitar and other drums, which are not typically found in Panamanian music, are also used.

== Some Panamanian artists of Tamborera music ==
- Lucho Azcarraga
- Silvia De Grasse
- Avelino Muñoz Barrios
- Chavelita Pinzón

== Introduction to Venezuela ==
The Panamanian Tamborera was introduced to Venezuela in the early 1970s, by the famous Gaitas singer Nelson Martinez with the group Gran Coquivacoa. His rhythm is 2x4 as the Panamanian tamborito, and was initially played with cuatro, furro, tambora, charrasca and maracas. Soon were added bass, piano, electric guitar, congas, bongos, cowbell and even brass (trumpet, trombone and saxophone) and drums. Since the late 70s and early 80s Gaitas Tamborera was influenced by Caribbean music, especially the Salsa.

=== Instrumentation ===
The most important instruments in tamborera music are the percussion, which consist of several characteristic instruments: tamboras, furro, charrasca, and maracas.

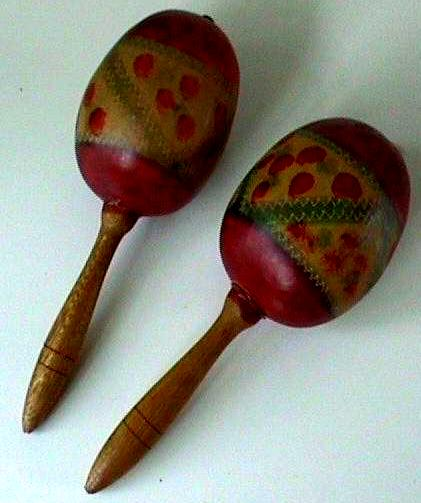
Maracas

Apart from percussion, other core instruments are the guitar and piano. Depending on the performing artist, other melodic instruments, such as the trumpets and trombones can be used as accompaniment as well. Tamborera music typically features a vocalist as well.

=== Lyricism ===
Tamborera lyrics are structured to include three verses and a chorus, with each line made up of eight syllables. Initially written about the daily life of people in nature, tamborera lyrics now range from simple phrases and words, like "tamborera" repeated with little creativity, to romantic love songs, to radical verses of protest.

=== Rhythm ===
Because of the tropical Caribbean undertones of the tamborera, this genre is musically different from its ancestral gaita de tambora or other gaitas. Tamborera music generally utilizes a 2/4 or 4/4 time signature, but this is prone to waver with great usage of syncopation. The four percussion instruments (tamboras, furro, charrasca, maracas) layer several different rhythmic patterns together at the same time, but it is always the tamboras that lay down the foundation of the tamborera by providing the main beat.

=== Some Venezuelan artists of Tamborera music ===
- Jose Luis Moran
- Rozenda Bernal
- Gran Coquivacoa is a Venezuelan Gaita Zuliana group that released numerous albums featuring the tamborera as well as the gaita de tambora.
- Guaco, initially a gaita band from Maracaibo, added a more tropical Afro-Cuban vibe to the tamborera. The group soon merged other genres like pop, jazz, and funk to create a completely novel face to the genre.

== Notes ==
- Blood, B. "Gaita". Dolmetsch Online Music Dictionary. 2008.
- "Folklore in Colombia" 2007.
- Giménez, Carlos. "The African Components of the Folk Music of Venezuela: A Conversation with Jesús "Chucho"García – Part II". Clave Magazine Vol. II. No. 3. July–August, 1999
- "La Gaita Origen intrumentos y Tipos". September 17, 2007. Jelsoft Enterprises Ltd.
- "Music" Venezuelan Music Project. 2008.
- Ramos Guédez, José Marcial (2001). Contribución a la história de las culturas negras en Venezuela colonial. Instituto Municipal de Publicaciones-Alcaldía de Caracas. ISBN 9800776567.
- Velasquez, Antonio. "The tamborera, a genre into oblivion". December 15, 2007.
