= Azrieli Group =

Israeli real estate company

Azrieli Group Ltd.
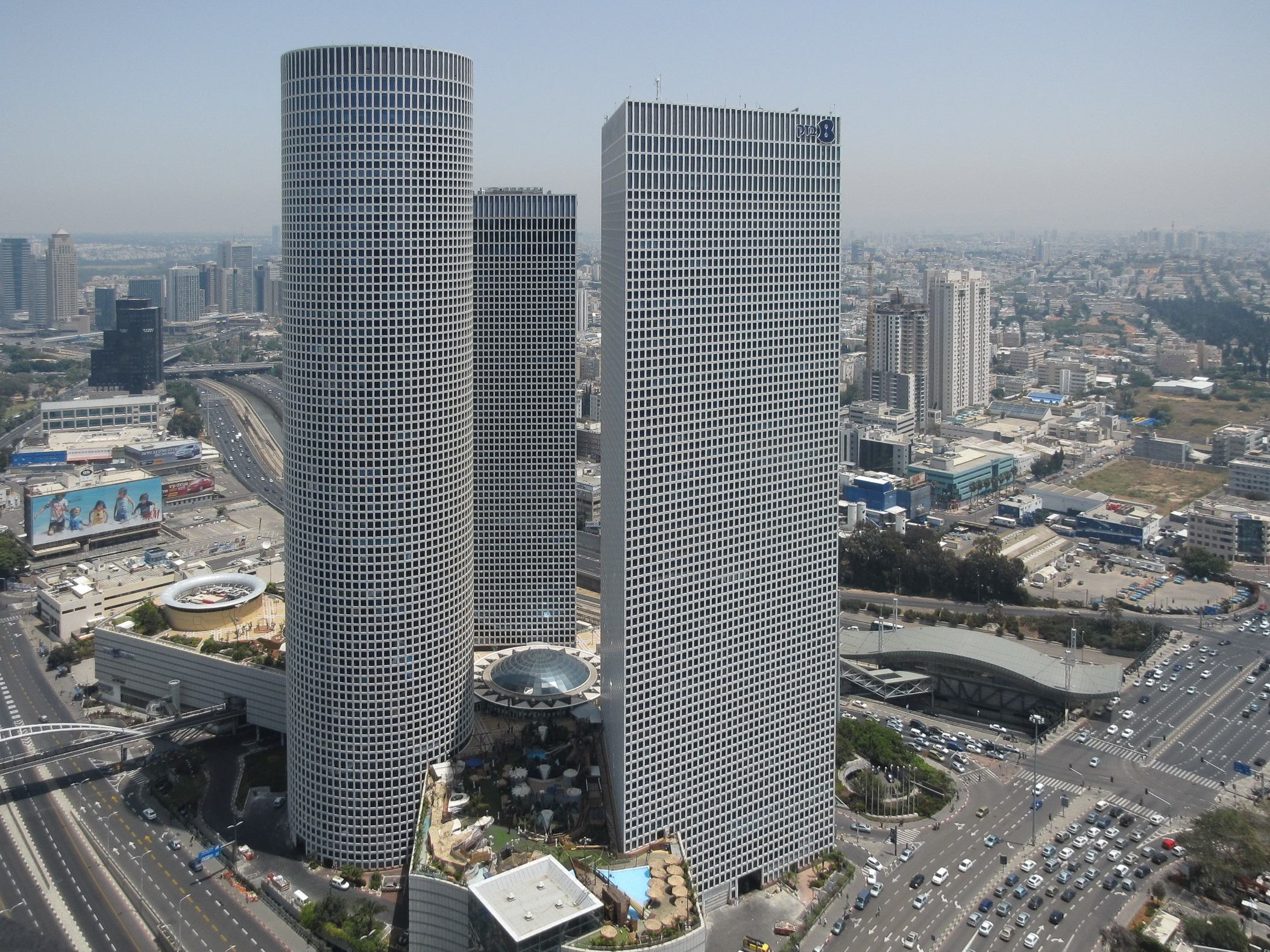
- Azrieli Center
- Type: Public
- Traded as: TASE: AZRG; TA-35 Index Component
- Industry: Real estate, financial services
- Founded: 1982; 44 years ago
- Headquarters: Tel Aviv, Israel
- Key people: Danna Azrieli (CEO)
- Website: www.azrieli.com

Azrieli Group (Hebrew: קבוצת עזריאלי) is an Israeli real estate and holding company named after its founder David Azrieli, who also founded the Azrieli Foundation. The company is engaged mainly in the development and management of shopping malls and office buildings in Israel.

The Azrieli Group has total assets of NIS 60.7 billion. They are responsible for the Azrieli Jerusalem Mall and Azrieli Ayalon Mall.

The company is traded in the Tel Aviv Stock Exchange under the symbol AZRG, and is part of the Tel Aviv 35 Index.

== History ==
=== Founding and early years ===
Azrieli Group started its activities in 1982, developing the Ayalon Mall in Ramat Gan, which opened in July 1985.

Azrieli Group opened its second mall, Hanegev Mall, in Beersheva in 1989. The opened a third mall, the Jerusalem Mall, in 1993.

Between 1996 and 2007, the group developed the Azrieli Center in Tel Aviv, a complex that includes three office buildings above a shopping mall.

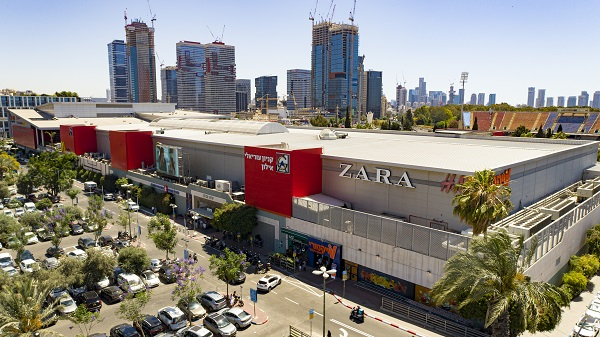
Azrieli Ayalon, a shopping mall built by and owned by the group

By 2005, Azrieli Group was considered Israel's largest real estate investment group. The company went public on the Tel Aviv Stock Exchange in 2010. It built or purchased a series of shopping malls in the late 2000s and early 2010s, including locations in Modi'in, Hod HaSharon, Givatayim, Haifa, Akko and Ramla.

Danna Azrieli succeeded her father as chair of Azrieli Group in 2014. The company entered the senior housing market that year with the purchase of land in Modi'in to build an approximately 400-unit assisted living and nursing home facility. That same year, the company sold paint manufacturer Tambour to the Kusto Group. By 2016, the company had five senior housing projects throughout Israel. It purchased e-commerce platform buy2 in 2016 for NIS 62 million, renaming the site Azrieli.com. The platform shut down in 2023 following losses of NIS 313 million since its purchase. In 2017, the company completed Azrieli Sarona Tower, at the time the tallest building in Israel, and construction on a mall in Rishon LeZion. Azrieli Group operated 16 malls in 2017.

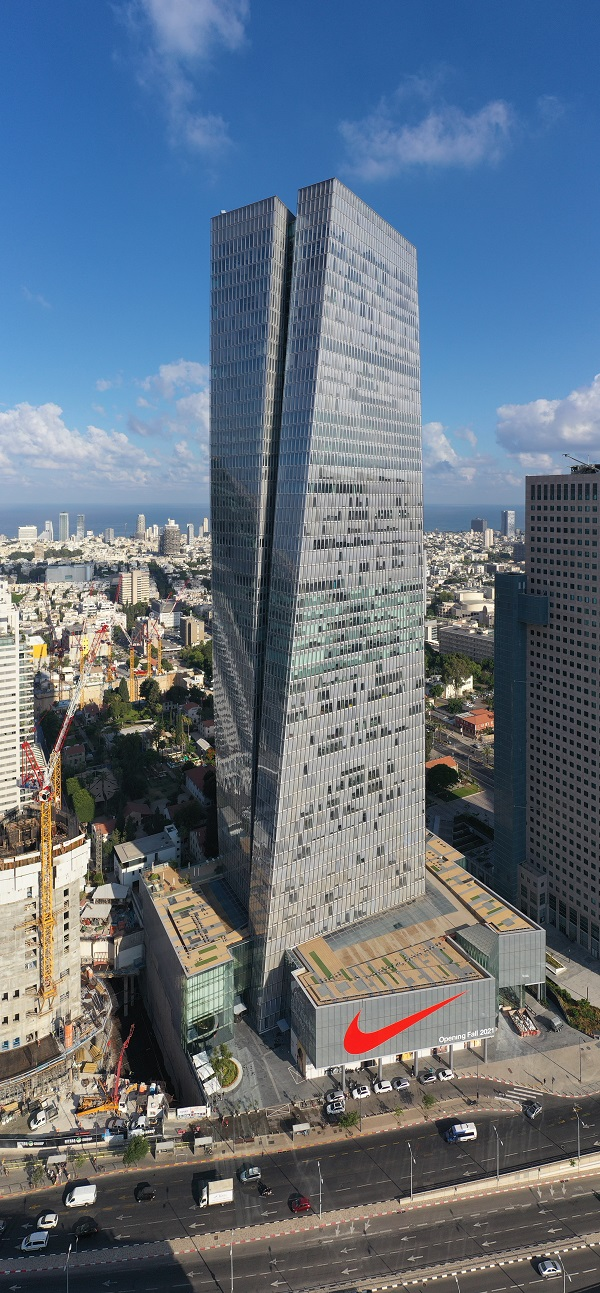
Azrieli Sarona tower and mall

In July 2019, Azrieli acquired 20% of US-based Compass Holdco to compete in the data center real estate business. In 2021, Azrieli acquired Green Mountain, AS for ₪2.8 Billion.

In January 2022, permission was given by the Tel Aviv local planning and building committee to build the Spiral Tower at the Azrieli Center, which will be a 350 m (1,150 ft) tall, 91-storey building and would become the second-tallest structure in Israel.

In 2025, Azrieli Group bought developer ZMH Hammerman, which is part of a list of companies operating in West Bank settlements. The UN Human Rights Council noted that the companies flagged by the list were all responsible for activities that “raised particular human rights concerns”.

In recent years, the Azrieli Group and its ties to the Azrieli Foundation have been the target of campaigns by artists and activists in Canada due to its connections with activity in alleged illegal settlements in the occupied West Bank and other concerns.

=== Diversification ===
By 2020, Azrieli Group had shifted its focus from shopping centers and increased its investment in senior housing, data centers, and office buildings.

In 2022, the company completed the 36-floor Azrieli Town Tower, and in 2022, purchased a mall in Eilat for NIS 1.31 billion.

In March 2023, Green Mountain and TikTok entered a NIS 2.8 billion deal for the former to build the latter a data center in Norway. Azrieli Group sold its stake in Compass in June 2023 for NIS 3.2 billion. The same year, it entered agreements to build data centers in Norway and Frankfurt, Germany. As of 2026, data centers made up a fifth of the company’s revenue.

Construction of The Spiral Tower, a skyscraper planned to become Israel's tallest, began in 2018. It is the fourth tower in the Azrieli Center complex, and its construction is scheduled for completion in 2028.

== Properties ==
Name	Built/acquired	Location
Ayalon Mall	1985	Ramat Gan
Negev Mall	1990	Beersheba
Malha Mall	1993	Jerusalem
Azrieli Circle Tower	1999	Tel Aviv
Azrieli Triangle Tower	1999	Tel Aviv
Azrieli Square Tower	2007	Tel Aviv
Modi'in Mall	2008	Modi'in
Azrieli Hod HaSharon Mall	2008	Hod HaSharon
Givatayim Mall	2009	Givatayim
Haifa Mall	2010	Haifa
Azrieli Akko Mall	2011	Akko
Ramla Mall	2015	Ramla
Azrieli Sarona Tower	2017	Tel Aviv
Azrieli Rishonim	2017	Rishon LeZion
Azrieli Town Tower	2021	Tel Aviv
Mall Hayam Eilat	2022	Eilat
The Spiral Tower	2028	Tel Aviv

== See also ==
- Economy of Israel
