= La Grey Zuliana =

"La grey zuliana" is a well-known Venezuelan gaita, and is regarded by some as the "Anthem of the Gaiteros" (Venezuelan gaita musicians). It was composed by Ricardo Aguirre, and was first recorded in 1968 by its author with the group Saladillo.

The lyrics to the song are as follows:

En todo tiempo cuando a la calle sales, mi reina,

tu pueblo amado se ha confundido en un solo amor,

amor inmenso, glorioso, excelso, sublime y tierno,

amor celeste, divino y santo hacia tu bondad.

Madre mía, si el gobierno

no ayuda al pueblo zuliano,

tendréis que meter la mano

y mandarlo pa'l infierno. (Bis)

[Chorus]:

La grey zuliana, cual rosario popular

de rodillas va a implorar a su patrona,

y una montaña de oraciones quiere dar

esta gaita magistral que el saladillo la entona. (Bis)

Tu pueblo te pide ahora

madre mía, lo ayudéis

y que fortuna le deis,

con mucho amor te lo implora. (Bis)

Chorus

Acabaron con la plata

y se echaron a reír,

pero les puede salir

el tiro por la culata. (Bis)

Chorus

Maracaibo ha dando tanto

que debiera de tener

carreteras a granel

con morocotas de canto. (Bis)

Chorus

== See also ==
- Gaita zuliana
- Music of Venezuela
