= Tamburello (surname) =

Tamburello is an Italian surname. Notable people with the surname include:

- Ben Tamburello (born 1964), American football guard and center
- Daniel Tamburello, American politician in New Hampshire
- Paolo Tamburello, Canadian politician

== Fictional characters ==
- Chris Tamburello, fictional character of the MTV's reality television series The Real World: Paris

== See also ==
- Tamburelli, people with this surname
- Tamburi (surname)
