= Azrieli Sarona Tower =

Skyscraper in Tel Aviv, Israel

- מגדל עזריאלי שרונה
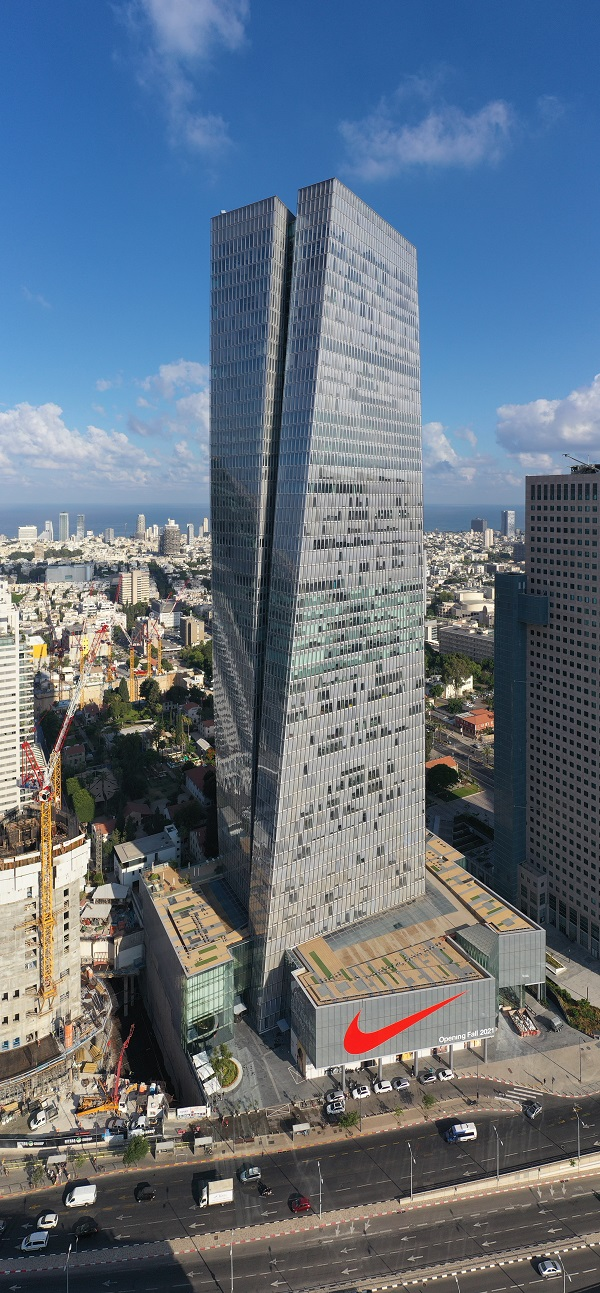
- The tower in October 2017
- Interactive map of the Azrieli Sarona Tower area

General information
- Status: Completed
- Type: Office, Commercial, Hotel
- Location: Tel Aviv, Israel
- Coordinates: 32°04′19″N 34°47′19″E
- Construction started: 2013
- Completed: 2017
- Opening: 2017
- Cost: ILS ₪ 1.5 billion

Height
- Roof: 238.5 m (782 ft)

Technical details
- Floor count: 61

Design and construction
- Architects: Moshe Tzur Architects and Town Planners
- Developer: Azrieli Group

Website
- www.barnes-israel-sarona.com

The Azrieli Sarona Tower is a skyscraper in the Sarona neighborhood, Tel Aviv, Israel, on Begin Road. It is 238.5 metres (782 ft) high with 61 floors. It is the third tallest building in Israel.

== History ==
In May 2011, the Azrieli Group acquired the land plot for ILS ₪ 522 million via tender from the Israel Land Administration. The plot's size is 9.4 dunam and had a plan for a 180 metres (590 ft) high office building with a volume of 82,710 square metres (890,300 sq ft) for office use and 6,700 square metres (72,000 sq ft) for commercial use. In 2012, the Azrieli Group appealed the Regional Committee for Planning and Construction of the Tel Aviv District, asking to transfer 3,300 square metres (36,000 sq ft) to increase the area for commercial use. The committee accepted the request, but demanded that an eighth garage floor will be built. Due to the expected high price (₪70 million) and the increased construction time, a compromise was achieved and instead of an eighth garage floor, 500 of the parking spots were agreed to be designated for public use such that the residents of Tel Aviv would not pay more than the price charged at municipal parking stations owned by the city of Tel Aviv. The seven-story underground garage has a total of 1,600 parking spots, and the commercial center is spread over the first three floors. On the 33rd to 37th floors, there is a plan for a hotel to be built.

In 2013, the Regional Committee for Planning and Construction of the Tel Aviv District authorized the construction of a building 255 metres (837 ft) above sea level (i.e. 238.5 metres (782 ft) above ground level).

In 2015, the Azrieli Group signed an agreement with Africa-Israel Investments, owned by Jewish billionaire and philanthropist Lev Avnerovich Leviev, leasing the floors from the 33rd to the 37th for a period of 20 years for the establishment of a hotel. The hotel will have 160 rooms and will be separate from the business offices, with separate elevators, a separate lobby, a restaurant, and a lounge. Africa-Israel Investments paid 250 million new Israeli shekels (NIS) and will invest another 50 million shekels in the construction of the new building.

The cornerstone was placed by David Azrieli in a ceremony on 12 March 2012. In June 2016, 60% of the tower was already leased.

== Gallery ==
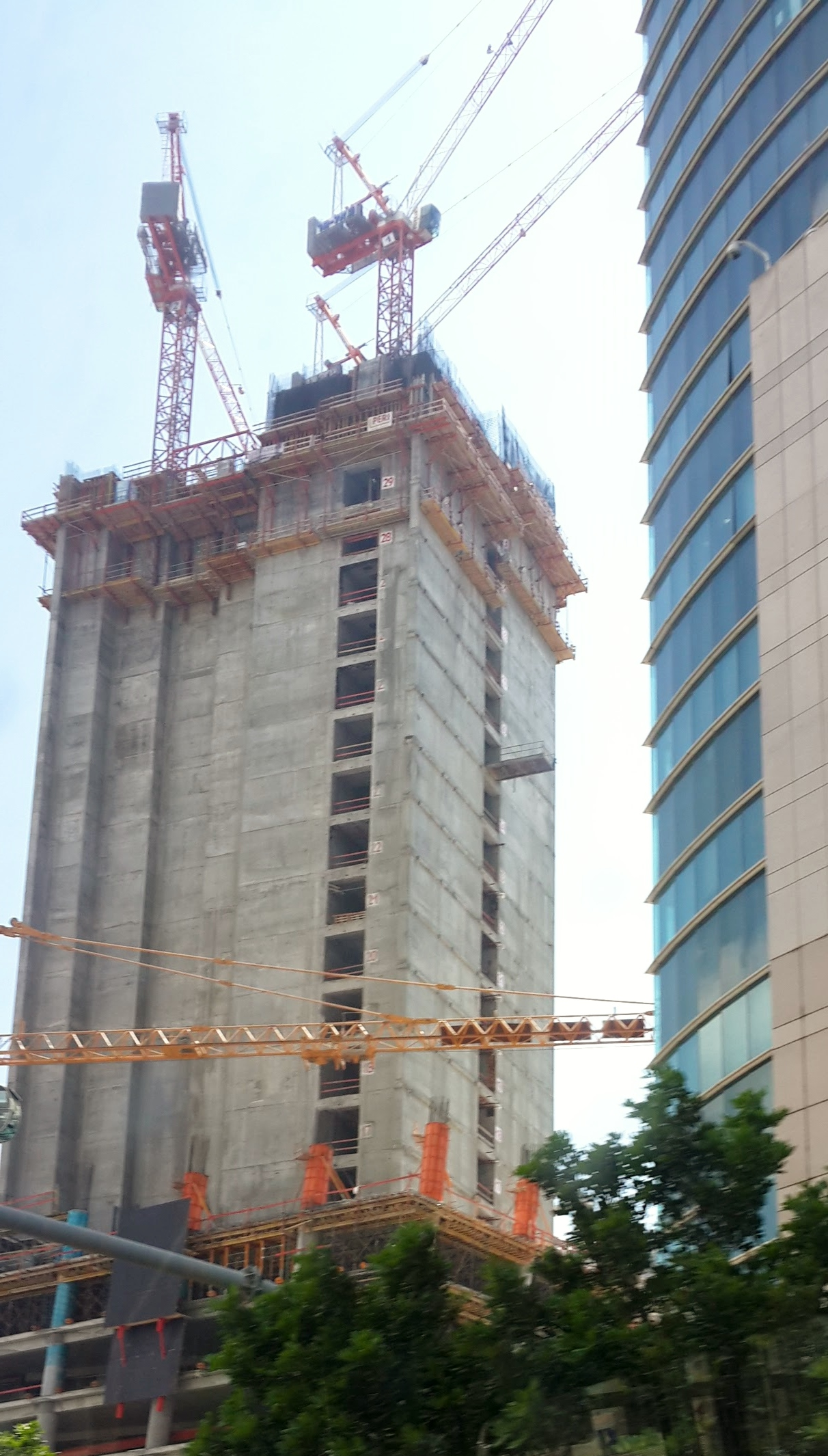
The building in June 2015

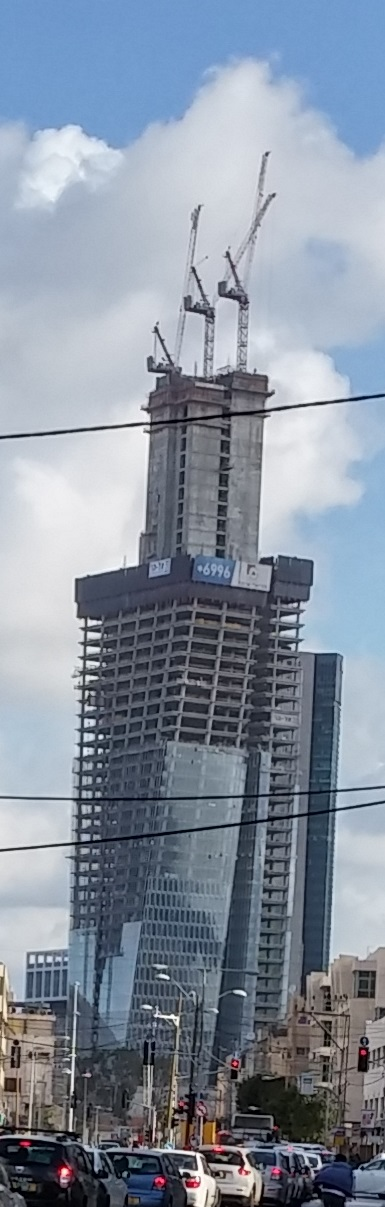
March 2016

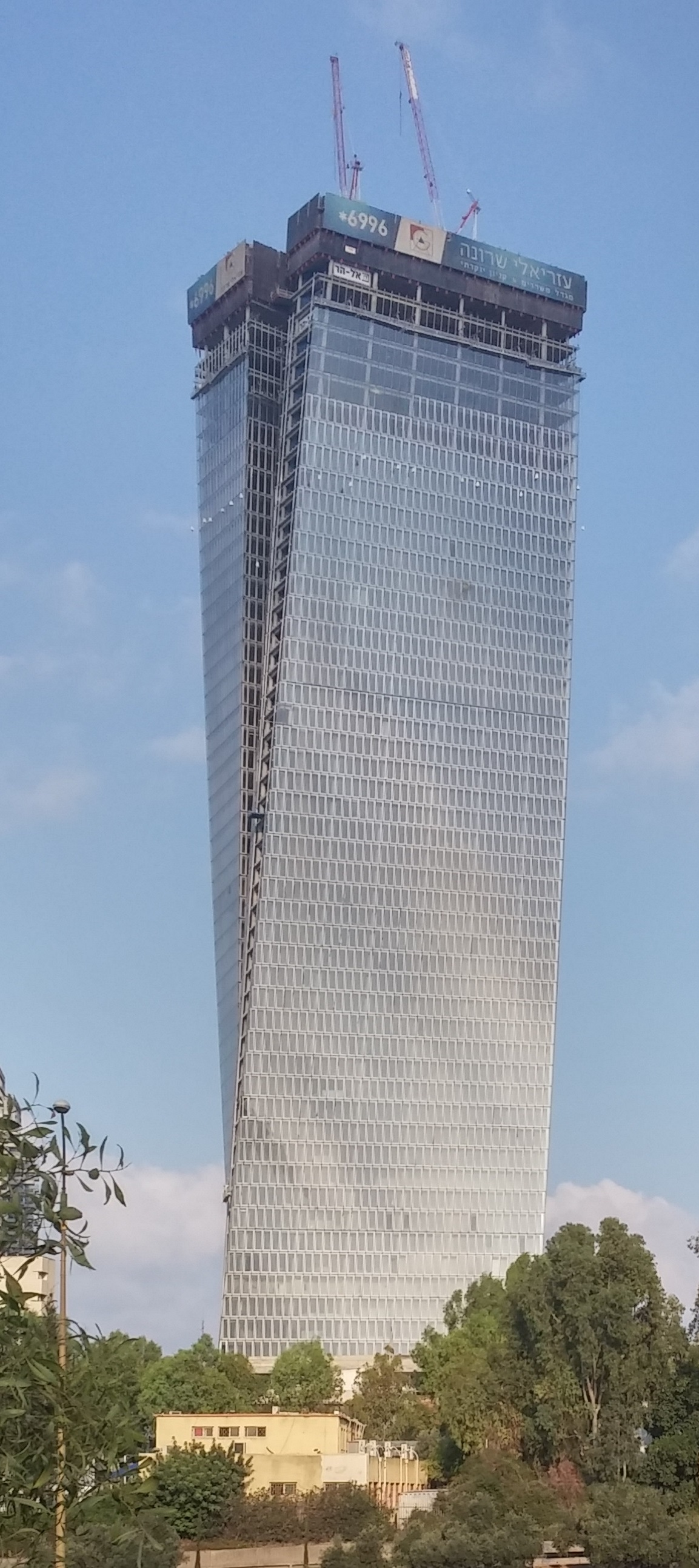
September 2016

== See also ==
- Azrieli Center
- List of tallest buildings in Tel Aviv
- List of tallest buildings in Israel
- Media related to Azrieli Sarona Tower at Wikimedia Commons

Records
Preceded by Moshe Aviv Tower	Tallest building in Israel; 2017–2024; 238 metres (781 ft)	Succeeded by Beyond Office Tower
