= Pinzón (surname) =

Pinzón is a surname. Notable persons with that surname include:

- Pinzón brothers, Spanish navigators who accompanied Christopher Columbus.
  - Martín Alonso Pinzón (c. 1441 – c. 1493), Captain of the Pinta on Columbus's first voyage
  - Francisco Martín Pinzón (c. 1445 – c. 1502), Master of the Pinta on Columbus's first voyage
  - Vicente Yáñez Pinzón (c. 1462 – c. 1514), Captain of the Niña on the first voyage of discovery
- Chavelita Pinzón, Panamanian folklorist and singer
- Daniel Chanis Pinzón, former president of Panama
- Pedro Miguel González Pinzón, Panamanian politician who as of September 2007 is president of the National Assembly of Panama

== See also ==
- Pinzon (disambiguation)
