= Ricardo Aguirre =

Background information
- Also known as: El Monumental
- Born: May 9, 1939; Maracaibo, Venezuela
- Died: November 8, 1969 (aged 30) Maracaibo, Venezuela
- Genres: Gaita zuliana
- Occupations: Musician, singer, composer, director
- Years active: 1958–1969

Ricardo José Aguirre González (May 9, 1939 – November 8, 1969) was a Venezuelan folk musician and Gaita Zuliana singer and composer. He is known as "El Monumental de la Gaita" (The Monumental Artist of the Gaita genre) and "El Padre de la Gaita" (The Father of the Gaita genre). He composed the popular song, "La grey zuliana".

== Biography ==
=== Early life ===
Ricardo Aguirre was born on May 9, 1939, to Luisángel Aguirre and Ida Cira González. He began his elementary education at a small private school before continuing his education at two different public schools. His secondary education was interrupted by the political turmoil caused by the mounting popular pressure against the dictatorship of Marcos Pérez Jiménez. After the dictatorship ended in 1958, Aguirre moved to the town of Rubio in the border state of Táchira where he attended Gervasio Rubio High School. After obtaining a teaching degree at age 19, he began teaching at the Monseñor Francisco A. Granadillo School while serving as an announcer for the radio station La Voz de la Fe.

=== Musical career ===
While studying to become a teacher, he learned to play guitar, piano, and other instruments, and began composing Gaita zuliana songs. During this time, he was a member of different musical groups and performed in musicals and theatrical plays. He began his musical career as the director of the Gaita Zuliana groups Los Sabrosos and Santa Canoíta.

In 1962, he joined Los Cardenales along with his three brothers: Alves, Rixio and Renato. After a division within the group, Aguirre proposed an addition to the group's name and the suggestion was accepted, consequently naming the group Los Cardenales del Éxito (the name the group still uses today).

In 1967, due to differences among members, Aguirre left and joined the group Saladillo, where he composed the song, "La grey zuliana". Aguirre stayed and recorded with the group for two years before returning to Los Cardenales del Éxito to record another album.

=== Death ===
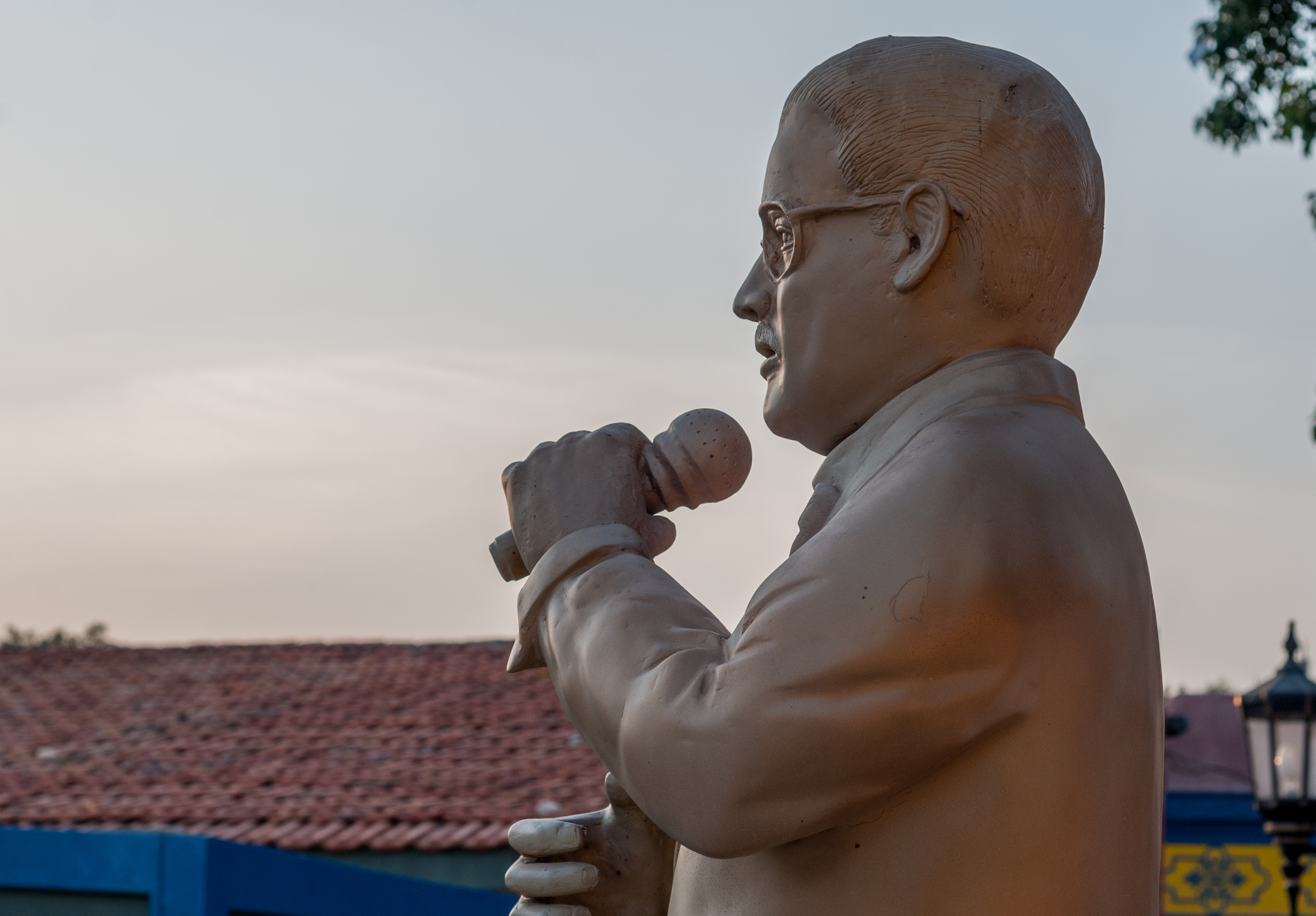
Statue in honor of Ricardo Aguirre in Maracaibo

Aguirre's musical career ended abruptly on November 8, 1969, when he was killed in a vehicular accident in Maracaibo. On November 4, 1978, the then-Governor of Zulia State, Humberto Fernández Auvert, issued a decree officially declaring November 8, "El Día de los Gaiteros" in Aguirre's memory. He had four children who later formed the group Dinastía Aguirre.

=== Origin of his artistic name ===
Aguirre's friend, Octavio Urdaneta, once called Aguirre, "El Monumental" without giving the idea much thought. However, Aguirre's powerful voice, simple personality, and elegant demeanor justified the moniker, and he has been fondly remembered and revered as, "El Monumental" ever since.

== See also ==
- Gaita zuliana
- Music of Venezuela
