= Tambour (disambiguation) =

Tambour (French language: drum, from Arabic tunbur "lute, drum", Persian tabir "drum") can refer to:

== In music ==
- Tambour, a long drum used in Puerto Rican music
- Tambour, a snare drum used in Galician music
- Tambour (guitar technique) (or tambora), in Flamenco and classical guitar

== Other uses ==
- Tambour (architecture), several architectural meanings
- Tambour desk, a desk with desktop drawers and pigeonholes, covered by tambour slatted shutters
- Tambour lace, a sewing technique made by stretching a fine net over a frame
- Tambour (company), an Israeli manufacturer of paint, coatings, and construction materials
- Tambour, a buttress-like feature on the hazard side of a real tennis court
- Tholobate, also known as a tambour, a support for a dome

== See also ==
- Tambourine
- Tabor (instrument)
- Tambor (disambiguation)
- Tambora (disambiguation)
