= Tambora =

Tambora may refer to:

== Music ==
- Tambora (drum), different types of percussion instruments
- Tambour (guitar technique) can also be spelled tambora

== Geography ==
- Mount Tambora, a volcano on the Indonesian island of Sumbawa
  - The 1815 eruption of Mount Tambora
  - Tambora culture, a village and associated culture on Sumbawa, destroyed by the 1815 eruption
  - Tambora language, the associated language
- Tambora, Jakarta, a subdistrict of West Jakarta
- Tumbura, a town in South Sudan

== See also ==
- Tambour (disambiguation)
- Tambura (disambiguation)
- Tambourine (disambiguation)
- Tanpura, also called as Tambora, an instrument used in Indian classical music for continuous production of consonating reference notes (tonic)
