= Falkland Palace Royal Tennis Club =

Tennis club in Falkland Palace, Fife, Scotland

Coordinates: 56°15′19″N 3°12′21″W

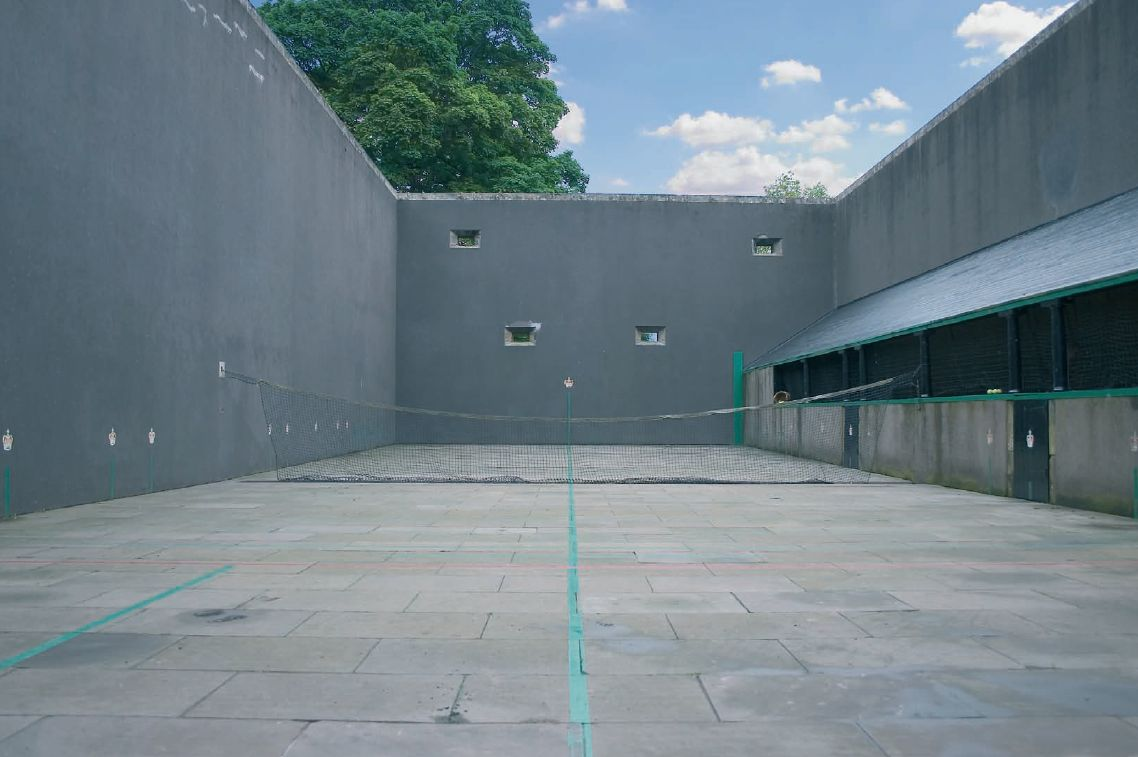
Receiver's view of the court

The Falkland Palace Royal Tennis Club (also previously called the Falkland Palace Real Tennis Club) organizes play at the real tennis court in the gardens of Falkland Palace, Fife, Scotland.

Built for James V of Scotland, court construction began in April 1539 and ended in late 1541. It is the oldest tennis court in use today, though not continuously used since 1541. The court differs from other real tennis courts in two respects. It is the only active real tennis court without a roof (one on Lambay Island requires restoration). Secondly, it is the only surviving example of jeu quarré design, other courts being the jeu à dedans type. The Falkland Palace court is larger than a lawn tennis court, and has four walls. Two of those walls feature penthouses, and unlike jeu à dedans courts lacks a tambour and dedans. It has five additional point-scoring features: four openings (lunes) in one wall and a vertical board (ais). The playing floor is 97 feet 4 inches (29.67 m) by 33 feet 5 inches (10.19 m).

Today's club was formed in 1975. In 1989 the club celebrated the court's 450th anniversary with a tournament, for which a temporary roof was constructed. It did not rain that week. The club also published a book, The Royal Game. Currently, it is Scotland's only real tennis club, although there is a court in Troon in a state of disrepair.
