= Tamburelli =

Tamburelli is an Italian surname. Notable people with the surname include:

- Felice Tamburelli (died 1656), Italian Roman Catholic bishop
- Giacomo Tamburelli (died 2025), Panamanian businessman
- Pier Paolo Tamburelli (born 1976), Italian architect, architectural critic and university professor

== See also ==
- Tambourelli, a court game from Scotland
- Tamburello (surname), people with this name
