= The Spiral Tower =

Skyscraper in Tel Aviv, Israel

General information
- Status: Under construction
- Type: Skyscraper
- Location: Azrieli Center, Tel Aviv, Israel
- Cost: 3.3 billion NIS (approximately $1.075 billion)
- Owner: Azrieli Group

Height
- Height: 350 m (1,150 ft)

Technical details
- Floor count: 91

Design and construction
- Architects: Moshe Tzur, Kohn Pedersen Fox (KPF)

Other information
- Facilities: Shopping Mall, Offices, Hotel, Restaurant and 360-degree Observation Deck.

Website
- https://azrieligroup.com/properties/the-spiral-tower/

The Spiral Tower is a planned 91-story skyscraper, set to reach a height of approximately 350 metres (1,150 ft). It will be located at the Azrieli Center in Tel Aviv, Israel, and is slated to become the tallest building in the country.

The skyscraper will integrate a shopping mall, offices, hotel, Restaurant and 360-degree Observation deck.

Construction costs are estimated at approximately 3.3 billion NIS (approximately $1.075 billion).

== Planning ==
In May 2013, the Azrieli Group acquired the building housing the Israeli newspaper Yedioth Ahronoth, intending to demolish it and construct a 91-story skyscraper in its place, reaching a height of about 350 meters and expected to be the tallest building in Israel.

The skyscraper will feature a shopping mall, offices and hotel - a concept previously unseen in Israel. The top two floors will house a restaurant and a 360-degree observation deck.

In the original design, the tower was intended to include several floors of luxury apartments. However, during the skyscraper's construction in October 2026, it was decided to scrap the idea entirely and convert all the residential floors into additional office space.

== Design ==
The Spiral Tower (Under Construction)

The skyscraper was designed by Israeli architect Moshe Tzur and the international architectural firm Kohn Pedersen Fox (KPF). The design also draws inspiration from ancient biblical Hebrew scrolls and the way they unfurl upwards. It is intended to be the world's first building constructed entirely from 100% recycled aluminum and steel, with the aim of environmental preservation.

The spiral design aims to increase building stability by creating wind resistance. The spiral is made of glass, to increase the amount exposure to sunlight. The glass has anti-glare and temperature regulating features, the glass panels of the Spiral frame reduce overheating and overall energy consumption.

The building provides green space within the spiral design throughout the tower, including a rooftop garden.

To reduce water consumption, the building has a mechanism to collect rain water and use it for sanitary and irrigation purposes within the building. The building will further reduce water consumption by treating used water and reusing the same water for potable purposes. This mechanism is designed to create a minimal overall impact on the environment.

== Construction ==
Construction began in 2018 and is scheduled for completion in 2028.
