= Azrieli Center =

Skyscraper and mall complex in Tel Aviv

- מרכז עזריאלי
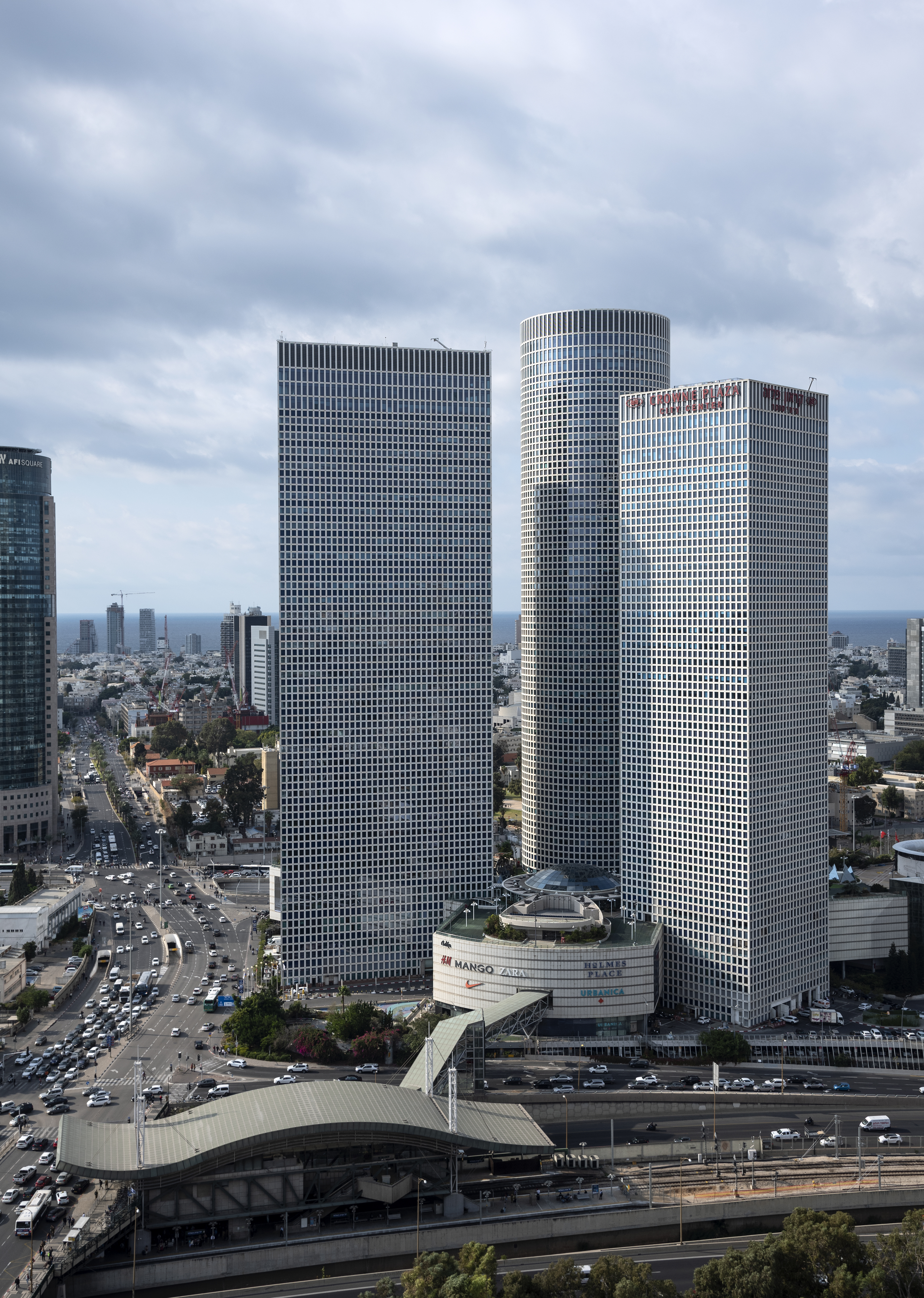
- The Azrieli Center from above in 2019 with Tel Aviv in the background

General information
- Status: Completed
- Type: Mixed-use: Office, Residential, Hotel, Commercial, Public Space
- Architectural style: Postmodern
- Location: 132 Begin Road, Tel Aviv, Israel
- Coordinates: 32.07462°N 34.79187°E
- Construction started: 1994
- Completed: 1999 (Quadratic Towers); 2007 (Spiral Tower); 2026 (Spiral Tower)
- Opening: 1998
- Cost: US$420 million

Height
- Roof: Circular: 187 m (614 ft); Triangle: 169 m (554 ft); Square: 154 m (505 ft)

Technical details
- Floor count: Circular: 49; Triangle: 46; Square: 42
- Floor area: 150,000 m^{2} (1,600,000 sq ft)

Design and construction
- Architects: Eli Attia, Moore Yaski Sivan Architects
- Developer: David Azrieli
- Main contractor: Cementkol

Azrieli Center (Hebrew: מֶרְכָּז עַזְרִיאֵלִי; Merkaz Azrieli) is a complex of three skyscrapers in Tel Aviv. At the base of the complex lies a large shopping mall. The complex was designed by Israeli-American architect Eli Attia. After Attia and the developer of the complex David Azrieli (after whom it is named) fell out, completion of the project was passed on to the Tel Aviv firm of Moore Yaski Sivan Architects.

The construction of two of the three towers and the mall was completed in late 1999 and the third tower was completed in late 2007. The towers are located in central Tel Aviv between Begin Road to the west and Ayalon Highway to the east. A fourth spiral-shaped tower located at the opposite end of the mall is under construction.

The plan shapes of the towers are a circle, a triangle, and a square, with all three towers being shaped as a cylinder, a triangular prism, and a square box. These shapes make up the Azrieli Center logo. Two pedestrian bridges lead to the Azrieli Center – one connects it to the Tel Aviv Hashalom train station to the east of it, and the other, known as the Azrieli Bridge, connects it to the Kirya. The towers are one of the most prominent features of the city's skyline and are named after the project's initiator, David Azrieli.

Construction of the fourth Azrieli Center building, named the "The Spiral Tower" began in 2018. The tower is set to become the tallest in Israel, standing 350 meters high with 91 floors. Construction is scheduled for completion in 2028.

In 2026, the towers were allegedly a target of FlyDubai flight FZ1073. Had the co pilot not been thwarted after the intervention of the captain and passengers, the aircraft would’ve been flown into the complex.

== History ==
=== Project and construction ===
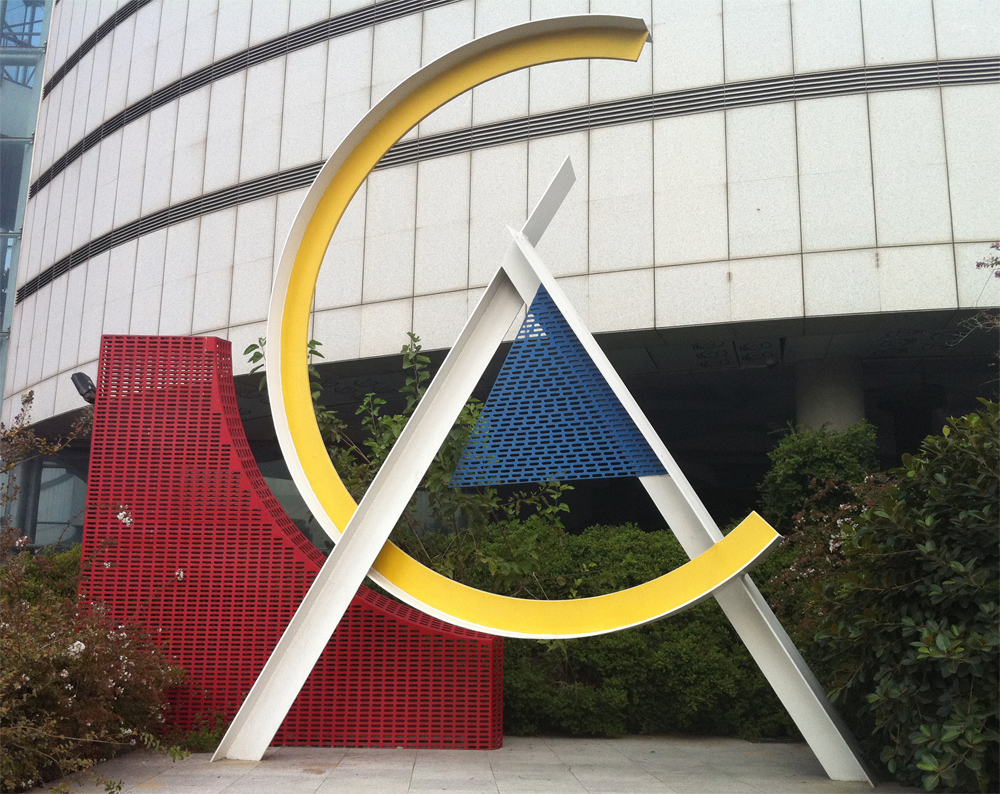
Azrieli Group logo at the base of the towers.

Before the construction of the center and the towers, the site was a parking lot for garbage trucks belonging to the Tel Aviv Municipality. The municipality also owned the land, not the Israel Land Administration, as is the case with most state land. Because of the plot's central location, the municipality initiated a construction plan for commerce and offices in the complex, through the municipal company Ezra and Bezron. Entrepreneur David Azrieli first approached the municipality in 1984 and proposed establishing the project. However, in 1986, a planning dispute broke out between Azrieli and the municipality, which rejected the plan he proposed for the "Peace Center" (as the project was called at the time, a name given by the municipality, due to its location on the Peace Road). Meanwhile, the municipality continued with the planning procedures and in April 1987 announced that it would hand over the project to a developer of its choice without a tender.

The plan presented by the municipality included: 115,000 m^{2} (1,240,000 sq ft) of offices in six towers of 20 to 40 floors and 35,000 m^{2} (380,000 sq ft) for the construction of a shopping and entertainment center. In addition, the construction of parking lots, where up to 3,000 vehicles can be parked. The plan was the largest construction and business project in Israel up to that time. The plan was approved in October 1987, and at that point the municipality announced that it would hold a tender, in two stages; first, it would issue a public tender to receive detailed proposals for the construction of the project. Then, the municipality representatives would hold discussions with the bidders, select them, and then issue a closed tender among about six entrepreneurs who appeared to be the most serious. Azrieli has not submitted a tender at this stage. Meanwhile, he inaugurated the Ayalon Mall (the first project he built in Israel) and won the tender to build the Jerusalem Mall, based on his experience in building shopping centers in Canada and the United States.

In December 1988, the five entrepreneurs who reached the final stage of the tender were selected, out of approximately 30, including the Australian company Westfield Group, which was owned by Frank Lowy, a group consisting of the Israel Corporation, Shaul Eisenberg and the Ashtrom company, and a proposal from David Azrieli, who finally decided to participate in the tender through the "Kenit" company (later the Azrieli Group). Discussions and negotiations with the three remaining teams continued until early 1992. In June 1992, Kenit and David Azrieli were announced as the winners.

In May 1993, "Kenit" received permission to begin digging the foundations for the project. In 1995, the "Kenit" company signed a lease agreement for the land with the Tel Aviv Municipality, which was exceptionally granted for 200 years (until 2195) and not for 50 years as is customary. The site of the complex measures 34,500 m^{2} (371,000 sq ft) and was previously used as Tel Aviv's dumpster-truck parking garage. The tower cost $420 million to build.

=== Controversies and disputes ===
The planning of the complex was done from its initial stages by architect Eli Attia. Its uniqueness is considered one of the reasons why "Kenit" won the municipality's tender to purchase the land (its bid was 14 million shekels lower than the competing bid). Attia was fired by Azrieli in January 1993. The dispute initially reached arbitration, where retired judge Hadassa Ben-Itto awarded Atia $1.5 million (amount of bills that Azrieli had not paid him) but ruled that Azrieli was entitled to use Atia's plans, in exchange for mentioning his name as the designer. After Azrieli wanted to change the design, Atia tried to torpedo this through legal means. Among other things, he requested that the original design regarding the windows and facade cladding be prohibited not to change the purpose of the square building to residential apartments only, and not to change the roof garden above the shopping center, Atiya argued that changing the window layout was a violation of the heart of the plan. According to him, instead of using white concrete and light blue mirrored glass, a request was received from "Kenit" to change the glass, which ultimately resulted in the construction of gray, heavy towers.

The dispute reached a hearing in the Supreme Court of Israel, where Atia claimed that changing the plan was an infringement of his intellectual property, but the court ruled that the amount he received in arbitration was paid in exchange for full rights to the project, including the right to make changes. Eli Attia was replaced by the Avraham Yaski office, which made many changes to the plan, the main ones being the reduction of public areas, redesigning the ground level, which included lowering it, increasing the number of parking spaces, redesigning the entrance, narrowing sidewalks, and reducing the volume of landscaping by about 80 percent.

=== First phase of the construction (1994–1997) ===
Excavation of the foundations began in 1994. During 1995, a tender was held to select the skeleton contractor, which was won by the "Cementchel" company in cooperation with the "Magil Pituach" company (a subsidiary of the "Magil Construction" group from Canada). In December 1996, an agreement was signed with the project's anchor tenant, Bezeq, which leased 17 floors in the Triangle Tower, about half of the tower's area. The aim was to centralize all its offices in one complex.

In January 1997, Electra Consumer Products was awarded the contract to perform the air conditioning work, for NIS 100 million. It was the largest air conditioning installation project carried out in Israel up to that time, in which approximately 8,000 tons of cooling systems were installed.

In September 1997, the construction of the round tower skeleton was completed, in a record time of 17 months, and three months later the construction of the triangular tower skeleton. However, delays in completing the interior work and the conflict with architect Attia over the design of the building envelope led to a delay in completing the two towers, and they were occupied from the beginning of 1999. According to the project's master plan, the round tower was supposed to be occupied only after the Kaplan Interchange was built, due to concerns about heavy traffic congestion in the area. However, a series of pressures exerted by Azrieli and the group's CEO Menachem Einan on the Tel Aviv Municipality led to the cancellation of the condition. The Kaplan Interchange only opened to traffic in March 2003. Azrieli also waged a long-running battle against the municipality's sewage levies, which reached the Supreme Court for consideration.

In May 2005, the Azrieli Group reported that the project was already generating an operating profit of 175 million shekels per year.

=== Second phase (1997–2007) ===
The start of construction of the square tower was delayed after Azrieli requested to change the original plan approved under the terms of the tender, including increasing the construction area in the square tower, from 15 to 20 thousand square meters and converting it from office space to residential space. The original agreement with the municipality stipulated that the tower would be inhabited by evacuees from offices operating in residential apartments in the city; the matter was defined as a strategic goal of the municipality, was incorporated into the project's master plan , and for this purpose, construction percentages were increased by one third to 450%. To encourage the transition, the municipality pledged to provide a 30% discount on property taxes for a period of 5 years. However, in practice, they were unable to recruit enough tenants according to this plan, and therefore requested that it be changed. In November 1997, the Tel Aviv Local Planning and Building Committee approved the change in principle. Construction of the tower began in early 1998 and was halted in September 1999 after completing only two floors due to a dispute with the Tel Aviv Municipality, because it demanded 130 million shekels in improvement levy due to the change in plan, from an office building to a more profitable building that would be a combination of a hotel and luxury apartments.

In October 2002, the local committee decided to cancel the condition that Azrieli must vacate 50,000 square meters of offices from residential areas. However, the dispute over the amount of the improvement levy continued for another two years, until arbitrator Meir Shamgar ruled for a payment of only $6 million, not $40 million as demanded by the Tel Aviv Municipality. Construction of the tower resumed in February 2006 and was completed at the end of 2007. As part of the construction of the square tower, an agreement was also signed between Azrieli, Yedioth Ahronoth and Netivei Ayalon, for the construction of Ben Yehuda and Noach Mozes Street, which allowed for the construction of an additional entrance and exit to the complex for vehicles from the north.

== Towers ==
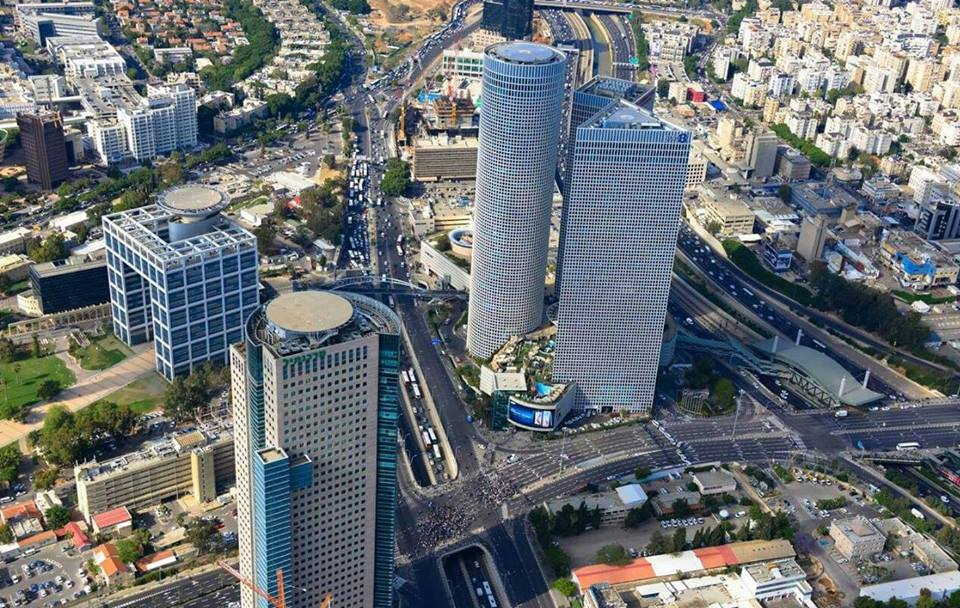
Aerial view of the towers

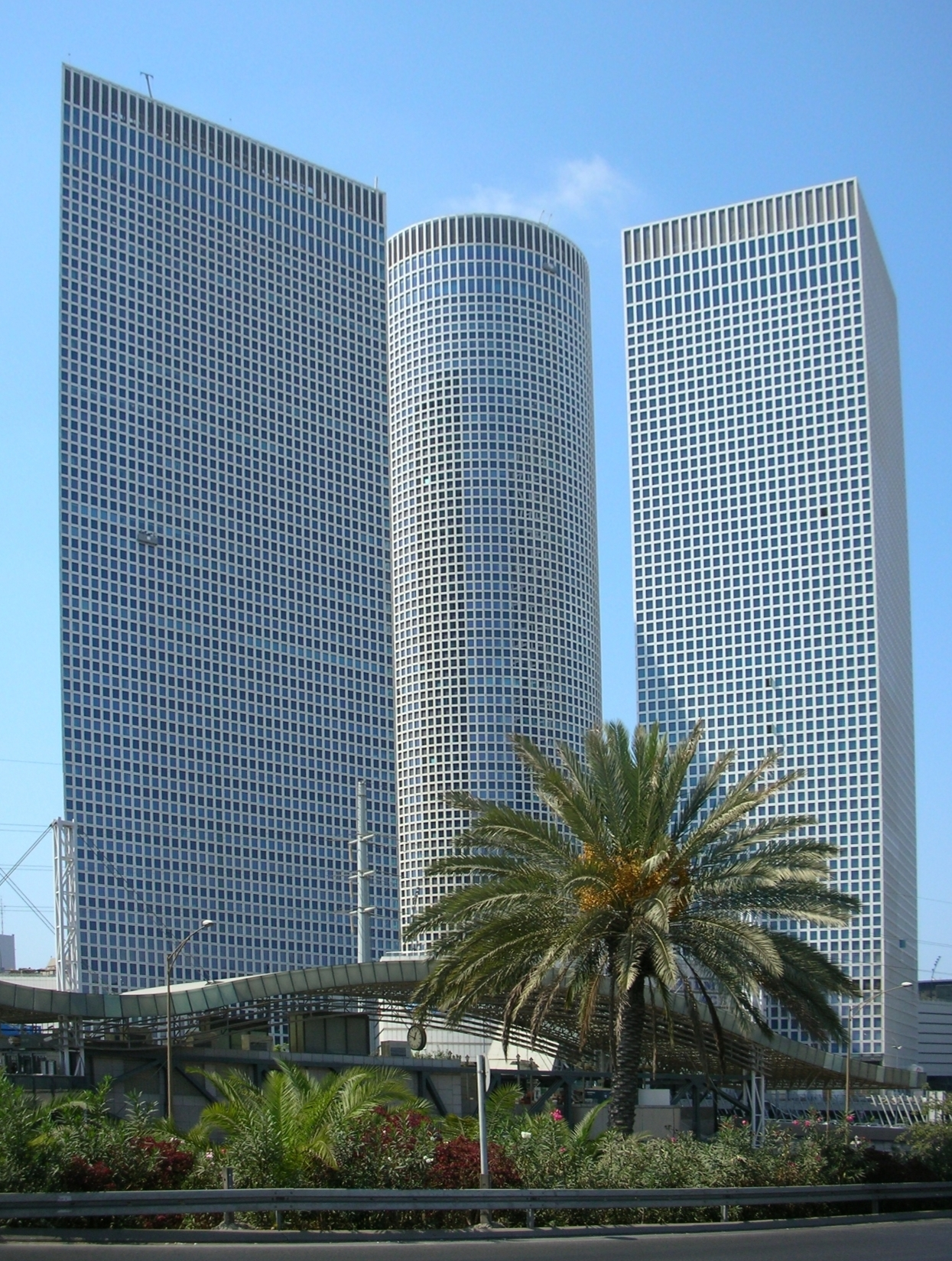
The three towers in 2007

Azrieli Towers illuminated at night

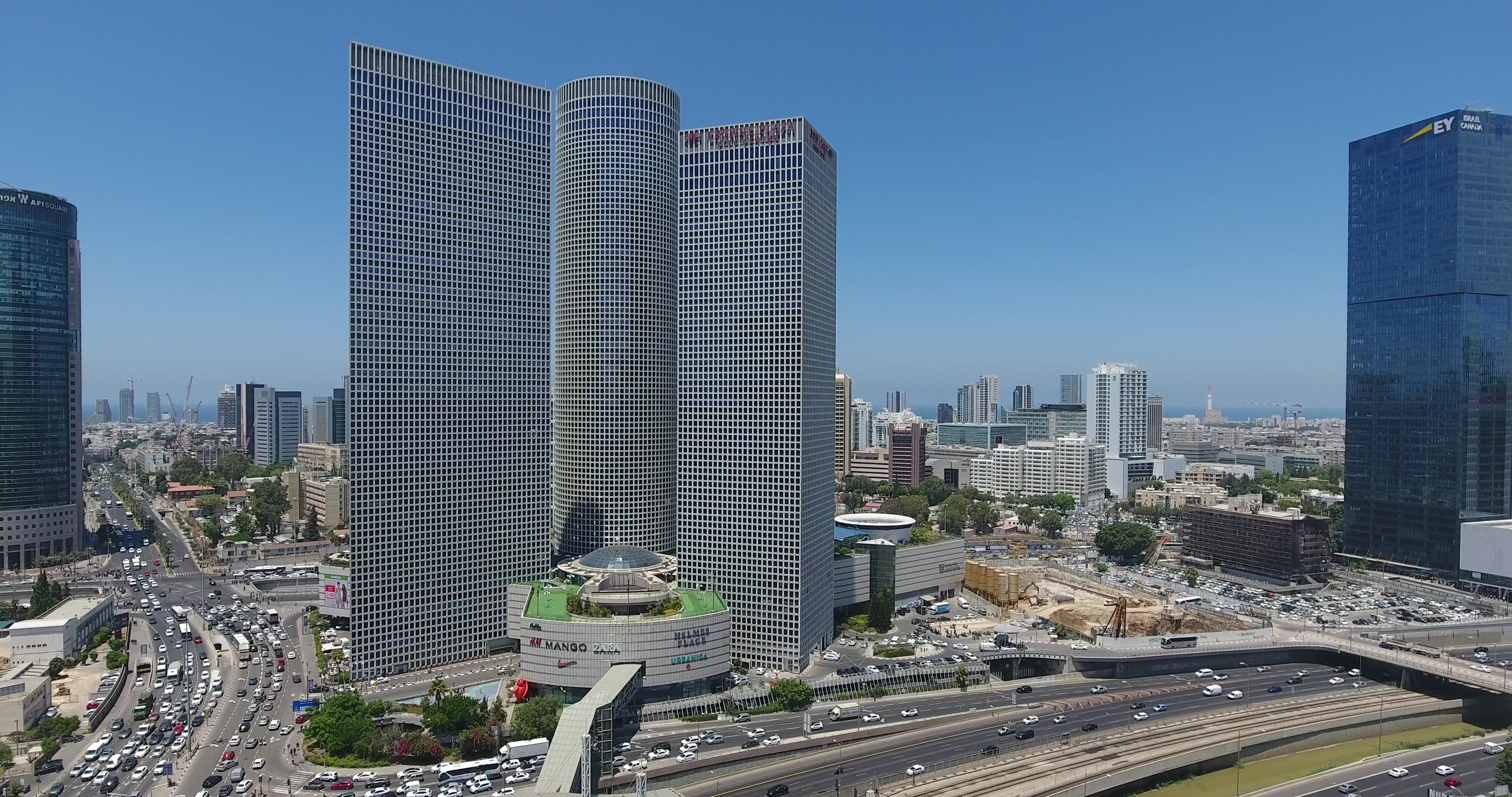
The Towers with the Midtown Tel Aviv (right) and the HaYovel Tower (left) in the background.

The Circular Tower (right) and the Triangular Tower (left) in 2006.

The towers during Year 2000's Eve.

Name	Image	Height m (ft)	Floors	Function	Completed	Ref
Spiral Tower		323 m (1,060 ft)	91	Mixed-use	2026	
Circular Tower		187 m (614 ft)	49	Office	1999	
Triangular Tower		169 m (554 ft)	46	Office	1999	
Square Tower		154 m (505 ft)	42	Office	2007	

=== Circular Tower ===
The Azrieli Center Circular Tower is the tallest of the three towers, measuring 187 m (613 ft 6 in) in height. Construction of this tower began in 1996 and was completed in 1999. The tower has 49 floors, making it at the time of its construction the tallest building in Tel Aviv, only to be surpassed by the Moshe Aviv Tower in Ramat Gan in 2001. The top floor has an indoor observation deck and a high-end restaurant, and the 48th floor is home to Mr. Azrieli's personal office.

Each floor of the Circular Tower has 84 windows, giving the tower more than 4,000 windows. The tower's perimeter is 141 meters (462 feet 7 inches); its diameter is 44 meters (144 feet 4 inches). Each floor covers 1,520 square metres (16,400 sq ft).

On October 31, 2003, the first annual Azrieli Circular Tower run-up competition was held, in which the participants ran up the 1,144 stairs to the tower's roof. Winners of the contest had the chance to participate in the following year's Empire State Building run-up competition in New York City.

=== Triangular Tower ===
The Azrieli Center Triangular Tower has a height of 169 m (554 ft 6 in). Construction of this tower, like the circular tower, began in 1996 and was completed in 1999. It has 46 floors and its main occupant is Bezeq, Israel's largest telecommunications company; Bezeq occupies 13 floors of the tower. The tower's cross-section is an equilateral triangle.

=== Square Tower ===
The Azrieli Center Square Tower was completed in June 2007. The tower has 42 floors, and is 154 m (505 ft 3 in) high. It is the shortest of the three towers in the Azrieli complex. Construction of the third tower was stopped in 1998 due to urban planning disagreements and was resumed in 2006.

The lower 13 floors house Africa Israel's Crowne Plaza business hotel. The upper floors are used as office space.

=== Spiral Tower ===
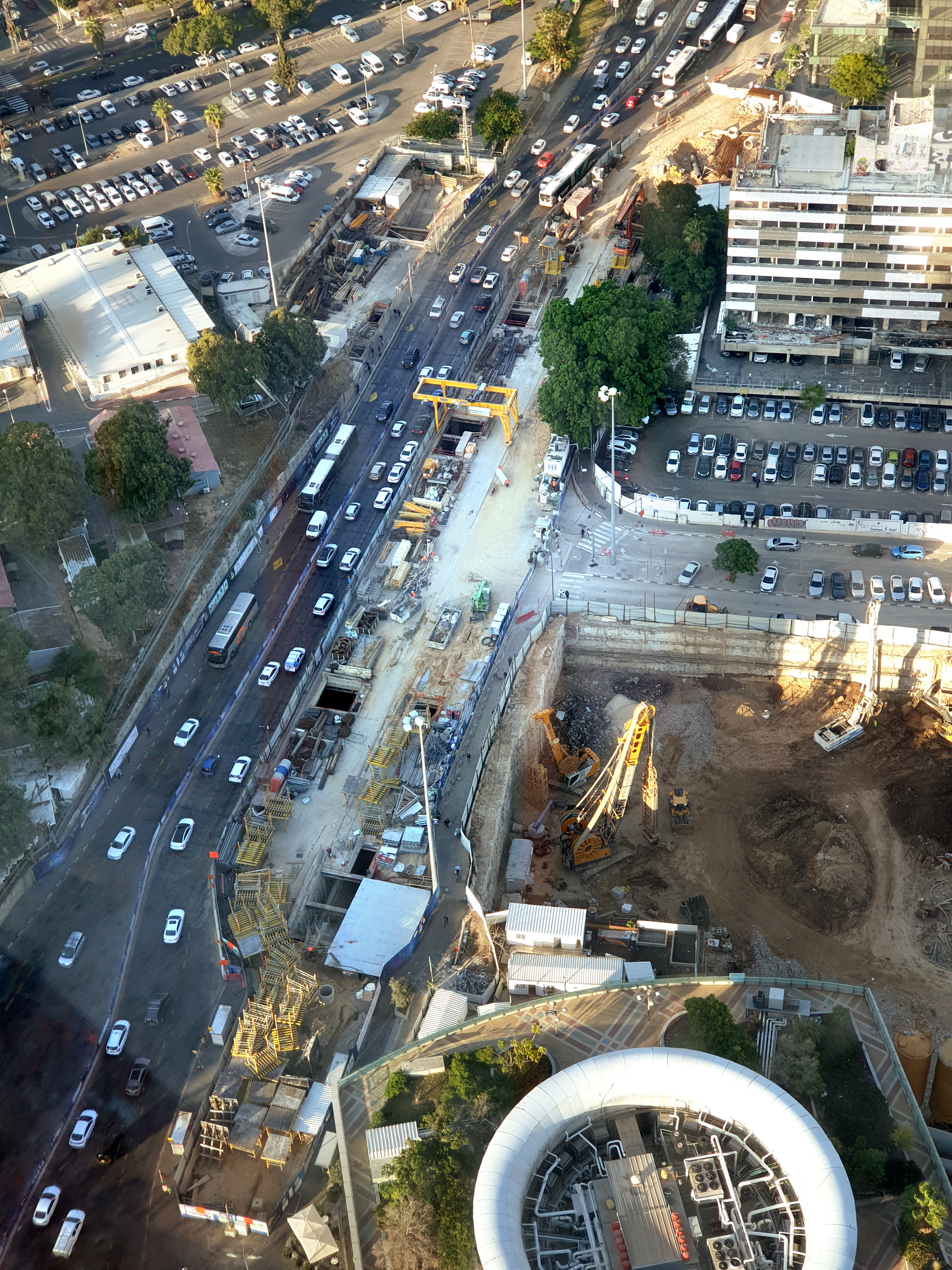
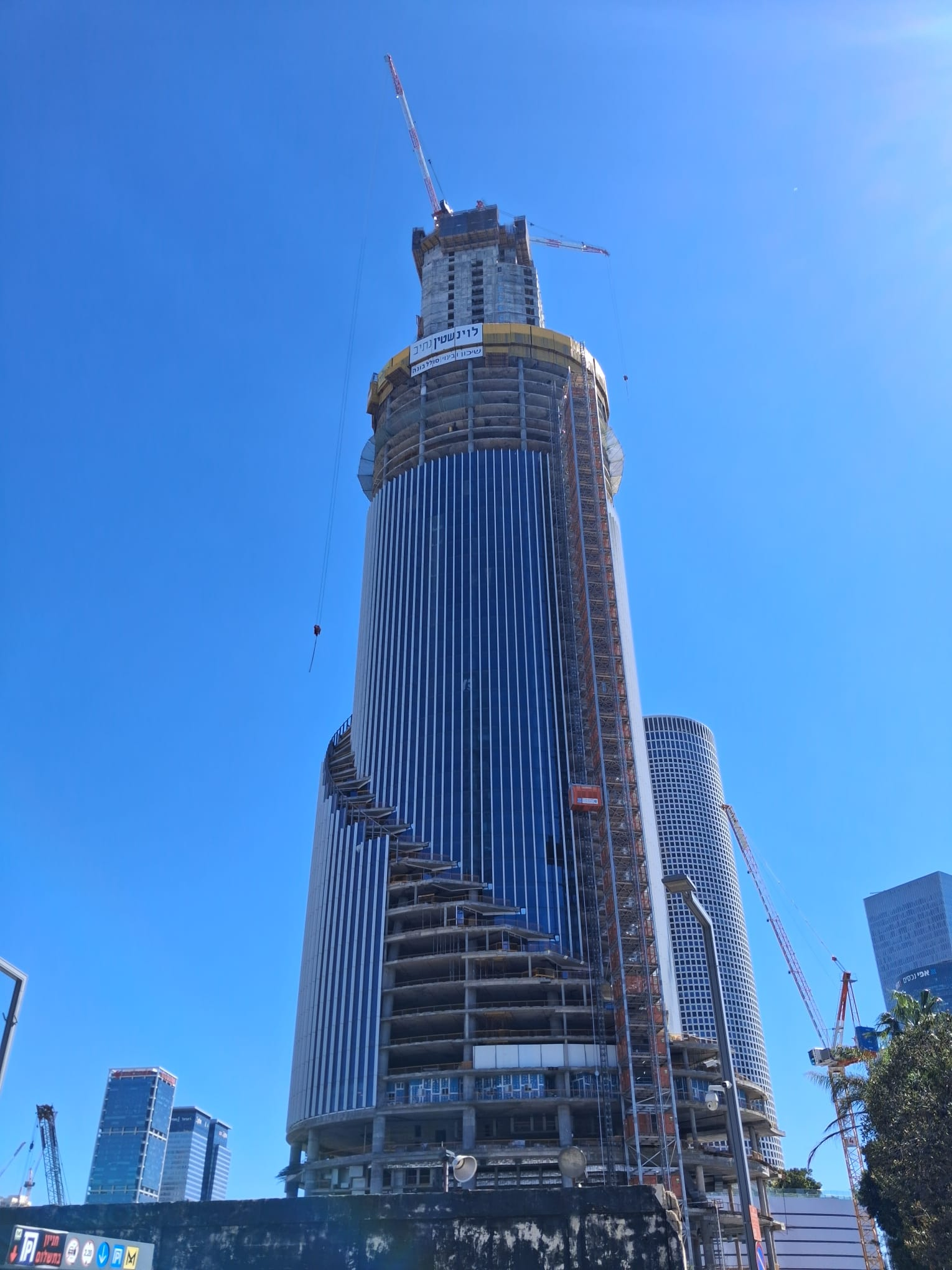
Azrieli Spiral Tower Under Construction (April 2026) (left), and the King Saul Station nearing the Spiral Tower during their construction (November 2019) (right)

The Azrieli Center Spiral Tower is an under-construction 91-floor, 323-meter high skyscraper which will be incorporated into the Azrieli Center complex. The Azrieli Tower will be the second-tallest in Israel when completed (completion expected in 2027), surpassing the current tallest skyscraper, Azrieli Sarona Tower, and ToHa Tower 2.

The building's floor area ratio will be 20.

In May 2013, the Azrieli Group purchased the Yedioth Ahronoth building next to the towers, with the aim of demolishing it and building another tower in its place – an elliptical one. The elliptical tower is expected to have 90 floors and rise to a height of approximately 350 meters. The new tower is expected to house office floors, commercial spaces (as an extension of the existing mall), public spaces, residential units, and floors for assisted living. The plan was approved by the District Planning Committee in October 2017.

In December 2018, the latest plan for the tower was published, which will be elliptical, but will also be designed in a spiral shape, so its design will be different from its predecessors. The new tower was designed by the architectural firm "Kohn Pedersen Fox" together with Moshe Tzur and, according to the published details, will include 91 floors and rise to a height of approximately 350 meters. It was also announced that construction work has begun and is in the lining and excavation stages, and its construction will be completed by the end of 2025. The base of the tower includes a six-level underground parking garage (which can be converted to other uses in the future after projects such as the light rail reduce demand for private vehicles) in an area of approximately 45,000 square meters plus a commercial floor with a direct connection to the King Saul station, as well as several commercial floors that will add approximately 13,000 square meters of commercial space to the mall at the base of the towers, along with approximately 2,000 square meters of public space that, according to the current outline, is designated for kindergartens. The tower is planned to include office space and 273 luxury apartments, as well as senior housing from the "Palace" senior housing chain from Azrieli. The tower will have 43 elevators, and on its top floor, a restaurant overlooking the urban landscape is planned, as well as an observation deck that allows for a 360-degree panoramic view.

In January 2021, a final building permit was received for the building. In September 2022, during the construction of the elliptical tower, a sinkhole opened up at the Peace Interchange, which caused the interchange to be closed for a month.

As of 2025, the Spiral Tower (also known as the "Azrieli Tower IV") is in advanced stages of construction at the Azrieli Center in Tel Aviv. The tower's skeleton has reached a height of approximately 60 floors, with approximately 30 more floors remaining to be built to complete the planned 88 floors (and a final height of approximately 336 meters). Upon its expected completion in 2026, it will become the tallest skyscraper in Israel.

== Facilities ==
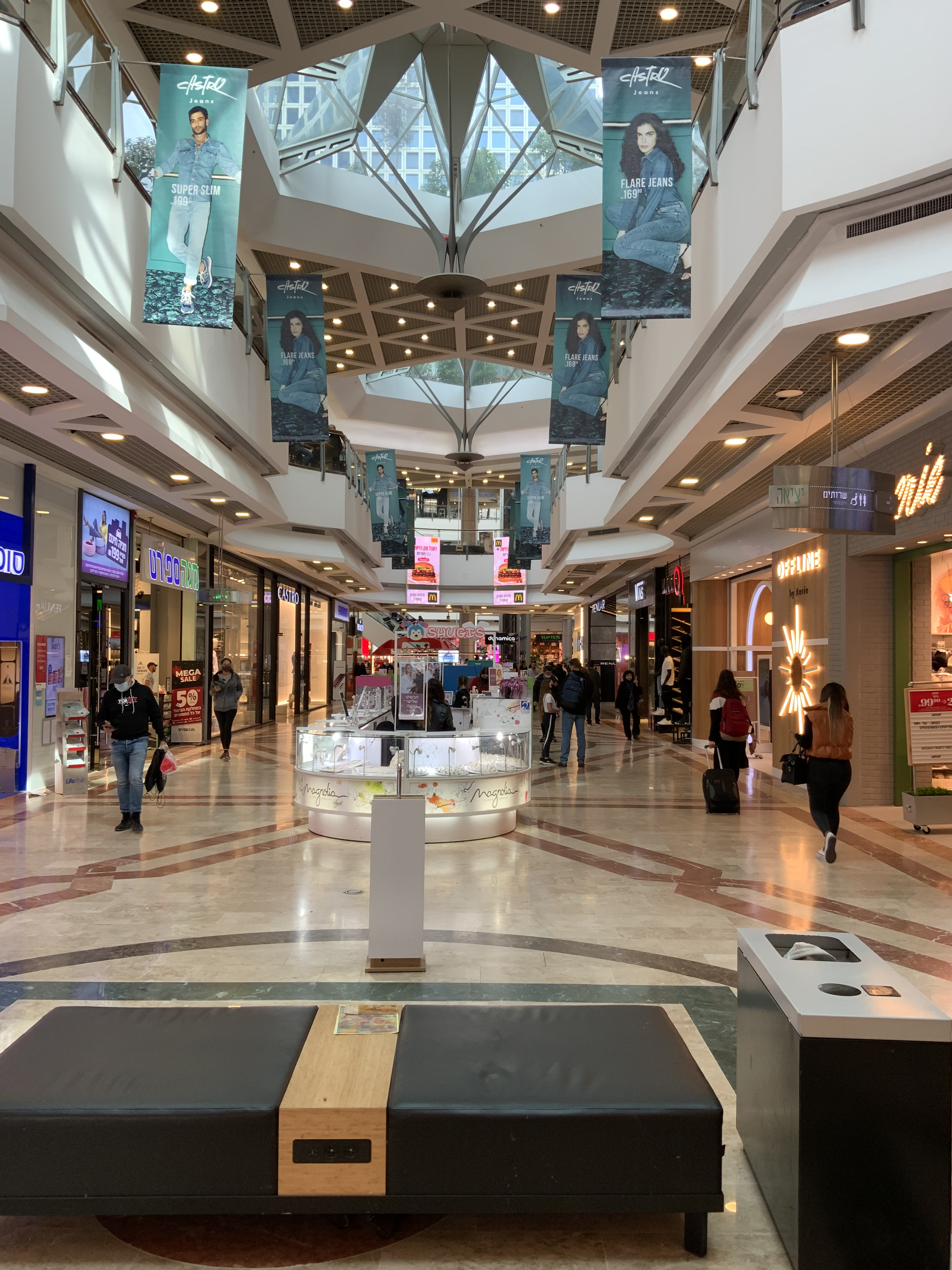
Interior view of Azrieli Center shopping mall

"The Drinking Pilot" sculpture at the entrance to the Azrieli Towers, by sculptor Assaf Lipshitz (left) and "The Zionist Journey of David Azrieli" by sculptor Henry Bezalel Tzafir, at the entrance to the Azrieli Mall. In November 2014, it was moved to the Haifa Mall (right)

=== Shopping center ===
The two lower floors of the center house a shopping mall with dozens of shops, about thirty restaurants, stalls and eateries. In the past, there was also a Globus cinema with eight screening rooms. The cinema closed on October 20, 2009 and was replaced by a branch of the fashion chain.

There is a supermarket on the entrance floor below the mall. Beneath the shopping center is one of the largest underground parking garages in Israel, with 3,200 parking spaces and four underground floors, the bottom two of which are partially reserved for subscribers.

The "Island" amusement park was built on the roof of the shopping center. Initially, the park was designed to be about the superhero "Spider-Man", coinciding with the release of the film series about the hero, and with the approval of the Marvel Comics company. Since then, the park has undergone a change to the design of a deserted island, which includes facilities such as a pirate ship, caves, castles and an amphitheater.

The area of the mall's commercial floors is approximately 35,000 square meters. According to future plans, the mall's area will be expanded to approximately 50,000 square meters when the complex's new elliptical tower is constructed

=== Other amenities ===
The large complex boasted an 8-screen cinema until 2010, when H&M took over the space. Azrieli also features a large fitness club, night schools, a small kid-focused amusement park and a pedestrian bridge leading to Tel Aviv HaShalom Railway Station. A second pedestrian bridge, completed in March 2003, connects the Azrieli Center with the other side of Begin Road, the Shaul HaMelech light rail station and HaKirya. It is expected that a connection between Kaplan underpass and the project's underground carpark, which is one of the largest ever built in the region, will be constructed. When completed, the 34,500 m^{2} (371,000 sq ft) plot which the Center occupies will offer a 400-seat, open air auditorium.

The Azrieli Center is bordered by the Ayalon Highway that crosses Tel Aviv from North to South, Begin Road and Giv'at HaTahmoshet Street (a short section that connects Kaplan Street with Ma'ale HaShalom). It is situated next to the HaShalom Interchange on the Ayalon Highway.

The center can be easily accessed from most parts of Israel by train to the Tel Aviv HaShalom Railway Station which is connected to the center by an enclosed pedestrian bridge or by one of the many buses that stop on Begin Road. In addition, the Tel Aviv Arlozorov Bus Terminal is located 1 kilometer (0.62 mi) north of the complex. Sha'ul HaMelekh LRT Station is located 5-minute walk from the complex.

Over the years, various works of art have been placed in and around the Azrieli Towers complex, reflecting the place's connection to culture and the urban public space in which it is located. The entrance to the center and the office building are decorated with stained glass windows created by artist Shadmi Sade from Kibbutz Nachshon.

== The complex in pop culture ==
- At the end of 1999, when the towers were not yet occupied, the top of the triangular tower was used to countdown to the year 2000, using giant numbers and letters created by computer-controlled lighting. Since then, the towers have served as a platform for presenting various messages to the general public, using lighting designs that were designed for them. A project to raise national morale was presented on them, and every year on Independence Day they are illuminated in the shape of the Israeli flag.
- In 2003, a local tradition began in the towers – the "Uphill Jump Race", a stair race in which competitors climb 1,144 steps in the round tower to the helipad at the top.
- The Israel Navigation Sports Association held park navigation events in the shopping center and the underground parking lot underneath it.
- In 2006, a tradition of a series of spinning classes began on the helipad at the top of the Round Tower. In 2007, 24 classes were held in a row, starting on Thursday afternoon and ending before the start of Shabbat.
- In August 2005, in the final episode of the reality show "End of the Road 2", a tightrope walk was performed between the roof of the round tower and the roof of the triangular tower without a safety net, but with full security
- In September 2007, a basketball court was built on the roof of the round tower, surrounded by an iron cage to prevent balls from falling. As part of these events, the draw for the basketball league games was also held on the roof of the tower.
- On February 10, 2009, the day of the elections for the 18th Knesset, the towers were illuminated with colored lights, to show the three leading parties and the number of seats they won, according to the sample of "News 10".
- On December 31, 2023, the towers were illuminated in yellow light as a sign of solidarity with those held hostage in Gaza.
- Starting with August 1, 2024, the number of days that the abductees have been in Hamas captivity in Gaza (starting from the 300th day of captivity) will be illuminated alongside.

== Panorama imaging ==
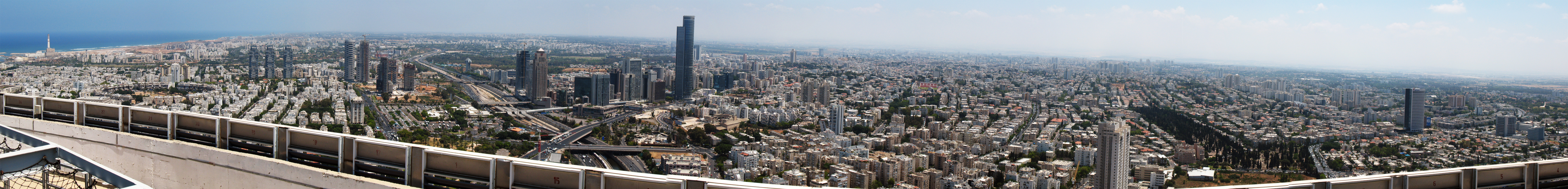
View from the Azrieli Towers east and north towards the neighborhoods of East Tel Aviv (Bitzeron on the right and Nahalat Yitzhak in the center) and North Tel Aviv, including Ramat Gan and Givatayim (2008)
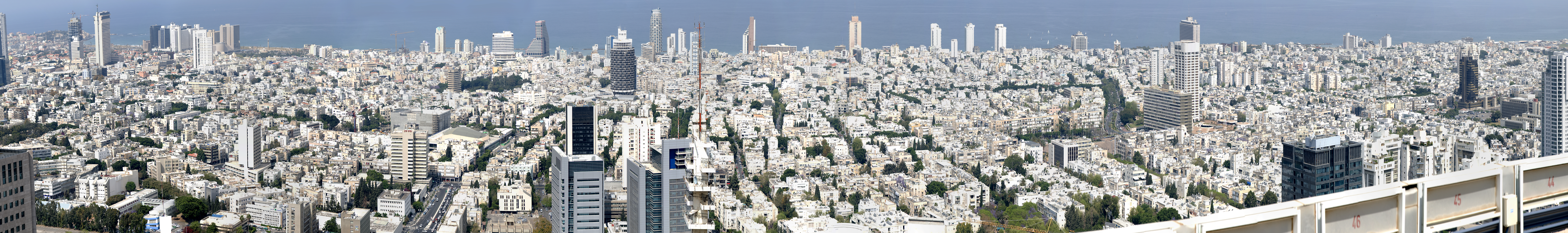
View from the Azrieli Towers towards the beach (2009)

== Gallery ==
Ground level view of the complex

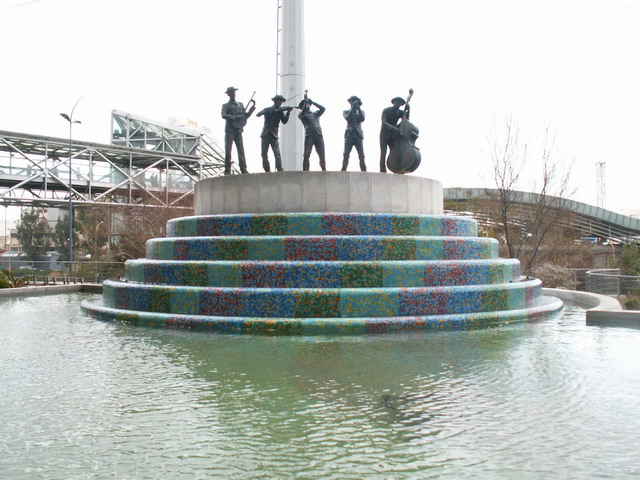
Fountain at the Azrieli Complex, dismantled in the late 2010s in favor of a pedestrian plaza

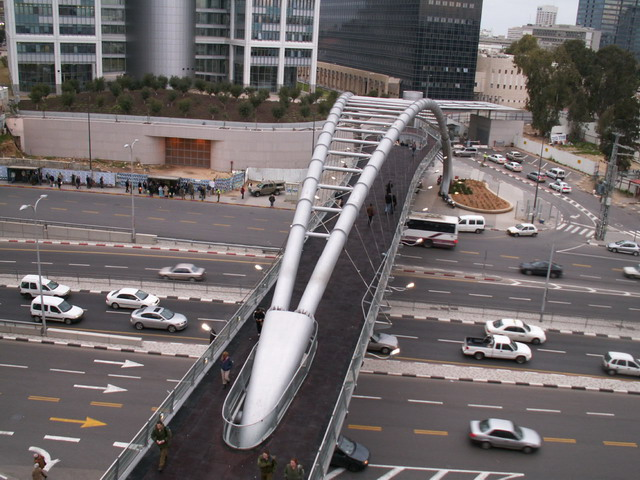
Bridge connecting foot traffic to the Complex

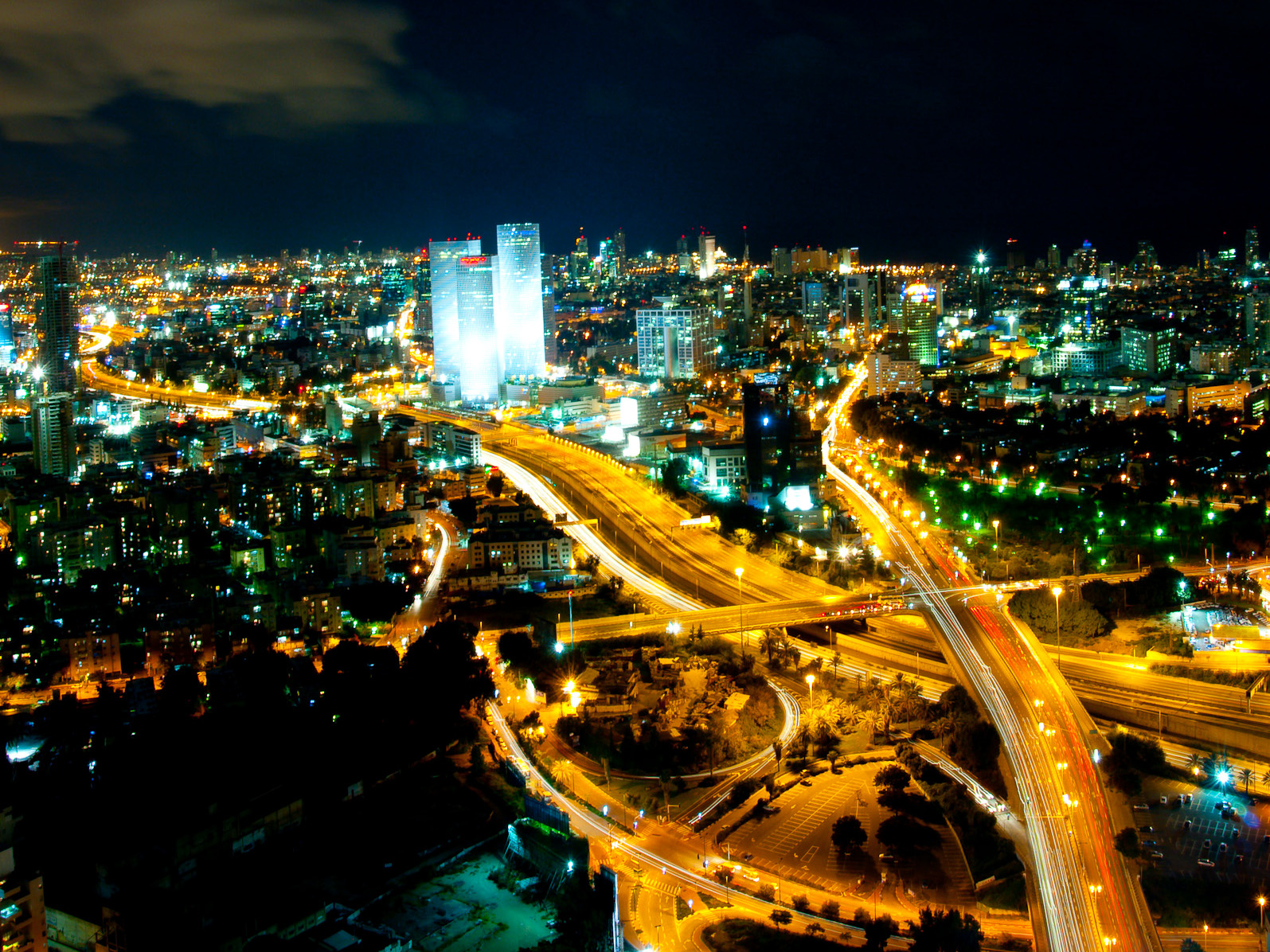
Azrieli Center at night

== See also ==
- List of skyscrapers in Israel
- List of tallest buildings in Tel Aviv
- List of shopping malls in Israel
- YOO Towers

Records
Preceded by Marganit Tower	Tallest building in Israel (Circular Tower); 1999–2001; 187 metres (614 ft)	Succeeded by Moshe Aviv Tower
