= Tambourine (disambiguation) =

The tambourine is a percussion instrument.

Tambourine, sometimes misspelled tamborine, may also refer to:

== Geography ==
- Tamborine, Queensland, locality in Australia

== Music ==
- Tambourine Studios, Swedish recording studio
- Tambourine (band), Dutch pop band
- The★tambourines, Japanese pop group

=== Albums ===
- Tambourine (album) by Tift Merritt (2004)

=== Songs ===
- "Tambourine" (song), by Eve
- "Tamborine", from the Prince album Around the World in a Day
- "Tambourine", song from the Elton John album Wonderful Crazy Night

== See also ==
- Tambora (disambiguation)
- Tambura (disambiguation)
- Tambourin, a form of Provençal dance and music
- Tamburello, a court game played with tambourine-like racquets
