= Tamburi (surname) =

Tamburi is an Italian surname. Notable people with the surname include:

- Luciana Tamburi (1952–2006), Italian actress and television hostess
- Orfeo Tamburi (1910–1994), Italian painter and scenic designer

== See also ==
- Tamburo
