= Tambora (drum) =

The tambora (from the Spanish word tambor, meaning "drum") is a two headed drum. In many countries, and especially in the Dominican Republic, tamboras were made from salvaged rum barrels. Performers on the tambora are referred to as tamboreros.

There are different types of tamboras, including:

- Tambora (Dominican drum), an Afro-Caribbean percussion instrument
- Tambora (Argentinian drum), a percussion instrument
- Tambora (Bolivian drum), a percussion instrument
- Tambora (Colombian drum), a percussion instrument
- Tambora (Mexican drum), a percussion instrument
- Tambora (Panamanian drum), a percussion instrument
- Tambora (Venezuelan drum), a percussion instrument

== See also ==
- Tambora (disambiguation)
