= Silvia de Grasse =

Panamanian jazz singer (1921–1978)

- Born: 28 October 1921; Panama City, Panama
- Died: 14 March 1978 (aged 56) San Juan, Puerto Rico
- Genres: Jazz and tamborera
- Instrument: claves
- Formerly of: Los Alegres Tres
- Spouse: Joseph Ernest Chapuseaux (m. 1932)

Silvia de Grasse (28 October 1921 – 14 March 1978) was a Panamanian jazz and tamborera singer. She was known as the "Queen of the Tamborera" in Panama and as "The Empress of Song" in the wider Latin America.

== Biography ==
De Grasse was born on 28 October 1921 in Panama City, Panama. She sang from a young age and became a professional artist aged 14, recording the songs "La Guajira," "La Morena Tumba Hombres," and "Hagan Ruedas." Her music was played on the City of Colón la Voz de la Víctor Radio Station (today the CPR La Primera Radio Station).

De Grasse collaborated with other Panamanian artists, such as organist and pianist Avelino Muñoz in 1938, and became known as the "Queen of the Tamborera" in Panama and as "The Empress of Song" in the wider Latin America.

De Grasse married Dominican vocalist Joseph Ernest Chapuseaux in 1942. The couple formed a musical trio called "Los Alegres Tres" with their friend Simmón Damirón in 1945. They moved to Santo Domingo in the Dominican Republic.

In the 1960s, de Grasse moved to New York City, United States, where she continued her career and performed with jazz musicians including Louis Armstrong, Nat King Cole, Sammy Davis Jr., Benny Moré, Tito Puente and Pedro Vargas. She toured to Europe in 1963.

De Grasse died on 14 March 1978 in San Juan, Puerto Rico, aged 56.
