= Tambura =

Tambura may refer to:

== Musical string instruments ==
- Tanbur, a category of long-necked string instruments originating in the Southern or Central Asia (Mesopotamia and Persia/Iran)
  - Tamboori, an Indian melodic instrument similar to a Tanpura
  - Tanpura, a stringed drone instrument played in India
  - Kurdish tanbur, used in Yarsan rituals
  - Turkish tambur, an instrument played in Turkey
  - Yaylı tambur, an instrument played in Turkey
  - Tanbūra (lyre), an instrument played in East Africa and the Middle East
- Tambura saz, string instrument from the Bağlama family from Turkey
- Balkan tambura, an instrument used in the Balkan region
- Tamburica, any member of a family of long-necked lutes traditional in the Balkan region or Southeastern Europe
- Tambouras, an instrument played in Greece

== Other ==
- Tambura River, Romania
- Tumbura, a town in South Sudan
  - Tumbura Airport, an airport serving the above town
- Tambur, an old name for Hemşin, a town in Rize Province, Turkey
- "Tambura", a hidden track from P.O.D.'s album The Fundamental Elements of Southtown

== See also ==
- Bandura, a Ukrainian instrument
- Dombra, an instrument in Kazakhstan, Siberia and Afghanistan
- Domra, a Russian instrument
- Pandura, an instrument played in Ancient Greece and other ancient civilisations from the Mediterranean basin
- Tambora (disambiguation)
- Tambourine (disambiguation)
- Tamburo, a surname
- Tamburo (film), a 2017 Indian film
