= Kaplan Interchange =

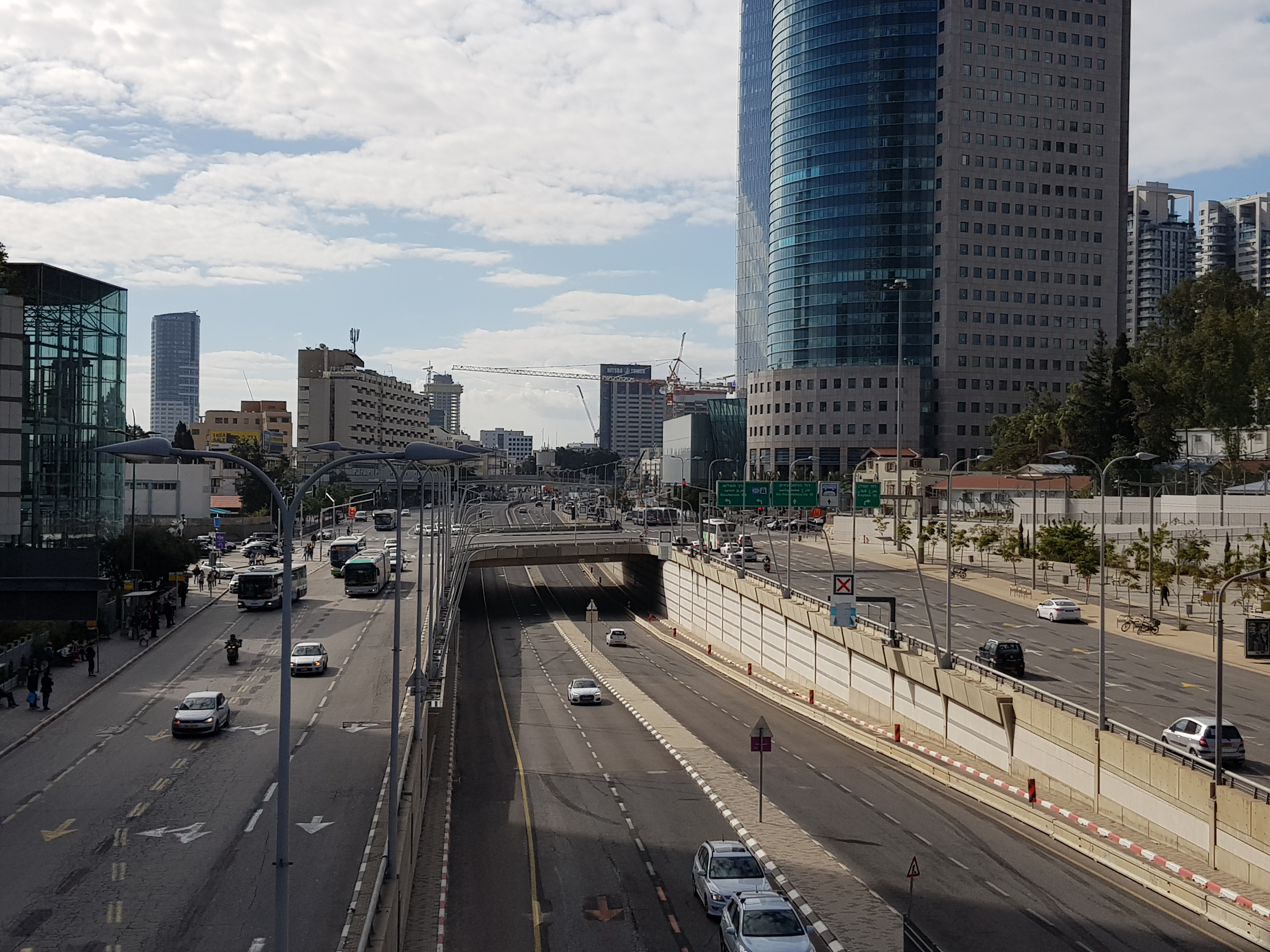
- Image of the Kaplan Interchange

Location
- Tel Aviv, Israel
- Coordinates: 32°04′24″N 34°47′25″E
- Roads at junction: Kaplan Street, Begin Road

Construction
- Type: Road intersection
- Opened: 31 March 2003

Kaplan Interchange (Hebrew: מחלף קפלן) is an intersection between Kaplan Street and Begin Road in the Israeli city of Tel Aviv. According to data from the Transport Ministry, the intersection averages more than 100,000 vehicles passing through each day. The intersection is adjacent to major office areas, such as HaKirya and Sarona, and is a block away from Highway 2.

== History ==
=== Early modifications ===
The location of the Kaplan Interchange was first mentioned in 1964. The interchange was a T-junction at the time, and parts of Kaplan Street did not yet exist. Construction of the extension began in 1966 with two steel bridges built over the Ayalon River. In 1968, Kaplan Street underwent widening to two lanes each direction. In 1971, the Minister of Transportation Shimon Peres proposing a plan for grade separation in the intersection, and a budget was later approved but was left unimplemented. In 1981, Petah Tikva Road (now Begin Road) also underwent widening to accommodate for public transportation.

=== Planning and construction ===
In 1987, the Tel Aviv Municipality approved plans for the construction of the Azrieli Center, which included modifications for the adjacent Kaplan Interchange. The plan was the largest construction plan in Israel at the time, and involved the construction of 115,000 m^{2} (1,240,000 sq ft) of offices and 35,000 m^{2} (380,000 sq ft) of shopping and entertainment space in six towers, each with 20 to 40 floors. The plans also included a nearby parking lot of up to 3,000 vehicles, and upgraded nearby roads to accommodate for increased traffic. The upgrades for Kaplan Interchange in particular were required in order to receive a completion certificate from the municipality.

Following delays relating to the construction of Azrieli Center, the construction planning for the interchange finally began in 1999 with five different plans under consideration. This included a plan from architect Israel Goodovitch, but was rejected for its high cost. A cheaper alternative was chosen, and soon a budget was approved.

=== Since opening ===
On 31 March, 2003, the upgrades on Kaplan Interchange were completed, and the intersection reopened. The modifications cost $90 million shekels in total, and traffic volume was expected to increase from 100,000 vehicles daily before the upgrades, to 150,000 daily after the intersection reopened.

Since the 2010s, the Kaplan Interchange has become a popular location for protests in Israel. Different groups have held demonstrations in Kaplan Interchange for various causes, including supporters of the 2018–2019 Gaza border protests, social workers demanding wage increases, members of the LGBT community opposed to the Surrogacy Law, protests from Ethiopian immigrants, supporters of the Yellow vests protests, and participants of the 2023 Israeli judicial reform protests. During the judicial reform protests, the Mayor of Tel Aviv Ron Huldai decided to change the name of the intersection to Democracy Square (כיכר הדמוקרטיה).
