= Pinzon =

Pinzon or Pinzón may refer to:

- Pinzón, Buenos Aires, a settlement in Pergamino Partido, in Argentina
- Pinzon (trademark), a private label for a product line of Amazon.com
- Pinzón (surname), people with the surname Pinzón
- Pinzón Island
