= Chavelita Pinzón =

Panamanian folklorist and singer

- Born: Cecilia María Pinzón Vergara; 13 February 1931; Panama
- Died: 18 March 2024 (aged 93)
- Education: University of Panama
- Occupation(s): Folklorist, singer

Cecilia María Pinzón Vergara (13 February 1931 – 18 March 2024), known as Chavelita Pinzón, was a Panamanian folklorist and singer, one of the most recognized figures in her country's folk scene. She was a teacher of folk dances at the Dance School of the National Institute of Culture, where she directed Panama's first folkloric ensemble. She took Panamanian dance troupes on domestic tours and to several cities abroad, including Washington D.C. and New York, New York.

== Early life ==
Chavelita Pinzón's mother is a native of Guararé in the Los Santos District, and her father was born in La Chorrera District. She held a licentiate in philosophy and letters with a specialization in pedagogy from the University of Panama.

Pinzón became a teacher at the Dance School of the National Institute of Culture (then named the Institute of Fine Arts, a dependency of the Ministry of Education), where she specialized in teaching typical Panamanian folk dancing and singing to children. From there she directed and organized the country's first typical children's ensemble.

Pinzón was a teacher at the Instituto Normal Rubiano, and was part of the Tobías Plicet typical ensemble. With this group she went to Buenos Aires, Argentina in 1961, where they won second prize for international folklore, and Pinzón won the prize for the first vocalist.

Pinzón was a well-known Tamborera singer.

== Presentations abroad ==
Chavelita Pinzón brought Panamanian music and typical dances to prominent venues outside the country. In 1979, the first generation of her children's folkloric ensemble attended the Children's Festival, held in Washington D.C., where they had the opportunity to perform for President Jimmy Carter.

In 2001, her folkloric ensemble participated in the Children's Art Festival held in Naples, Italy. During this visit her students shared an audience with Pope John Paul II at the Vatican.

== Recognition ==
In 1993, Pinzón was recognized with the Order of Vasco Núñez de Balboa.

In 2003, she was the standard bearer for the 148th anniversary of La Chorrera District, where she highlighted the importance of its traditional dances, which she defined as "the only ones of their kind in the entire Republic".

For her outstanding career as a folklorist, in 2003 she was honored at the National Handicrafts Fair with a plaque of recognition and the official establishment of a children's folkloric ensemble contest in her honor.

On 28 November 2006, the town of Betania named her Meritorious Daughter during the parade celebrating Panama's independence from Spain.

Pinzón received an honorary diploma from the National Institute of Culture for her dedication as an educator and promoter of Panamanian folklore.

== Death ==
Pinzón died on 18 March 2024, at the age of 93.
