= Avelino Muñoz =

Panamanian musician and composer

Avelino Muñoz (December 20, 1912 – January 24, 1962) was a Panamanian musician and composer.

== Early life ==
Muñoz was born in Panama to José Muñoz Moyeja and Clotilde Barrios. He grew up in their musical household, where all brothers learned how to play the piano. Avelino became a composer, organist and writer.

== Career ==
His career began in Panama, scoring silent films. In 1938, Avelino made his first record. He curated an ensemble of musicians. Muñoz received inspiration from and inspired others through collaborations with artists such as Armanda Boza, Silvia de Grasse, and Fernando Fernández Reyes.

== Personal life ==
He was the father of Puerto Rican writer, sportscaster, actor, and musical promoter Avelino Muñoz Stevenson. He died on January 24, 1962, due to a cerebral hemorrhage.
