= Begin Road =

Street in Tel Aviv, Israel

Coordinates: 32°4′0.84″N 34°47′5.73″E

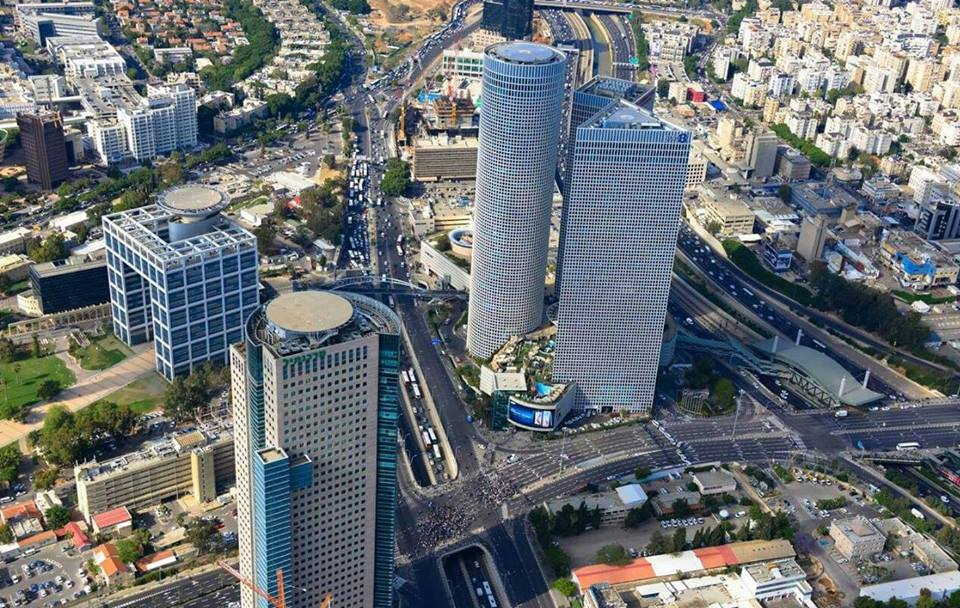
Begin Road and, on the right, Azrieli Center

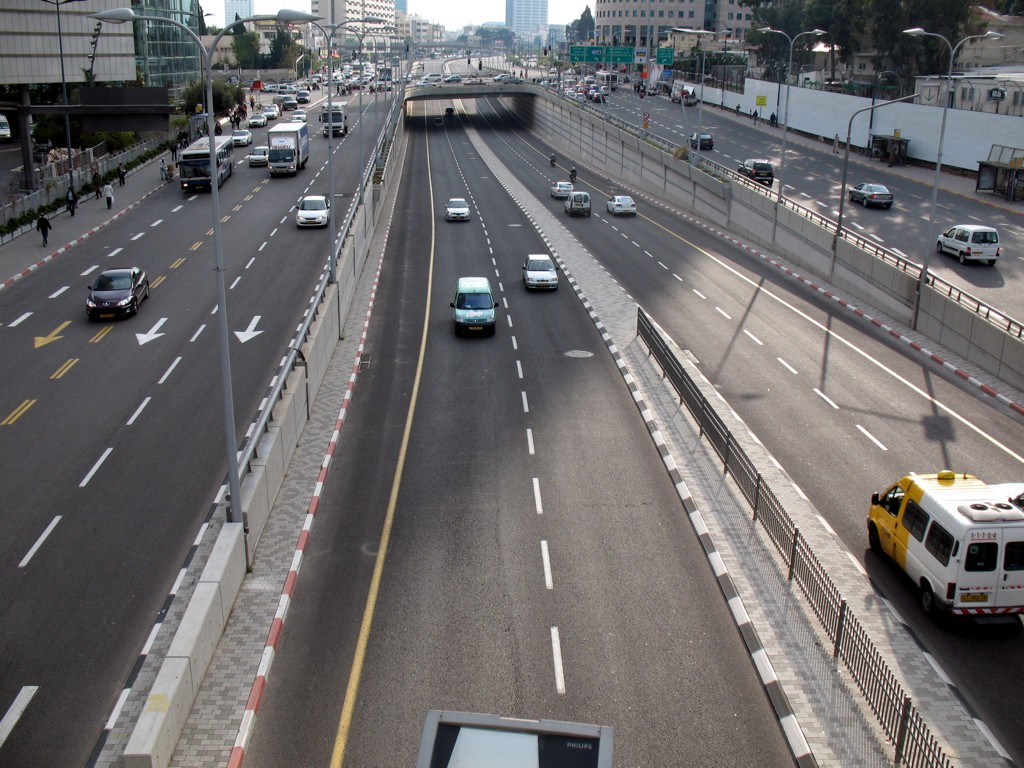
Looking south from HaKirya pedestrian bridge

Begin Road is a major thoroughfare in Tel Aviv, Israel. It begins at Allenby Street and runs to its northern end which is at Arlozorov Interchange on Ayalon Highway.

There is one interchange along Begin Road, Kaplan Interchange, located near Azrieli Center and Tel Aviv HaShalom railway station, with two lanes in each direction passing under Kaplan Street.

Another interchange, Ma'ariv Bridge, was demolished on August 21, 2015, as part of the works to build the Carlebach station of Tel Aviv Light Rail; several alternative designs were considered in 2014.

Begin Road is a section of the ancient road from Jaffa Clock Tower to Nablus in Samaria. On the Survey of Palestine map from 1944, the whole section north of the old Tel Aviv central bus station is named Petah Tikva Road. In 2001, its part within the city boundaries of Tel Aviv-Yafo, i.e. west of Ayalon Highway, was renamed after Menachem Begin. The rest of the former Petah Tikva Road, lying in the cities of Ramat Gan, Bnei Brak and Petah Tikva itself, is nowadays known as Jabotinsky Street.
