= Ayalon Mall =

Shopping center in Ramat Gan, Israel

Coordinates: 32°6′0″N 34°49′36″E

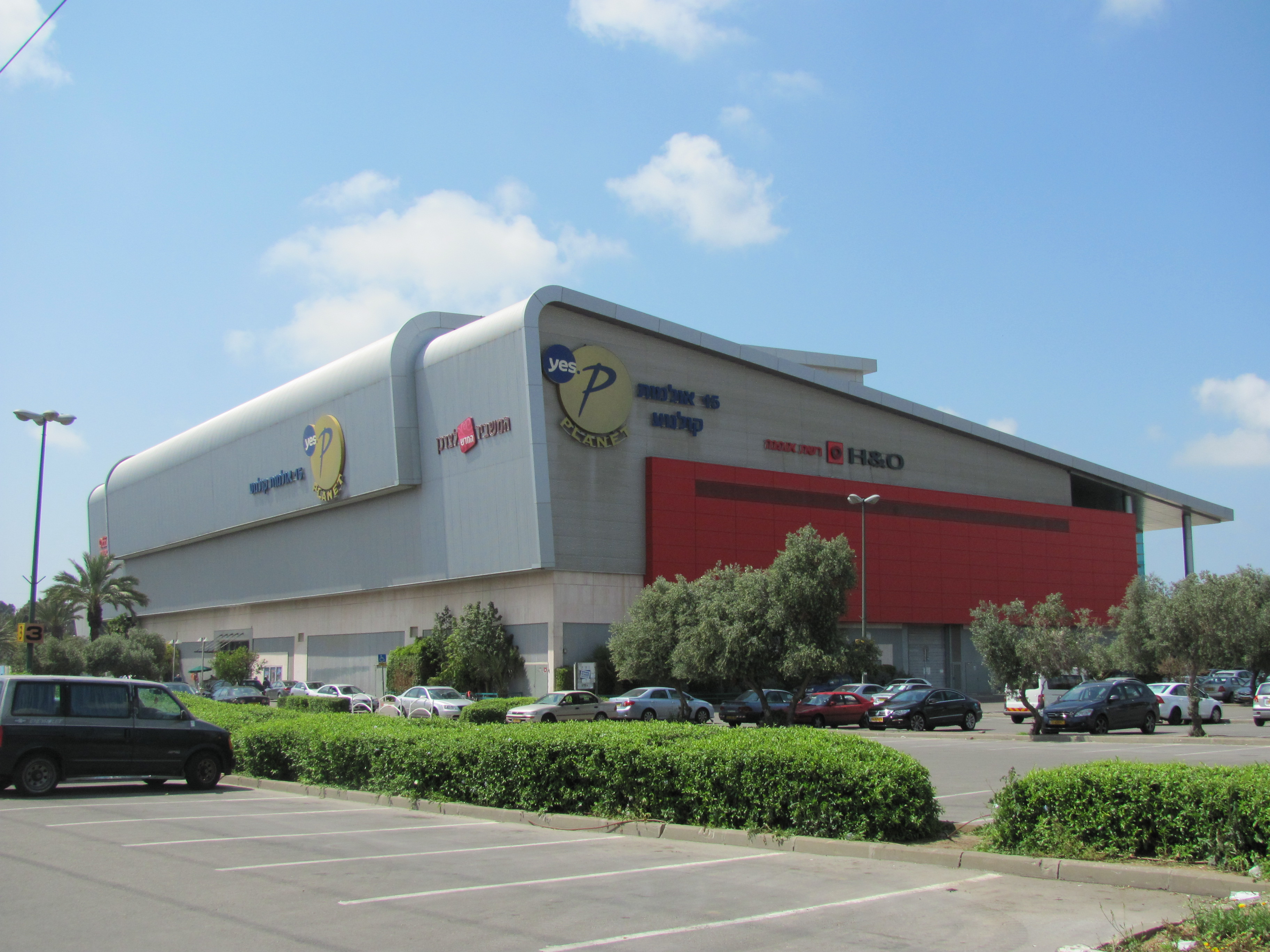
Ayalon Mall

Ayalon Mall (Hebrew: קניון איילון, Kanyon Ayalon) is a mall in Ramat Gan, Tel Aviv District, Israel.

== History ==
Opened in July 1985, Ayalon Mall was the first mall in Israel to have a large shopping complex outside the city centre with a parking lot surrounding it. Ayalon Mall is also notable for its owner, David Azrieli, inventing the word for "mall" in Hebrew for this mall, "kanyon".

In addition, Ayalon Mall is the place of the first McDonald's location in the Middle East, which opened there in 1993. The mall was originally one story tall, but in 2006 an extension which contains a second floor with cinemas above some of the mall was built. A second extension in 2015 added many shops and restaurants.

The mall is built near the Ramat Gan Stadium and Bnei Brak Railway Station. The mall contains international stores such as Zara, and Aldo, in addition to Israeli chains such as Castro, Fox, and Honigman.

== New additions ==
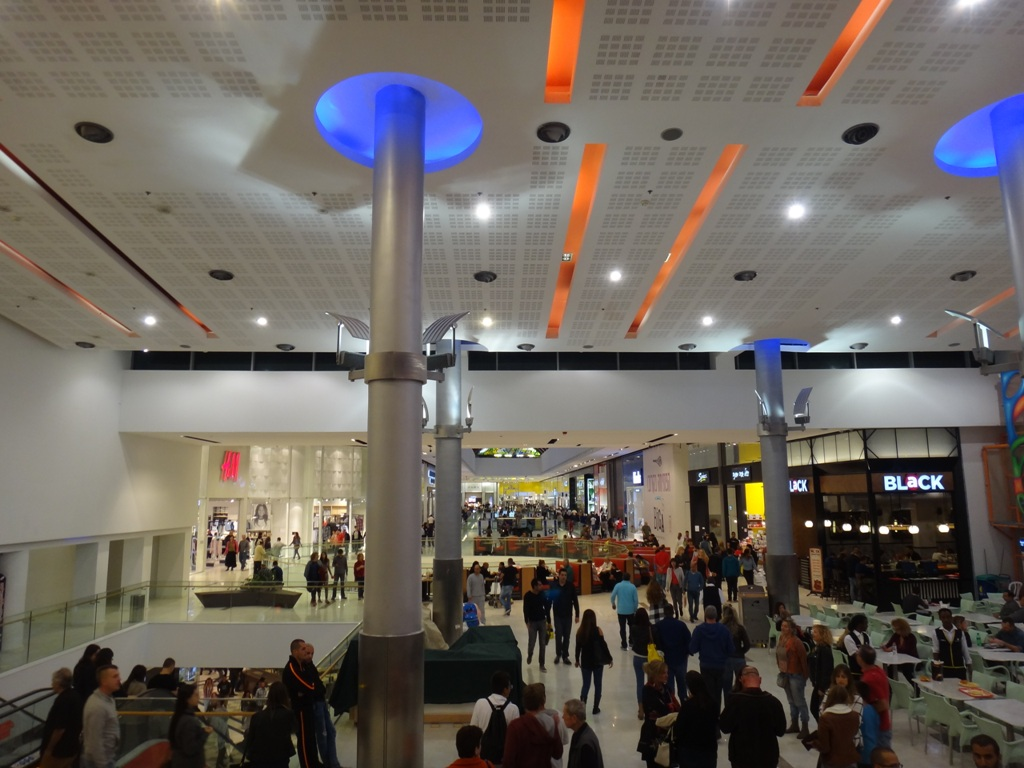
Inside view of the mall's second floor

In July 2006, a partial new two-story wing was added, which included a 15 screen movie theatre, "Yes Planet" (sponsored by the Israeli satellite company Yes), and some fast food restaurants. The new theatre replaced the old approximately 10-year-old one, which had only 4 screens. The old cinema was replaced with about 10 new stores.

In mid 2014, the construction of the second floor extension had begun, and in April 2015 the construction was completed. The second floor extension contains the addition of several more international stores, such as American Eagle, H&M, Desigual and Forever 21.

== See also ==
- Azrieli Center
- Ramat Gan Stadium
- List of shopping malls in Israel
