= Tambora (Venezuelan drum) =

Venezuelan drum

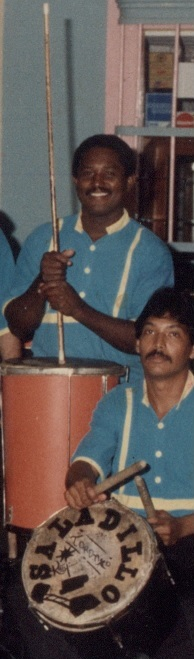
Furro (left) and Tambora (right)

In Gaita zuliana music, from Venezuela, the tambora is a one-headed drum played with sticks. The player can sit on it or put it between his or her legs to perform rhythms on the instrument by hitting the head, the rim, or the body of the drum.
