= Gran Coquivacoa =

- Origin: Cabimas, Zulia, Venezuela
- Genres: Gaita zuliana
- Years active: 1968–present
- Members: Neguito Borjas; Jesús Petit; Oscar Borjas; Marcos Díaz; Michell
- Website: http://www.grancoquivacoa.net

Gran Coquivacoa is a Venezuelan gaita zuliana group founded in 1968 by Jesús "Bocachico" Petit, Nelson Suárez, Rody Tigrera, Pedro Arteaga and Manolo Salazar in Cabimas, Zulia State.

They were named Best Gaita Artist at the 2015 Pepsi Venezuela Music Awards.

== Discography ==
=== Studio albums ===
- Con El Conjunto Gran Coquivacoa (1969)
- Gran Gaitón (1970)
- Seguimos Gateando (1971)
- El Gaitón del Diablo (1972)
- Fiesta Santoral (1973)
- Los Reyes de la Tamborera (1974)
- Los Reyes de la Tamborera (1975)
- Los Reyes de la Tamborera (1976)
- Gran Coquivacoa (1977)
- Gran Coquivacoa (1978)
- Libertad (1979)
- Soy Zuliano (1980)
- El Gran Coquivacoa (1981)
- Los Reyes de la Tamborera (1982)
- 15 Aniversario (1983)
- La Catira de la Guaira (1984)
- y Punto (1985)
- Completo (1986)
- La Maquina del Sabor (1987)
- La Maquina del Sabor (1988)
- La Alianza (1989)
- La Maquina del Sabor (1990)
- La Maquina del Sabor (1991)
- La Maquina del Sabor (1992)
- La Maquina del Sabor 25 años (1993)
- Los Súper Reyes de la Tamborera (1994)
- De Antología (1995)
- Alegrando Corazones (1996)
- Alquimia (1997)
- 30 Aniversario (1998)
- Unplugged (Desenchufao) (1999)
- Por siempre Gaitas (1999)
- Energía Universal (2000)
- …de punto alfa (2001)
- En Alta Vibración (2002)
- Guerreros de la Luz (2003)
- Luminós (2004)
- Madre Tierra (2008)
- Gran Coquivacoa (2009)
- Neguito y sus Invitados (2011)

=== Compilation albums ===
- Grandes Exitos (1986)
- La Maquina del Sabor con todo (1990)
- 30 Aniversario (1998)

== See also ==
- Gaita zuliana
- Music of Venezuela
