= Tamburo =

Tamburo is a surname. Notable people with the surname include:

- Dick Tamburo (1930–2020), American football player
- Mike Tamburo (born 1977), American musician
- Sam Tamburo (1926–1998), American football player

== See also ==
- Tamburo (film), a 2017 Indian film
- Tambura (instrument), a family of musical instruments
