= Tambour (company) =

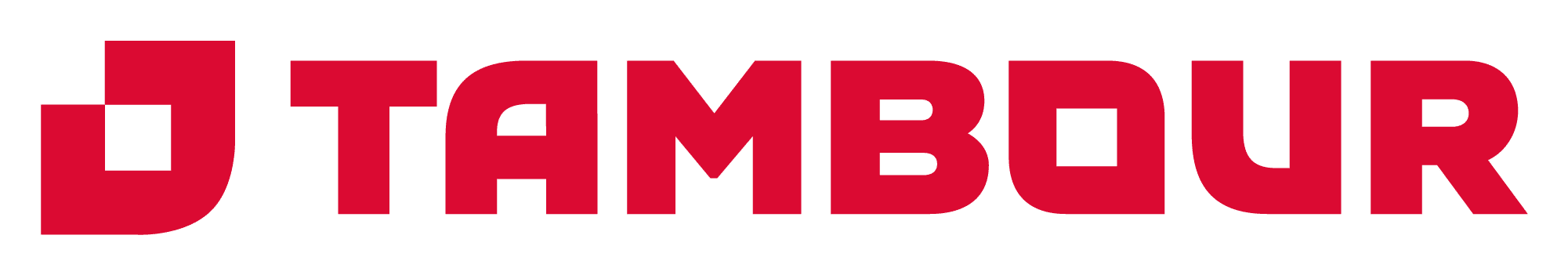
Tambour's logo since 2023

Tambour (Hebrew: טמבור) is an Israeli company engaged in the manufacture of paint, coatings and advanced construction materials. The company was founded in Israel in 1936. In 2014, Singapore-based holding company, Kusto Group, acquired Tambour.

== Overview ==
Tambour's main activities are manufacturing, importing and marketing of paints and related materials such as sealants, coatings, paint thinners and gypsum. The company has production sites in Acre, Gesher and Migdal HaEmek, with its headquarters in Netanya.

== History ==
The company was founded in 1936 by three immigrants from Germany and began operations near Haifa. In 1944 the company was acquired by the British conglomerate Jenson Nicholson. Most of the activity in the coming years sales was the British Army and Navy. By 1952 a new factory was built in the industrial area of Acre.

By 1960 the company sold a number of partners: Israel Economic Corporation-PEC (group IDB), England-Israel Securities and a group of private investors. By 1962 the company sold most of Lflskon, the largest manufacturer of paint in South Africa.

Tambor was a private company until 1993 then went public in on the Tel Aviv Stock Exchange. In 2001 Discount Investments sold its share of Granite Carmel and following receipt of full tender offer trading company was deleted. In 2005 stock was issued again and Tambour again became a public company, until being de-listed in 2012.

The company has been declared a monopoly by Israel's Antitrust Authority in the interior paints sector. As of end 2011 the company employed 686 workers.
