= Tambour (guitar technique) =

Tambour (also called tambor, tamboro or tambora, written in music as tamb.), is a technique in Flamenco guitar and classical guitar that emulates the sound of a heartbeat. The player uses a flat part of the hand, usually the side of the outstretched right thumb, or also the edge of the palm below the little finger, and sounds the strings by striking them rapidly just inside the bridge of the guitar. Duration can be from a single articulation to an extended drum roll-like tremolo. If performed incorrectly, the effect is similar to a right-hand apagado, or dampening of the strings. Variation in tone can be achieved by striking different distances from the bridge and using different parts of the thumb (especially fleshy vs. bony parts). Variation in chord texture can be achieved by selecting different strings to strike.

== Examples ==
An example of tambour in popular music occurs at the beginning of the second verse of Your Time Is Gonna Come by Led Zeppelin.

One of the most remarkable modern compositions for the guitar, Sonata op.47, by Argentine composer Alberto Ginastera, was inspired by the folk music of Indians and Argentinean Gauchos and uses a lot of effects typical of the guitar, such as tamboro.

Both tambour and pizzicato can be heard in Aconquija by Barrios.
