= Gaita zuliana =

Venezuelan music style

Gaita zuliana (often simply called "gaita") is a style of Venezuelan folk music (and dance) from Maracaibo, Zulia State. Dating as far back as the 1800s, gaitas began as improvised songs in the neighborhoods of Zulia where, as Robert T. Carroll describes, “people would gather in a circle and encourage each other to make up verses to a song." Gaita incorporates various instrumentations and rhythms from Spanish, Indigenous and African music. According to Joan Coromines, it may come from the word "gaits," the Gothic word for "goat", which is the skin generally used for the membrane of the furro drum. Other instruments used in gaita include maracas, cuatro, charrasca and tambora.

The style became popular throughout Venezuela in the 1960s, and it fused with other styles such as salsa and merengue in the 1970s. It is not to be confused with the gaita escocesa, also known simply as gaita, which is Spanish for bagpipes. This is a very distinctive genre, very strongly sung, with the chorus sung by several singers, and with local rhythms, this genre is the distinctive genre of Christmas in Venezuela.

Although gaitas are most commonly heard around Christmas time, there are various themes present, ranging from romance to political. These various themes serve, as Nava Ibeth puts it, as a way for the Zulians to express themselves. This notion is also corroborated by Robert Carroll’s study in how lyrics present in gaitas serve as a retelling of the history of Zulia, which are viewed through the perceptive of its writers. For instance, the lyrics “‘thus began the history/ of my people’s gaita/ because when that black man sang it/ he gave us his inheritance and memory” in the song “Historia de la gaita” (History of the gaita) mention how gaita originated from a slave. Another example of this is “Sentir Zuliano,” (Zulian Feeling) a gaita that, according to Robert Carroll, expresses a sentimental, poetic description of what it means to, as the name implies, “feel Zulian.” Other examples include “Lago de Maracaibo” (Lake of Maracaibo) which refers to the oil boom in Venezuela during the 1960s with lyrics such as “Tus riquezas petroleras al mundo tiene asombrado.” (Your oil riches amaze the world).

Gaitas and politics have gone hand in hand for many years. For instance, during the Presidency of Carlos Andres Perez, the gaita song “Un ojo dimos” (roughly translated to ‘We sacrificed an eye’), the lyrics depict how despite the sacrifice the people of Venezuela had to do in order to elect Perez as president, Perez only introduced laws that would benefit the political elite. When Hugo Chavez became president of Venezuela, Gran Coquivacoa’s “Loco Chavez” (Crazy Chavez) includes lyrics such as “yet we see here/that if we speak about madmen/lots of people are now following the nation’s madman” in which Coquivacoa expresses his concern for what Chavez’s presidency would do to the country.

Famous gaita groups include Cardenales del Éxito, Rincón Morales, Estrellas del Zulia, Barrio Obrero, Gran Coquivacoa, Saladillo, Universidad de la Gaita, Koquimba, Melody Gaita, and Maracaibo 15. The group Guaco started as a gaita group but now plays a unique and distinct style of music influenced by European-Spanish and Afro-Caribbean rhythms. An important singer involved in Gaita Zuliana music is Ricardo Aguirre, "El Monumental de la Gaita" or the Monumental Artist of the Gaita.

Trinidad and Tobago has adopted gaita with some variation, calling it parang.
