= United Talmud Torahs of Montreal =

United Talmud Torahs of Montreal – Herzliah High School
- בתי תלמוד תורה / הרצליה

Location
- 4840 St. Kevin Ave. / 5475 Mountain Sights Ave. Montreal, Quebec; Canada; 45.4898°N 73.6317°W; 45.4875°N 73.6340°W

Information
- Type: Private Jewish day school
- Motto: Educating the leaders of tomorrow.
- Religious affiliation: Judaism
- Established: 1896; 130 years ago
- Principal (ATT): Sheri Nudel
- Principal (Herzliah): Claudine Habre
- Assistant Head of School: Arielle Medalsy
- Head of school: Michelle Toledano
- Grades: K–11
- Language: English, French, Hebrew
- Affiliation: CAIS, QAIS, AJDS, FEEP
- Website: azrieli-tth.ca

United Talmud Torahs of Montreal (Hebrew: הַמְאוּחָדִים בְּמוֹנְטְרִיאָל בָּתֵי תַלְמוּד תוֹרָה, French: Talmud Torahs Unis de Montréal) (also known as The Azrieli Schools, in French: Les écoles Azrieli) is a private co-educational Jewish day school system that includes an elementary school, United Talmud Torah, and a high school, Herzliah High School (Hebrew: בֵּית סֵפֶר הַתִיכוֹן הֶרְצְלִיָה). Both are located in the Snowdon neighbourhood of the Côte-des-Neiges–Notre-Dame-de-Grâce borough in Montreal, Quebec.

Herzliah and United Talmud Torah's campus in the Saint-Laurent borough (known as the Beutel campus) was closed down and consolidated with the Snowdon campus in 2011. Two additional elementary school campuses existed in the Côte Saint-Luc neighbourhood and Chomedey, but were closed down and merged with the other branches.

== History ==
Canada's first Talmud Torah school was founded in Montreal in 1896 by Rabbi Aaron M. Ashinsky of Congregation B'nai Jacob. Starting with twenty children in a small building on Cadieux Street (now de Bullion Street), it rapidly grew to 150 pupils in three years and moved to larger facilities at 401 de la Gauchetière Street. Classes initially were taught in Yiddish and, by 1917, in Hebrew.

The first class had but twenty students, all of them boys (girls were first admitted in 1911), and one teacher. The original Talmud Torah School, under the directorship of Rabbi Hirsch Cohen, moved again to larger quarters on Saint Urbain Street in 1903. Between 1905 and 1916 five additional Talmud Torahs emerged throughout the city. These institutions operated as supplementary Jewish schools that met for several hours a week, in the afternoons, evenings, or on Sundays.

In 1917, through the initiative of local philanthropist Sir Mortimer B. Davis, the six individual Talmud Torah schools amalgamated as the United Talmud Torahs of Montreal. Ground was broken in 1930 for the first new building of the school, financed by a fundraising initiative with major community support; the building was erected on the corner of Saint Joseph Boulevard and Jeanne-Mance Street in the Mile End neighbourhood with over 1,300 pupils enrolled. The United Talmud Torah Schools successfully initiated full day schools in the 1930s.

A high school, called Herzliah after Theodor Herzl, was opened in 1946 in new a building on Esplanade Avenue. Its first principal was Leon Kronitz, a graduate of the Kletsk Yeshuva, the Tarbuth Teachers' Seminary in Vilna, and McGill University. Its first classes were held with Melech Magid, who had been a teacher and principal with the United Talmud Torah schools since the early 1920s, as the full-time Educational Director.

In 1959, a new campus on Saint Kevin Avenue in the Snowdon district was opened, with the Saint Joseph Boulevard building closing shortly afterwards. In 1962, an elementary school opened in the town of Saint-Laurent, and a high school shortly thereafter. The Beutel campus in St. Laurent (both high school and elementary) was closed and merged with the Snowdon campus in 2011, because of increasing financial problems and decreasing enrolment. A merger of the United Talmud Torah–Herzliah schools with JPPS–Bialik, another Jewish school system and long the primary competitor with UTT–Herzliah, was announced in February 2011, but was soon rejected.

In 2016, Herzliah and the Talmud Torah elementary school were renamed The Azrieli Schools in recognition of the Azrieli Foundation's $15-million donation towards the building of a new high school campus. Herzliah moved to a new campus on Mountain Sights Avenue in 2018, next to the Montreal YM-YWHA. The campus was named in honour of Sylvan Adams, who made a $15-million contribution to the $20-million endowment established as part of the project.

== Arson in the elementary school library ==
United Talmud Torah library after attack

On April 5, 2004, a few hours before the beginning of Passover, a fire was set in the UTT St. Laurent campus' library. Approximately 15,000 books, along with all of the library's furniture and computers, were destroyed in the fire, causing more than $600,000 in damages. The perpetrators left a note on the school door and contacted a local TV station, stating their attack was in retaliation for Israel's assassination of Hamas leader Sheikh Ahmad Yassin.

Sleiman El-Merhebi and Simon Zogheib were later charged with arson and conspiracy. El-Merhebi pleaded guilty to arson in January 2005 and was sentenced to 40 months in prison in exchange for prosecutors dropping a conspiracy charge. Police charged Rouba El-Merhebi Fahd, the boy's mother, for acting as an accessory after the fact because she tried to arrange for her son to leave the country and go to Brazil after the attack. She was convicted in 2008 and served 12 months probation. Charges against Zogheib were dropped due to insufficient evidence in October 2004. A court-ordered reporting ban limits available information on the case against Zogheib.

=== Response ===
Prime Minister Paul Martin responded to the attack, saying "we must utterly condemn this cowardly and racist act and draw together to fight such an abomination." Jean Charest, the Premier of Quebec, called the arson intolerable. "Burning a school is in itself a vile act, because it touches the future of our society, but when it is done in the name of racism and intolerance, every Quebecer must stand up and denounce it to ensure this never happens again," he said in a statement. Irwin Cotler, who is a graduate of United Talmud Torahs, also responded to the incident, saying "anti-Semitism is not something new to me. But this kind of racist hate, this kind of violence, an attack of this nature, that was never something that we could have contemplated at that time as students." The Canadian Library Association published a special issue of School Libraries in Canada devoted to the tragedy. HarperCollins, Random House and other leading publishers have donated books to rebuild the UTT library.

Donations from across Canada, the United States and Israel helped to rebuild the library which reopened in December 2004, named the Azrieli Library in honour of Stephanie Azrieli, UTT's school librarian from 1975 to 1985. Further funds went into improving the safety and security of the school, with the installation of exterior lights, a new fire alarm and a security camera system. In accordance with Jewish law, on November 30, the remnants and ashes of some 250 library books burned in the fire were buried in a Jewish cemetery in Dollard-des-Ormeaux.

== Academics ==
In the 2007 Fraser Institute Quebec secondary school rankings, Herzliah Snowdon's English section was tied with Collège Jean-Eudes and Collège Jean-de-Brébeuf for top high school in the province. In 2008, the Ministry of Education of Quebec announced that Herzliah High School ranked first among English private high schools with a 100% graduation rate. In 2018, Herzliah was ranked 77th in the province (out of 452) by the Fraser Institute.

== Notable people ==
- Bernard Avishai (1949– ), writer
- Danna Azrieli (1967- ), a real-estate developer, and philanthropist.
- Stephanie Azrieli, former librarian of the St. Laurent elementary school
- Adam Braz (1981– ), former soccer player and former Technical Director of Montreal Impact
- Irwin Cotler OC (1940– ), human rights lawyer and former Justice Minister
- Leonard Cohen CC (1934–2016), poet, singer, and novelist
- Jacques Distler (1961– ), physicist
- Tooker Gomberg (1955–2004), activist for environmental causes.
- Ariel Helwani (1982– ), MMA journalist
- Goldie Hershon (1941– ), activist
- Anthony Housefather (1971– ), Liberal MP and Former Mayor of Côte Saint-Luc
- Charles Krauthammer (1950–2018), columnist and physician
- Jonah Keri (1974– ), baseball writer
- Irving Layton CC (1912–2006), poet
- Robert Libman (1960– ), politician and architect
- Lazarus Phillips OBE (1895–1986), lawyer and senator
- Norman Spector (1949– ), Chief of Staff to Brian Mulroney
- Hugh Segal OC (1950–2023), politician
- Dov Yosef (1899–1980), Israeli politician and statesman
- Moses Znaimer (1942– ), Canadian broadcasting pioneer
