= Danna Azrieli =

Israeli real estate developer and philanthropist

- דנה עזריאלי
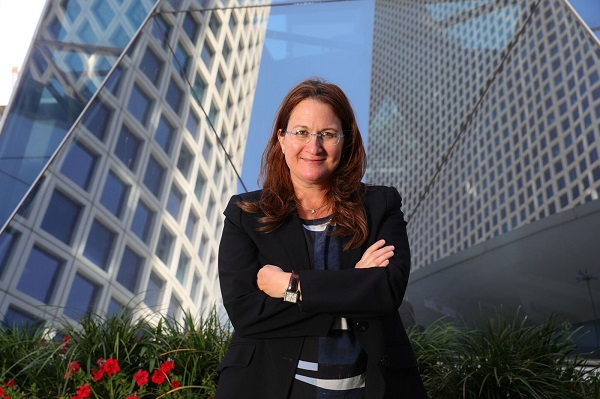
- Born: 3 June 1967; Montreal, Canada
- Education: Swarthmore College (BA); Vermont Law School (Juris Doctor (JD))
- Occupations: Real-estate developer and philanthropist
- Spouse: Danny Hakim
- Father: David Azrieli
- Family: Sharon Azrieli (sister)

Danna Azrieli Hakim (Hebrew: דנה עזריאלי; born 3 June 1967; Montreal, Canada) is an Israeli real-estate developer, and philanthropist. Azrieli has been the CEO of Azrieli Group, a publicly real estate company in Israel, since 2026, and had served as its chairperson from 2014 to 2026. Azrieli is also chairwoman of the Azrieli Foundation (Israel), and a member of the Azrieli Foundation (Canada), and a board member of the Weizmann Institute of Science, Tel Aviv University, and the Darca schools. She has an estimated net worth of US$2.9 billion in 2026, according to Forbes. Additional industries the company expanded into under Azriel's leadership include rental housing, hotels, and residential real estate

== Early life and education ==
Azrieli was born in Montreal, Canada, the youngest daughter of Stephanie Lefcort Azrieli and David Azrieli, Canadian real estate developer. Azrieli has a brother and two sisters, including Sharon, a soprano singer and cantor.

Azrieli attended Herzliah High School and holds a BA in Sociology and Anthropology, from Swarthmore College in 1990, and a Juris Doctor (JD) from Vermont Law School, in 1993.

== Career ==
Upon immigrating to Israel in 2000, Azrieli worked at Gornitzky & Co. until 2002 when she joined the Azrieli Group, a company founded by her father. It is known for developing shopping malls and office buildings in Israel. She led the diversification of Azrieli Group's assets into senior housing and data centers from its traditional focus on shopping centers and office towers.

Before appointed as chairwoman of Azrieli Group, Azrieli worked at the family's real estate business arm in the United States, Canpro Investment Ltd. From 2006, Azrieli was a director of Granite HaCarmel, and of its subsidiaries, Tambour, Sonol, Supergas and GES. Azrieli was appointed as deputy Chairwoman of the Azrieli Group in 2010, when the company went public. She went on to act as Chairwoman of the Azrieli group in 2014 and was officially appointed to the role following her father's death in July of that year. Danna Azrieli became acting CEO in 2025, and was permanently appointed to the position in February 2026.

Azrieli and her sisters inherited about 46 percent of the Azrieli Group after their father died in 2014.

From 2014 to 2021, the company increased its market capitalization from NIS 12 billion to a value of NIS 37 billion. In this time, Azrieli Group built the Azrieli Sarona Tower, a skyscraper in Sarona neighborhood, Tel Aviv. the Palace Senior housing projects and other projects across Israel including Rishonim, Ramla Mall, in Holon, and Azrieli Town in Tel Aviv. In 2016, Azrieli Group launched an Omnichannel ecommerce website, azrieli.com. Danna Azrieli facilitated the movement of the data center business, which has been the driving force of the company in recent years. The company entered into the data center field in 2019 when it acquired 24% of the US-based company Compass Holdco for $200 million. In July 2021, the group purchased the Norwegian company Green Mountain Data Centers for NIS 2.8 billion. The company entered other new sectors, the company's real estate interests were diversified further to include the hotel sector and rental housing market. In September 2026, Azrieli was included in Calcalist's "100 Most Influential People."

== Philanthropy ==
As Chairwoman of the Azrieli Foundation (Israel), and a member of the Canadian Azrieli Foundation, Azrieli supports a range of education programs, universities, research institutes, medical centers and hospitals. In 2004, she founded the Azrieli Empowerment Program that supports over 4000 at-risk middle school students across Israel. The program is managed by Darca Schools, where Azrieli is a board member. The Azrieli Foundation committed NIS 110 million to support the Empowerment Program and has recently donated another NIS 10 million for the "ELA" Educational Leadership Accelerator program.

In 2018, Azrieli was the Israeli chair of the General Assembly of the Jewish Federation Annual Meeting in Israel. Azrieli spearheaded Tel-Aviv University's 2019 Architect Competition, as part of the Azrieli Foundation's NIS 75 million commitment to establish the David Azrieli School of Architecture in the university. Azrieli sits on a number of boards including the International Board of Governors of the Weizmann Institute of Science, the Board of Governors of Tel Aviv University, and the board of the Holocaust Claims Conference, which promotes Shoah education and research and provides grants to organizations that assist Holocaust survivors around the world. She is also known for speaking about her father, who was a Holocaust survivor.

== Books ==
- Azrieli, Danna (2001). One Step Ahead: David J. Azrieli (Azrylewicz) : Memoirs 1939–1950. Jerusalem: Yad Vashem.
