= Basque lullaby =

Cradle song by Florence Hoarse

A Basque Lullaby is a lullaby written by Florence Hoare and published in The American Song Book: A Collection Of Songs And Hymns For Use In Schools And Homes in 1917.

The lyrics are:

Lullaby, Twilight is spreading
silver wings over the sky
Fairy elves are softly treading,
folding buds as they pass by
Lullaby, whisper and sigh
Lullaby, lullaby

Lullaby, daytime is weary,
tired of work, tired of play
Sleep, my baby, sleep, my dearie,
now you are as tired as they
Lullaby, whisper and sigh
Lullaby, lullaby

Lullaby, deep in the clover,
drones the bee softly to rest,
Close, white lids, your dear eyes over,
Mother's arms shall be your nest
Lullaby, whisper and sigh,
Lullaby, lullaby

The lyrics were recently set to a new, original melody by composer Dan Forrest who also wrote a choral arrangement of the piece. Forrest's composition was published by Hinshaw Music in 2006.
