= Requiem for the Living =

2013 choral composition in five movements by Dan Forrest

- Sacred vocal music by Dan Forrest
- Text: Parts from Requiem
- Language: Latin
- Performed: March 2013
- Movements: 5

Requiem for the Living is a choral composition in five movements by Dan Forrest, completed in 2013, an extended setting of the Requiem, scored for boy soprano, soprano, tenor, choir and orchestra. The Latin text that Forrest set combines sections from the Requiem with biblical texts from Ecclesiastes and the Book of Job. The composition was published by Hinshaw Music, including versions for smaller instrumental groups. It has been performed internationally.

== History ==
Forrest composed Requiem for the Living on a commission from the Hickory Choral Society in North Carolina, conducted by Don Coleman, for the occasion of the choir's 35th anniversary. It was first performed in March 2013. The work was published by Hinshaw Music. It has been frequently performed in the U.S. and abroad.

== Structure and scoring ==
Requiem for the Living is an extended setting of the Requiem, with slightly changed text, and scored for boy soprano, soprano, choir and orchestra. The large orchestra uses a harp and is rich in percussion. Two other versions for a reduced instrumental ensemble are available.

Forrest took some parts from the Requiem mass, however arranged in different order, and added a movement, Vanitas Vanitatum, as the second movement:

1. Introit – Kyrie
2. Vanitas Vanitatum
3. Agnus Dei
4. Sanctus
5. Lux Aeterna

The first movement uses the traditional text Introit and Kyrie from the Requiem. The second movement deals with the transience of everything living, based on texts in Latin not usually part of the Requiem which has a Dies irae section instead. Vanitas Vanitatum combines texts from two Biblical sources: Ecclesiastes and the Book of Job. It is set dramatically by rhythms and surprising turns. A reviewer found the music reminiscent of the Organ Symphony by Camille Saint-Saëns.

The third movement is Agnus Dei, normally found towards the end of a Requiem, and requesting the Lamb of God to grant mercy and eternal rest. It is the first movement to feature a soprano soloist, for a specific human touch. The fourth movement, Sanctus, which is often found in the center of a Requiem setting, is in ternary form. The text "Pleni sunt caeli et terra gloria tua" (Heaven and Earth are full of your glory) is set to music inspired by images taken from the Hubble Space Telescope, and the imagination of a city full of life. The final movement, Lux Aeterna (Eternal light), also includes text from the Gospel of Matthew, "Come unto me, all ye that labour" (Matthew 11:28–29) was set before by Handel in Messiah, and can be sung by a tenor solo.

In most movements, long melodies often begin mysteriously and soft and develop towards a brilliant ending. A single singer would not be able to hold their breath for the duration of the long phrases, but by using staggered breathing, a choir can create the impression of endless melodies.

== Performances and recordings ==
Requiem for the Living was recorded in 2013 by the Bel Canto Company, with soloists boy soprano Donovan Elliott, soprano Lindsey McConville Gallagher and tenor Jeremy Whitener, conducted by Welborn Young. It was performed by the same group at the 39th workshop for sacred choral music, sponsored by Hinshaw Music, at Chapel Hill, North Carolina, in 2013.
