= AMIT =

American Jewish volunteer organization

AMIT Children Inc.
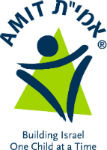
- Founded: May 10, 1925; 101 years ago
- Founder: Bessie Gotsfeld
- Type: 501(c)(3) nonprofit organization
- Tax ID no.: 13-5631502
- Headquarters: New York City, New York
- President: Audrey Axelrod Trachtman,
- Chair, Board of Directors: Suzanne Doft
- Chair, Board of Governors: Hattie Dubroff
- Affiliations: AMIT Israel
- Revenue: $9,731,950 (2013)
- Expenses: $9,027,254 (2013)
- Endowment: $200,000
- Employees: 37 (2013)
- Volunteers: 47 (2013)
- Website: amitchildren.org
- Formerly called: Mizrachi Women's Organization of America, American Mizrachi Women, Amit Women

AMIT is an American Jewish volunteer organization providing Jewish values–based education to 40,000 children in Israel. AMIT operates 87 schools across 29 cities.

The AMIT Network was selected by Israel's Ministry of Education as the leading Jewish educational network across all measurements, including quality bagrut, pedagogical innovation, pluralism and bridging the gap, lowest dropout rate and integrity.

AMIT has raised bagrut scores across the reshet (“network”), and it has significantly increased the number of students studying math, physics, science and technology subjects at the highest levels. AMIT graduates maintain a high level of military service or national service (95%), and they enter the army and the workforce equipped to meet the challenges of the 21st century.

AMIT maintains a balance of 70% of its schools in Israel's periphery (disadvantaged areas) and 30% in the more affluent center of Israel. When new schools are admitted to the network, this balance is maintained. On June 14, 2020, they have organized a Virtual Tour of Israel where they have presented the first National Mother-in-Israel.

== History ==
AMIT was founded on May 10, 1925, by Bessie Gotsfeld, and was then known as the Mizrachi Women's Organization of America. It officially incorporated on October 2, 1930. As early as 1934, AMIT was resettling young people from Europe in Mandatory Palestine. By the years immediately following the end of the war in Europe, AMIT participated in the resettlement of thousands of children, many of them orphans, who survived the Holocaust.

The Holocaust survivors were followed by the large influx of Jews from North Africa and the Arab countries in 1948–49, when AMIT dealt with the pressing needs of tens of thousands of newly arrived immigrant children.

In 1981, AMIT was designated by the Israeli government as its official Reshet (network) for religious secondary technological education.

== AMIT today ==
AMIT operates 108 schools, youth villages, surrogate family residences and other programs, constituting Israel's only government-recognized network of religious Jewish education incorporating academic and technological studies. AMIT students boast an 85% (bagrut) matriculation rate, exceeding the national average of 70% among Israeli Jewish students. More than 95% of its graduates enlist in the Israel Defense Forces or perform national service.

== List of AMIT schools ==
.

=== Acco ===
- AMIT Rambam Religious Elementary
- AMIT Kennedy Junior and Senior High School

=== Afula ===
- AMIT Yehuda Junior and Senior High School And Yeshiva
- AMIT Yeshivat Hesder

=== Ashdod ===
- Yeshivat AMIT Ashdod
- AMIT Mekif Bet Ashdod
- AMIT Mekif Yud Ashdod
- Midreshet Be'er Ashdod

=== Ashkelon ===
- AMIT Fred Kahane Technological School

=== Beersheva ===
- AMIT Wasserman Junior and Senior High School
- Dina and Moses Dyckman Ulpanat AMIT
- AMIT Daisy Berman Yeshiva
- AMIT Elaine Silver Technological High School
- AMIT Rambam Elementary School
- AMIT Afikim B'Negev Elementary School
- AMIT Torani Madai Netivei AM Elementary School
- AMIT Or Hammer Elementary School
- Neot Avraham Elementary School

=== Beit Shemesh ===
- AMIT Schachar Junior and Senior High School for Girls
- AMIT Dvir Junior and Senior High School for Boys
- AMIT Bellows Ulpanat Noga

=== Giv'at Shmuel ===
- Ulpanat AMIT Giv'at Shmuel

=== Haifa ===
- AMIT Anna Teich Ulpanat Haifa

=== Hatzor HaGlilit ===
- AMIT Hatzor Hagilit Junior and Senior High School
- AMIT Honi HaMe'agel Elementary School for Girls
- AMIT Shevet Sofer Elementary School for Boys

=== Jerusalem ===
- AMIT Frisch Beit Hayeled
- Midreshet AMIT (a midrasha - Torah Study for women)
- AMIT Nordlicht Religious Technological School
- AMIT State Technological High School
- Reishit Yerushalyim Elementary School

=== Karmiel ===
- AMIT Karmiel Junior and Senior High School

=== Kiryat Malachi ===
- AMIT Kiryat Malachi Junior and Senior High School
- AMIT Etzion Elementary School
- AMIT Harel Elementary School
- AMIT Netzach Israel Elementary School

=== Ma'ale Adumim ===
- AMIT Junior and Senior High School for Boys
- AMIT Wasserman Torah, Arts, and Sciences Junior and Senior High school for Girls
- AMIT Tzemach HaSade Elementary School
- AMIT Sde Hemed Elementary School
- AMIT Yaffe Nof Elementary School

=== Mateh Yehuda ===
- AMIT Even Ha Ezer Elementary School
- AMIT HaElah Elementary School
- AMIT Lavi Elementary School
- AMIT Matityahu Elementary School
- Yeshivat AMIT Nachshon

=== Meitar ===
- AMIT Chemdat Elementary School

=== Modi'in ===
- AMIT Modi'in

=== Netanya ===
- AMIT Bar Ilan High School
- AMIT Rambam Religious Elementary School

=== Or Akiva ===
- AMIT Atidim Junior and Senior High School
- AMIT Ofek Technological High School
- AMIT Rothschild Elementary School
- AMIT Etzion Religious Elementary School
- AMIT Rabbi Akiva Religious Elementary School
- AMIT Nechamia Tamari Elementary School
- AMIT Hannah Senesh Elementary School

=== Petach Tikvah ===
- AMIT Kfar Blatt Youth Village
- AMIT Wurzweiler Agricultural and Technological High School
- Yeshivat AMIT Eliraz High School
- Yeshivat AMIT Kfar Ganim
- AMIT Junior College
- Yeshivat HaHEsder Orot Shual Petach Tikva
- AMIT Menorat HaMaor Haredi Track

=== Ra'anana ===
- AMIT Renanim Junior and Senior Science and Technology High School for Girls
- AMIT Kfar Batya Youth Village
- AMIT Gruss Agricultural and Technological School and AMIT Schiff Junior High School
- AMIT Bienenfeld Hevruta Yeshiva and Kollel
- AMIT Gwen Straus Junior and Senior Science High School for Boys and Yeshiva Track
- AMIT School of Society and Law
- AMIT Noam

=== Ramat Gan ===
- AMIT Ginsburg Bar Ilan Gush Dan Junior and Senior High School for Boys

=== Ramle ===
- AMIT Ramle Technological High School

=== Rehovot ===
- AMIT Gould Junior and Senior High School for Girls
- AMIT Hammer Junior and Senior High School for Boys
- Yeshivat AMIT Amichai

=== Rosh Pina ===
- AMIT Pre-Army Religious Studies Program (Mechina)

=== Sderot ===
- AMIT Sderot Religious Junior and Senior High School
- Ulpanat AMIT Shirat
- AMIT Sderot Gutwirth Junior and Senior High School
- AMIT HaRoeh Elementary School
- AMIT Torani Mada'i Elementary School
- AMIT Torani Chadash Elementary School
- Yeshivat Hesder of Sderot, AMIT Track

=== Shoham ===
- AMIT Beatrice and Irving Stone Meysharim School

=== Tel Aviv ===
- AMIT Eisenberg Junior and Senior High School for Girls

=== Tzfat ===
- AMIT Florin Taman Junior and Senior High School for Boys
- AMIT Tzfat Junior and Senior Yeshiva Track
- AMIT Florin Taman Junior and Senior High School for Girls
- AMIT Tzfat Evelyn Schreiber Junior and Senior Ulpana High School Track

=== Yerucham ===
- Kamah School
- AMIT Kol Yaakov Elementary School
- Midreshet Be'er Yerucham
- Yeshivat AMIT B'levav Shalem

== Archival materials ==
The American Jewish Historical Society received a large donation of archival material and photographs related to AMIT and the organization's projects in Israel. The collection was minimally processed over the Summer 2011 and is available for research.

Photographs and materials relating to the Baltimore chapters' history are archived at the Jewish Museum of Maryland and can be viewed through their online collections.

== See also ==
- Education in Israel
- Ministry of Education (Israel)
- Religious Zionism § Educational institutions
- Other school networks recognized by the Ministry of Education:
  - Bnei Akiva
  - ORT
  - Tzvia
  - Darca
