= Sharon Azrieli =

Canadian soprano singer and cantor

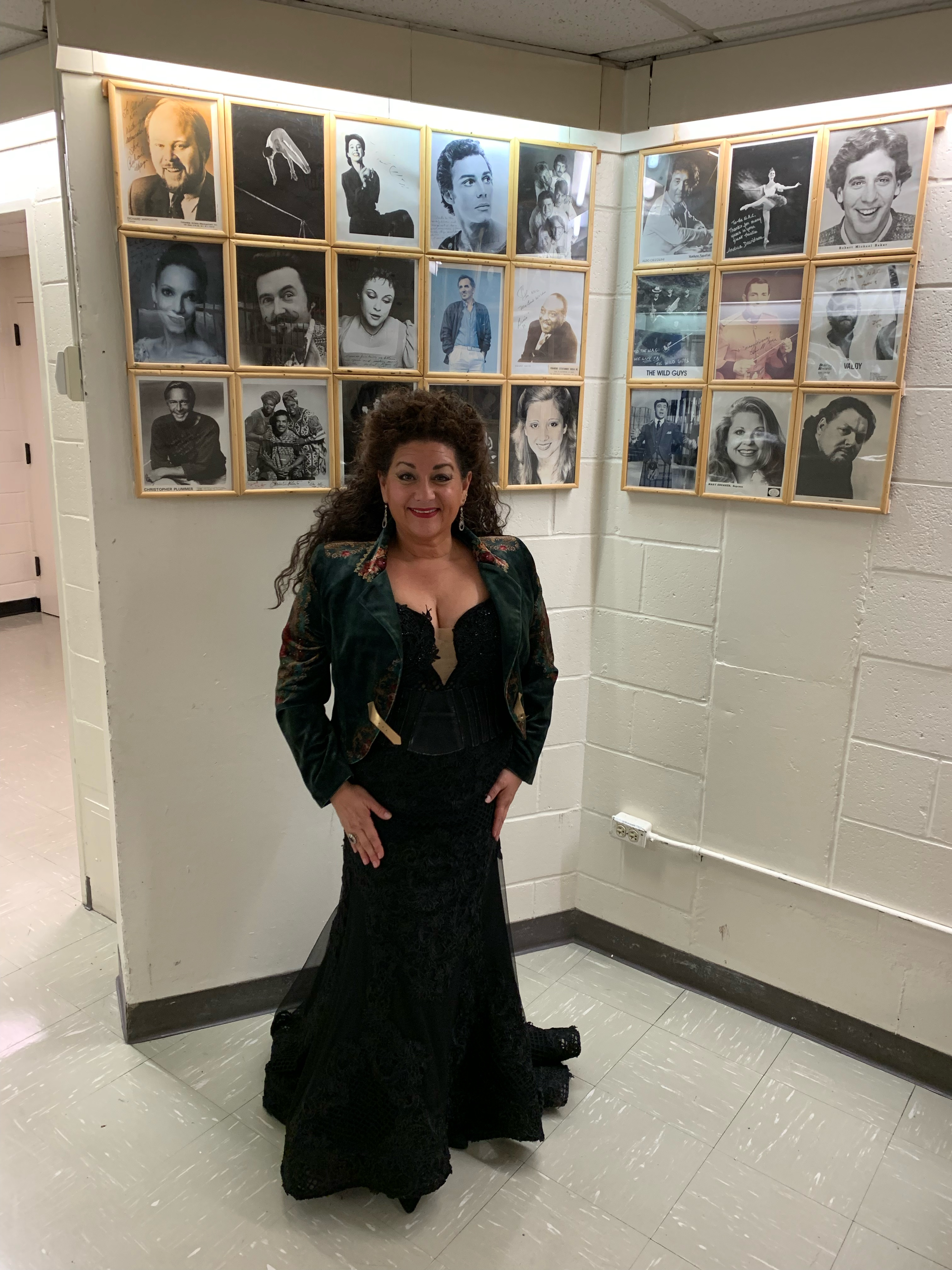
- Azrieli in 2019
- Born: Montreal, Quebec, Canada
- Education: Vassar College (AB) Parsons School of Design (AAS); Juilliard School (Adv Cert Vocal Perf) l'Université de Montréal (MA, DMus)
- Occupations: Cantor, singer
- Family: Naomi Azrieli, Danna Azrieli
- Awards: Chevalière of the National Order of Quebec
- Website: sharonazrieli.com

Sharon Azrieli is a soprano singer and cantor from Montreal, Quebec. She moved to New York City after attending Vassar College, from which she graduated with a degree in Art History. She also holds degrees from Parsons School of Design, Juilliard School, and the University of Montreal.

Azrieli performs classical, operatic, and musical theatre works, playing parts such as Juliette in Charles Gounod's Roméo et Juliette, Mimi in La Bohème and Susanna in Le Nozze di Figaro. She has performed with the Tokyo Symphony Orchestra, the New Israeli Opera, and the Canadian Opera Company at well-known venues including Carnegie Hall, the Metropolitan Opera, and l’Opéra Bastille de Paris.

Azrieli has recorded many albums in a variety of genres, including classical, jazz, and musical theatre. She has also appeared in movies and has worked as a Cantorial soloist.

== Early life and education ==
Azrieli was born in Montreal, Quebec to Canadian architect, philanthropist and Holocaust survivor, David Azrieli. Azrieli moved to New York City after attending Vassar College, where she graduated with a degree in Art History, and an Associate Degree in Illustration from the Parsons School of Design. While studying illustration she got a Diploma in Vocal Performance under Ellen Faull at the Juilliard School, where her mentors included Joan Dornemann, Principal Prompter at the Metropolitan Opera and the late Herbert Breslin. Joan Dornemann invited her to attend her Vocal Arts Institute in Israel over three successive summers where she performed several leading roles, including Norina in Don Pasquale and Musetta in La Bohème. In 2006, Azrieli obtained a Master of Music degree in Vocal Performance from the Université de Montréal, and in 2011 a Doctorate in Music from the same university.

== Professional work ==
Azrieli became a student of Bill Schuman, a teacher who had previously worked with Celine Dion and Aprile Millo and currently teaches at the Academy of Vocal Arts in Philadelphia. With Schuman's help, Azrieli primed her voice for Verdian soprano roles. Azrieli performed Leonora in Il trovatore and Aida. She performed the roles of the prioress in Dialogues des carmélites and Leonora in La Forza del Destino with One World Symphony Orchestra.

Azrieli sang the role of La Gioconda in La Gioconda with the New Jersey Association of Verismo Opera and Mimi in La Bohème with the New Jersey Association and the Canadian Opera Company. She has performed at several major festivals, including Brott Music Festival in Hamilton, Ontario, and Festival Sefarad in Montreal.

In 1991, Azrieli performed the role of Laurette in Le Docteur Miracle with L’Opéra Français de New York. Andrew Porter, music critic for the New Yorker, praised Sharon Azrieli on her performance as Laurette.

In 1994, Azrieli performed the role of the chambermaid Susanna in Mozart's The Marriage of Figaro with Sarasota Opera.

Azrieli has, on numerous occasions, captured the eyes and ears of audiences at Carnegie Hall. Her first appearance at the world-renowned theater was in April 1996 for the Altamura/Enrico Caruso International Voice Competition, in which she performed Francesco Cilea's Adriana Lecouvreur: Act I. Io son l'umile ancella.

Azrieli enrolled at the Academy for Jewish Religion in New York and began her first job as a Cantor for Temple Adas Israel in Sag Harbor.

Azrieli and her sons moved back to Montreal in 2000, where she became a full-time cantor at Temple Emanu-El-Beth Sholom from 2001 until 2003.

While completing her D.Mus. at the Université de Montréal in 2011, she wrote her thesis on ethnomusicological links between the music of Giuseppe Verdi and ancient Jewish scales/modes.

On September 11, 2013, Azrieli sang in "It's Better with Music" a black-tie benefit for the McGill Chamber Orchestra. The benefit program featured baritone Étienne Dupuis performing the famous "Figaro" aria from The Barber of Seville. Azrieli performed arias and a duet from Verdi's La Traviata.

In 2014, Azrieli performed at the world premiere of The Esther Diaries, by Canadian composer Haralabos [Harry] Stafylakis, with the McGill Chamber Orchestra at the La Maison symphonique de Montréal. The one-woman show is about the Old Testament's Queen of Persia.

On April 8, 2015, Azrieli sang at the concert Song of Songs at Congregation Chevra Kadisha-B'nai Jacob with maestro Joseph Milo. She sang several vocal works at the concert, including Max Janowski's Avinu Malkeinu.

On November 28, 2015, Azrieli performed in a benefit concert for the Château Dufresne in Montreal. The concert featured her roles in arias by Mozart, Verdi and Puccini, as well as a world premiere of the score composed by Charles Gabriel Foignet in 1813, dedicated to Marie Louise, Empress of the French.

In 2015, Azrieli sang the song "When the Music Played" on the CD for the Broadway cast album Doctor Zhivago.

In 2016, she was the soprano soloist in Gabriel Fauré's Requiem, Op. 48 under conductor Alex Qian with the New England Symphonic Ensemble at Carnegie Hall.

In 2017, she performed twice at Carnegie Hall. Once in April, for the Opera Gala Honoring the Career of Tenor Giuseppe Giacomini under conductor Eve Queler and Members of the Opera Orchestra of New York. Secondly, in June for Dan Forrest's Jubilate Deo under conductor Tracey S. Resseguie and once again with the New England Symphonic Ensemble.

In September 2017, Azrieli performed with Pavel Feldman conducting the Centennial Youth String Orchestra. During the performance, Israel Bonds presented Azrieli with their Dor L’Dor ("from generation to generation" in Hebrew) Award for her artistry, commitment to local and Israel-based causes, and for being a role model as a philanthropist.

In 2018, Azrieli performed at the Metropolitan Opera as Sister Dolcina in Puccini's Suor Angelica. In May 2018, she performed with the Hebrew University Orchestra at the Jerusalem Theatre. The concert featured Mendelssohn's Symphony No. 3 in A minor, Op. 56, Deux mélodies hébraïques and Chanson Hébraique, and excerpts from Bizet's Carmen.

In 2019, she was awarded the National Order of Quebec (Chevalière du Québec) for her lifetime performance achievements.

Her 2019 performances include a performance at the National Arts Centre in Ottawa, singing Marcellina in Mozart's The Marriage of Figaro under conductor Alexander Shelley. She performed regularly in her hometown of Montreal with L'Orchestre Classique de Montréal under the late conductor Boris Brott. Azrieli also performed with L'Orchestre Métropolitain under Dutch conductor Vincent De Kort as part of the Violins of Hope concert, which featured restored violins previously owned by Holocaust victims and survivors.

Azrieli released two music albums, Sharon Azrieli Sings Broadway in 2019, and Frankly Sharon in 2020. Frankly Sharon features arrangements by Jason Howland, to compositions by Frank Wildhorn on piano, and Azrieli's own translation of most of the lyrics into French, Italian, and Hebrew.

In October 2021, she performed the compositions of the late composer Pierre Mercure as a soloist for the New York-based Talea Ensemble at the DiMenna Center for Classical Music. Of Azrieli's excerpt, Noémie Chemali from BlogCritics wrote:

"Dissidence by the late Canadian composer Pierre Mercure was next on the program with Sharon Azrieli as soprano soloist. I must say, this piece was a perfectly packaged little gem, short yet so full of contrasting emotions, keeping me on the edge of my chair throughout. This composition could not have been executed so perfectly without the poise of such an accomplished performer as Ms. Azrieli and the virtuosity of all of the players in the Talea Ensemble."

In June 2022, Azrieli performed with the musicians of the Orchestre Classique de Montréal under the baton of Geneviève Leclair for the Benefit Gala Celebrating the Life and Legacy of Maestro Boris Brott. In the following July, she performed and taught a masterclass in Athens and Syros, Greece, for the sixteenth Festival of the Aegean. In August, Azrieli toured five cities in South America with violinist Alexandre Da Costa and the Orchestre Symphonique de Longueuil. Concerts were held in Bogotá, Medellín, Porto Alegre, Rio de Janeiro, and São Paulo.

In October 2022, she performed the world premier of Aharon Harlap's Out of the depths have I cried unto Thee, O Lord, a suite of psalms set for voice and symphony orchestra at Maison Symphonique with the Orchestre Métropolitain under the direction of Alexandre Bloch.

In April 2023, Azrieli performed as Soprano with the Orchestre Classique de Montréal. She sang songs by Michel Legrand taken from her album, A Tribute to Michel Legrand, which was released in 2022. She played the role of Helen in the film Irena's Vow, which premiered at the Toronto International Film Festival on September 10, 2023.

In October 2023, Sharon Azrieli performed the European premiere of 2022 Jewish Music laureate Aharon Harlap's Out of the depths have I cried unto Thee, O Lord, for soprano and orchestra at Cadogan Hall.

In March 2024, Azrieli performed Aharon Harlap's Out of the depths have I cried unto Thee, O Lord at Alice Tully Hall with the Orchestra of St. Luke's, conducted by Steven Mercurio. It was the U.S. premiere of the works by the 2022 Azrieli Music Prizes winners.

In June 2024, Azrieli sang a selection of Jewish songs in different languages from various time periods in a recital honoring Jacob Israël de Haan in the Uilenburgersjoel in Amsterdam.

Also in June 2024, Azrieli performed at the Berlin Philharmonic alongside pianist Mikhail Shekhtman and cellist Arseniy Chubachin. She sang pieces by Tchaikovsky, Sol Zim and Bizet, in addition to a medley by Naomi Shemer.

On November 10, 2024, Azrieli performed with the Orchestre Philharmonique du Québec as part of the Violins of Hope concert. She sang Ladino songs and two songs by Quebecois composer Gilles Vigneault.

On February 14 and 16, 2025, Azrieli performed at Montreal's Maison Symphonique and the Grand Theatre de Quebec with Ensemble Caprice, under the direction of Matthias Maute.

In April 2025, Azrieli sang jazz standards at the Festival de la Voix Big Band, under the direction of Ron Di Lauro.

In May 2025, she sang excerpts from West Side Story and Candide at the Pierre-Mercure Hall with the Orchestre Classique de Montreal, conducted by Melanie Leonard.

In September 2025, she performed French 19th-century art songs accompanied by Meagan Milatz, piano, and Cameron Crozman, cello, for HausMusique: Cabaret in Montreal's Art Deco heritage venue, Le 9^{e} Grande Salle.

Azrieli sang Mendelssohn Psalm 42 with the Israel Symphony Orchestra as part of the Hatikvah (Hope) concert series from October 21–28, 2025, during which eleven different orchestras performed across Israel in eight cities.

In February 2026, Azrieli sang with L'Orchestre symphonique de Laval conducted by Adam Johnson. Also in February, Azrieli starred in SHARON! Mostly Canadian, a musical revue directed and choreographed by Warren Carlye. The show was presented by OpéraM3F at Montreal's 9^{e} Grande Salle.

== Film ==
Azrieli sang two songs on the soundtrack for the film SHEPHERD: The Story of a Jewish Dog, released in May 2021.

Azrieli sang the end credits title song of the Canadian film Stand!, which was released in December 2020.

In August 2020, Azrieli sang the song "Hurry! it's lovely up here" in the Hollywood film Stage Mother, starring Lucy Liu.

In 2021, Azrieli acted the role of Dina in the film Shttl. This film, about the destruction of a Jewish town during the Holocaust, was filmed in Ukraine prior to the 2022 Russian invasion. Set in 1941, it was filmed in black and white with flashbacks in colour, and performed in Yiddish.

In 2022, Azrieli performed the role of Helen in the film Irena's Vow. This film, directed by Canadian Louise Archambault, is the true story of Irena Gut, a Polish nurse who was awarded the Righteous Among the Nations medal for showing remarkable courage in her attempt to save Polish Jews during the Holocaust.

In 2024, Azrieli acted the role of Maxine in the comedy Wingman, starring Russell Peters.

== Home In Canada ==
Working alongside Editor-in-Chief Stephanie Whittaker and art director Randy Laybourne, Azrieli took over the Montreal, Vancouver and Toronto magazine Montreal Home in 2016. As the publisher of the new incarnation of Home in Canada, Azrieli wrote numerous articles on contemporary trends and influencers performing within the creative architectural ethos. She wrote articles about the Maison & Objet design show at the Paris Nord Villepinte Exhibition Centre and the architectural design of the Orient Jerusalem Hotel. Furthermore, Azrieli conducted interviews with Moshe Safdie, Karim Rashid, Frank Gehry, Tiffany Pratt, Mike Holmes, Rita Brianski and Chaki. After four successful years, the last issue of Home in Canada was published on Dec 1, 2020, during the COVID-19 pandemic. Despite the magazine no longer producing print copies, Dr. Azrieli continued to post her interviews on YouTube and other media streaming platforms.

== The Azrieli Music Prizes ==
Established by the Azrieli Foundation in 2014, the Azrieli Music Prizes (AMP) was the brainchild of Dr. Sharon Azrieli. Initially, upon its creation, the AMP offered two prizes,

"The Azrieli Prize for Jewish Music is awarded to a composer who has written the best new undiscovered work of Jewish music...The Azrieli Commission for Jewish Music is awarded to encourage composers to creatively and critically engage with the question, "What is Jewish music?" This prize is given to the composer who proposes a response to this question in the shape of a musical work that displays the utmost creativity, artistry, technical mastery and professional expertise."

For the 2020 rendition of the gala, the foundation added a third prize for Canadian music, "The Azrieli Commission for Canadian Music is offered to a Canadian composer to create a new musical work that creatively and critically engages with the complexities of composing concert music in Canada today."

Most recently, AMP has added a 4th prize, the International category. This new prize, the Commission for International Music, aims to foster greater intercultural understanding through music.

The inaugural AMP Gala Concert took place on October 19, 2016, and premiered the winning compositions by Brian Current and Wlad Marhulets. The AMP Jury Awarded the Azrieli Prize for Jewish Music to Marhulets for his Concerto for Klezmer Clarinet. The jury awarded the Azrieli Commission for Jewish Music to Current's newly created work, The Seven Heavenly Halls. The Montreal Symphony Orchestra accompanied both compositions under Maestro Kent Nagano's baton, with clarinetist Andre Moisan joining the orchestra for Marhulets Klezmar Concerto. The Gala Concert also featured an opening performance of excerpts from Gustav Mahler's Rückert-Lieder, no 1. "Blicke mir Nicht in die Lieder!" and no 2. "Ich atmet'einen linden Duft" sung by Sharon Azrieli.

On October 15, 2018, the AMP Gala Concert occurred at Maison Symphonique de Montréal and featured world premiers by laureates Kelly-Marie Murphy and Avner Dorman. The jury awarded Kelly-Marie Murphy the Azrieli Commission for Jewish Music for her piece En el escuro es todo uno (In the Darkness All Is One). Under the baton of guest conductor, Yoav Talmi L'Orchestre Classique de Montréal performed Murphy's piece with harpist Erica Goodman and cellist Rachel Mercer. In addition, the AMP Jury awarded Avner Dorman the Azrieli Prize for Jewish Music for his composition Nigunim. Featuring Canadian violinist Lara St. John, L'Orchestre Classique de Montréal, and conductor Yoav Talmi performed Dorman's Nigunim. The concert also featured a performance from soprano soloist Sharon Azrieli who sang Canadian composer Srul Irving Glick's Seven Tableaux from the Song of Songs.

The Czech National Symphony Orchestra opened its 2019/20 season performing the Czech debuts of works by 2018 Azrieli Music Prize winners Kelly-Marie Murphy and Avner Dorman.

On October 22, 2020, Lorraine Vaillancourt conducted Le Nouvel Ensemble Moderne for the AMP Gala Concert and the compositions submitted by the laureates. Held in the Salle Bourgie at the Montreal Museum of Fine Arts and live-steamed globally, the concert featured world premieres by Keiko Devaux, Yotam Haber, and Yitzhak Yedid. In addition to the laureates, the concert featured an arrangement of Québécois composer Pierre Mercure's Dissidence orchestrated by Jonathon Monro and sung by soprano soloist Sharon Azrieli. Keiko Devaux was awarded the Azrieli Commission for Canadian Music for her composition Arras, which was later awarded a Juno in 2021. Yotam Haber was awarded the Azrieli Commission for Jewish Music for his composition of Estro Poetico-armonico III, and Yitzhak Yedid was awarded the Azrieli Prize for Jewish Music for his Kadosh Kadosh and Cursed composition.

Under the Baton of Canadian conductor Alexander Bloch, the most recent AMP gala concert was held on October 20, 2022, at La Maison Symphonique with the Orchestre Métropolitain. The second edition of the Azrieli Commission for Canadian Music was awarded to Rita Ueda for her composition Birds Callin from the Canada in You. The Azrieli Commission for Jewish Music was awarded to Iman Habibi for his composition Shāhīn-nāmeh, based on texts by Judeo-Persian poet Shahin Shirazi. The Azrieli Prize for Jewish Music was awarded to Aharon Harlap for his piece, Out of the depths have I cried unto Thee, O Lord. Sharon Azrieli sang for Harlaps award-winning composition, accompanying a laureates piece for the first time at the AMP.

On October 6, 2023, New Jewish Music, Vol. 4 - Azrieli Music Prizes was released on Analekta. The album features the world-premiere recordings of the 2022 Azrieli Music Prizes Laureates Iman Habibi, Aharon Harlap, and Rita Ueda. New Jewish Music, Vol. 4 marks seven years of collaboration between Analekta and the Azrieli Music Prizes. In 2022, New Jewish Music, Vol. 3 received a JUNO Award.

On March 28, 2024, the compositions of the 2022 laureates were performed in a celebratory concert "Azrieli Music Prizes at 10: A New York Celebration" at New York's Alice Tully Hall at Lincoln Center. Sharon sang Aharon Harlap's Out of the depths have I cried unto Thee, O Lord. The concert featured the 2022 winners: Imam Habibi's Shāhīn-nāmeh in the New Jewish Music category and in the Canadian category, Rita Ueda's Birds Calling ... from the Canada in You.

The 2024 Azrieli Music Prize laureates are Yair Klarta, recipient of the Azrieli Commission for Jewish Music; Josef Bardanashvili, who received the Azrieli Prize for Jewish Music; Jordan Nobles, who received the Azrieli Commission for Canadian Music; and Juan Trigos, who won the inaugural Azrieli Commission for International Music.

== Sacred works ==
- Fauré, Requiem: New England Symphonic Ensemble, Carnegie Hall, New York
- Mozart, Requiem: Emeritus Orchestra, Tel Aviv
- Verdi, Requiem: New West Symphony and New Jersey State Opera at Ocean Grove
- Dvořák, Stabat Mater: University of Montreal
- Rossini, Stabat Mater: Haifa Symphony Orchestra
- Beethoven, Mass in C minor: Haifa Symphony Orchestra
- Bach, Saint John's Passion: The Atlanta Bach Choral

== Orchestral works ==
- Mahler: Rückert-Lieder, Montreal Symphony Orchestra
- Ravel: Deux mélodies hébraïques, McGill Chamber Orchestra
- Bernstein: Kaddish, Jerusalem Symphony Orchestra
- Beethoven: 9th Symphony, Jerusalem Symphony Orchestra, McGill Chamber Orchestra
- Mahler: 8th Symphony (2nd Soprano soloist), National Orchestra of Canada
- Bernstein: Songfest, Jerusalem Symphony Orchestra
- Puccini: Arias, Jerusalem Symphony Orchestra
- Ofer Ben-Amots and Tzvi Avni: modern works, Israel Chamber Orchestra
- Tchaikovsky and Rachmaninov: Songs, McGill Chamber Orchestra
- Mozart Concert: Arias, McGill Chamber Orchestra
- Houston Grand Opera: Duets and Arias, Tokyo Symphony Orchestra
- Mahler: 4th Symphony, L’Orchestre de l’Isle
- Barber: Knoxville: Summer of 1915, University of Montreal

== Operatic roles ==
- Norina: Don Pasquale, Gaetano Donizetti
- Leonora: Il Trovatore, Giuseppe Verdi
- Nedda: Pagliacci, Ruggero Leoncavallo
- Laurette: Le Docteur Miracle, Georges Bizet
- Juliette: Roméo et Juliette, Charles Gounod
- Mimì: La Bohème, Giacomo Puccini
- Manon Lescaut: Manon Lescaut, Giacomo Puccini
- Rachel: La Juive, Fromental Halévy
- Susanna: Le Nozze di Figaro, Wolfgang Amadeus Mozart
- Adriana (cover): Adriana Lecouvreur, Francesco Cilea
- Elvira: Don Giovanni, Wolfgang Amadeus Mozart
- Liù: Turandot, Giacomo Puccini
- Madame Lidoine: Dialogues des Carmélites, Francis Poulenc
- Leonora: La Forza del Destino, Giuseppe Verdi
- Aida: Aida, Giuseppe Verdi
- Sister Dolcina: Il Trittico, Giacomo Puccini

== Discography ==
- Sharon Azrieli Sings Canadian Musical Theatre
- Easily Assimilated: Ruby Sparrow Records
- Go to Sleep My Babies: Ruby Sparrow Records
- Three Concerts with Boris Brott: Ruby Sparrow Records
- New Jewish Music, Vol. 4 - Azrieli Music Prizes, Analekta
- Secret Places: A Tribute to Michel Legrand, LML Music
- New Jewish Music, Vol. 3 - Azrieli Music Prizes, Analekta
- Frankly Sharon, Time Life
- Rare French Arias of the 19th Century, Time Life
- New Jewish Music, Vol. 2 - Azrieli Music Prizes, Analekta
- The Gift of Joy, Time Life
- Sharon Azrieli Sings Broadway, Time Life
- New Jewish Music, Vol. 1 - Azrieli Music Prizes, Analekta
- Fiddler on the Roof 2018 Cast Recording (in Yiddish), Time Life
- Doctor Zhivago, Broadway Records
- Friday Night Live at Temple Emanu El
- A Few of My Favorite Sings
- You Make Me Feel So Young

== Philanthropy ==
Forbes currently estimates Azrieli’s wealth to be approximately $1.2 billion USD. She sits on the boards of directors for the National Arts Centre (NAC), McCord Museum, Canadian Vocal Arts Institute (CVAI), as well as for the Azrieli Foundation. Azrieli also serves as President Emeritus for the Orchestre Classique de Montréal (OCM) and as Chair of the Azrieli Music Art Culture Centre at the Azrieli Foundation. The Azrieli Foundation was established in 1989 and contributes to causes such as scientific and medical research, higher education, Holocaust education, youth empowerment, music and the arts, architecture, and quality-of-life initiatives for people with developmental disabilities in Canada and Israel.

Azrieli is Donor-in-Residence at Mécénat Musica, where her collaborative efforts have led to more than 50 donors contributing to 23 cultural organizations between 2016 and 2025.

In 2022, Azrieli created an immersive nine-month piano collaborative program run jointly by McGill University and the University of Montreal.

In November 2023, the Azrieli Music Prizes added an additional award category called the International Prize Awards. This prize asks composers to compose new music, from their lived experience, based upon their diverse cultural heritage.

The Azrieli Foundation launched the Azrieli Music, Arts and Culture Centre (AMACC) in September 2023. The center improves access to arts experiences across Canada.

In the fall of 2024, Azrieli created The Hatikva Project concerts, a series of 18 concerts performed over five days in 11 Israeli cities to mark one year since the October 7 Hamas terrorist attack. The concerts were held October 30 through November 3, in Haifa, Kibbutz Dorot, Beersheba, Ashkelon, Ashdod, Ra'anana, Netivot, Modiin, Karmiel, Jerusalem, and Tel Aviv. The following orchestras participated in the project: the Israel Philharmonic with conductor Lahav Shani, the Jerusalem Orchestra East West with Tom Cohen, the Ra'anana Symphonette, the Jerusalem Academy of Music and Dance, the Rishon Lezion, Beersheba and Haifa orchestras, the Andalusian Ashdod, and several youth orchestras.
