= 2022 Maccabiah Games =

21st edition of Jewish multi-sport event

21st Maccabiah
- Host city: Jerusalem, Israel
- Nations: 58
- Athletes: 10,000
- Events: 42
- Opening: July 14, 2022
- Closing: July 25, 2022
- Opened by: Isaac Herzog
- Torchbearers: Linoy Ashram; Artem Dolgopyat
- Main venue: Teddy Stadium

The 2022 Maccabiah Games (Hebrew: משחקי המכביה 2022) took place in Israel from July 14–25, 2022, and are also referred to as the 21st Maccabiah Games (Hebrew: המכביה ה-21). The Maccabiah Games are open to Jewish athletes from around the world, and to all Israeli citizens regardless of their religion. Israeli former Olympic judo medalist Arik Zeevi served as Maccabiah Chairman. Approximately 10,000 athletes from 80 countries competed in 42 sports categories. The 21st Maccabiah Games were originally scheduled for 2021, but were postponed and held in 2022 due to the global COVID-19 pandemic.

== History ==
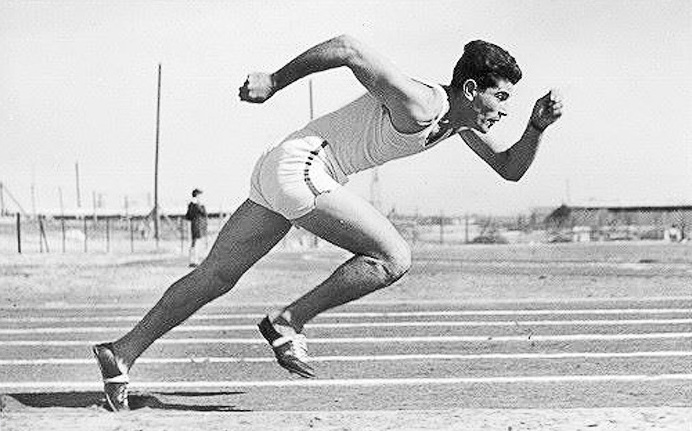
A sprinter at the 1st Maccabiah Games in 1932

The Maccabiah Games were named for ancient Jewish warrior Judah Maccabee from the village of Modi'in, who led the Maccabean Revolt against the Seleucid Empire from 167 to 160 BCE. They were first held in 1932. In 1961, the Games were recognized as Regional Games by the International Olympic Committee. The Games are overseen by Maccabi World Union.

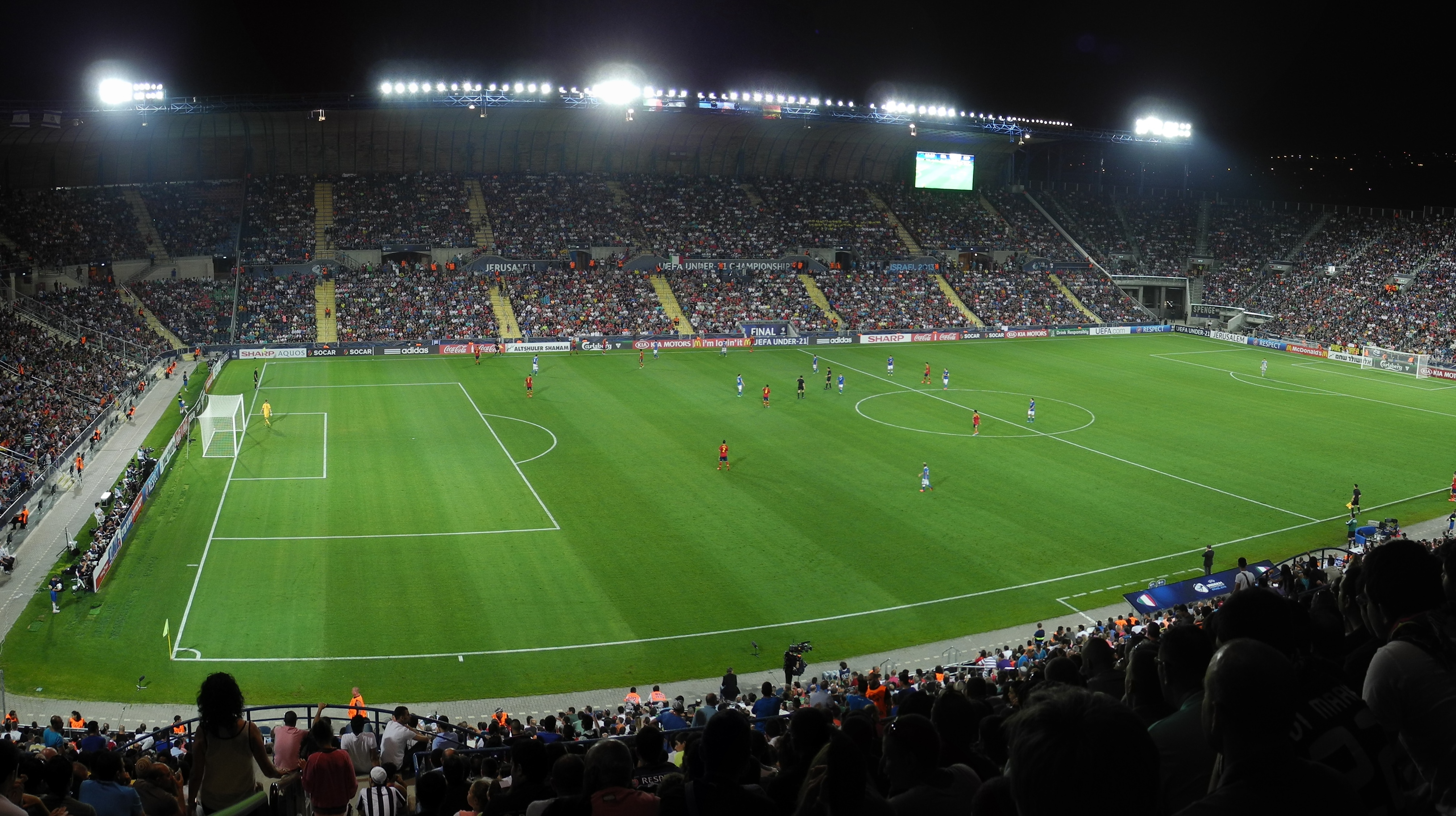
Teddy Stadium in Jerusalem

Among other Olympic and world champions, swimmer Mark Spitz won 10 Maccabiah gold medals before earning his first of nine Olympic gold medals. The Games are the second-largest sports gathering in the world, by number of participants. At the 2017 Maccabiah Games, the nations that won the most medals were Israel, the United States, Australia, Canada, and Hungary.

== Opening ceremony ==
The opening ceremony took place on July 14, 2022, at Teddy Stadium in Jerusalem, Israel, which was also designated as the "Capital of the Maccabiah" for the Games. Israeli gymnasts and Olympic champions Linoy Ashram and Artem Dolgopyat lit the ceremonial torch at the opening ceremony. Torches were carried by Tokyo Olympic taekwondo medalist Avishag Semberg; swimmer Anastasia Gorbenko; paralympic swimmers Mark Malyar and Arab-Israeli Iyad Shalabi, and Jewish-American-Israeli Olympic and major league baseball player Ian Kinsler. Israeli pop singers Eden Ben Zaken and Static & Ben El Tavori performed.

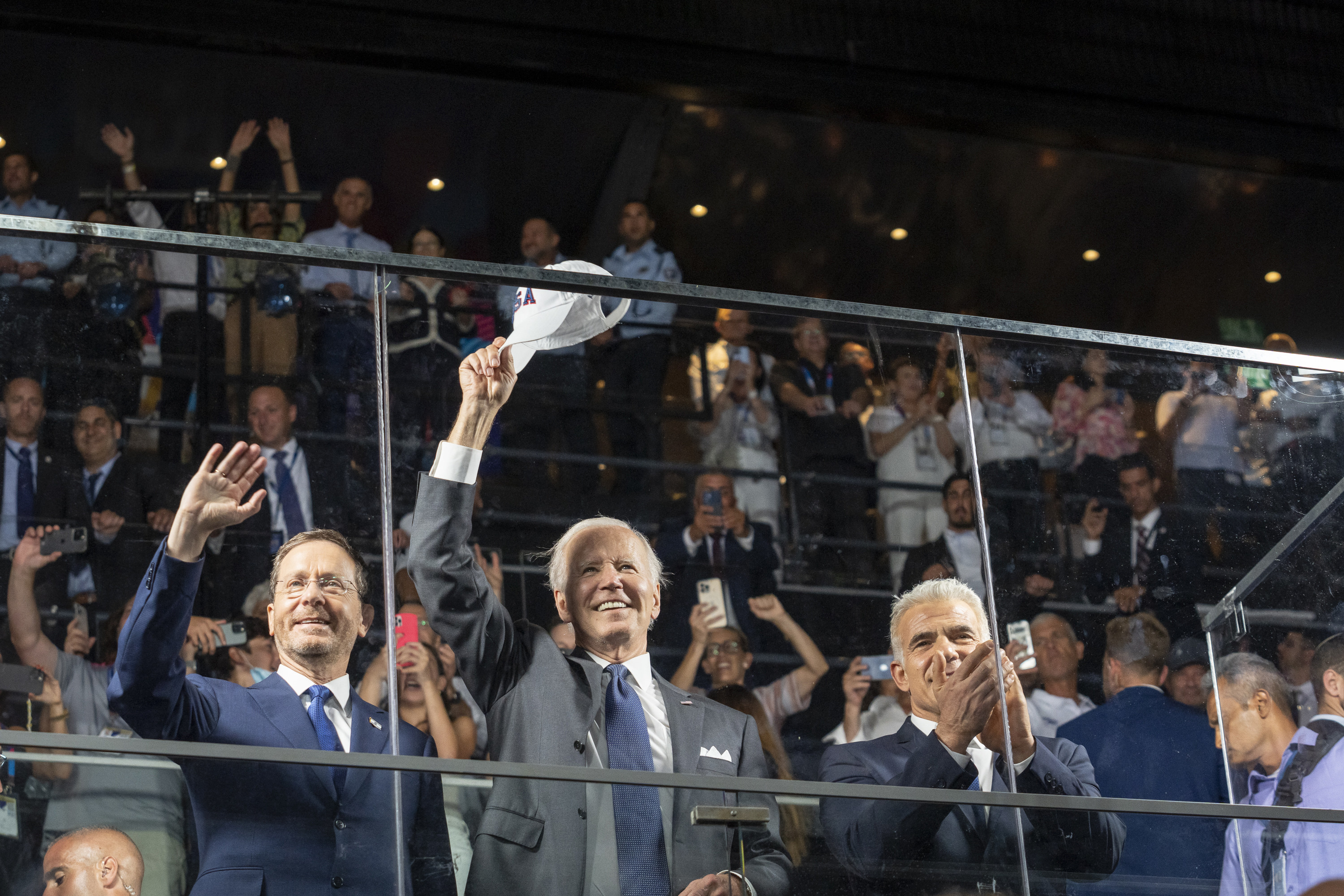
US President Joe Biden, together with President Isaac Herzog and Prime Minister Yair Lapid, at the opening ceremony of the 2022 Maccabiah Games.

United States President Joe Biden attended the opening ceremony, cheering on the US delegation of 1,400 athletes—larger than the US delegation to the 2020 Summer Olympics. He said to them: "I’m so damn proud of you... Godspeed and go get ‘em, guys." He became the first American president to attend the Maccabiah Games.

== Notable competitors ==
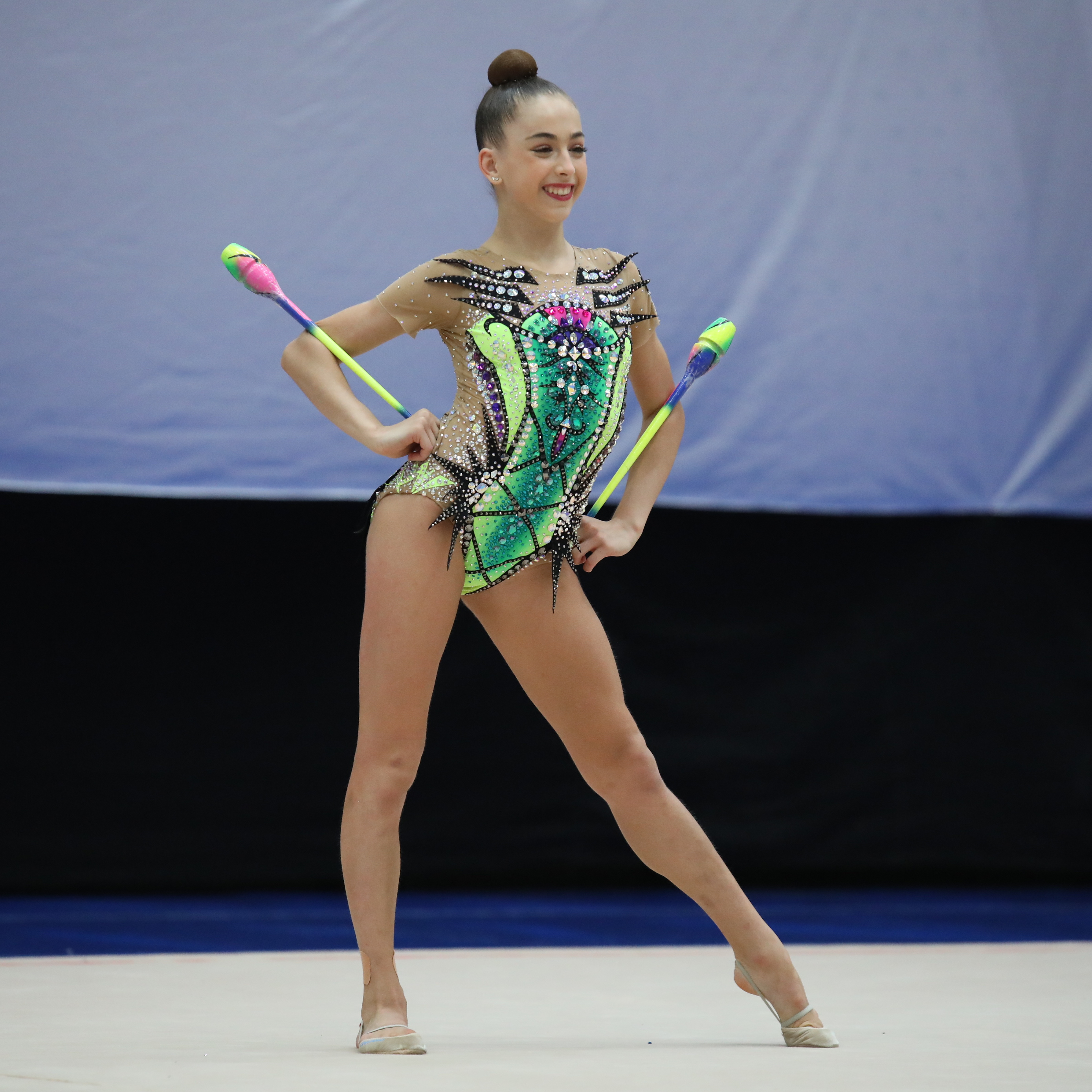
Israeli rhythmic gymnast Daria Atamanov, 2022 European All-Around Champion, at the 2022 Maccabiah Games.

Israeli Olympian and European Championships bronze medalist Lihie Raz swept the artistic gymnastics open women's events, winning six gold medals. World champion bronze medalist Andrey Medvedev was part of the Team Israel squad that won the gold medal in the open men's team. Australian rhythmic gymnast and future Olympian Alexandra Kiroi-Bogatyreva won five bronze medals.

In swimming, Israeli Olympian, two-time world champion, and national record holder Anastasia Gorbenko won the women's 200 m individual medley, Israeli Olympian, former European Junior Champion, and national record holder Yakov Toumarkin won the men's 200 m backstroke, and Israeli Olympian and national record holder Meiron Cheruti won the men's 50 m freestyle. Israeli Olympian and national record holder Gal Cohen Groumi won the men's 100 m butterfly; he was at the time a rising sophomore at the University of Michigan and finished 10th in the 100 fly at the 2022 NCAA Division I Championships. Israeli Olympian Michael Laitarovsky won the men's 100 m backstroke. Israeli Bar Soloveychik won a gold medal while breaking the record that had stood for 33 years in the 400 m freestyle.

Israeli Olympian Anat Lelior won the gold medal in women's surfing.

Olympic swimmer and national record holder Denis Petrashov of Kyrgyzstan won the men's 100 m breaststroke.

In badminton, Israeli Olympian Ksenia Polikarpova won a gold medal in women's doubles and a silver medal in women's singles, Israeli Yuval Pugach won a gold medal in mixed doubles and a silver medal in women's doubles, and Israeli Alexander Bass won a silver medal in men's doubles. Lithuanian Alan Plavin won bronze medals in men's singles and men's doubles.

In women's basketball, American Abby Meyers captained and won a gold medal with Team USA. In men's basketball, Spencer Freedman and Sam Iorio played for the gold medal-winning Team USA.

== Participating countries ==
The Maccabiah Games are open to Jewish athletes from around the world, and to all Israeli citizens regardless of their religion. The following countries (and number of athletes from each) are participating in the 2022 Maccabiah Games:

- Argentina (765; 3rd-largest delegation)
- Australia (600+)
- Azerbaijan
- Bahamas (8)
- Belgium
- Brazil
- Canada (700; 4th-largest delegation)
- Chile
- Colombia
- Costa Rica
- Cuba
- Czech Republic
- Cayman Islands (2)
- Estonia
- Finland
- France
- Georgia
- Germany
- Gibraltar
- Great Britain (527)
- Greece
- Honduras
- Hong Kong
- Hungary
- India
- Ireland (1)
- Israel (1,884; largest delegation)
- Italy
- Japan (1)
- Kazakhstan
- Kyrgyzstan
- Lithuania (17)
- Mexico
- Moldova
- Netherlands
- Panama
- Paraguay
- Peru
- Poland
- Puerto Rico
- Romania
- Serbia
- Singapore
- Slovakia
- South Africa
- Spain
- Sweden
- Switzerland
- Turkey
- Ukraine (45)
- Uruguay
- United States (1,334; 2nd-largest delegation)
- Venezuela
- Zambia (1)
- Zimbabwe (2)
- Maccabi Europe
- Maccabi World Union
- Olim

== Venues ==
The Games took place at venues in a total of 18 Israeli cities. The following are the venues of the Maccabiah events, and the events held at them, throughout the country:

- Ashdod
  - Ben Gurion Park – Cricket
- Caesarea
  - Caesarea Golf Club – Golf
- Daliyat al-Karmel
  - Darkha High School Sports Hall – Badminton
- Ganei Tikva
  - Lider Sports Center – Fencing
- Gezer – Softball
- Hadera
  - Enerbox Auditorium – Judo; Karate
- Haifa
  - Ben Tzvi Hall – Futsal U16 and U18
  - Ramat Alon Hall – Volleyball U16 and U18
  - Romema Arena – Basketball U16 and U18
- Jerusalem
  - Arnona Community Center – Youth Ice Hockey; Women's Ice Hockey
  - Givat Ram Stadium – Men's Football; Women's Football; Athletics
  - Israel Tennis Center – Tennis
  - YMCA Jerusalem – Weightlifting; Wheelchair Basketball
  - Pais Arena – Men's Basketball; Women's Basketball; Men's Futsal; Women's Futsal
  - Pisgat Ze'ev – Men's Volleyball; Women's Volleyball
- Netanya
  - Yeshurun Hall – Basketball 45+
  - Wingate Institute – Futsal 35+; Futsal 45+; Men's Rugby; Women's Rugby; Swimming; Water Polo
  - Shapira – Football 35+; Football 45+; Football 55+
  - Sharon Auditorium – Basketball 35+
  - Rigler Auditorium – Volleyball
- Petach Tikva
  - Rozmarin Hall – Netball
- Nof HaGalil
  - Green Stadium – Men's Football U18 and U16; Women's Football U16 and U18
- Ramat Gan
  - Maccabiah Village – Padel
- Ramat HaSharon
  - Tennis Center – Tennis 65+
- Ra'anana
  - Aviv Hall – Netball 16+; Netball 18+; Netball 35+
  - Moadon – Bowls
  - Metro West – Table Tennis
  - Squash Center – Squash
  - Ra'anana Park – Baseball
- Sharona
  - Horse Park – Dressage; Jumping
- Tel Aviv
  - Hadar Yosef National Sport Center – Artistic Gymnastics; Rhythmic Gymnastics
  - Velodrome Tel Aviv – Cycling

== Sports ==
Athletes at the Games are competing in 29 different sports, encompassing a total of 42 disciplines. Five new sports were added for the 2022 Maccabiah: 3×3 basketball, bouldering, surfing, motocross, and padel, and three new sports for women: ice hockey, football, and futsal. Pickleball was accepted as an exhibition sport at the Games.

- Aquatics
  - Swimming
  - Swimming (open water)
  - Water Polo
- Athletics
  - Half marathon
  - Track and field
- Badminton
- Baseball
- Basketball
  - Basketball
  - Basketball 3x3 (new)
  - Wheelchair basketball
- Bowling
  - Lawn Bowling
- Bouldering (new)
- Chess
- Cricket
- Cycling
- Equestrian
- Fencing
- Field Hockey
- Football
  - Football
  - Futsal
  - Beach Football (new)
- Golf
- Gymnastics
  - Artistic
  - Rhythmic
- Ice Hockey
- Judo
- Karate
- Netball
- Padel (new)
- Rugby
  - Rugby 7s
  - Rugby 15s
- Softball
- Squash
- Surfing (new)
- Table Tennis
- Tennis
  - Tennis
- Volleyball
  - Volleyball
  - Beach Volleyball
- Weightlifting (reintroduced)

== Closing ceremony ==
The closing ceremony took place on July 25, 2022, in Live Park in Rishon LeTzion. Singer Noa Kirel performed.

== See also ==
- Sport in Israel
