= Badminton at the 2022 Maccabiah Games =

- Venue: Darca School
- Location: Daliyat al-Karmel, Israel
- Dates: 17 - 19 July 2022
- Competitors: 45 from 5 nations

Badminton at the 2022 Maccabiah Games was held at the Darca School in Daliyat al-Karmel, Israel from 17 to 19 July 2022.

== Competition schedule ==
GS	Group stage	R16	Round of 16	¼	Quarterfinals	½	Semifinals	F	Final

Events	Sun 17	Mon 18			Tue 19	
Men's singles	GS	¼			½	F
Men's doubles		R16		¼	½	F
Women's singles	GS	¼			½	F
Women's doubles		R16		¼	½	F
Mixed doubles		R16	¼	½	F	

== Medals ==
=== Medal table ===
* Host nation (Israel)

Rank	Nation	Gold	Silver	Bronze	Total
1	Israel*	5	5	7	17
2	Lithuania	0	0	5	5
3	Brazil	0	0	1	1
3	Germany	0	0	1	1
Totals (4 entries)		5	5	14	24

Source: (Note: For mixed nationality doubles teams, the medals have been counted for both nations. Therefore, these entries may be skewed.)

=== Medalists ===
Event	Gold	Silver	Bronze
Men's singles	May Bar Netzer; Israel	Idan Schneidman; Israel	Alan Plavin; Lithuania
Men's singles	May Bar Netzer; Israel	Idan Schneidman; Israel	Ariel Shainsky; Israel
Women's singles	Heli Neiman; Israel	Ksenia Polikarpova; Israel	Alina Bergelson; Israel
Women's singles	Heli Neiman; Israel	Ksenia Polikarpova; Israel	Anna Kirilova; Israel
Men's doubles	Israel; May Bar Netzer; Maxim Grinblat	Israel; Alexander Bass; Lior Kroitor	Lithuania; Mark Sames; Daniel Tarachovskij
Men's doubles	Israel; May Bar Netzer; Maxim Grinblat	Israel; Alexander Bass; Lior Kroitor	Maayan Mugilner; Israel; Alan Plavin; Lithuania
Women's doubles	Israel; Alina Bergelson; Ksenia Polikarpova	Israel; Margaret Lurie; Yuval Pugach	Zohar Amoyal; Israel; Amanda Feldman; Brazil
Women's doubles	Israel; Alina Bergelson; Ksenia Polikarpova	Israel; Margaret Lurie; Yuval Pugach	Emily Mostovoy; Germany; Vitalija Movsovic; Lithuania
Mixed doubles	Israel; Yuval Pugach; Ariel Shainsky	Israel; Maxim Grinblat; Anna Kirilova	Israel; Gal Hiram; Heli Neiman
Mixed doubles	Israel; Yuval Pugach; Ariel Shainsky	Israel; Maxim Grinblat; Anna Kirilova	Margaret Lurie; Israel; Mark Sames; Lithuania
