= Azrieli Foundation =

The Azrieli Foundation is a Canadian charitable foundation that supports initiatives across Canada and Israel. It was established in 1989 by David Azrieli, who also founded the Azrieli Group, Israel's leading real estate company. David Azrieli's daughter, Naomi Azrieli, is the Chair of the Foundation, while all three sisters, including Danna Azrieli, serve on the board of the Azrieli Group.

The Azrieli Foundation is Canada’s largest, non-corporate philanthropic foundation, and maintains funding priorities across multiple sectors, including education, science, healthcare, and the arts.

== Finances ==
The Azrieli Foundation holds 12.7% of the shares in the Azrieli Group holdings. As of 2023, the Azrieli Foundation held CAD 2.47 billion in assets. In May 2023, the Foundation donated NIS 180 million to Darca Network, which operates schools in the occupied Golan Heights. Following October 7, 2023, the Foundation allocated CAD 10 million in emergency funds to support Israelis affected by the October 7 attacks, and in February 2025, it stated that it had committed CAD 20 million to assist first responders and hospitals, provide medical equipment and trauma support to those affected by the attacks.

== Areas of activity ==
The Azrieli Foundation is a major donor to the arts in Canada, with significant contributions to the Art Gallery of Ontario, the Toronto Symphony Orchestra, and the Giller Prize. In 2024 and 2025, the Foundation also funded the $10,000 Breakthrough Artist Award of the Toronto Arts Foundation (TAF). TAF and the Azrieli Foundation’s funding agreement came to an end in March 2026, following a two-year campaign by artists and arts workers protesting the Azrieli Foundation being “resourced by the gains from ongoing colonisation, occupation and displacement in Palestine.” In April 2026, the Giller Prize also confirmed the end of its sponsorship ties to the Azrieli Foundation, as of 2025. Heather Sherman, the Azrieli Foundation's director of communications, stated that "It was not ended because of pressure from activist groups. In fact, we remain open to new opportunities to collaborate in the future.”

== Corporate governance ==
=== Azrieli Foundation Canada Board Directors ===
As of January 2026:

- Naomi Azrieli, Chair
- André Beaulieu, CEO
- Sharon Azrieli
- Linda Frum
- Amir Gissin
- Danny Hakim
- Peter A. Singer
- Franco Vaccarino
