= Dan Forrest =

American composer, pianist, educator, and music editor

- Born: January 7, 1978 (age 48); Breesport, New York, U.S.
- Education: Bob Jones University, University of Kansas
- Occupations: Composer, Pianist, Educator
- Employer(s): Freelance Composer, Beckenhorst Press
- Known for: Choral/Orchestral Composer
- Website: http://www.danforrest.com/

Daniel Ernest Forrest Jr. (born January 7, 1978) is an American composer, pianist, educator, and music editor.

== Biography ==
Dan Forrest was born in Breesport, New York, and began piano lessons with his elementary school music teacher Joanne Snyder (Horseheads, NY) at age 8. In high school Forrest studied piano with Frances McLaren (Elmira, NY) and won numerous piano awards, accompanied honors choirs, and performed the Grieg Piano Concerto with the Elmira Symphony. He majored in piano at Bob Jones University, earning a B.Mus. and an M.Mus. in Piano Performance, studying advanced theory and composition with Joan Pinkston and Dwight Gustafson. After teaching piano in South Carolina for three years, he moved to Kansas, where he earned a D.M.A. in composition from the University of Kansas, studying with wind band composer James Barnes. Forrest also studied with Alice Parker, whom he counts as a foremost influence. Forrest's compositions include choral, instrumental, orchestral, and wind band works. His music appears in the catalogs of numerous publishers, primarily Beckenhorst Press (church music) and Hinshaw Music (concert music), but also Choristers Guild. In 2018, he began self-publishing his own concert music The Music of Dan Forrest, which is distributed by Beckenhorst Press. His published works have sold millions of copies worldwide.

Forrest's choral works have received the ASCAP Morton Gould Young Composer's Award, the ACDA Raymond Brock Award, a Meet The Composer grant, the University of Kansas Cius Award, the ALCM Raabe Prize. Forrest's music has been performed in leading venues around the world including Carnegie Hall, the Lincoln Center, NPR's Performance Today, and on the BBC Proms. A review in The Salt Lake Tribune referred to Forrest's "superb choral writing" and gave as an example his arrangement of "The First Noel," which it said was "full of spine-tingling moments." Forrest is one of a small number of composers whose works have been included in both Teaching Music Through Performance in Choir and Teaching Music Through Performance In Band. Perhaps Forrest's best known work is Requiem for the Living (2013), having received several hundred performances worldwide. His other major works, Jubilate Deo (2016), LUX: The Dawn From On High (2018), the breath of life (2019), and CREATION (2023) have also been widely performed. His Dona Nobis Pacem was commissioned by the Brunello and Federica Cuccinelli Foundation and premiered in Solomeo, Italy in June 2026.

Forrest has impacted and mentored a large segment of other 21st century choral composers through various educational endeavors. He taught music theory and composition at The University of Kansas as a graduate assistant from 2004 to 2007, and at Bob Jones University from 2007 to 2012, where he served as chairman of the department of music theory and composition. He then began working for Beckenhorst Press, where he now serves as editor to dozens of living choral composers, Vice President of Publications, and collaborative pianist for all Beckenhorst Singers recordings and concerts (with millions of streams on digital music platforms). Forrest organized and taught at annual workshops and mentoring programs for composers for more than a decade through the John Ness Beck Foundation before launching his own composer mentoring program, Forrest Fellows, in 2026. He also served as chair of the National ACDA Composition Initiatives Committee from 2020-2024. He regularly teaches composition lessons and masterclasses, and speaks about composing, music-making, aesthetics, music publishing, and the music business in guest-artist residencies with universities and choirs in the United States and abroad.

Forrest also currently serves as Composer-in-Residence at Furman University and Artist-in-Residence at Mitchell Road Presbyterian Church, Greenville, SC.

== Style ==
Forrest is equally at home in both concert music and church music, and he composes for ensembles across the spectrum of choral music. His background in academia and experience with professional choirs and orchestras allows him to write complex music that requires sophisticated performers, yet he also writes music accessible for amateur choirs. He is known for his skill in writing melodic lines for all voices and instruments, which he attributes to studying with Alice Parker and James Barnes. His choral works are known for their sensitivity to the nuances, speech rhythms, and deeper meanings of their texts. Additionally, his skill as a pianist and his training and experience in instrumentation/orchestration result in accompaniments that are known for their idiomatic writing and effective, impactful, and efficient scoring.

== Awards ==
- 2004 John Ness Beck Foundation, first place (with noted composer John Rutter taking second place). His winning composition was a choral setting of "The King of Love My Shepherd Is."
- 2005 American Choral Directors Association Raymond Brock Composition Competition. His winning piece, "Selah," was premiered at the ACDA convention in 2006.
- 2006 ASCAP Morton Gould Young Composers Award for selected movements from Words From Paradise, an extended work for a cappella choir. He was presented his award at the Lincoln Center.
- 2009 John Ness Beck Foundation, first place.
- 2009 Raabe Prize, endowed for the Association of Lutheran Church Musicians by William and Nancy Raabe, for his In Paradisum.
- 2009 Frank Ticheli International Wind Band Composition Contest, Finalist.
- Numerous other awards from composition contests, musical societies (Forrest was inducted into Delta Omicron musical society in 2015), honorary memberships, etc.
- 2027 American Choral Directors Association Raymond Brock Memorial Commission. Dan is the first composer to win the Brock Student Award, then go on to eventually receive the Brock Commission, ACDA's most prestigious award for composers.

== Notable performances ==
- On February 11, 2007, Forrest's music was performed in Carnegie Hall for the first time, with the world premiere of "Arise, Shine!" His works are now performed there on a regular basis.
- On Christmas Day 2008, National Public Radio featured Forrest's "Carol of Joy" on Performance Today.
- On March 24, 2013 Forrest's "Requiem for the Living" was premiered as a commissioned work by The Hickory Choral Society, in honor of the organization's 35th anniversary.
- In spring 2016, Forrest's Jubilate Deo was premiered as a commissioned work by the Indianapolis Children's Choirs, in honor of founder Henry Leck's retirement.
- In 2016, Forrest was commissioned by Duke University Chapel to arrange "The Church's One Foundation" for the re-opening of the Chapel after rehabilitation of its limestone ceiling and replacement of its roof.
- In fall 2017, Forrest's LUX: The Dawn From On High was premiered as a commissioned work by the Greenville Chorale and Symphony, conducted by Bingham Vick, Jr.
- In September 2019, Forrest's setting of "And Can It Be?" was performed on the last night of the 2019 BBC Proms series, in the Northern Ireland Proms in the Park concert.
- In October 2019, Bel Canto Company, Greensboro, NC, premiered Forrest's the breath of life.
- In late 2019, Forrest toured the Netherlands for three concerts with Choir Project Opus, for performances of his Requiem and Jubilate Deo in three cities, culminating in a performance in the Concertgebouw in Amsterdam.
- Hundreds of other commissioned premieres include Himenami (in Izumi Hall, Osaka, Japan) Non Nobis Domine (in Salzburg Cathedral, Austria, July 2018).
- In fall 2023, the Wayne Oratorio Society premiered Forrest's CREATION oratorio in Philadelphia, PA.
- In fall 2025, Forrest's None Other Lamb was commissioned for the closing service of the 2025 BBC Proms series at Holy Sepulcher Church in London.
- In June 2026, Forrest's Dona Nobis Pacem was premiered in Solomeo, Italy, sponsored by the Brunello and Federica Cuccinelli Foundation, conducted by Fabio Ciofini.
- In October 2026, two portions of Forrest's Jubilate Deo were chosen for performance at the Pope's visit to Paris, with an audience of 80,000 in the Stade de France. The music was sung by a choir of over 2000, and accompanied by fireworks over the stadium.
- In November 2026, Forrest's Good Night, Dear Heart was performed as part of the annual UK Festival of Remembrance in Royal Albert Hall, London, with King Charles and members of the royal family in attendance.

== Works ==
- Requiem for the Living (2013)
- Jubilate Deo (2016)
- LUX: The Dawn from on High (2018)
- the breath of life (2019)
- CREATION (2023)
- Dona Nobis Pacem (2026)
- Hundreds of other smaller works

== Personal life ==
Forrest is married and has three children. He is a Christian and views his musical work as an outgrowth of his faith.
