= Danny Hakim (philanthropist) =

Australian-Israeli philanthropist, filmmaker and activist

Danny Hakim OAM
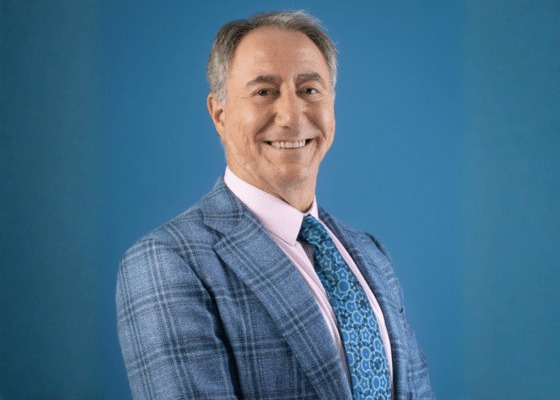
- Born: Adelaide, Australia
- Education: University of New South Wales; Swinburne University
- Occupations: Philanthropist and social entrepreneur
- Spouse: Danna Azrieli

Danny Hakim (Hebrew: דני חכים) is an Australian-born philanthropist, martial arts champion, and social entrepreneur. He is the founder of Budo for Peace and Honorary president of the Israeli Paralympic Committee.

== Early life and education ==
Hakim was born in Adelaide to Egyptian Jewish parents, before moving to Sydney with his family. He discovered karate thanks to his grandmother buying him karate lessons for as a bar mitzvah present. Hakim has a B.Sc. in Biotechnology from the University of New South Wales, Sydney and a Masters in Entrepreneurship and Innovation from Swinburne University, Melbourne. He made Aliyah in 2003.

== Karate ==
Hakim represented Australia, Israel and Japan in different international karate competitions and is a two-time world Karate silver medalist. In 1983, Hakim traveled to Japan to train under karate master Hirokazu Kanazawa. He is a nana-dan, which is the seventh degree of black belt, and is the only person living in Israel to have accomplished this.

== Career ==
Hakim is the founder and chairman of Budo for Peace, an organization that uses the martial arts to help bring down barriers and foster peace. He is also the founder of Sports for Social Impact which works on unlocking the positive social potential of sports.

Hakim is the producer of films Shadya, Marathon Mom, and Rabbi Capoeira.

Hakim is on the board of ALLMEP, Kids Kicking Cancer, Maccabi World Union, the Israeli Surf Lifesaving Foundation, the Azrieli Foundation and the Psik Theatre in Jerusalem. He is the chairman of the Australia Asia Desk of Maccabi World Union.

In February 2025, he was appointed Honorary president of the Israeli Paralympic Committee. In 2025, Hakim founded Women’s Champions for Change.

== Awards ==
In 2017, Hakim was inducted into the Maccabi NSW Hall of Fame. In 2018 Budo for Peace was awarded the Regional NGA of the Year by Peace and Sport. Hakim was awarded the 2019 Bonei Zion Prize for Culture, Arts & Sports. In January 2022, Hakim was presented with an Order of Australia medal for services to the international community.

== Personal life ==
Hakim is married to Danna Azrieli and has two children. He is an independent contributor, publishing a series of articles and commentaries through his personal platform for the Times Of Israel.
