= Pinhas Rubin =

Israeli lawyer (born 1949)

- פנחס רובין
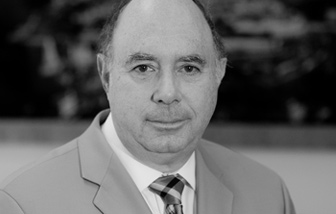

Personal details
- Born: 1949 (age 76–77) Kfar Glikson, Israel
- Occupation: Lawyer

Pinhas Rubin (Hebrew: פנחס רובין; born 1949) is an Israeli lawyer and chairman of Gornitzky & Co., one of the largest law firms in Israel.

He is the firm chairman and a senior partner at Gornitzky & Co.
