= Jubilate Deo (Forrest) =

2016 sacred choral composition by Dan Forrest

- Choral composition by Dan Forrest
- Text: Psalm 100
- Language: Latin; Hebrew; Arabic; Mandarin Chinese; Zulu; Spanish; English
- Performed: 2016: Indianapolis
- Scoring: soloists; four-part choir (SATB); optional treble choir; orchestra

Dan Forrest's Jubilate Deo is a sacred choral setting of Psalm 100 in seven languages, divided in seven movements. It was first performed in April 2016 in the last concert of the Indianapolis Children's Choir conducted by its founder and artistic director Henry Leck. The extended composition for two soloists, choir and orchestra has been performed internationally.

== History ==
Forrest composed Jubilate Deo on a commission from the Indianapolis Children's Choir, to be performed in its last concert with its founder and artistic director Henry Leck in April 2016. He set the text of the popular Psalm 100 in seven languages, forming seven movements. He scored it for soprano and alto soloists, a four-part choir (SATB, often fivided) and an optional treble choir, with versions for three different orchestra sizes. It was published in 2016 by Hinshaw Music.

== Structure ==
The work is structured in seven movements:

1. Jubilate Deo (Oh be joyful in the Lord), all verses in Latin
2. Ve adthdor vador (From age to age), verses 4–5 in Hebrew and Arabic
3. Ta cao chang de yang (The sheep of his pasture), verse 3 and Psalm 23:1 in Chinese
4. Ngokujabula! (With great rejoicing), verses 1–3 in Zulu
5. Bendecid su nombre, verse 4 in Spanish
6. Song of the Earth, humming
7. ... Omnis Terra!, repetitions from earlier movements, in Latin, English and Zulu
