= Gornitzky & Co. =

Israeli law firm

Gornitzky & Co. Advocates and Notaries
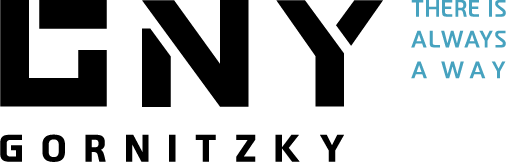
- Company type: Partnership (Israel)
- Industry: Law
- Founded: Tel Aviv, British Mandate of Palestine (1938)
- Headquarters: Tel Aviv, Israel and Herzlia Pituach, Israel
- Key people: Pinhas Rubin, Chairman; Moriel Matalon, Managing Partner; Zvi Ephrat, Senior Partner
- Products: Legal advice
- Revenue: Unknown
- Number of employees: 230
- Website: www.gornitzky.com

Gornitzky & Co., is a law firm in Israel. Its office is in Tel Aviv. The firm was established in 1938 by Israel Gornitzky. It is headed by Pinhas Rubin and co-managed by Lior Porat and Kfir Yadgar.

The firm represents major banks in Israel and abroad; investment companies; housing and construction companies; hi-tech and telecommunications companies; insurance companies; hotel and tourism companies. The firm has also represented the Israeli government.
