= Alan Plavin =

Lithuanian badminton player (born 1993)

Personal information
- Born: 2 June 1993 (age 33) Vilnius, Lithuania
- Height: 1.80 m (5 ft 11 in)
- Weight: 70 kg (154 lb)

Sport
- Country: Lithuania
- Sport: Badminton
- Handedness: Right
- Coached by: Genadijus Plavinas

Men's singles & doubles
- Highest ranking: 369 (MS) 24 Jul 2014; 131 (MD) 23 Apr 2015
- BWF profile

Alan Plavin (born 2 June 1993) is a Lithuanian male badminton player. He won the men's singles silver medal at the 2013 Maccabiah Games. In the final, he was defeated by Misha Zilberman of Israel. He won bronze in the men's singles and the men's doubles at the 2022 Maccabiah Games.

== Achievements ==
=== BWF International Challenge/Series ===
Men's Doubles

Year	Tournament	Partner	Opponent	Score	Result
2015	Lithuanian International	(Lithuania) Povilas Bartusis	(Poland) Milosz Bochat (Poland) Pawel Pietryja	17-21, 13–21	(silver) Runner-up

BWF International Challenge tournament
BWF International Series tournament
BWF Future Series tournament
