= Darca Schools =

Non-governmental organization operating a network of schools in Israel

- Formation: 2010
- Founder: Alliance Israélite Universelle and Rashi Foundation
- Headquarters: Israel
- CEO: Dr. Gil Pereg
- Key people: Jimmy Pinto
- Website: https://darca.org.il/en/homepage/

Darca Schools (Darca, "The Path" in Aramaic) is a non-profit organization operating a network of 47 schools and learning centers located in Israel's geographic and socio-economic periphery.

== History ==
The Darca Network was established in Israel by the Alliance Israélite Universelle and Rashi Foundation in 2010. In June 2014 Darca Schools Network formed an alliance with YRF Israel. YRF - Youth Renewal Fund is the philanthropic funding partner for the Darca Schools Network. Darca is sustained by donations from Israeli and international foundations, businesses, and individuals, in addition to the budget provided by the Israeli Ministry of Education. Darca's primary goal is to strengthen under-served communities in Israel's periphery by strengthening the local education system, specifically in high schools. There is an emphasis on funding these schools in "geo-social periphery" to make them competitive with schools in affluent communities.

The Darca Network serves all sectors of Israeli society. It operates and manages 53 schools and two "learning centers" nationwide, including five schools under its pedagogical auspices. A significant portion of the network's resources are invested in the development of programs to support school leadership teams, while simultaneously promoting academic achievement, social values and social responsibility. Darca offers its teachers continuous training programs so that they can effectively convey and teach humanitarian and democratic values to students, as well as to provide high level studies in STEM, English, Literature and all other academic subjects .

DARCA is a not-for-profit organization supported by donations from foundations, corporations and individuals in Israel and abroad, in addition to the budget provided by the Ministry of Education. Dr. Gil Pereg has been the CEO of the Darca Network since its inception. Darca's former chairmen were Avigdor Willenz and Eli Alaluf, and Darca's current chairman is Jimmy Pinto.

In April 2017, the Ministry of Education released their rankings of the education networks operating in Israel. According to the rating, the Darca Network was ranked first among the six networks in measures of eligibility for matriculation, excellence on Bagrut (matriculation) exams, and in the study of high level mathematics and English. In the years that followed, Darca continued to lead in many measures of excellence and quality in education and succeeded in maintaining consistency in its achievements. In August 2018 and August 2019, the Darca Network was ranked first in the network quality index for the second and third consecutive years. The network’s success is impressive in light of the fact that it began operating in 2011, mainly in disadvantaged communities and neighborhoods. Today, the average matriculation rate among Darca’s schools has reached 93.5%, significantly higher than the national average. Darca Schools is led by Dr. Gil Pereg, practicing CEO since its foundation, and Jimmy Pinto, Chairman.

== See also ==
- Bagrut
- Education in Israel
- Israel's National Student and Youth Council
- Ministry of Education (Israel)
- Knesset Committee on Education, Culture and Sports
- Other school networks recognized by the Ministry of Education:
  - AMIT
  - Bnei Akiva
  - ORT
  - Tzvia
