= Stagger breathing =

Breathing technique used by musicians

Stagger breathing (also staggered breathing) is a technique for choir singers and wind instrument players as part of an ensemble, by which no breath gaps can be heard in favour of a continuous sound effect. It is used mostly at particular points predestined to breathe rather than during a whole musical work.
