= Henry Leck =

- Born: Henry Leck; 1946 (age 79–80)
- Genres: Classical
- Occupation: Conductor
- Years active: 1986–Present
- Website: www.icchoir.org

Henry H. Leck (born c. 1946) is the founder and previous artistic director of the Indianapolis Children's Choir and the Indianapolis Youth Chorale. He is a choral clinician and a specialist on boys' changing voices.

In 1986, Leck formed the Indianapolis Children's Choir which has toured internationally with much acclaim.

Leck has conducted festival choirs in nearly every state in the U.S., and has led many international children's choir festivals, including the Musica Mundi Tuscany Children's Choir Festival in Italy, the Central European International Children's Choral Festival, the International Children's Choir Festival in Beijing, China, the Vienna Children's & Boys Choir Festival with the Vienna Sangerknaben, and the KI Concert Spain Festival. He recently conducted the Tokyo International HS Honor Choir in Japan. Leck founded the ARCI São Paulo Children's Honor Choir in Brazil, where he conducts bi-annually.

Until his retirement in 2016, Leck served as artistic director of the Indianapolis Children's Choir for 30 years, where he built the legacy of one of the most respected Children's Choirs in the United States. Leck also served on the Choral Faculty at Butler University for 27 years. He retired from his position as associate professor of music at Butler in 2015, and now serves as professor emeritus. He is also recognized as an Honorary Associate Professor at the Hong Kong Institute for Teacher Education.

== Works ==
Leck has published many choral arrangements with Hal Leonard Corporation and Colla Voce Music Publishing. He also authored the choral section of Silver Burdett music textbooks for grades 4, 5 and 6.

He has produced four teaching videos entitled The Boy’s Expanding Voice: Take the High Road, Vocal Techniques for the Young Singer, Creating Artistry Through Movement, Dalcroze Eurhythmics and Creating Artistry with the Male Maturing Voice.

Leck is also the editor of two nationally known choral series published by Hal Leonard and Colla Voce, from which many of his own compositions can be purchased.

In 2012, Leck's arrangement of "The National Anthem" was performed by Kelly Clarkson, and Indianapolis Children's Choir, at Super Bowl XLVI.

== Creating Artistry ==
Each year Leck teaches his conductor's workshop, Creating Artistry, at Butler University. In this progressive three level workshop, Leck mentors conductors and teachers of all ages, working towards building musicality through expressive conducting gesture. Leck recently released a textbook called Creating Artistry Through Choral Excellence.

== Education ==
Leck graduated from Merrill High School in 1964. He received his bachelor's degree in music from the University of Wisconsin–Stevens Point and a master of music in choral conducting at Indiana University. He did graduate work at the University of Colorado and worked on his doctorate in choral conducting at Indiana University School of Music.

== Awards ==
- Chorus America's Distinguished Service Award (2017)
- NUVO's Cultural Vision Award - Lifetime Achievement Award (2016)
- National Association for Music Education's Lowell Mason Fellows Award (2015)
- Indiana Governor's Art Award (2007)
- Indiana Music Education Association "Outstanding University Music Educator of the Year" (1992)
