= David Azrieli =

Israeli-Canadian entrepreneur (1922–2014)

David Joshua Azrieli
- דוד יהושע עזריאלי
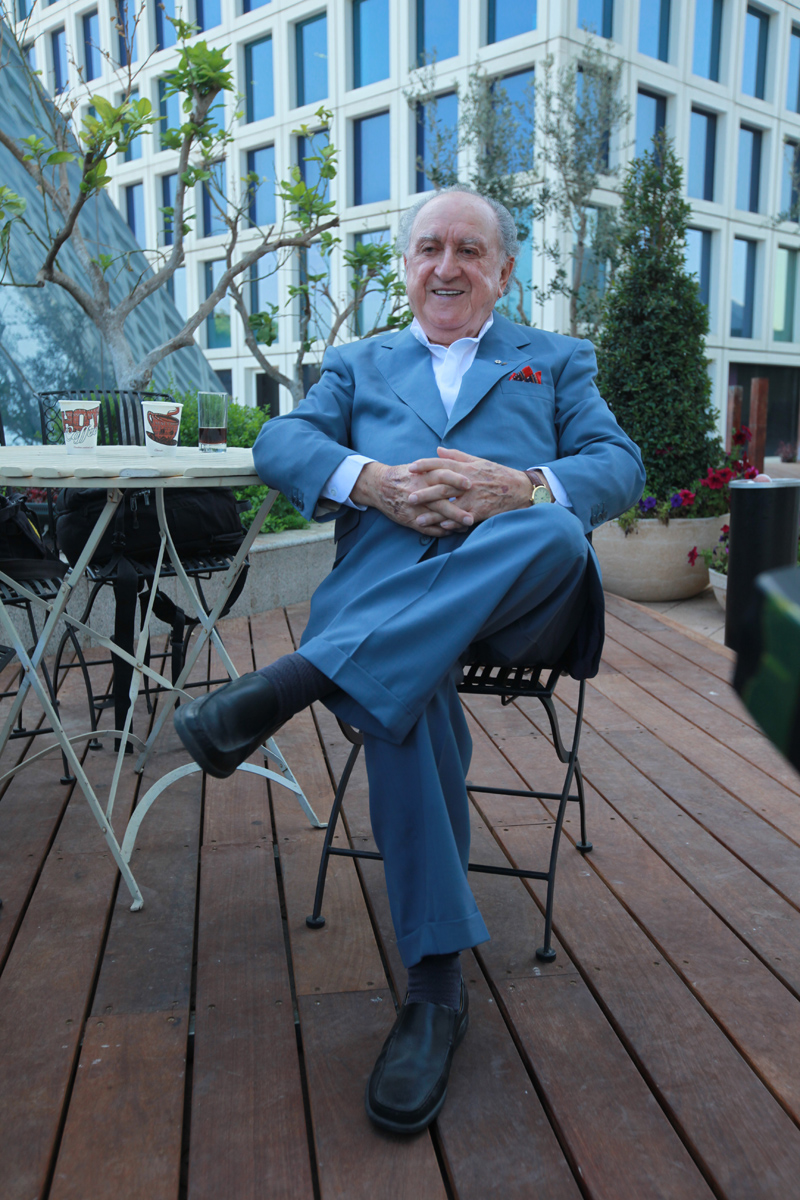
- Born: 10 May 1922; Maków Mazowiecki, Poland
- Died: 9 July 2014 (aged 92); Ivry-sur-le-Lac, Canada
- Citizenship: Israeli; Canadian
- Education: Thomas More Institute (BA); Carleton University (MArch)
- Occupations: Real estate developer; architect; philanthropist
- Organization: Azrieli Foundation
- Agent: Azrieli Group
- Spouse: Stephanie Lefcort (m. 1957)
- Children: 4, including Sharon and Danna
- Awards: Order of Canada (1984); Order of Quebec (1999)
- Military career
- Allegiance: State of Israel
- Branch: Haganah
- Service years: c. 1946–1949
- Unit: 7th Brigade
- Conflicts: Arab–Israeli conflict; 1948 Arab–Israeli War

David Joshua Azrieli (born David Azrylewicz in Maków Mazowiecki, Poland) CM CQ (Hebrew: דוד יהושע עזריאלי; 10 May 1922 – 9 July 2014) was an Israeli-Canadian tycoon, real estate developer, architect, and philanthropist. He was a “devoted zionist”, serving as the National President of the Canadian Zionist Federation in the 1980s. With an estimated net worth of US$3.1 billion in March 2013, he was ranked by Forbes as the ninth-wealthiest Canadian and the 401st wealthiest person overall.

In 1989, he founded the philanthropic Azrieli Foundation, to which he bequeathed the bulk of his estate upon his death in 2014.

== Biography ==
Azrieli was born into a family of Ashkenazi Jews in the town of Maków Mazowiecki, in what was then the Second Polish Republic. Following the outbreak of World War II, he fled from the German-led invasion of Poland and took refuge in the Soviet Union for a brief period. By late 1942, he had arrived in the British Mandate for Palestine, having been smuggled along with a weapons shipment concealed in coffins for the Yishuv. By 1945, except for one of his brothers, Azrieli's entire family had been murdered in the Holocaust throughout German-occupied Europe.

Between 1943 and 1946, Azrieli studied architecture at the Technion – Israel Institute of Technology in the city of Haifa, but did not complete his degree. He subsequently enlisted with the 7th Brigade of the Haganah and fought in the 1948 Arab–Israeli War. In 1954, he immigrated to Canada from Israel, settling down in the city of Montreal. In Canada, he reconnected with a few of his first cousins who had also survived the Holocaust and fled from Europe, including Henia Azrieli Rosenfeld. He routinely came for Shabbat dinner to Henia’s home while working and studying.

In Montreal, Azrieli enrolled at the Thomas More Institute (now part of Bishop's University), where he completed a Bachelor of Arts in 1956. At the age of 75, he earned a Masters of Architecture from Carleton University in the city of Ottawa.

In 1957, he married Stephanie Lefcort. They have four children: Rafael, Sharon, Naomi, and Danna. For the last ten years of his life, Azrieli and his wife resided in the Israeli city of Herzliya for five months per year and in the Canadian city of Westmount for the rest of the year. On July 9, 2014, he died at the age of 92 in his lakeside house at Ivry-sur-le-Lac.

== Career ==
=== Real estate and other businesses ===
In Montreal, he established his building business, beginning with the construction of small duplexes and working his way up to apartment buildings and, later on, shopping malls. Azrieli's building projects can be seen in the office buildings, high-rise residences, office towers, and shopping centres that he built in Canada, the United States, and Israel. His two companies are Montreal-based Canpro Investments Ltd. and Tel Aviv–based Azrieli Group Ltd.

In 2010, he took the Azrieli Group public in the largest ever IPO on the Tel Aviv Stock Exchange. It is now the largest real estate company in the country. Its projects include a number of Israeli commercial centres, including the first enclosed mall in Israel (the Canion Ayalon in Ramat Gan) as well as the Malha Mall in Jerusalem and the Beersheba Shopping Mall (Canion ha-Negev). He also built the eponymous Azrieli Centre in Tel Aviv, the largest real estate project in Israel, which includes three skyscrapers in the heart of Tel Aviv and has become an architectural landmark at the core of Israel's business industry.

=== Philanthropy ===
The Azrieli Foundation was established by David Azrieli in 1989 to support initiatives and develop and operate programs that promote access to education and the achievement of excellence in various fields of knowledge and activity.

Azrieli's early philanthropy established the Azrieli Graduate School of Jewish Education and Administration at Yeshiva University in New York City and supported schools and educational institutions in Canada and Israel. His aim to support education in multiple and diverse ways guides the Azrieli Foundation to this day. The Foundation has disbursed over CA$450 million since 1989. Notable donations in that time include: the Azrieli Schools of Architecture at Tel Aviv University and Carleton University; the Azrieli Faculty of Medicine at Bar-Ilan University, the creation of the Azrieli Institute for Educational Empowerment, Azrieli Institute for Systems Biology at Weizmann Institute of Science, Azrieli Institute of Israel Studies at Concordia University, and the School of Continuing Studies at Technion – Israel Institute of Technology.

The Israeli newspaper Haaretz reported that "What you won’t find on either the [Azrieli] foundation’s or company’s websites is that in 2010 the Azrieli Group apparently donated NIS 30,000 (CAD $10,000) to Im Tirtzu", even though the Azrieli group "claims it has no political agenda." The donation was made specifically "to a project to stop the academic boycott of Israel" by Palestinian-led initiatives.

In 2020, the Azrieli Foundation created an emergency fund to be allocated to meet urgent needs caused by the COVID-19 pandemic. As of 1 October 2020, the Foundation pledged CA$8.6 million for pandemic-related initiatives, including food relief, hospitals and long-term care institutions, and support for the vulnerable, including Holocaust survivors, people with disabilities, people experiencing homelessness, and students.

== Awards and recognition ==
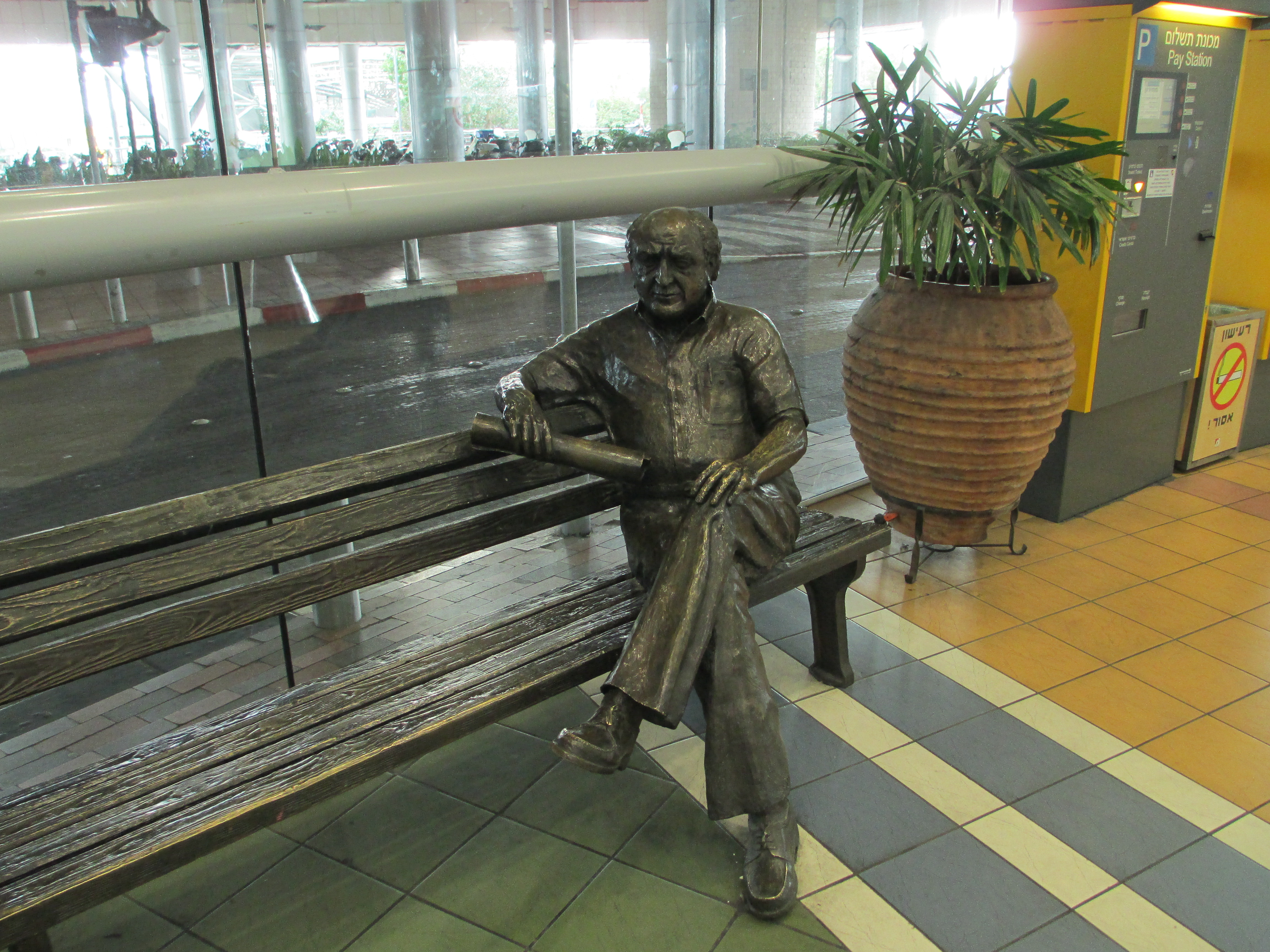
Sculpture of Azrieli in Tel Aviv, by Asaf Lifshitz

- Member of the Order of Canada (1984)
- Chevalier to the Ordre national du Quebec (1999)
- Honorary doctorates from Concordia University (1975), Yeshiva University (1983), Technion – Israel Institute of Technology (1985), Tel Aviv University (1996), Carleton University (2003), and Weizmann Institute of Science (2012)
- Jubilee Award of the Prime Minister of Israel (1998)
- Honorary Fellow of the City of Jerusalem (2001)
- Queen Elizabeth II Golden Jubilee Medal (2002)
- Queen Elizabeth II Diamond Jubilee Medal (2012)

== Published works ==
- Azrieli, Danna (2001). One Step Ahead: David J. Azrieli (Azrylewicz) : Memoirs 1939–1950. Jerusalem: Yad Vashem.
- Azrieli, David J. (2008). Rekindling the Torch: Story of Canadian Zionism. Toronto: Key Porter Books Ltd. ISBN 978-1-55263-977-1.

== See also ==
- Jewish Canadians
  - Israeli Canadians
- Economy of Canada
- Economy of Israel
