= ORT Israel =

Israeli educational organization

- ORT Israel logo
- Formation: 1949 (by World ORT)
- Type: Organizations based in Israel
- Legal status: active
- Purpose: education
- Region served: Israel
- Website: ort.org.il

Pictures of ORT schools

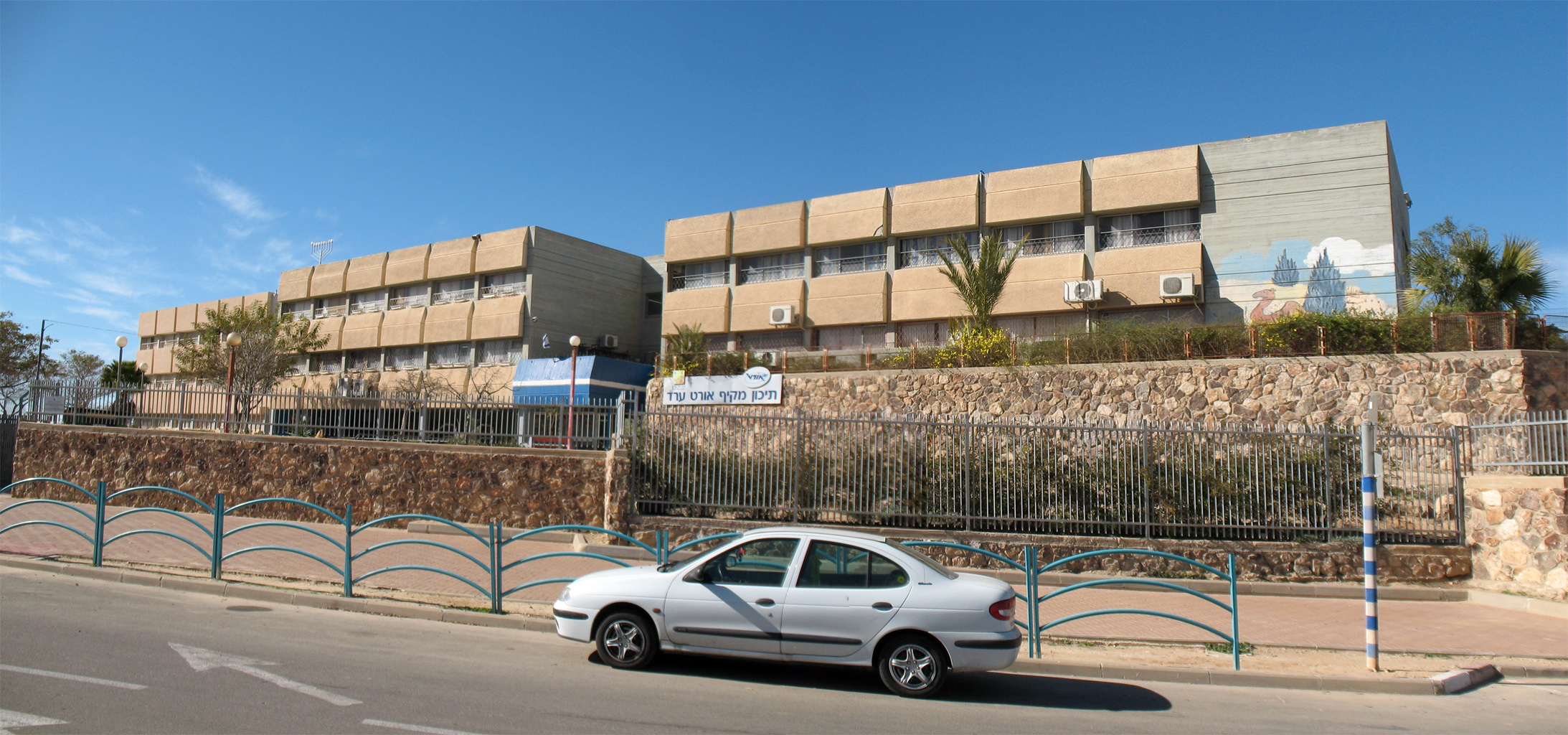
ORT Arad

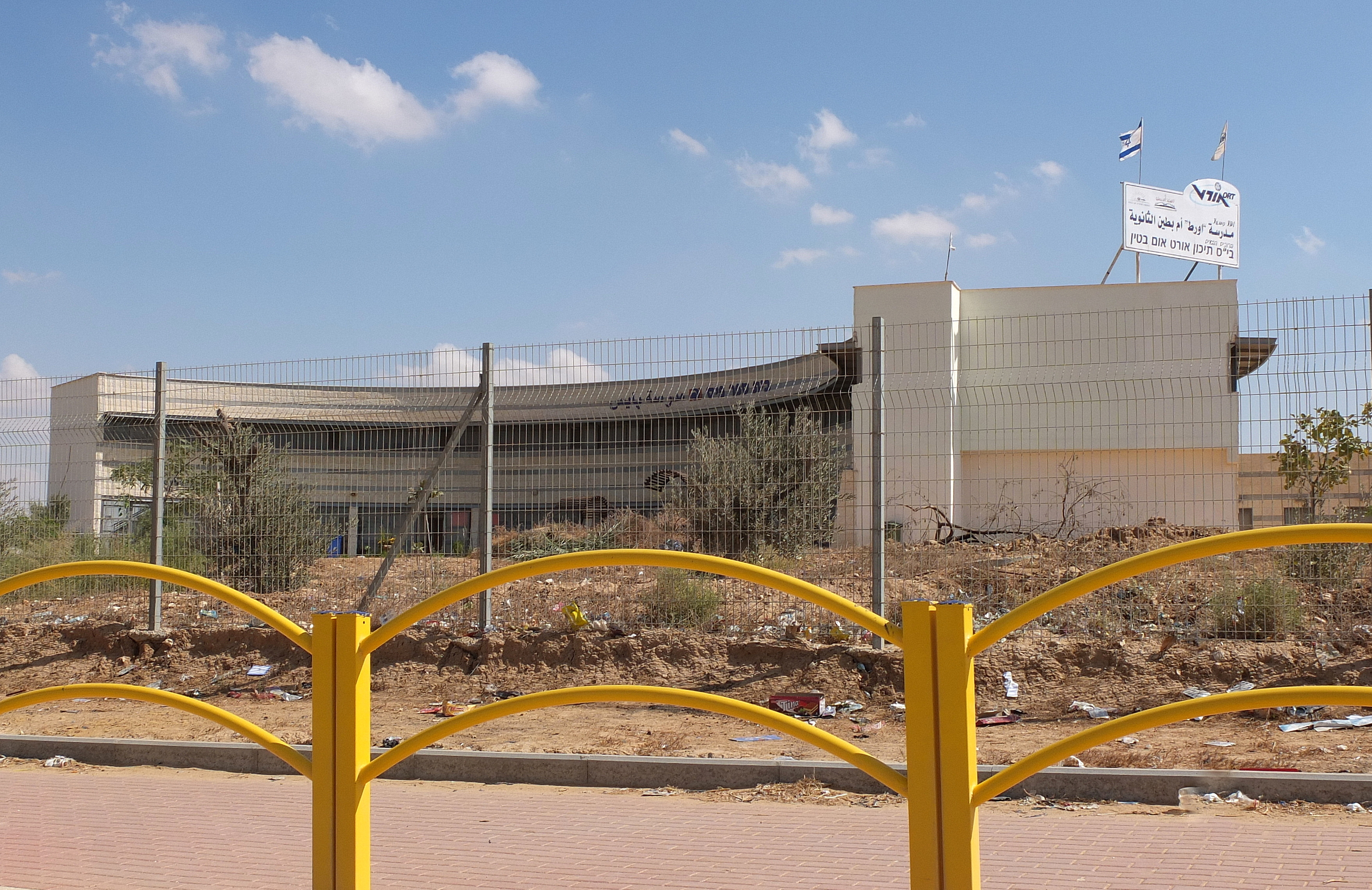
ORT high school in Umm Batin, a Bedouin town in the Negev

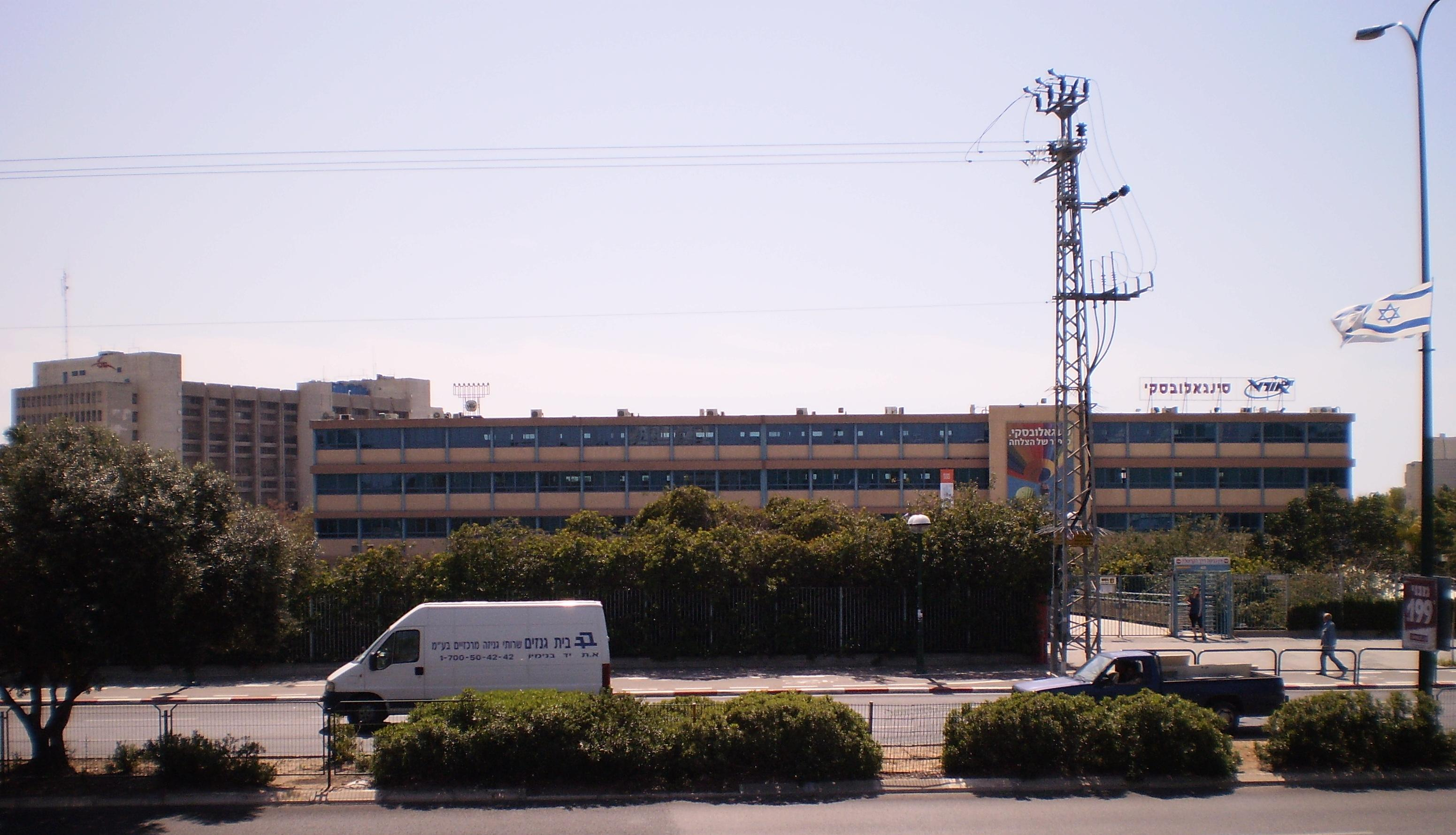
ORT Singalovski, Tel Aviv

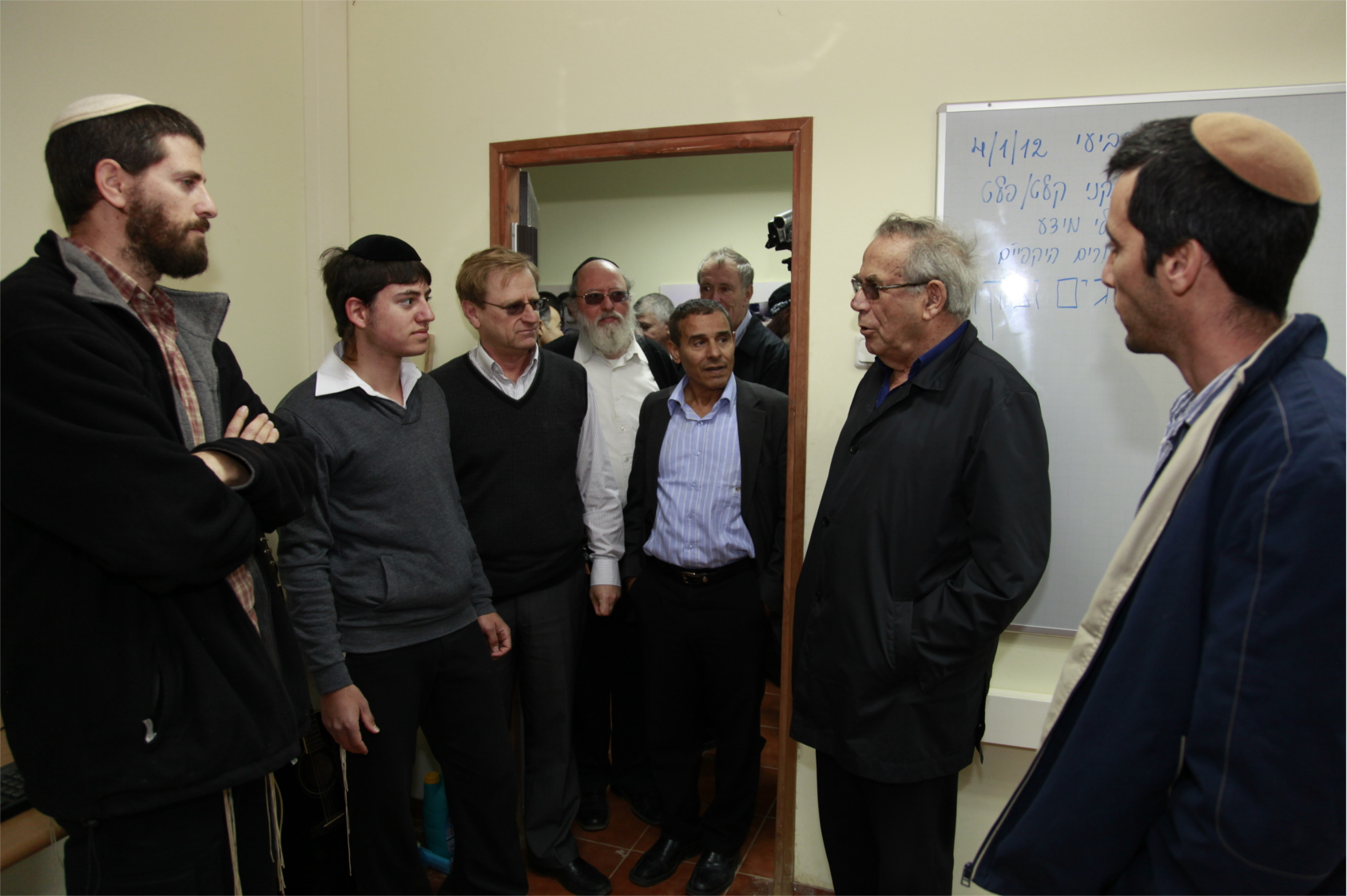
ORT Kfar Zeitim Yeshiva

ORT Israel (Hebrew: אורט ישראל) is a non-government organization devoted to education in Israel.

"ORT Israel" (ORT is an acronym of the Russian: Общество Ремесленного Труда, romanized: Óbchestvo Reméslenava Trudá – "Association for Vocational Crafts") is the largest educational network in Israel for science and technology education and has been operating in Israel since 1949 as a public benefit company. The network operates some 210 educational institutions including engineering colleges, middle and high schools, and one elementary school, in over 55 local authorities. Some 100,000 students attend ORT Israel schools and colleges and, to date, the network has trained some 600,000 graduates. Its students come from all sectors and populations in Israeli society.

== History ==
Ort Israel began functioning in 1948, when Aharon Singalovski, Chairperson of World ORT, came to Israel. With the dramatic increase in Jewish immigration from North Africa, Europe and the Middle East, new challenges in absorption and rehabilitation emerged. Thousands of new immigrants needed to be integrated into the new society, and to this end, jobs and vocational training were needed. Many senior figures in the country supported this idea, such as Zalman Shazar, then the Minister of Education, and later to become president, Zalman Aran, later to become Minister of Education, and Mordechai Bentov, the Minister of Housing. The management of ORT rented an abandoned building in Jaffa and another one on the Street of the Prophets in Jerusalem.

The first ORT school in Israel opened in Jaffa in 1949. Its beginnings were modest, with only short courses for discharged soldiers, in order to make it easier for them to integrate into the country's economy. The school was headed by engineer Zvi Rivlin. Thus ORT Israel was founded, and this was also the beginning of technology education in the State of Israel. The school operated for seven years in extremely crowded conditions. The first courses were in welding, carpentry, sewing, weaving, radio, electricity, and typewriter repair. Hundreds of discharged soldiers and new immigrants passed through the school, studying mainly in evening classes. A new school building was opened in the 1950s in Yad Eliyahu which was named for Aharon Singalovski.

During the 1960s, the number of students doubled. This was also the case in the 1970s. The education authorities in Israel declared technological and vocational education a priority and called for more schools to be built. Between 1960 and 1975, 60 additional schools were added to the network to make a total of 80 schools. Thus, a decade later, the number of ORT students exceeded 70,000. The new schools were opened not just in the big cities, but also on kibbutzim, in development towns and yeshivas. Some were also built in Arab towns.

In 2003, Israel was World ORT's largest sphere of operation, with 90,000 students enrolled in 159 schools, colleges and institutions. In 2006, ORT Israel broke away from World ORT, which continues to work in Israel as Kadima Mada-Educating for Life. ORT Israel now raises funds in the United States through Friends of Israel Sci-Tech Schools. Kadima Mada is investing NIS16 million to upgrade technology studies in 72 Jewish and non-Jewish schools in Israel.

Since the turn of the century, the network has expanded considerably, making its main goal the cultivation of schools that define themselves as providing high-level science and technology education. ORT institutions are spread around the entire country. One in ten post-elementary students attends an ORT Israel school. Every year, some 100,000 students, youth and adults study in its institutions. The network serves the entire population of the country, both geographically and demographically, working in all the various communities: state schools (Jewish and Arab: Muslim, Christian and Druze), state-religious schools (yeshivot and ulpanot). The ORT Israel network has over 600,000 graduates, and employs 8,500 teaching and administrative staff.

Today ORT is the largest non-state network of schools in Israel. Until a few years ago ORT primarily operated trade and vocational schools. Now the focus is on the advancement of science and technology education.

== Institutions and administration ==
The network runs over 200 institutions, including 6-year comprehensive (middle and high) schools, industrial schools, and colleges for technicians and practical engineers, which train some 30% of the technology HR for Israel's economy. The Ort Israel Research and Development Center was established by Manya and Israel Moshinsky of Mexico [3] in 1972.

The Center was designed to train ORT teachers the work methods and applications of the new technologies used in ORT's more advanced study tracks. The Pedagogical Center became a model for other information centers worldwide. The Center was built on the campus of the ORT Singalovski High School. The R&D Center supervised the writing of technology textbooks for students and teachers which have been translated into several languages. Over the years, there has been a shift from textbooks to the development of online tools and information systems for teaching and learning.

The R&D Center currently has some 100 employees and is responsible for innovative pedagogical development for the entire network. The Center also exports curricula abroad to both Jewish and non-Jewish communities. Every year the ORT R&D Center takes part in international science and technology projects and has a reputation for quality and innovation.

ORT Israel Presidents		Board of Directors Chairs		ORT Israel Director Generals
Name	Term	Name	Term	Name	Term
Dr. Yehuda Biehm	1949-1954	Yosef S. Shapira	1960-1964	Dr. Yosef Amitai	1949-1950
Yosef S. Shapira	1954-1964	Elazar L. Epstein	1964-1967	Yaakov Oleisky	1950-1966
Elazar L. Epstein	1964-1968	Chaim Herzog	1968-1974	Yosef Harmatz	1967-1979
Chaim Herzog	1968-1984	Uziel Steinberg	1975-1992	Michael Avitzur	1979-1983
Uziel Steinberg	1984-2007	Zalman Shalev	1993-2000	Israel Goralnik	1983-1996
Prof. Bracha Reger	2007–present	Dr. Uzi Tsuk	2001–present	Adv. Haim Ben Ami	1996-2002
				Zvi Peleg	2002–present

== Study tracks and programs ==
ORT Israel offers 40 different study tracks in science and technology, social sciences and humanities. About 60% of ORT Israel students study in science and technology tracks.

ORT has been the first to launch study tracks in Israel in: biomedical engineering, mechatronics, biotechnology, nanotechnology, environmental studies and electro-optics. Parallel to their high school studies, some 1,200 outstanding ORT students also study n the ORT Academy program for a bachelor's degree at the Technion and Israel's other research universities.

Teaching methods at ORT include a combination of online learning systems that use the internet and social media platforms. Among these, ORT Israel has developed a Learning Management System based on an open source platform, launched a virtual school and supports over 100 websites specially developed and run by the network's teachers and students.

In 1996, World ORT launched the "Science through Technology" in Israeli junior high schools (grade 7–9). In the "Young Investigators" program for seventh graders, the students build LEGO models to explore scientific phenomenon. In "Galileo, Newton and Me" for eighth graders, LEGO is used to study systems. In the "Design your own world" program, ninth graders attempt to solve real-life problems using LEGO bricks and programming.

In 2008, Kadima Mada embarked on a project to build high-tech classrooms, equipping 60 rooms on six campuses with Interactive Whiteboards, wireless Internet and other technological aids.

== Educational sectors ==
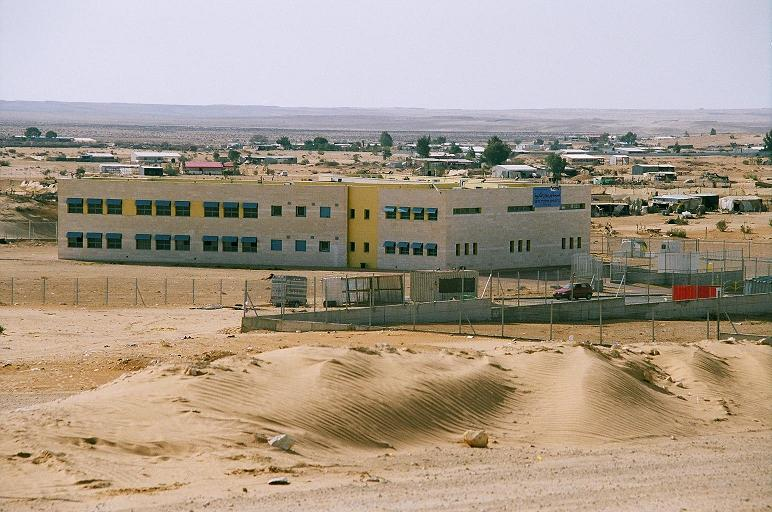
ORT Bir Hadaj (بئر هداج) High School in the Bedouin dispersion

- Religious sector – 8 institutions in 2015, such as the ORT Tiberias Ulpanit for girls, the ORT Orot Neria Yeshiva in Tiberias for boys.
- Ultra-orthodox sector – 7 institutions in 2015, such as the Kfar Zeitim Youth Village, ORT Zoharim and ORT Derech Hayashar in Afula, which are run in conjunction with the institutions of Rabbi Itzhak David Grossman. These institutions are for boys only.
- Muslim sector – 7 institutions in 2015, such as ORT Hilmi Shafi in Acco, and ORT Sciences & Engineering in Lod.
- Druze sector – 3 institutions in 2015, such as ORT Sajur and ORT Gilboa
- Bedouin sector – 8 institutions in the south in 2016 for the clans of the Abu Basma (أبو بسمة) local council region and one in the north in Wadi Salame (سلامة).
- Christian sector– 2 schools, in Nazareth and Maalot-Tarshiha.

Each year the network continues to expand and take on more schools from these sectors.

== Collaborations ==
=== IDF ===
Various ORT institutions maintain close ties with the Israel Defense Forces (IDF). The two main ones are ORT Israel Aerospace Industries, which offers an UAV study track and ORT Air Force at Tel Nof, which trains students for technical support roles in the Air Force. Additional schools incorporate a cadet program.

This collaboration with the IDF has led thousands of ORT graduates to serve in engineering, technology and ICT positions in the IDF. Among other things, ORT graduates work on developing sophisticated combat systems for aircraft and helicopters and on programming information systems for the Air Force, the Navy and the Intelligence Corps. After their military service, many ORT Israel graduates take jobs in Israel's defense industries, including Elbit Systems, Rafael, and the IAI.

=== Industry and the Corporate Sector ===
Together with representatives from the Manufacturer's Association, ORT Israel heads a project of having schools adopted by industrial concerns to allow students to get to know them and gain hands-on experience while still studying. In addition, ORT Israel operates a track in conjunction with the Ministry of Economics and Industry to place practical engineers in the country's key corporations.

=== International projects ===
ORT represents Israel in collaborations with bodies and educational institutions around the world. For example, ORT Israel led the Consortium on nanotechnology as part of the FP-7 programs of the European Union. It is part of the e-learning initiative in which 10 Mediterranean Basin countries are participating, and has been involved in a project of the British Council to make connections between academia and industry.

ORT Israel exports science and technology curricula to high schools and middle schools in Europe and the US. In the US, ORT Israel functions under the name of the Israel Sci-Tech Schools Network.

== See also ==
- Education in Israel
- Science and technology in Israel
