= List of tallest buildings in Israel =

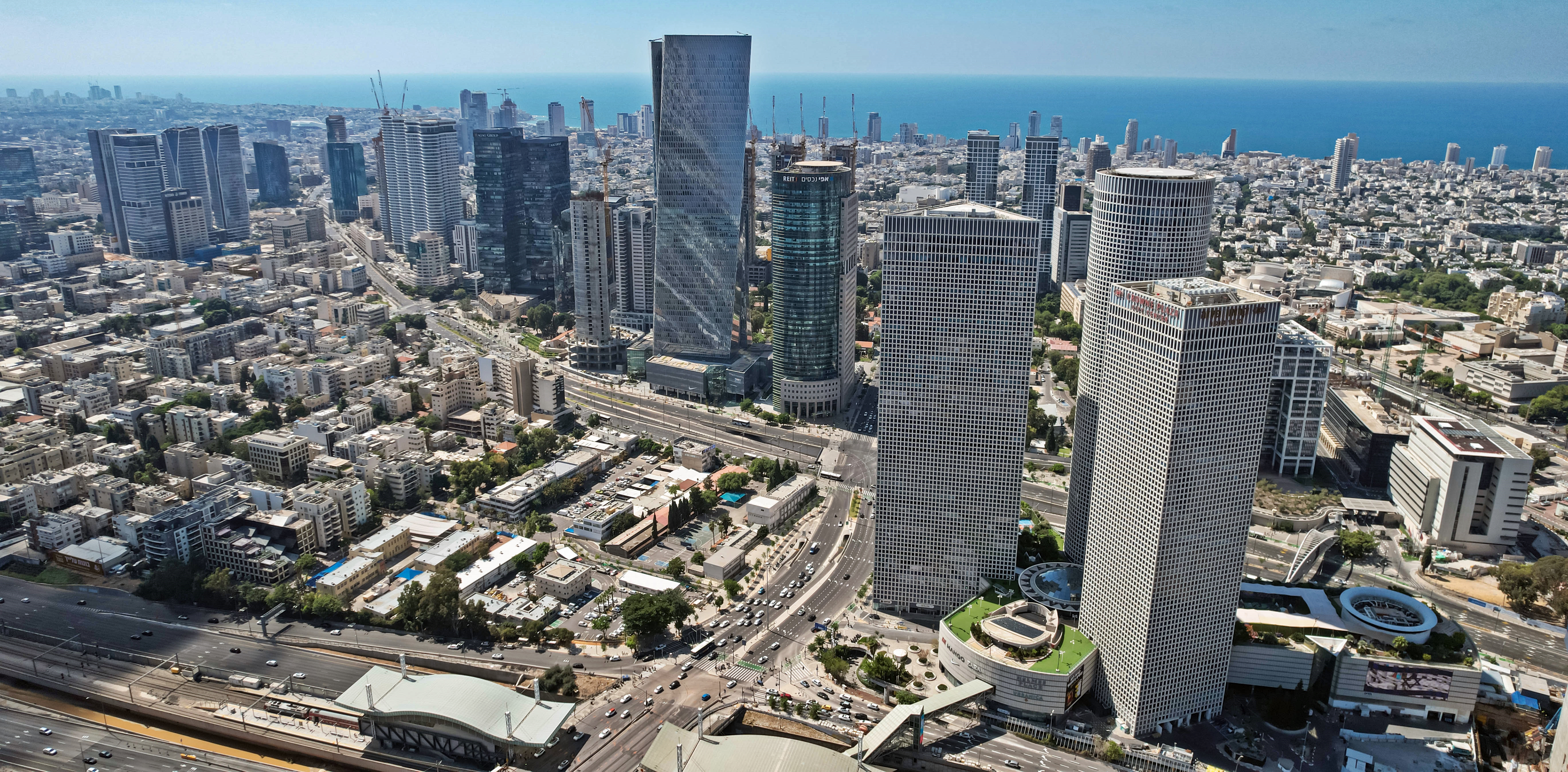
Tel Aviv skyline

This list ranks skyscrapers in Israel by height. It includes completed and under-construction skyscrapers in Israel that exceed 120 m (390 ft) in height. The list is sorted by official height. When two or more buildings share the same height, they are given equal ranking and then ordered by number of floors. If both the height and floor count are the same, the buildings are listed alphabetically. As of 2025, Israel has three skyscrapers under construction that will exceed 300 meters in height. The Beyond Office Tower became the tallest skyscraper in the country when it topped out in July 2025.

Four towers have held the title of the tallest building in Israel. The Shalom Tower, inaugurated in 1965 on the ruins of the Herzliya Hebrew Gymnasium on Herzl Street in Tel Aviv, was the first of these. The building rises to a height of 129 meters and stands at 36 floors. The Shalom Tower also held the title of "tallest skyscraper in the Middle East" for 14 years. The tower held the corresponding title in Israel for 34 years, until the topping out of the Azrieli Tower from 1999 which rose to a height of 186 m (610 ft) with 49 floors, 57 meters higher than the Shalom Tower. The Azrieli Tower held the title for only two years, until 2001 when the 235 m (771 ft) Moshe Aviv Tower in Ramat Gan was finished. The latter held the title for 15 years until, in 2016, the Azrieli Sarona Tower took over with a height of 238.5 m (782 ft).

== Tallest buildings ==
Was the tallest building in Israel upon completion
Architecturally topped out but not yet completed

=== > 150 meters ===
Rank	Name	Image	City	Location	Year	Use	Height m (ft)	Floors	Notes	Reference
1	Beyond Office Tower		Givatayim	Givatayim City	2026	Office	308.3 m (1,011 ft)	72	Topped out in 2024. Tallest building in Tel Aviv's metropolitan area and Israel.	
2	ToHa Tower 2		Tel Aviv	Nahalat Yitzhak	2026	Office	301.6 m (990 ft)	76		
3	Azrieli Sarona Tower		Tel Aviv	Southern Kirya	2017	Office	238.4 m (782 ft)	61	Tallest building in Israel between 2017 and 2024.	
4	Moshe Aviv Tower		Ramat Gan	Diamond Exchange District	2001	Office, residential	235 m (771 ft)	68	Tallest building in Israel between 2001 and 2017.	
5	Hi Tower		Givatayim	Givatayim City	2024	Residential	226.7 m (744 ft)	58		
6	Nimrodi Tower		Bnei Brak	Bnei Brak Business Center	2023	Office	211.3 m (693 ft)	52		
7	EXchange Residences		Ramat Gan	Diamond Exchange District	2025	Residential	206.5 m (677 ft)	59		
8	HaShahar Tower		Givatayim	Givatayim City	2016	Mixed-use	201 m (659 ft)	54		
9	EXchange Offices		Ramat Gan	Diamond Exchange District	2025	Office	197 m (646 ft)	59		
10	Midtown Office		Tel Aviv	Ayalon Highway	2017	Office	196 m (643 ft)	50		
11	Big Fashion Glilot 1		Ramat HaSharon	Glilot	2024	Office	190 m (623 ft)	45		
12=	Azrieli Center Circular Tower		Tel Aviv	Ayalon Highway	1999	Office	187 m (614 ft)	49	Tallest building in Israel between 1999 and 2001.	
12=	Dan Center Tower		Bnei Brak	Bnei Brak Business Center	2023	Office	187 m (614 ft)	44		
14	The Park Tower		Bnei Brak	Bnei Brak Industrial Zone	2025	Office	186.7 m (613 ft)	47		
15	Midtown Residences		Tel Aviv	Ayalon Highway	2018	Residential	183 m (600 ft)	50		
16	Hachsharat HaYishuv Tower		Bnei Brak	Bnei Brak Business Center	2019	Office	180 m (590 ft)	45		
17	Lyfe Tower B		Bnei Brak	Bnei Brak Business Center	2022	Office	175 m (574 ft)	42		
18	Rom Tel Aviv		Tel Aviv	Park Tzameret	2021	Residential	173.1 m (568 ft)	50		
19=	Arlozorov Young Towers 1		Tel Aviv	Ayalon Highway	2020	Residential	170 m (560 ft)	53		
19=	Azrieli Town Residences		Tel Aviv	Ayalon Highway	2022	Residential	170 m (560 ft)	50		
21=	Azrieli Center Triangular Tower		Tel Aviv	Ayalon Highway	1999	Office	169 m (554 ft)	46		
21=	Electra Tower		Tel Aviv	Ayalon Highway	2011	Office	169 m (554 ft)	45		
23	Eden Tower		Bat Yam	Park HaYam	2022	Residential	168.5 m (553 ft)	47		
24=	Alon Towers 1		Tel Aviv	Ayalon Highway	2017	Office	165 m (541 ft)	42		
24=	Alon Towers 2		Tel Aviv	Ayalon Highway	2017	Office	165 m (541 ft)	42		
24=	Landmark Tower 1		Tel Aviv	Southern Kirya	2024	Office	165 m (541 ft)	45		
27	Lighthouse Tower		Bat Yam	Park HaYam	2021	Residential	163.7 m (537 ft)	49		
28	Sapir Tower		Ramat Gan	Diamond Exchange District	2019	Office	163.6 m (537 ft)	42		
29	Uptown Tower		Bat Yam	Ramat Hanasi	2017	Residential	162 m (531 ft)	48		
30=	HaArba'a Tower 1		Tel Aviv	Southern Kirya	2017	Office	160 m (520 ft)	38		
30=	Champion Motors Tower		Bnei Brak	Bnei Brak Business Center	2013	Office	160 m (520 ft)	40		
30=	Wholesale Market Tower 1		Tel Aviv		2020	Residential	160 m (520 ft)	48		
30=	Wholesale Market Tower 2		Tel Aviv		2020	Residential	160 m (520 ft)	48		
30=	Wholesale Market Tower 3		Tel Aviv		2023	Residential	160 m (520 ft)	48		
30=	Lyfe Tower A		Bnei Brak	Bnei Brak Business Center	2022	Office	160 m (520 ft)	37		
36	Neve Nof Tower		Bat Yam	South Bat Yam	2013	Residential	158.5 m (520 ft)	42		
37=	Kirya Tower		Tel Aviv	Southern Kirya	2005	Office	158 m (518 ft)	42		
37=	Amot Atrium Tower		Ramat Gan	Diamond Exchange District	2015	Office	158 m (518 ft)	40		
37=	Meier on Rothschild		Tel Aviv	Rothschild Boulevard	2014	Residential	158 m (518 ft)	38		
37=	One Tower		Ramat Gan	Diamond Exchange District	2022	Office	158 m (518 ft)	38		
41	Leonardo City Tower		Ramat Gan	Diamond Exchange District	2000	Hotel, residential	157 m (515 ft)	37		
42	W-Tower		Tel Aviv	Park Tzameret	2010	Residential	156 m (512 ft)	46		
43=	Da Vinci North Tower		Tel Aviv	HaKirya	2022	Residential/Office	155.2 m (509 ft)	42		
43=	Da Vinci South Tower		Tel Aviv	HaKirya	2022	Residential/Office	155.2 m (509 ft)	42		
45	Azrieli Town 1		Tel Aviv	Ayalon Highway	2021	Office	155 m (509 ft)	40		
46=	Azrieli Center Square Tower		Tel Aviv	Ayalon Highway	2007	Office	154 m (505 ft)	42		
46=	Dimri Tower		Ashdod		2020	Residential	154 m (505 ft)	44		
48	H Recital Tower		Tel Aviv	Ayalon Highway	2019	Office	153 m (502 ft)	34		
49=	Gibor Sport House		Ramat Gan	Diamond Exchange District	2000	Office	152.5 m (500 ft)	37		
49=	East End Tower 2		Tel Aviv	East Side	2025	Mixed-use	152.5 m (500 ft)	36		
51	Global Towers 1		Petah Tikva	Ramat Siv	2020	Office	152 m (499 ft)	36		
52	Arlozorov Young Towers 2		Tel Aviv	Ayalon Highway	2020	Residential	151.7 m (498 ft)	47		
53=	Park Bavli 1		Tel Aviv	Bavli	2018	Residential	150 m (490 ft)	44		
53=	Park Bavli 2		Tel Aviv	Bavli	2023	Residential	150 m (490 ft)	44		
53=	Vision Tower		Tel Aviv	Kiryat Atidim	2011	Office	150 m (490 ft)	42		
53=	W-Prime Tower		Tel Aviv	Park Tzameret	2016	Residential	150 m (490 ft)	44		
57	HaArba'a Tower 2		Tel Aviv	Southern Kirya	2017	Office	146 m (479 ft)	34		

=== 120–150 meters ===
Name	City	Location	Year	Use	Height (tip)	Floors (above ground)	Source / Notes
Edgar 360 Tower	Tel Aviv	Yad Eliyahu	2001, 2015	Office	147 m (482 ft)	35	
Neve Tzedek Tower	Tel Aviv	Neve Tzedek	2008	Residential	147 m (482 ft)	44	
Delek Motors Tower	Tel Aviv	Nave Sha'anan	2020	Office	146 m (479 ft)	36	
Menora Mivtahim Tower	Ramat Gan	Diamond Exchange District	2017	Office	146 m (479 ft)	35	
BSR Tower 4	Bnei Brak	Bnei Brak Business Center	2013	Office	144 m (472 ft)	38	
K Tower 1	Ashdod		2014	Mixed-use	142 m (466 ft)	40	
Yoo Tel Aviv 2	Tel Aviv	Park Tzameret	2009	Residential	142 m (466 ft)	41	
Pisgat Dan	Ramat Gan		2020	Residential	140 m (460 ft)	42	
Manhattan Tower	Tel Aviv	Park Tzameret	2009	Residential	140 m (460 ft)	40	
TOU Tower 1	Tel Aviv	Hassan Arafe Compound	2021	Mixed-use	140 m (460 ft)	36	
TOU Tower 2	Tel Aviv	Hassan Arafe Compound	2021	Mixed-use	140 m (460 ft)	36	
Tel Aviv Tower 1	Tel Aviv	Nahalat Yitzhak	2000	Residential	140 m (460 ft)	34	
Tel Aviv Tower 2	Tel Aviv	Nahalat Yitzhak	2000	Residential	140 m (460 ft)	34	
Tel Aviv Tower 3	Tel Aviv	Nahalat Yitzhak	2013	Residential	140 m (460 ft)	34	
Lagoon Towers 2	Netanya	Nof HaTayelet	2016	Residential	140 m (460 ft)	40	
White City Residence	Tel Aviv		2015	Residential	139 m (456 ft)	33	
Azorim Hof Bat Yam	Bat Yam		2016	Residential	138 m (453 ft)	38	
K Tower 2	Ashdod		2014	Mixed-use	138 m (453 ft)	40	
Marganit Tower	Tel Aviv	The Kirya	1987	Office	138 m (453 ft)	17	
Vision Tower	Bat Yam		2016	Residential	138 m (453 ft)	41	
Infinity Campus Tower	Ra'anana		2024	Office	137 m (449 ft)	33	Tallest building in Ra'anana
Sail Tower	Haifa	Downtown	2002	Office	137 m (449 ft)	26	
Time Tower	Ramat Gan		2017	Office, residential	135 m (443 ft)	38	
BSR Tower 3	Bnei Brak	Bnei Brak Business Center	2013	Office	133.9 m (439 ft)	35	
First International Bank Tower	Tel Aviv	Rothschild Boulevard	2009	Office	132 m (433 ft)	35	
Uptown Tower 2	Bat Yam		2020	Office	131 m (430 ft)	34	
Ashdar Bat Yam	Bat Yam		2017	Residential	130 m (430 ft)	36	
Ayalon Tower	Ramat Gan	Diamond Exchange District	2008	Office	130 m (430 ft)	35	
IEC Tower	Haifa	Hof HaCarmel	2003	Office	130 m (430 ft)	37	
Lagoon Towers 1	Netanya	Nof HaTayelet	2014	Residential	130 m (430 ft)	37	
M Tower	Beersheba		2020	Office	130 m (430 ft)	32	
Shalom Meir Tower	Tel Aviv		1965	Office	129 m (423 ft)	34	
Yoo Tel Aviv 1	Tel Aviv	Park Tzameret	2007	Residential	128 m (420 ft)	40	
1 Rothschild Boulevard	Tel Aviv	Rothschild Boulevard	2010	Residential	125 m (410 ft)	34	
Aviv Rothschild Tower	Tel Aviv	Rothschild Boulevard	2013	Office	125 m (410 ft)	30	
BSR City 1	Petah Tikva		2022	Office	125 m (410 ft)	32	
BSR City 2	Petah Tikva		2022	Office	125 m (410 ft)	32	
BSR City 3	Petah Tikva		2022	Office	125 m (410 ft)	32	
BSR City 4	Petah Tikva		2022	Office	125 m (410 ft)	32	
Levinstein Tower	Tel Aviv	Begin Road	2000	Office	125 m (410 ft)	35	
Totzeret HaAretz 1	Tel Aviv		2019	Office	125 m (410 ft)	30	
Tzameret Tower 1	Tel Aviv		2002	Residential	123 m (404 ft)	34	
Tzameret Tower 2	Tel Aviv		2002	Residential	123 m (404 ft)	34	
Briga Towers 1	Netanya	Ir Yamim	2019	Residential	125 m (410 ft)	36	
Briga Towers 2	Netanya	Ir Yamim	2019	Residential	125 m (410 ft)	36	
Tzameret Tower 3	Tel Aviv		2005	Residential	123 m (404 ft)	34	
BSR Tower 2	Bnei Brak	Bnei Brak Business Center	2004	Office	121 m (397 ft)	30	
Holyland Tower 1	Jerusalem		2011	Residential	121 m (397 ft)	32	
Maslawi Elite Tower	Ramat Gan		2017	Residential	120 m (390 ft)	32	
Om Tower	Beersheba	Ne'ot Ilan	2018	Residential	120 m (390 ft)	33	

== Under construction ==
This list ranks buildings currently under preparation or construction in Israel that are planned to stand at least 150 metres (490 ft) tall.

Indicates buildings that have been topped out

Name	City	Location	Use	Height	Floors	Estimated completion
Azrieli Spiral Tower	Tel Aviv	Ayalon Highway	Office	350 m (1,150 ft)	91	2028
Totzeret HaAretz 2	Tel Aviv	Hashalom Road	Office	303.6 m (996 ft)	77	2026
Beyond 2	Givatayim	Givatayim City	Office	248.9 m (817 ft)	70	
EXchange Residences	Ramat Gan		Residential	206.5 m (677 ft)	59	2026
Duo Tel Aviv Tower 1	Tel Aviv	The Old North	Residential	200 m (656 ft)	54	2026
Duo Tel Aviv Tower 2	Tel Aviv	The Old North	Residential	200 m (656 ft)	54	2026
EXchange Offices	Ramat Gan		Office	197 m (646 ft)	49	2026
H Infinity Tower 1	Tel Aviv		Residential	197 m (646 ft)	51	
Semel North	Tel Aviv	The Old North	Residential	186 m (610 ft)	50	
Ma'ariv Tower	Tel Aviv		Office	180 m (591 ft)	45	
Masterpiece Bavli Tower 1	Tel Aviv	Bavli	Residential	174.8 m (573 ft)	48	
Masterpiece Bavli Tower 2	Tel Aviv	Bavli	Residential	174.8 m (573 ft)	48	
K Tower	Jerusalem	City Entrance CBD	Office	172.15 m (564.8 ft)	40	2029
Global Towers 2	Petah Tikva	Ramat Siv	Office	171 m (561 ft)	41	
Lexus Tower	Tel Aviv	Solelim	Office	170 m (558 ft)	48	
Landmark Tower 2	Tel Aviv	Southern Kirya	Office	165 m (541 ft)		2026
She	Tel Aviv	Rothschild		164 m (538 ft)	40	
Solelim Tower 1	Tel Aviv	Hashalom Road	Office	164 m (538 ft)	40	2025
Sarona Hotel	Tel Aviv	Sarona Compound		163 m (535 ft)	46	
Rothschild 10	Tel Aviv	Rothschild		161.4 m (530 ft)	42	2026
Avraham Tower	Bat Yam		Residential	161 m (528 ft)	45	
Wholesale Market Tower 4	Tel Aviv		Residential	160 m (525 ft)	48	2025
G City Tower	Rishon LeZion		Office, hotel	160 m (525 ft)	40	
Ahuzat Givatayim	Givatayim		Mixed-use	159 m (522 ft)	40	2025
Bavli Beresheet Tower	Tel Aviv	Bavli	Residential	158 m (518 ft)	45	2026
Kikar HaMedina Tower 1	Tel Aviv	Kikar Hamedina	Residential	156 m (512 ft)	42	2027
Kikar HaMedina Tower 2	Tel Aviv	Kikar Hamedina	Residential	156 m (512 ft)	42	2027
Kikar HaMedina Tower 3	Tel Aviv	Kikar Hamedina	Residential	156 m (512 ft)	42	2027
Vie Tower	Bat Yam		Office	155 m (509 ft)	44	
Rova Ayalon Tower 1	Bat Yam		Residential	152 m (499 ft)	45	
Rova Ayalon Tower 2	Bat Yam		Residential	152 m (499 ft)	45	
Rova Ayalon Tower 3	Bat Yam		Residential	152 m (499 ft)	45	
Benchmark Tower	Tel Aviv	Hassan Arafe Compound	Office		42	
Mazeh Tower	Tel Aviv	Hassan Arafe Compound	Residential		41	
YBox Gat Rimon Tower 1	Tel Aviv	Rothschild	Residential		41	
Metropolin Netanya	Netanya	Poleg Industrial Zone	Office		40	
YBox Begin	Tel Aviv	Hassan Arafe Compound	Mixed-use		40	

== Timeline of tallest buildings ==
Name	Image	City	Height (m)	Floors	Years as tallest
El Al Building		Tel Aviv	53	13	1963–1965
Shalom Meir Tower		Tel Aviv	120	34	1965–1987
Marganit Tower		Tel Aviv	137	17	1987–1999
Azrieli Center Circular Tower		Tel Aviv	187	49	1999–2001
Moshe Aviv Tower		Ramat Gan	235	68	2001–2017
Azrieli Sarona Tower		Tel Aviv	238	61	2017–2024
Beyond Office Tower		Givatayim	308	72	2024–present

== Tallest buildings by usage ==
The list below shows the tallest buildings by their usage. Note that the buildings in the list are considered only if the entire tower is for the usage listed; buildings with multiple usages aren't considered.

Use	Name	Image	City	Height (m)	Floors	Year
Office	Azrieli Sarona Tower		Tel Aviv	238	61	2017
Residential	Hi Tower		Givatayim	220	60	2024
Hotel	Island Luxurious Suites		Netanya	104	33	2011
Education	Eshkol Tower		Haifa	102		1963
Hospital	Helmsley Health Discovery Tower		Haifa	76		

== Tallest structures ==
The following is a list of all structures in Israel with a height greater than 100 m. A structure differs from a high-rise by its lack of floors and habitability.

Rank	Name	Image	City	Use	Height (m)	Year
1	Dimona Radar Facility (2 guyed masts)		Dimona	Radar	400	2009
2	Chimney 3 of Orot Rabin		Hadera	Energy generation	300	1997
3=	Chimney 1 of Orot Rabin		Hadera	Energy generation	265	1993
3=	Chimney 2 of Orot Rabin		Hadera	Energy generation	265	1993
5=	Ashalim solar power tower		Ashalim	Energy generation	250	2018
5=	Chimney 4 of Orot Rabin		Hadera	Energy generation	250	2017
5=	Chimneys of Rutenberg Power Station		Ashkelon	Energy generation	250	
8	Small Chimney of Rutenberg Power Station		Ashkelon	Energy generation	203	2014
9	Chimney of Reading Power Station		Tel Aviv	Energy generation	150	1962
10	Chords Bridge		Jerusalem	Bridge	118	2008

== See also ==
- List of tallest buildings in Tel Aviv
- List of tallest buildings in Ramat Gan
- List of tallest structures in the Middle East
- List of tallest buildings in Asia
