= Hi Tower =

Skyscrpaer in Tel-Aviv, Israel

- מגדל Hi Tower (Hebrew)
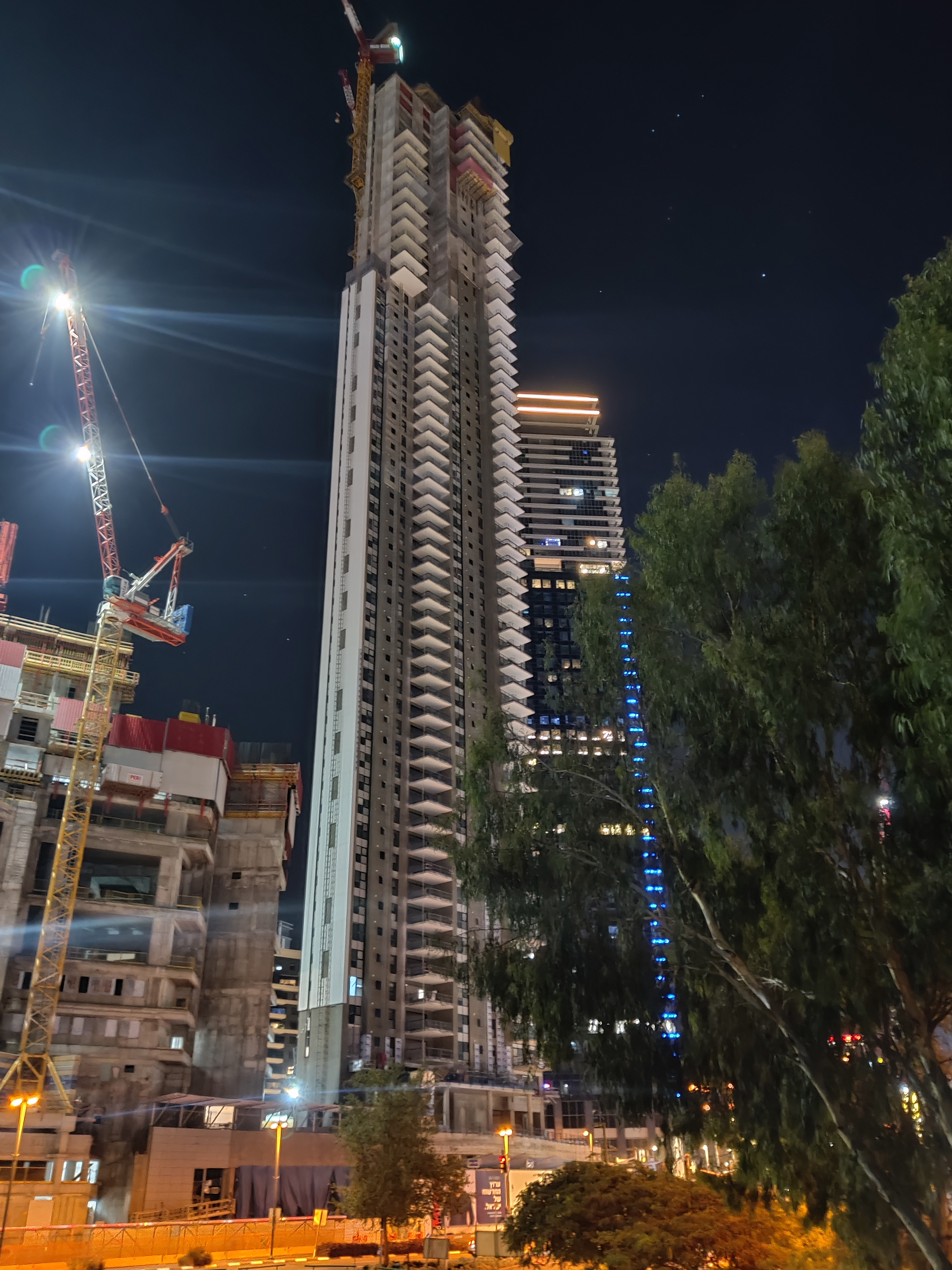
- Interactive map of the Hi Tower area

General information
- Status: Completed
- Type: Residential
- Location: Givatayim, Tel Aviv District, Israel, 10 Ariel Sharon Street, Givatayim
- Coordinates: 32.08025°N 34.80081°E
- Construction started: 2017
- Completed: 2024
- Opened: 2025

Height
- Roof: 226.7 m (744 ft)

Technical details
- Structural system: Concrete
- Floor count: 60 (+3 underground)
- Floor area: 55,500 m^{2} (597,000 sq ft)

Design and construction
- Architect: Yashar Architects
- Structural engineer: David Engineers
- Main contractor: ASHTROM GROUP LTD

The Hi Tower (Hebrew: מגדל Hi Tower) is a residential skyscraper in the Tel Aviv District city of Givatayim, Israel. The tower's construction was started in 2017 and completed in 2024. The tower stands at 226.7 m (744 ft) with 60 floors and is the current third tallest building in Israel.

== History ==
The building has 60 floors. The first levels house a lobby floor, a gallery floor and a welfare floor, above which are 55 residential floors displaying a total of 279 apartment units, and two additional technical floors at the top of the tower. Also, there are about 5 underground floors that will be used for parking. The tower sits together with the neighboring HaShahar Tower on a ramp raised from the street level below.

The tower was designed by Ishar Architects as part of the city complex that will include several other skyscrapers, and will integrate as a high-rise building sequence with the Diamond Exchange District in Ramat Gan and Yigal Alon Street in Tel Aviv. The promoters of the project are the businessman and real estate broker Roni Mana and the G-Group led by the businessman Guy Blushinsky. The Ashstrom Group is responsible for its execution.

At the beginning of 2022 it reached its final height, becoming the third tallest skyscraper in Israel and the tallest tower in Givatayim. It also holds the title of being the tallest residential tower in Israel. Its height from the main entrance floor to the edge of the roof is 220 meters. In accordance with the RTA requirement, upon its completion, a warning lighting system for aircraft was installed on the roof. The tower has a fitness center and a spa center.

=== Architecture ===
The construction of the tower began in March 2016 and ended in 2023. However, in September 2023, it was announced that although the construction of the tower was completed, the municipality of Givatayim does not approve its occupancy due to non-compliance with safety requirements. The building received an occupancy permit for the summer of 2024 and was occupied for the first time in July of that year.

== See also ==
- List of tallest buildings in Israel
