= Vision Tower (disambiguation) =

Vision Tower is the name for several buildings under construction including:

- Vision Tower (Dubai), also known as The Vision Tower, is an under-construction skyscraper in Dubai
- Vision Tower (Tel Aviv), a topped out skyscraper in Tel Aviv

== See also ==
- Vision Brisbane, a proposed skyscraper in Brisbane
