= Tel Aviv Towers =

Four skyscrapers in the city of Tel Aviv, Israel

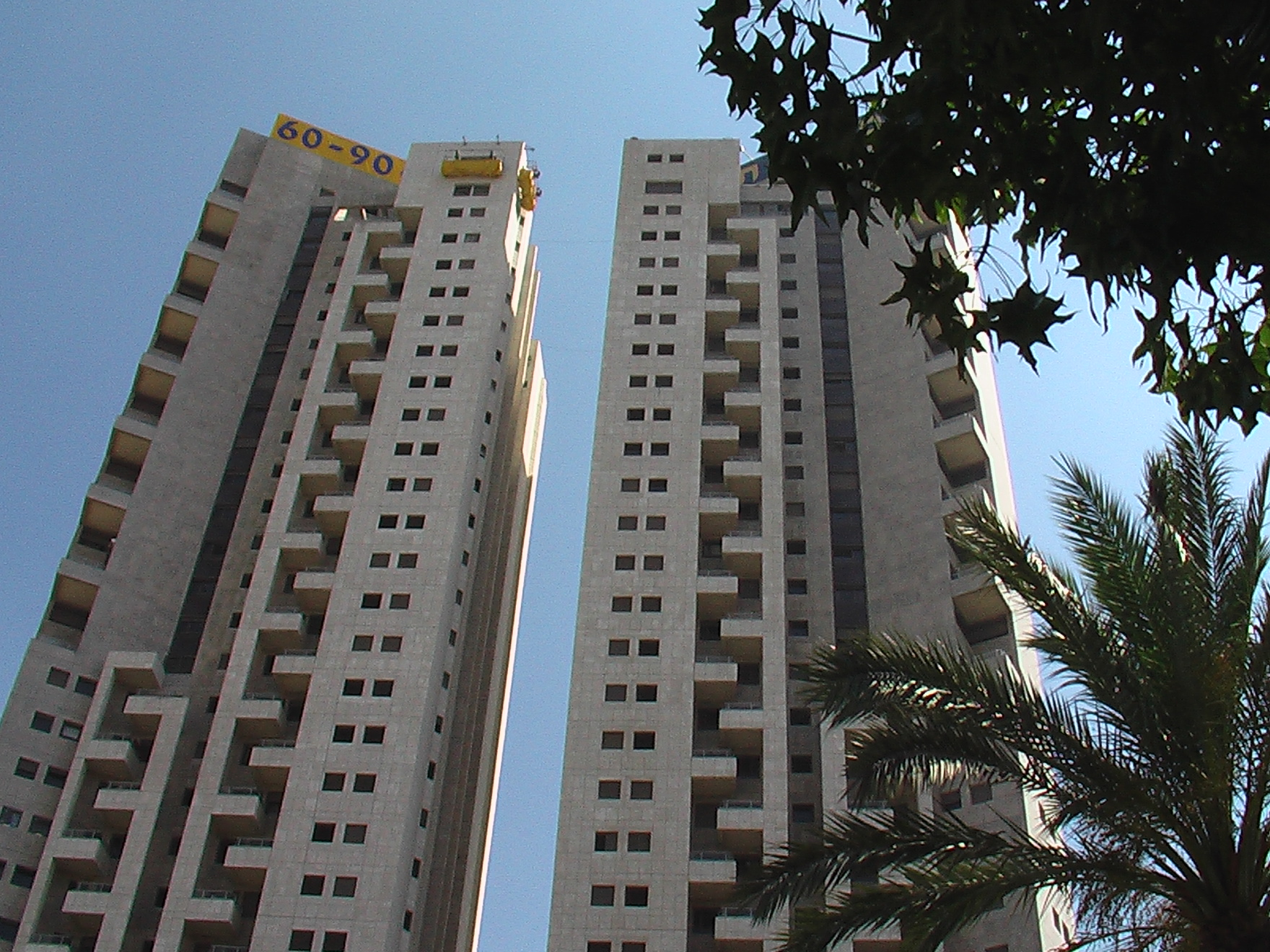
- Interactive map of the Tel Aviv Towers area

General information
- Status: 1-4: Completed
- Type: Residential
- Location: Tel Aviv, Israel מגדלי תל אביב
- Coordinates: 32°4′27″N 34°47′53″E
- Construction started: 1&2: 1998
- Opening: 1&2: 2000
- Cost: $100 million

Height
- Roof: 140 m (460 ft)

Technical details
- Floor count: 42
- Lifts/elevators: 4 per tower

Design and construction
- Architect: Riskin Architects

The Tel Aviv Towers are a complex of four skyscrapers in the city of Tel Aviv, Israel. All four buildings in the complex are complete. Towers 1 and 2 are each 107.75 meters in height, have 34 floors, and were built between 1998 and 2000. Each has 23,000 square metres of residential space and 225 apartments. The towers were designed by Riskin Architects. The original plan was to construct the four towers together.

The towers were shortly Israel's tallest residential buildings and tallest buildings with balconies.

== History ==
The towers were built on the site of the factory of the oil company "Yizhar". The Yizhar factory was established in the mid-1930s by a group of entrepreneurs who purchased land in the neighborhood and built a large factory for oil and related products such as soap. The factory employed hundreds of workers, some of them local residents, and gained a good reputation for its products over several decades of operation.

In 1989, the company Industrial Buildings Corporation purchased the land after the Yizhar factory encountered financial difficulties. At that time, the Yizhar company had already begun planning a construction project on the site.

In January 1997, the construction company S.A.F. won the Industrial Buildings Corporation tender to build the first stage of the project (the two northern towers) for 190 million shekels. Construction of the project began in late 1997, and the construction of the northern towers was completed in 2000.

Construction of the two southern towers began in 2010 as an initiative of a group purchase organized by the companies "Acro Real Estate" and "Hagag Group", and they were occupied in 2014.

== See also ==
- List of skyscrapers in Israel
- Architecture of Israel
