= Meier on Rothschild =

Coordinates: 32.0633°N 34.7733°E

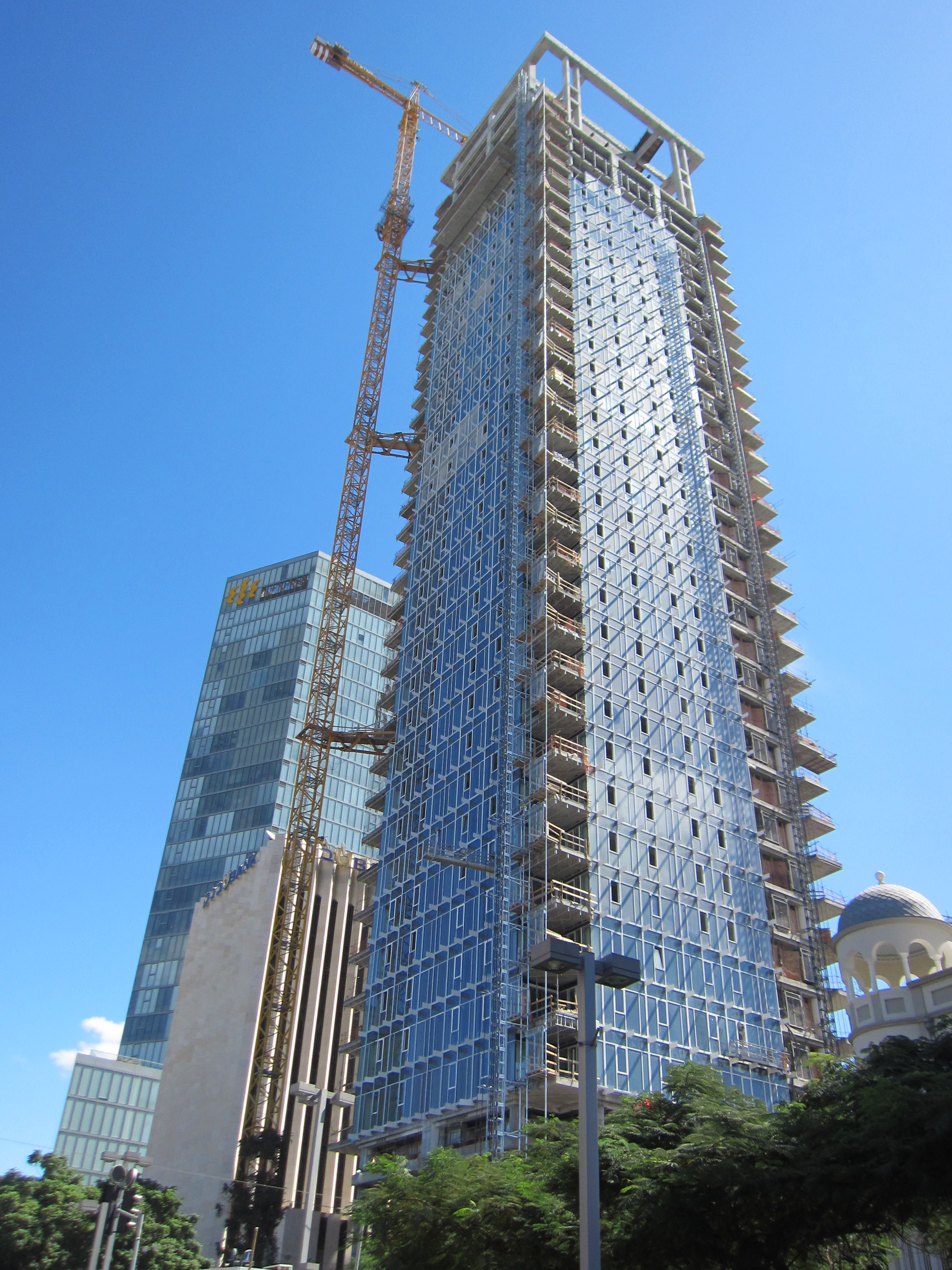
- Interactive map of the Meier on Rothschild area

General information
- Status: Completed
- Type: Residential
- Location: Tel Aviv, Israel
- Construction started: 2008
- Completed: 2014

Height
- Roof: 158 m (520 ft)

Technical details
- Floor count: 42

Design and construction
- Architect: Richard Meier
- Developer: Nicolas Berggruen

Meier on Rothschild is a skyscraper on Allenby Street in Tel Aviv, Israel. The tower is 158 meters (520 ft) and It is the second highest residential building in Israel after Nevve Nof Tower.

== Location ==
It is located on Rothschild Boulevard, with entrances on Allenby Street and Yavne Street in Tel Aviv.

== Characteristics ==
The tower was designed by architect Richard Meier and is named after him. Apart from the tower, the project also includes commercial areas facing Yavne and Allenby Street. The tower includes 37 floors that were built on a 2,900 square meter commercial center. In the base of the tower there is a six floor parking lot.

== History ==
The construction work started in 2008 by the original 27 floor plan as two office buildings in the spot were destroyed. In 2010 the plan was changed to build 32 floors. In May 2011 another change in the plan was approved and the tower was set to include 121 apartments on 37 floors and a final height of 158 meters.

In October 2011 it was reported that an apartment in the tower was sold to a Jewish Ukrainian business man for 200 million shekels, which was the most expensive apartment to be sold in Israel. The apartment includes the top three floors in the tower and covers 2,200 square meters.

== Gallery ==
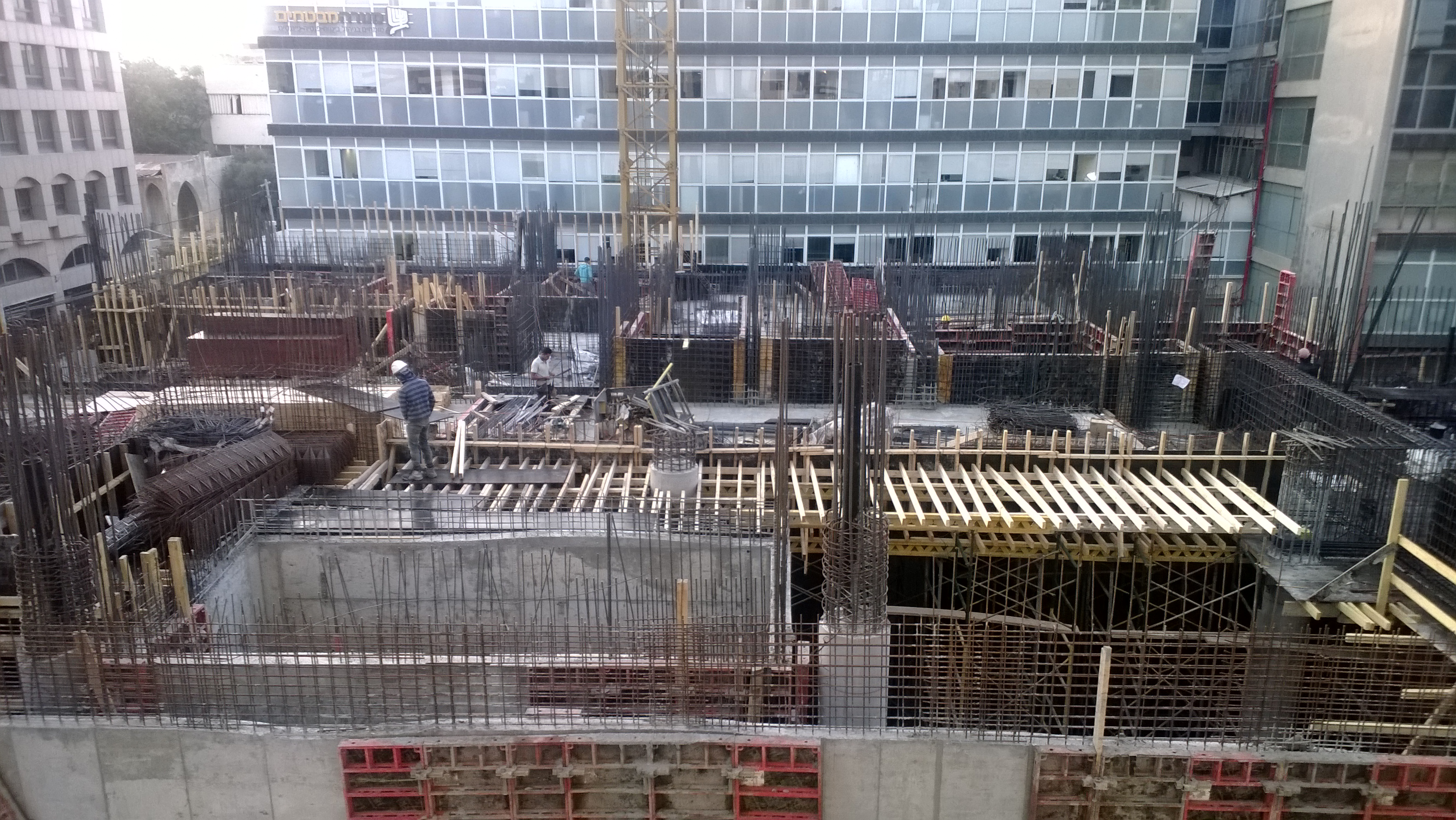
Meier on Rothschild under construction, October 2013
