= BSR Towers =

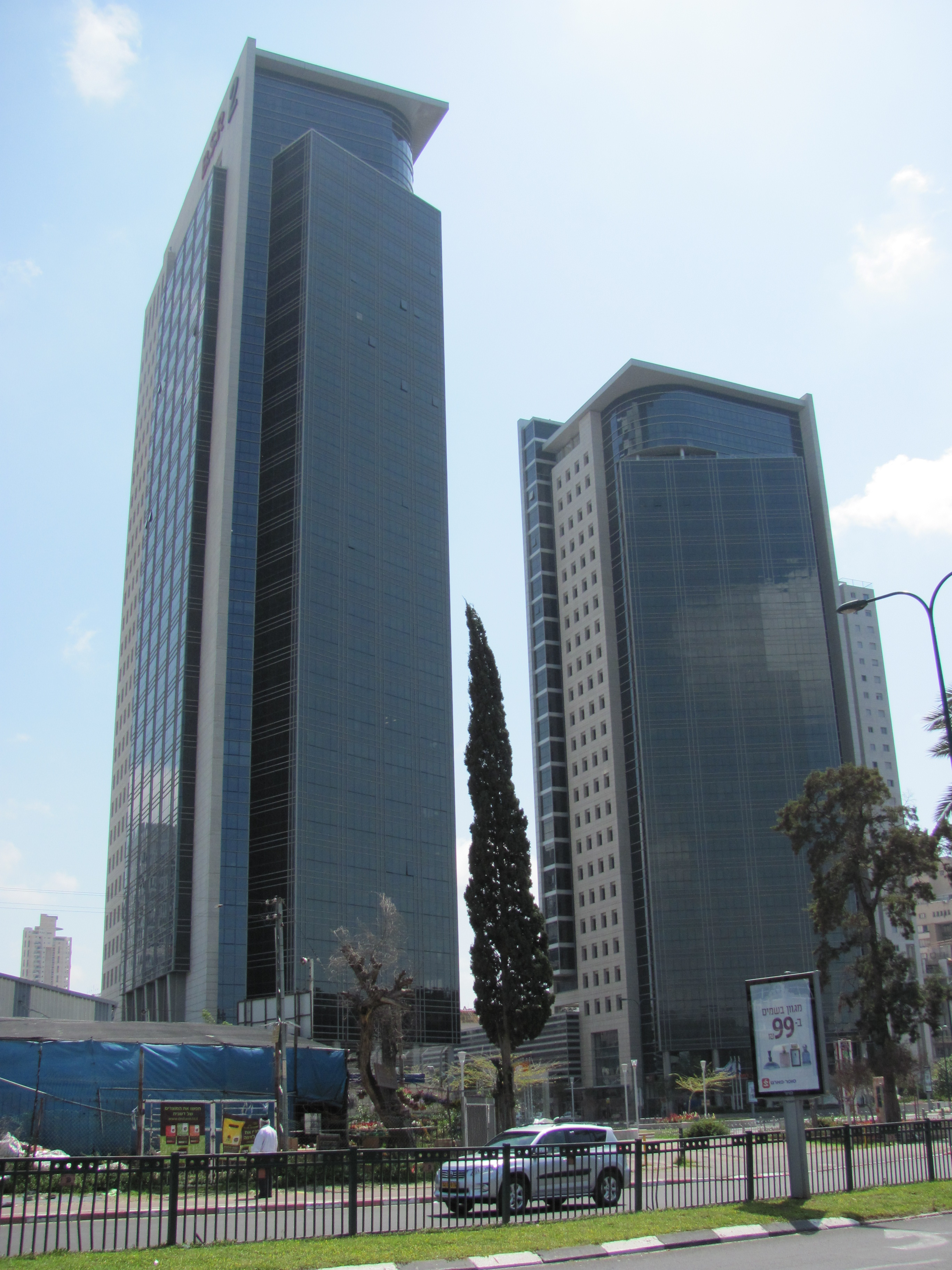
- Interactive map of the BSR Towers area

General information
- Status: in construction
- Type: Offices
- Location: 1 – Ramat Gan, Israel; 2 – Bnei Brak, Israel; 3 – Bnei Brak, Israel; 4 – Bnei Brak, Israel
- Coordinates: 32°5′45.64″N 34°49′19.49″E (Tower 2)
- Opening: 2004

Height
- Roof: Tower 1 – 98 m Tower 2 – 121 m

Technical details
- Floor count: Tower 1 – 24; Tower 2 – 30

Design and construction
- Architect: Moore Yaski Sivan Architects
- Developer: BSR Engineering & Development

The BSR Towers (Hebrew: מגדלי ב.ס.ר.) are a complex of four towers, two built on opposite sides of Ben Gurion Road, dividing the cities of Bnei Brak and Ramat Gan in Tel Aviv District, Israel, and a third building completed in 2012 on Kinneret Street. Tower 1 is located in Ramat Gan and stands at 98 meters over 24 floors, whilst Tower 2 stands at 121 meters, thus being the tallest building in Bnei Brak with 30 floors. Both buildings were completed in 2004, and were designed by Moore Architects, and subsequently Moore Yaski Sivan Architects after a merger between Moore and Yaski–Sivan. Towers 3 and 4 are inside Bnei Brak.

== See also ==
- List of skyscrapers in Israel
- Architecture of Israel
