= First International Bank Tower =

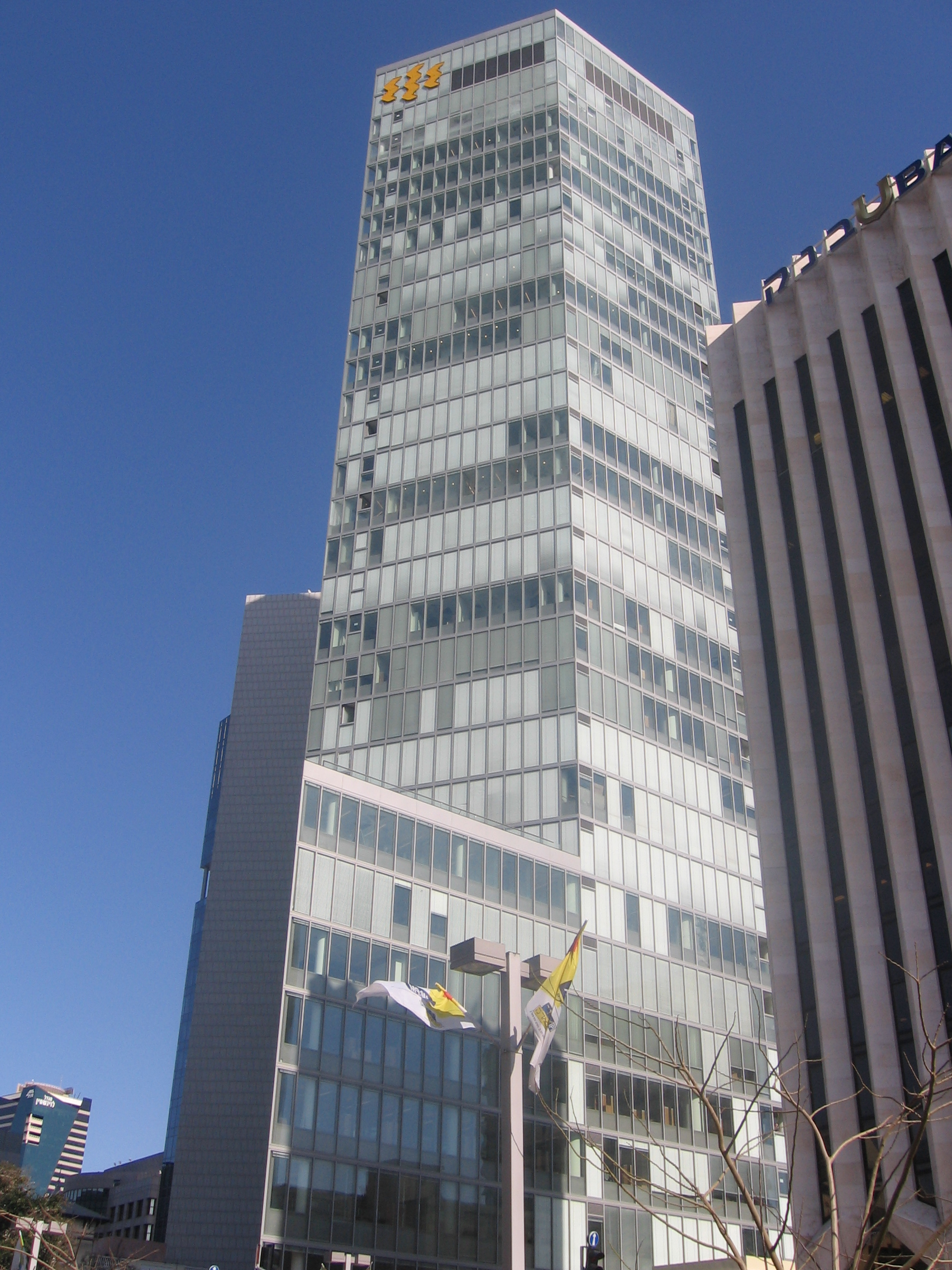
- Interactive map of the First International Bank Tower area

General information
- Status: Completed
- Type: Offices
- Location: Tel Aviv, Israel
- Coordinates: 32°3′49″N 34°46′27″E
- Construction started: 2003
- Completed: 2009

Height
- Roof: 132 m (433 ft)

Technical details
- Floor count: 32

Design and construction
- Architects: Pei Cobb Freed & Partners; Nir-Kuts Architects; Amnon Bar Or Architects
- Structural engineer: S. Ben-Abraham Engineers

The First International Bank Tower is a 32-story skyscraper on Rothschild Boulevard in the center of Tel Aviv, Israel. At 132 meters in height over 32 floors, the tower is Israel's 22nd tallest building. It was designed by Pei Cobb Freed & Partners, Nir-Kuts Architects, and Amnon Bar Or Architects. Inspired by the Bank of China Tower in Hong Kong, it was primarily designed by the same architectural firm.

Construction of the tower began in early 2003, after the plans were approved in October 2002. The plans were restricted in height due to the need to preserve and rebuild two historical neighbouring low-rises of Bauhaus architecture which were given UNESCO World Heritage Status. Included in the design scheme is a public plaza on Rothschild Boulevard. The main occupant of the tower is the First International Bank of Israel. The tower is the first green tower in Israel, and also the first to feature a double curtain wall system.

The design of the tower consists of 5 equilateral triangular prisms, set on top of each other at different heights, creating 3 large balconies for the building's occupants. Each prism ends after 8 stories at a different height, correlating to the heights of adjacent buildings and monuments.

== See also ==
- List of skyscrapers in Israel
- Architecture of Israel
- Economy of Israel
