= Lyfe Towers =

Skyscrpaer complex in Bnei Brak, Israel

- מגדל Lyfe (Hebrew)
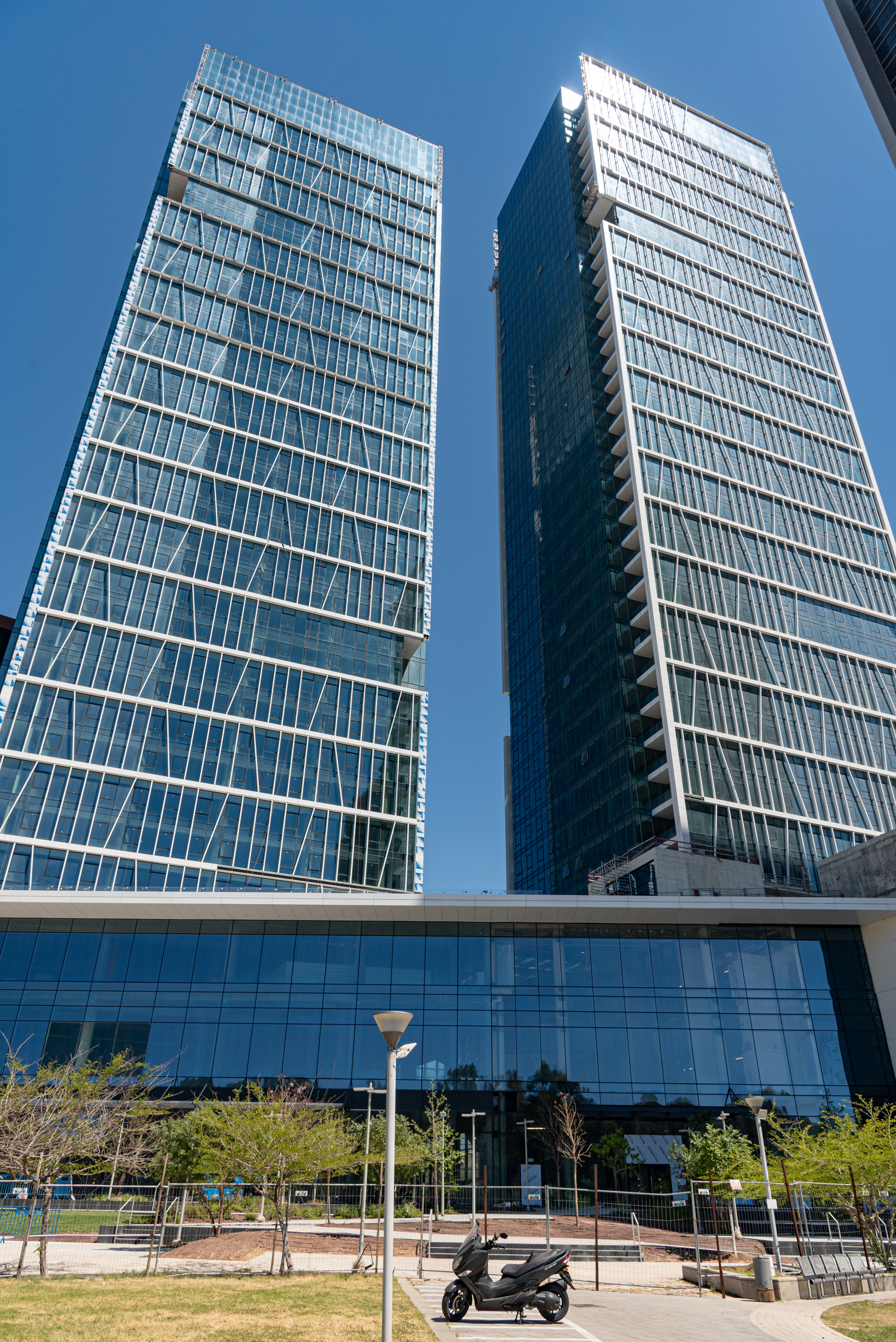

General information
- Status: Completed
- Type: Office
- Location: Bnei Brak, Tel Aviv District, Israel, 4 Sheshet Hayamim Street, Bnei Brak, Israel
- Coordinates: 32.09688°N 34.82284°E
- Construction started: 2018
- Completed: 2022

Height
- Roof: 175 m (574 ft) (Tower B); 160 m (520 ft) (Tower A)

Technical details
- Structural system: Concrete
- Floor count: 42 (Tower B); 37 (Tower A)

Design and construction
- Developer: Ashtrom Group
- Structural engineer: David Engineers; Waxman Govrin Geva Engineering

Website
- Lyfe Complex

The Lyfe Towers is an office skyscraper complex in Tel Aviv District city of Bnei Brak, Israel. Built between 2018 and 2022, the complex consists of two twin towers slightly different in height, standing at 175 m (574 ft) with 42 floors (Tower B) respectively 160 m (520 ft) with 37 floors (Tower A), with the taller one currently being the 10th tallest building in Israel.

== History ==
=== Architecture ===
The building complex has been created and managed by the Israeli company of Dan Real Estate and Ashtrom Properties which sold the entire ensamble for 1.6 billion NIS. Large companies such as Waxman Guvrin Geva, Gabay Group or Israel Land Company, Yifat Group and Clalit Health Insurance have rented spaces summing up to approximately 2,000 m^{2} (21,500 sq ft) each.

The initiative encompasses about 16 dunams in the Bnei Brak employment zone (BBC). Within its structure, two towers of 34 and 36 stories (in buildings A+B) were constructed, intended for office and commercial use. At this point, around 105 thousand square meters of office space have been sold, and the offices are operating at full capacity. Subsequently, the third tower (C) will be constructed, reaching about 44 stories in height and encompassing around 90,000 square meters of gross area, designated as a rental office building. The overall constructed space of the towers and retail areas will exceed 200 thousand square meters.

The project's advantageous position is a notable benefit for those visiting the complex, as it is linked to key traffic routes, and in the future, the red line of the light rail will run nearby.

== Buildings ==
Name	Image	Height m (ft)	Floors	Function	Ref
Tower B		175 m (574 ft)	42	Office	
Tower A		160 m (520 ft)	37	Office	
Tower C		N/A (on hold)	44	Office	

== See also ==
- List of tallest buildings in Israel
