= Levinstein Tower =

Skyscraper in Tel Aviv, Israel

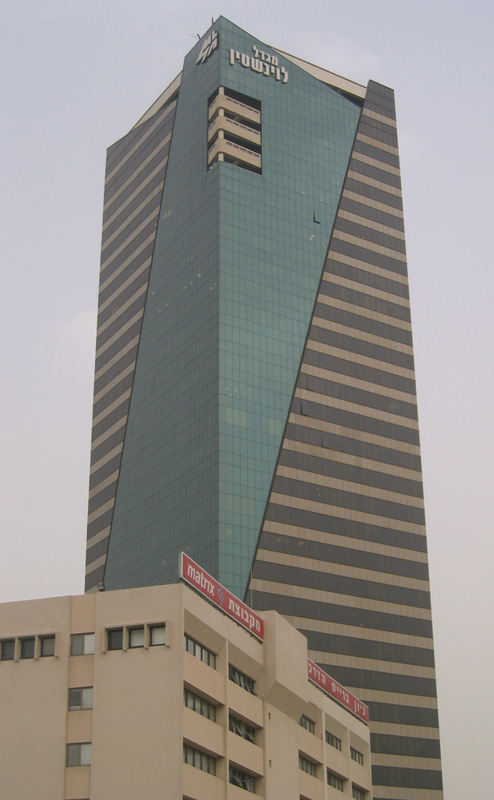
- Interactive map of the Levinstein Tower area

General information
- Status: Completed
- Location: Tel Aviv, Israel
- Coordinates: 32°3′50″N 34°46′47″E
- Construction started: 1997
- Opening: 2000

Height
- Roof: 125 m (410 ft)

Technical details
- Floor count: 35
- Lifts/elevators: 11

Design and construction
- Architect: Rapoport Architects
- Developer: Meshulam Levinstein Group

The Levinstein Tower is a skyscraper in Tel Aviv, Israel. At 125 metres in height, the tower has 35 floors. The tower was designed by Rapoport Architects, and was completed in 2000 drawing inspiration in its design from the Century Tower in the city.

Originally, the tower was set to be a 74 metre tall, 17-storey tower, although this changed to a 35 floor tower, with 5 residential storeys at the top, with a total height of 145 metres. These were dropped, however, due to a lack of demand for luxury apartments at the time. Each floor in the tower is 1000 square metres in size, with the ground floor having a double-height 1,500 square metre lobby.

== See also ==
- Architecture of Israel
- Economy of Israel
- List of skyscrapers in Israel
