= Neve Tzedek Tower =

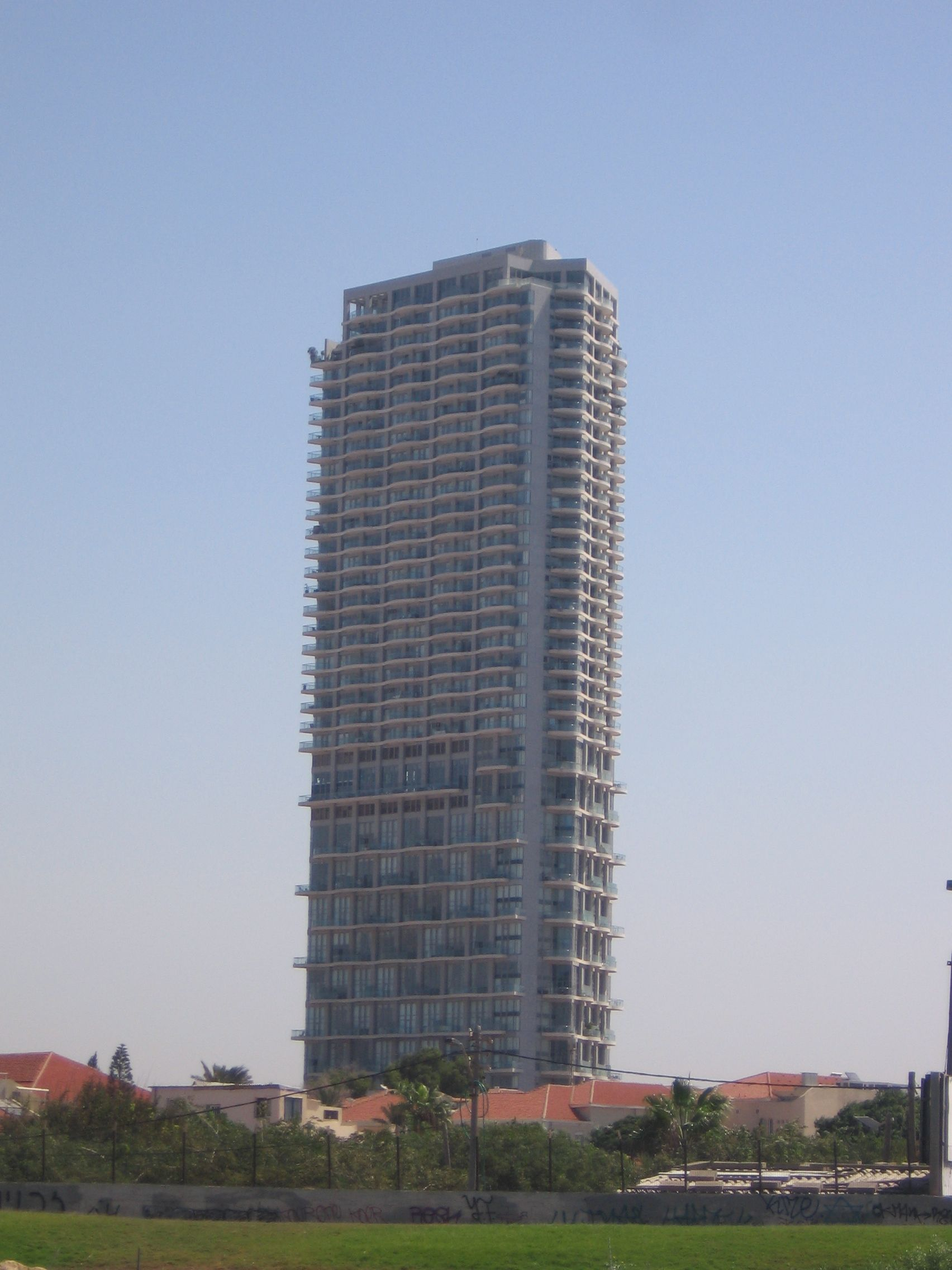
- Interactive map of the Neve Tzedek Tower area

General information
- Status: Completed
- Type: Apartments
- Location: Tel Aviv, Israel
- Coordinates: 32°3′34.89″N 34°46′0.11″E
- Construction started: 2003
- Opening: 2007
- Cost: $90 million

Height
- Roof: 147 m (482 ft)

Technical details
- Floor count: 44

Design and construction
- Architects: Gabai Architecture & Building

Neve Tzedek Tower (Hebrew: מגדל נווה צדק) is a residential skyscraper in the city of Tel Aviv, Israel.

== History ==
Neve Tzedek Tower is located on the border of Neve Tzedek, Tel Aviv's oldest district. It is one of the tallest residential building in Israel, at 147 meters in height, with over 44 floors. The tower contains 300 apartments and was completed in 2007. It is taller than typical apartment buildings because some of the floors have loft units with greater floor-to-ceiling heights. Each floor is approximately 850 square metres in size and contains between three and thirteen apartments. On the tenth floor of the tower there is an indoor swimming pool and a private gym. The tower was designed by Gabai Architecture & Building.

The Tower is located on 61 Eilat street, Tel Aviv.
