= Nimrodi Tower =

Skyscrpaer in Bnei Brak, Israel

- מגדל נמרודי (Hebrew)
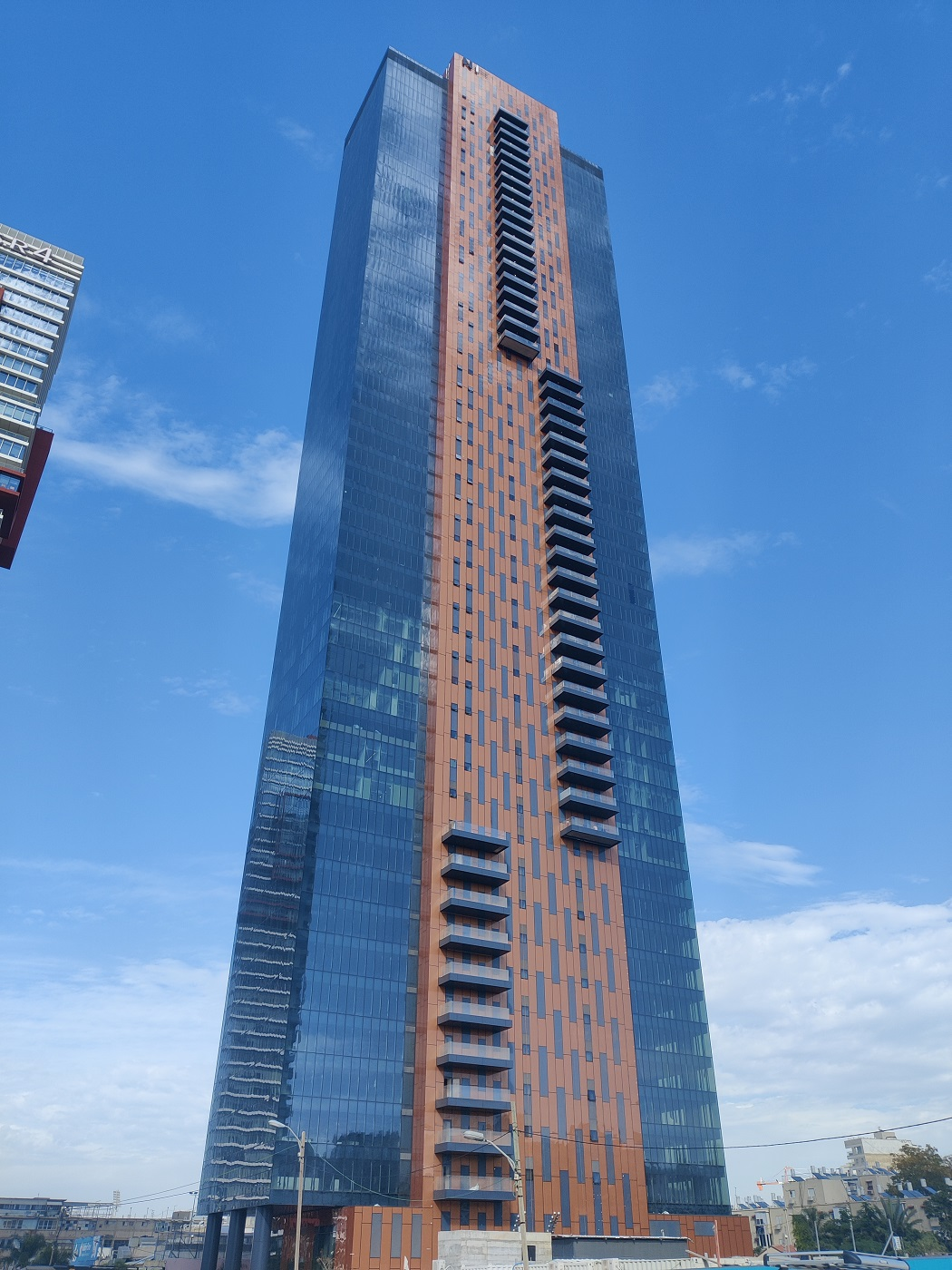
- Interactive map of the Nimrodi Tower area

General information
- Status: Completed
- Type: Office
- Location: Bnei Brak, Tel Aviv District, Israel, 3 HaHashmona'im St, Bnei Brak
- Coordinates: 32.09367°N 34.82575°E
- Construction started: 2020
- Completed: 2023

Height
- Roof: 211.3 m (693 ft)

Technical details
- Structural system: Concrete
- Floor count: 52 (+4 underground)

Design and construction
- Architects: Barre-Levie Architects & Urban Planners
- Developer: Israel Land Development Company; Ofer Nimrodi
- Structural engineer: David Engineers
- Main contractor: Omer Construction & Engineering; Afcon Group

The Nimrodi Tower (Hebrew: מגדל נמרודי), also known as the Seven Stars Tower, is an office skyscraper in the Tel Aviv District city of Bnei Brak, Israel. Built between 2020 and 2023, the tower stands at 211.3 m (693 ft) with 52 floors and is the current 5th tallest building in Israel.

== History ==
Nimrodi Tower is located in the BBC complex in Bnei Brak and is part of a project by the Yishuv Training Company that includes three buildings. The tower, whose construction began in 2018, has 55 floors and rises to a height of 211 meters. When the roof casting of the building was completed at the end of 2021, it reached its final height and became the tallest skyscraper in Bnei Brak and the fourth tallest in Israel after the Azrieli Sarona Tower, the Moshe Aviv Tower, and the High Tower residential building. Its construction was completed at the beginning of 2023.

=== Architecture ===
41 of the 52 commercial floors of the tower (from the tenth floor to the 51st floor) are owned by the settlement training company. Its total area sums up to 64,000 square meters, where the area of each floor is 1,250 square meters. The tower includes four underground floors used for parking. Most of its space is allocated to offices, except for a small part in the lobby of the building which will be allocated to commerce. A gym will operate on the tenth floor.

The tower was designed by Bar Levy architects and urban planners and is designed in the shape of a rectangular box with a high ratio between the width of the side, the width of the face and the height. The core in the center is copper colored and the other parts of the tower are covered with dark glass. The design of the tower, its colors and the width of its relatively narrow side are intended to give it a unique and transformative appearance and make it stand out in the crowded environment.

The tower is the second building built in the settlement training project in the city and the northernmost in it. The first building built in the project is the southern tower – the settlement training tower, the construction of which was completed in 2019. The last building, which is in the early stages of construction, will be located between them. It should include 20 floors on an area of 57,000 square meters, and serve as a medical center that includes a geriatric hospital and a rehabilitation institute.

== See also ==
- List of tallest buildings in Israel
