= Uptown Tower (Bat Yam) =

Skyscrpaer in Bat Yam, Israel

- מגדלי אפטאון (Hebrew)
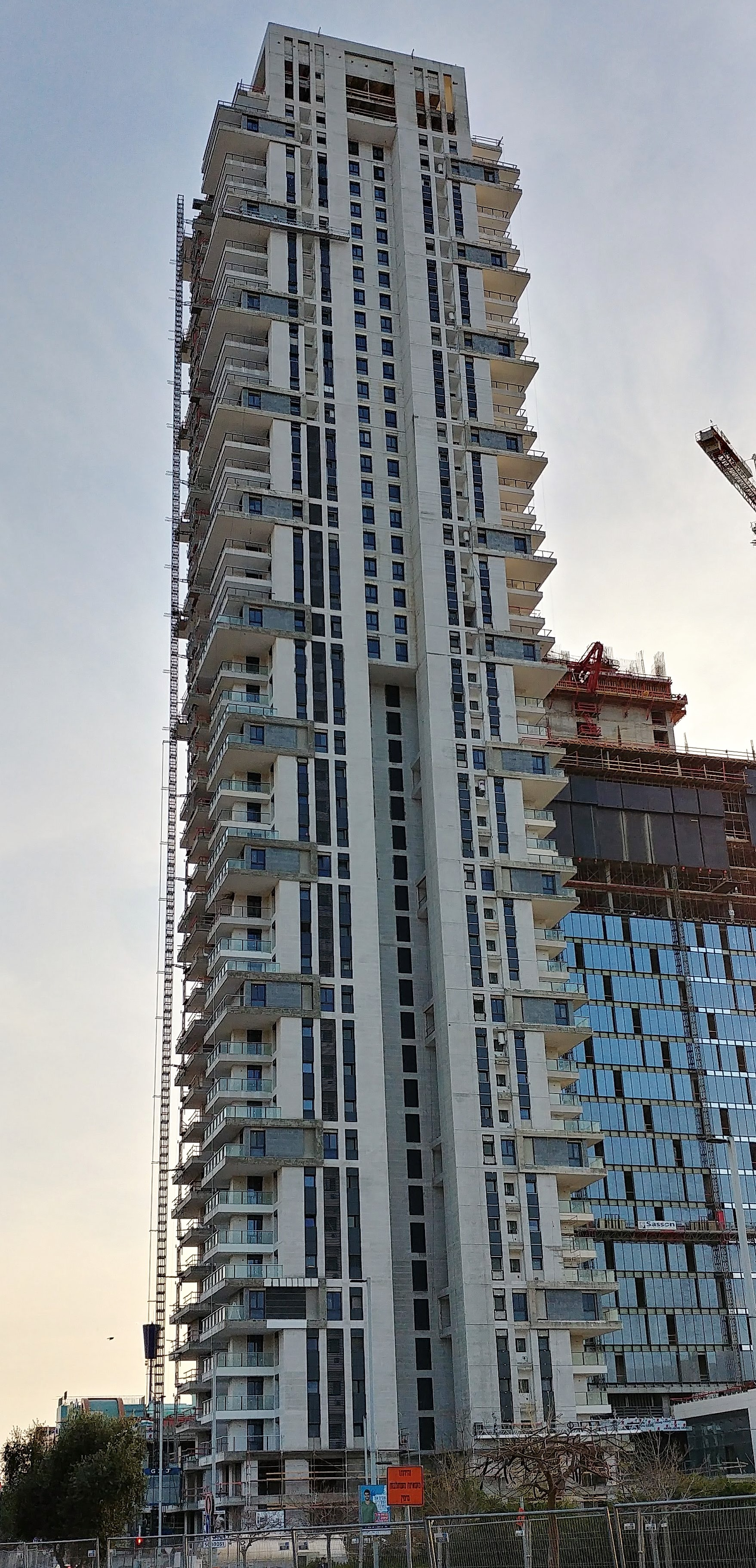

General information
- Status: Topped-out
- Type: Residential
- Location: Bat Yam, Tel Aviv District, Israel, Ehud Kinnamon St 5-9
- Coordinates: 32.01333°N 34.75222°E
- Construction started: 2013
- Completed: 2017

Height
- Roof: 162 m (531 ft)

Technical details
- Structural system: Reinforced concrete
- Floor count: 48

Design and construction
- Architect: Yasky Mor Sivan
- Developer: N.d.N. Marketing Ltd.
- Main contractor: Ortam-Sahar

The Uptown Tower (Hebrew: מגדלי אפטאון) is a residential skyscraper in the Tel Aviv District city of Bat Yam, Israel. Built between 2020 and 2022, the tower stands at 162 m (531 ft) with 48 floors and is the current 21st tallest building in Israel.

== History ==
The Uptown Towers are a pair of skyscrapers in Bat Yam, whose construction began in 2014 as part of an urban renewal project. The complex of buildings is a focal point for urban renewal in Bat Yam, combining residences, offices and commercial services. The tallest tower in the complex, which is 162 meters high and has 50 floors, is intended for residential use and includes 184 apartments. The second tower, which is 126.73 meters high and has 34 floors, is used for offices and residences, with 71 apartments built on the upper floors after converting office space to residences.

The project was carried out by Danya Cebus at the initiative of entrepreneur Moshe Aharoni. The complex is part of a municipal plan to convert an industrial area to mixed-use, including a total of 255 housing units, and is adjacent to the Red Line of the light rail.

The complex has a commercial center with an area of approximately 9,000 square meters, where the first three floors are designated for commerce, including a supermarket of the" Yochananoff" chain that opened in August 2018. The parking lot includes 6 floors, with a division between the tower residents and the general public.

== See also ==
- List of tallest buildings in Israel
