= Champion Motors Tower =

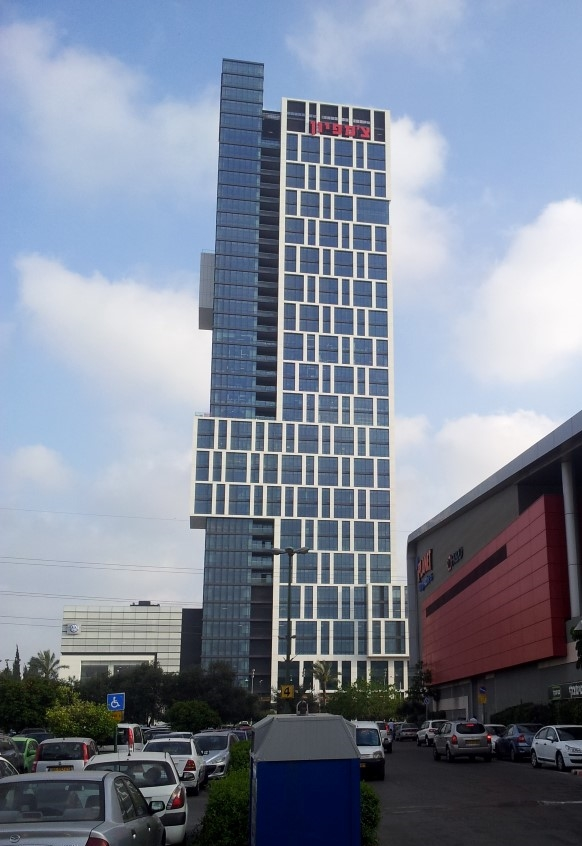
- Interactive map of the Champion Motors Tower area

General information
- Status: Completed
- Type: Office
- Location: Bnei Brak, Tel Aviv District, Israel
- Coordinates: 32.0983°N 34.8280°E
- Completed: 2013

Height
- Roof: 160 m (525 ft)

Technical details
- Floor count: 40

Champion Motors Tower is a 40-floor skyscraper located on ‘Sheshet Hayamim’ street in the Tel Aviv District city of Bnei Brak, Israel. The tower is 160 meters high (525 ft) and when it opened in 2013 it was the fifth tallest building in Israel. The tower is a part of the Bnei Brak Business Center. It is called hugging buildings, due to the visual appearance of hugging.

== Characteristics and history ==
The site on which the tower was built was formerly a car lot owned by the ‘Champion Motors’ company, an Israeli importer for automobile manufacturers such as Audi, Volkswagen, Seat and Skoda. In 2009, the company's activity was transferred to other sites and a new service center was established in Petah Tikva. At first there was a plan to build a 16-floor tower for ‘Champion Motors’, but later in 2011, almost a year after the construction started, the design was changed to a 40-floor tower.

The project's floor space includes about 50,000 square meters built on an 8,000 square meter field. Underground there are five floors of parking, and at street level there are car showrooms for Audi, Volkswagen, Seat and Skoda. The rest of the tower is used for offices.

In 2011, during construction, the insurance company Migdal purchased a one-third interest in the tower for 70 million shekels and became a partner in the funding of the construction.

The building received minor damage and was evacuated in the 2023 Turkey–Syria earthquake.

== See also ==
- List of tallest buildings in Israel
