= Dan Center Tower =

Skyscrpaer in Bnei Brak, Israel

- מגדל BBC (Hebrew)
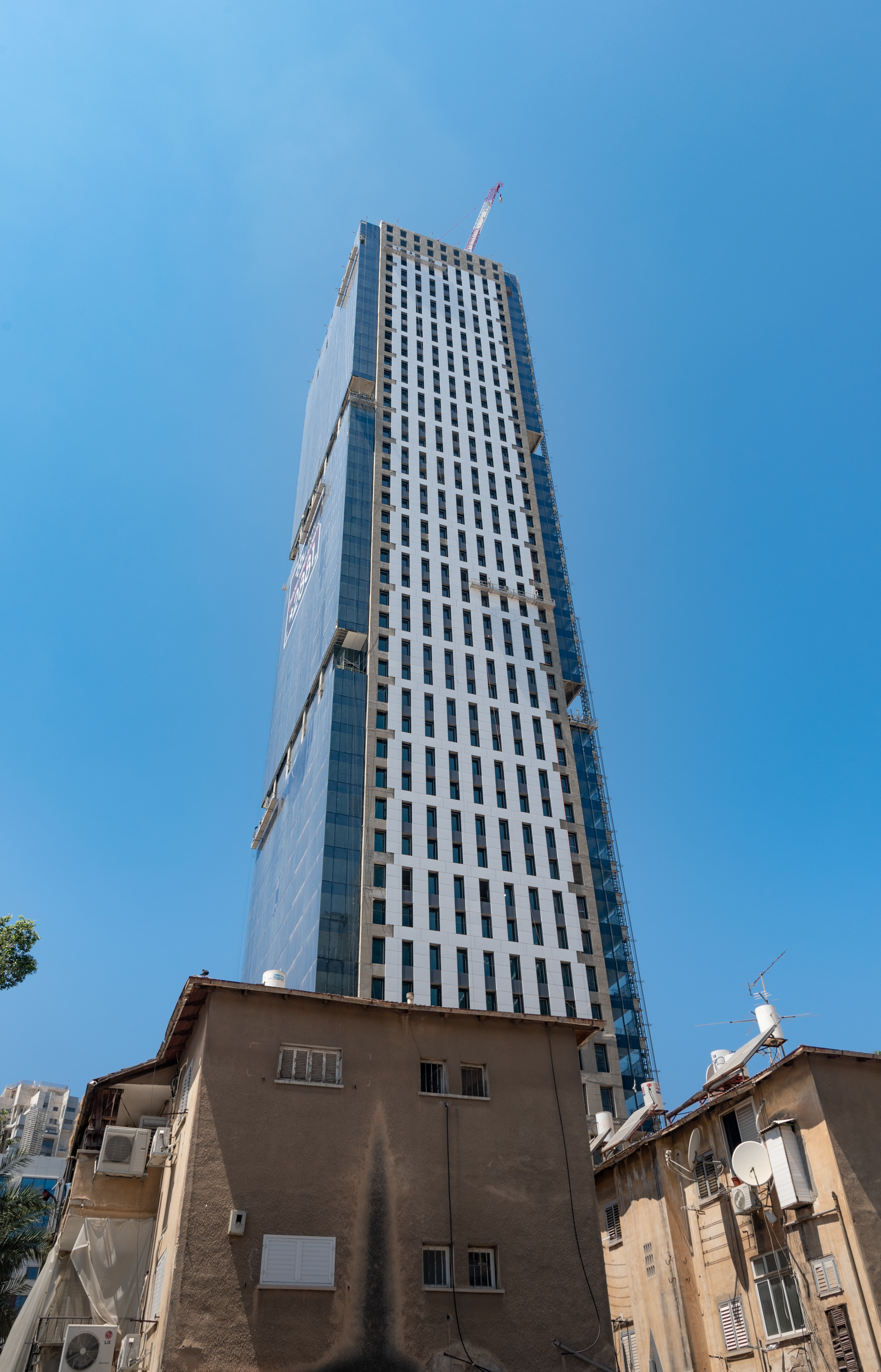

General information
- Status: Completed
- Type: Office
- Location: Bnei Brak, Tel Aviv District, Israel, 21 Ben Gurion St, Bnei Brak, Israel
- Coordinates: 32.09153°N 34.82294°E
- Construction started: 1995
- Completed: 2023

Height
- Roof: 187 m (614 ft)

Technical details
- Structural system: Concrete
- Floor count: 44

Design and construction
- Architect: Feigin Architects
- Developer: Amirim Developers
- Main contractor: Elhar Engineering Construction

The Dan Center Tower (Hebrew: מגדל BBC) also known as the BBC Central Tower is an office skyscraper in Tel Aviv District city of Bnei Brak, Israel. Built between 1995 and 2023, the tower stands at 187 m (614 ft) tall with 44 floors and is the current 8th tallest building in Israel.

== History ==
The building is located at the intersection of Jabotinsky and Ben-Gurion Streets of Bnei Brak, near the city border with Ramat Gan in the BBC - Bnei Brak Business complex Center and is located on the Ben-Gurion light rail station, the red line. The construction of the tower began in 1995 and due to the many delays in its completion, it was nicknamed " the white elephant of Bnei Brak.

The complex where the tower was built was used as a vegetable warehouse for the Tnuva company. In the early 1990s, after the complex was vacated, Tnuva sold the area to the businessmen brothers Zion and Yehuda Shaulian, who in 1995 signed a large real estate project in the area of the complex called "Midgal Merkaz Dan" with a group of entrepreneurs. After a few years, following a dispute A dispute arose between the brothers and the other entrepreneurs, and the construction of the tower was suspended.

In 2000, a receiver was appointed and in 2007 The stalled project was purchased by the companies Amirit and Elront who formed a partnership to complete the construction of the tower, but this partnership also fell apart and another receiver was appointed in 2013. Due to the 16 years in which the bare concrete foundations of the tower stood without construction, the nickname "The White Elephant of Bani" stuck to it lightning". During this period, a sign "Slander does not speak to me" was hung on him as a proclamation at the entrance to the ultra-orthodox city.

In 2016, an auction was held for the sale of the project, which was won by the ultra-orthodox businessmen Shuki Sharon, Yehuda Amar, Yaakov Brunner and his brother Israel, who bought the land rights for NIS 223 million and changed the name of the project to BBC Tower. In 2019, the Migdal insurance company purchased 75% of the office tower and is expected to own 30 of the 44 floors in the tower. On November 30, 2019, the renewed work on the tower began. At the beginning of 2022, the tower reached its final height of 187 meters, As part of the construction process that ended at the end of 2023.

=== Architecture ===
At the beginning of 2022, the tower reached its final height, becoming the seventh tallest skyscraper in Israel. The tower rises to a height of 187 meters and includes 40 office floors built over 5 commercial floors and two additional technical floors at the top of the building. The office floors are built on an area of approximately 44,000 square meters, while the commercial floors will be used as a shopping mall with an area of approximately 22,000 square meters. The total area of the floors in the tower is about 66 thousand square meters.

Its construction was completed in 2023, the year of the inauguration of the Ben-Gurion light rail station adjacent to the tower.

== See also ==
- List of tallest buildings in Israel
