= Beyond Towers =

Skyscraper in Givatayim, Israel

- Beyond מִגְדָּלֵי (Hebrew)
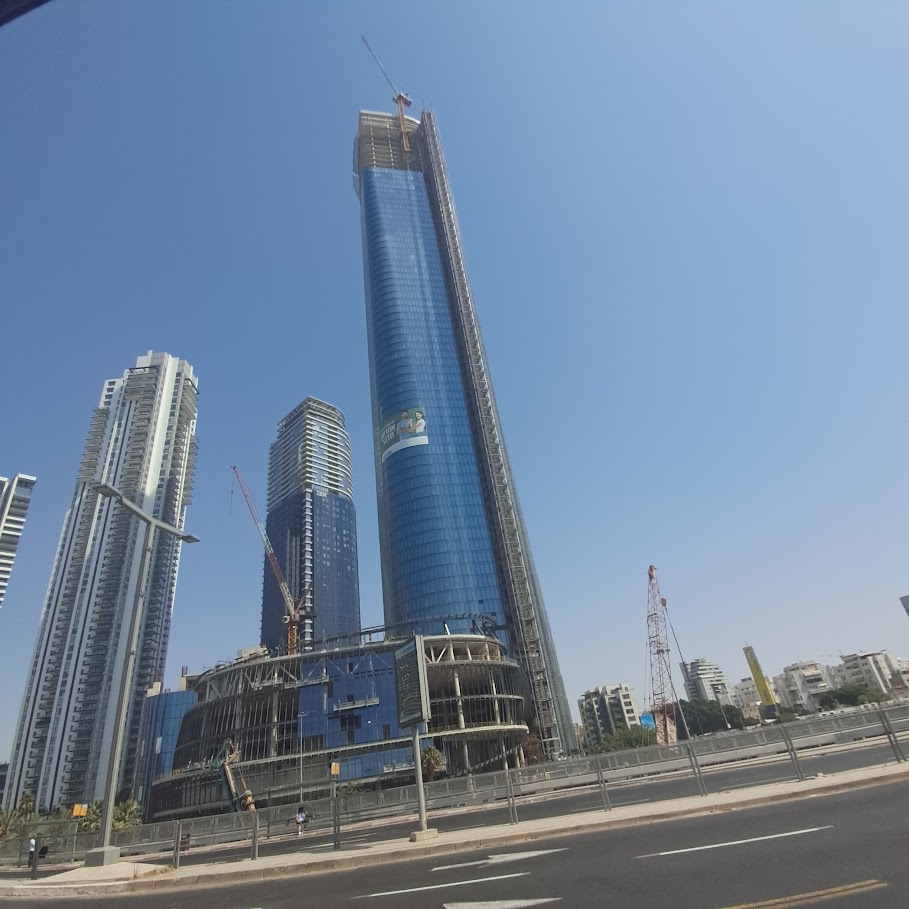

General information
- Status: Topped-out
- Type: Mixed-use: Office, Residential
- Location: Givatayim, Tel Aviv District, Israel, 1 Ariel Sharon Street, Givatayim
- Coordinates: 32.08033°N 34.79890°E
- Construction started: 2021
- Completed: 2026
- Owner: Tidhar Investments

Height
- Roof: 308.3 m (1,011 ft) (Office Tower)

Technical details
- Structural system: Concrete
- Floor count: 72 (Office Tower); 50 (Residential Tower)
- Floor area: 300,000 m^{2} (3,230,000 sq ft)

Design and construction
- Architect: Bareli Levitsky Kasif Architects
- Structural engineer: David Engineers

Website
- www.zuznadlan.co.il/towers/מגדל-ביונד/

The Beyond Towers (Hebrew: מִגְדָּלֵי Beyond) (also known as the Tsofen Givatayim Complex) is a mixed-use skyscraper complex under construction in the Tel Aviv District city of Givatayim, Israel. Started in 2021, the complex consists of two main towers, an office building standing at 308.3 m (1,011 ft) tall with 72 floors, and a residential building with 50 floors. The office tower has been topped out and is the current tallest building in Tel Aviv's metropolitan area and in Israel subsequently.

== History ==
Construction work began on the southern building (office tower), which was the first one planned to be constructed in the first phase of the project, in 2019. The building, which will be the taller of the two, will have 72 floors and a total of 130,000 m^{2} (1,400,000 sq ft) of office space, and will rise to a height of 308.3 m (1,011 ft). It will be the first tower in Israel to cross the 300-meter mark and is expected to be the tallest skyscraper in Israel until the completion of the Spiral Tower in Tel Aviv, which will be 28.5 meters taller.

As part of the second phase, the north tower (residential tower) will be constructed, which will have 50 floors, including a total of about 500 small apartments that will be available for long-term rental and will be intended for small households such as young couples, single tenants and the elderly population. In addition, shopping and leisure centers, medical clinics, a sports center, an elevated park, and a large parking lot will be built that will include bicycle parking spaces and charging stations for electric vehicles.

The project will cover a total area of 300,000 m^{2} (3,230,000 sq ft).

Construction work is expected to be completed in 2026 with the completion of the second phase and the occupancy of the pair of towers.

The towers were planned and designed by the firm of Bareli Levitsky Kasif Architects. The project's developers are Tidhar Construction Company, Union Company, the KKL-JNF subsidiary Himnuta and Attorney Doron Kochavi. The building's envelope was designed and executed by Aluminum Construction Group.

In September 2024, with the completion of the 60th floor, the South Tower surpassed the Azrieli Sarona Tower in height and became the tallest tower in Israel. In early 2025, it was topped out as it reached its final height and officially became the tallest building in Israel.

== Gallery ==
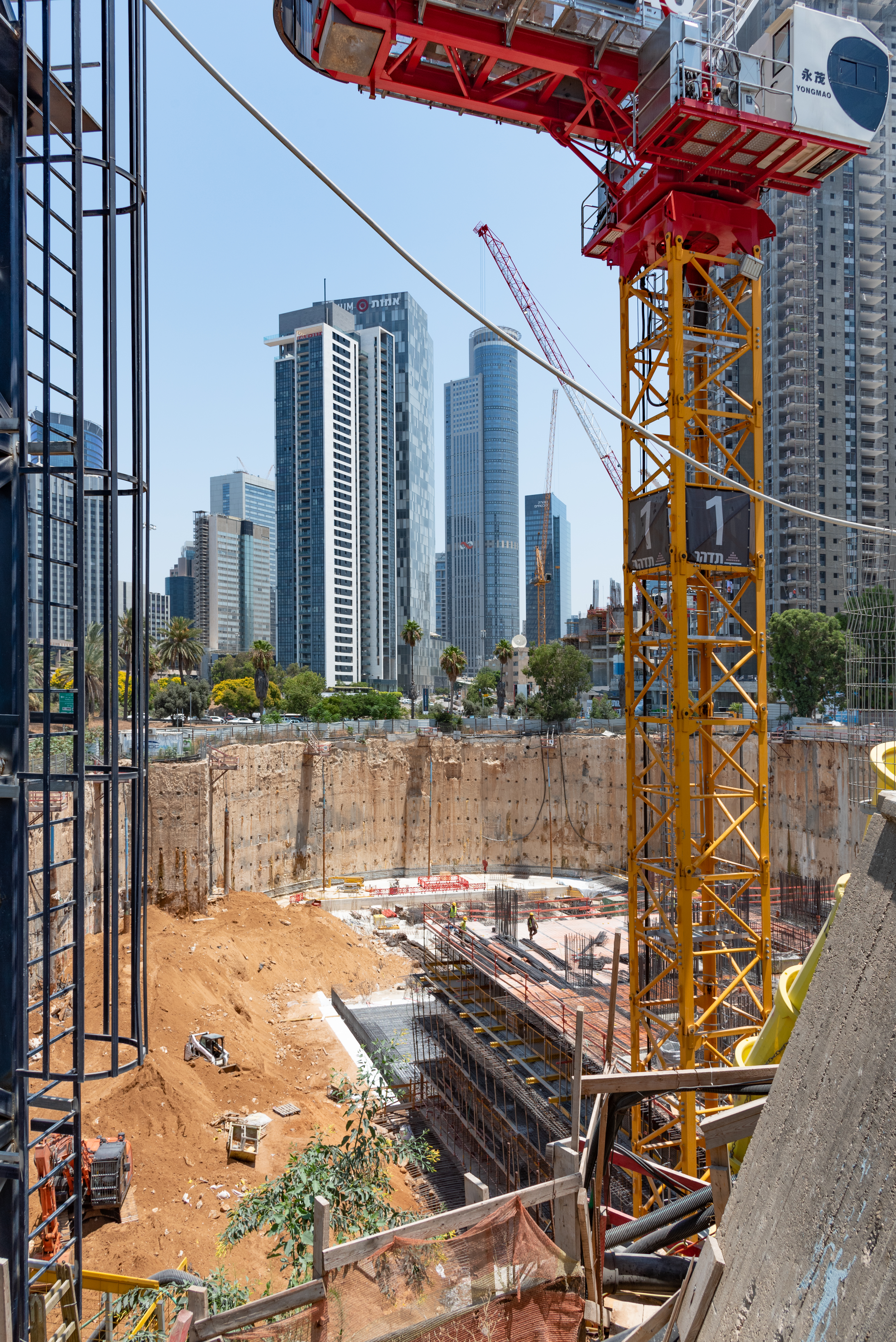
Construction site in July 2021

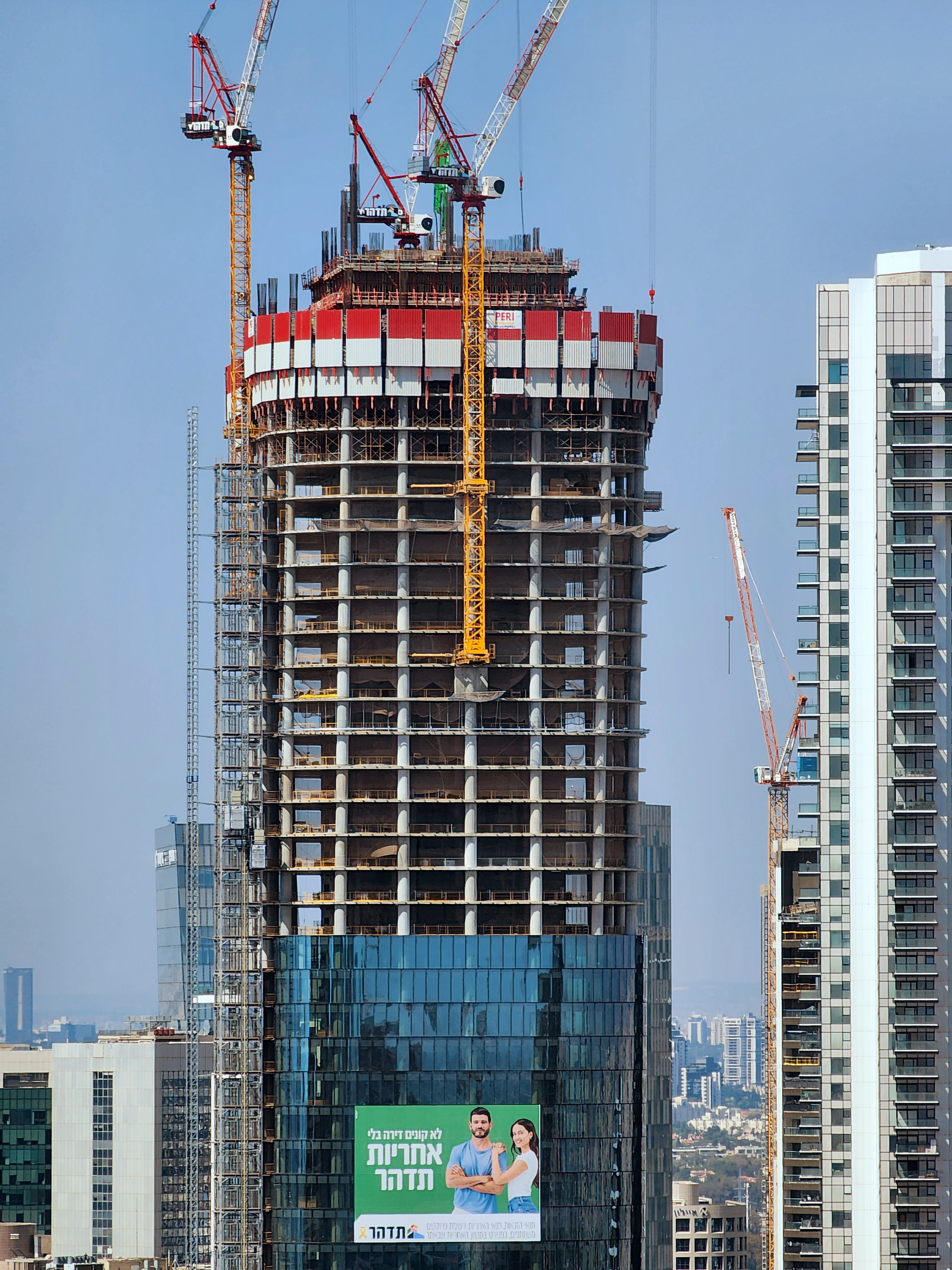
The Office Tower under construction in June 2024

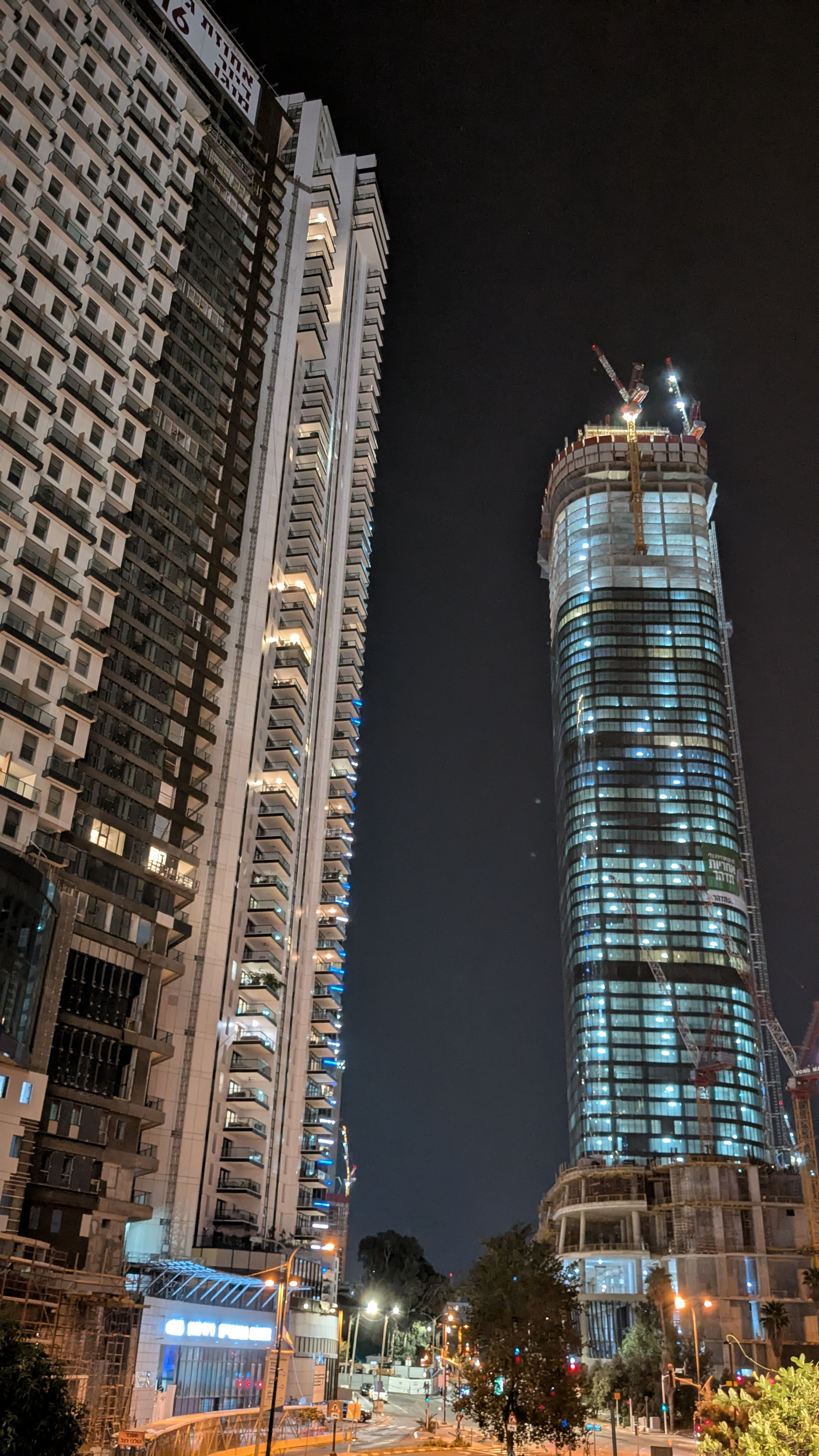
In June 2025

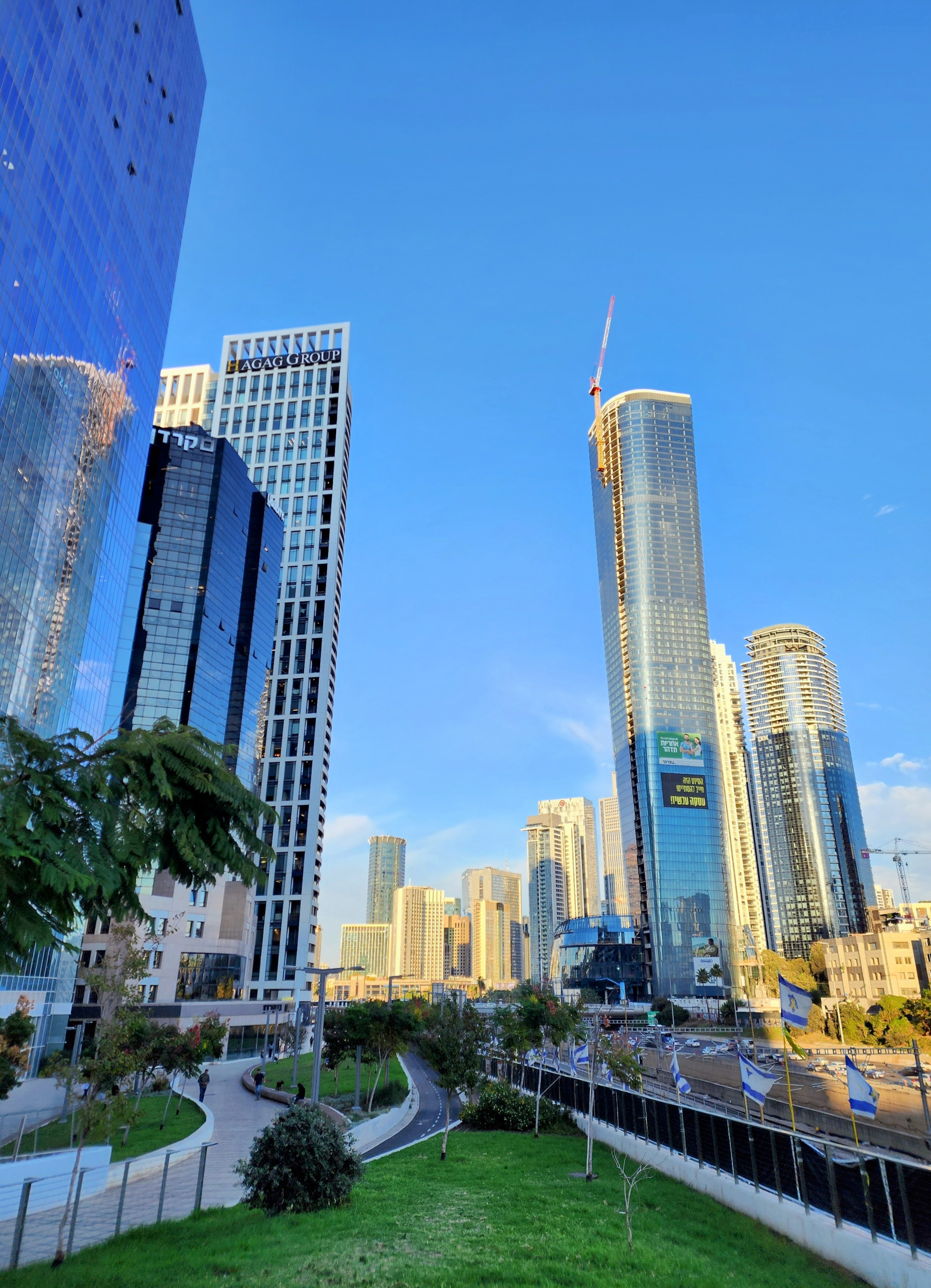
Construction in December 2025

== See also ==
- List of tallest buildings in Tel Aviv
- List of tallest buildings in Israel

Records
Preceded by Azrieli Sarona Tower	Tallest building in Israel; 2024–present 308.3 metres (1,011 ft)	Incumbent
