= Arlozorov Young Towers =

Skyscraper complex in Tel-Aviv, Israel

- מגדלי הצעירים (Hebrew)
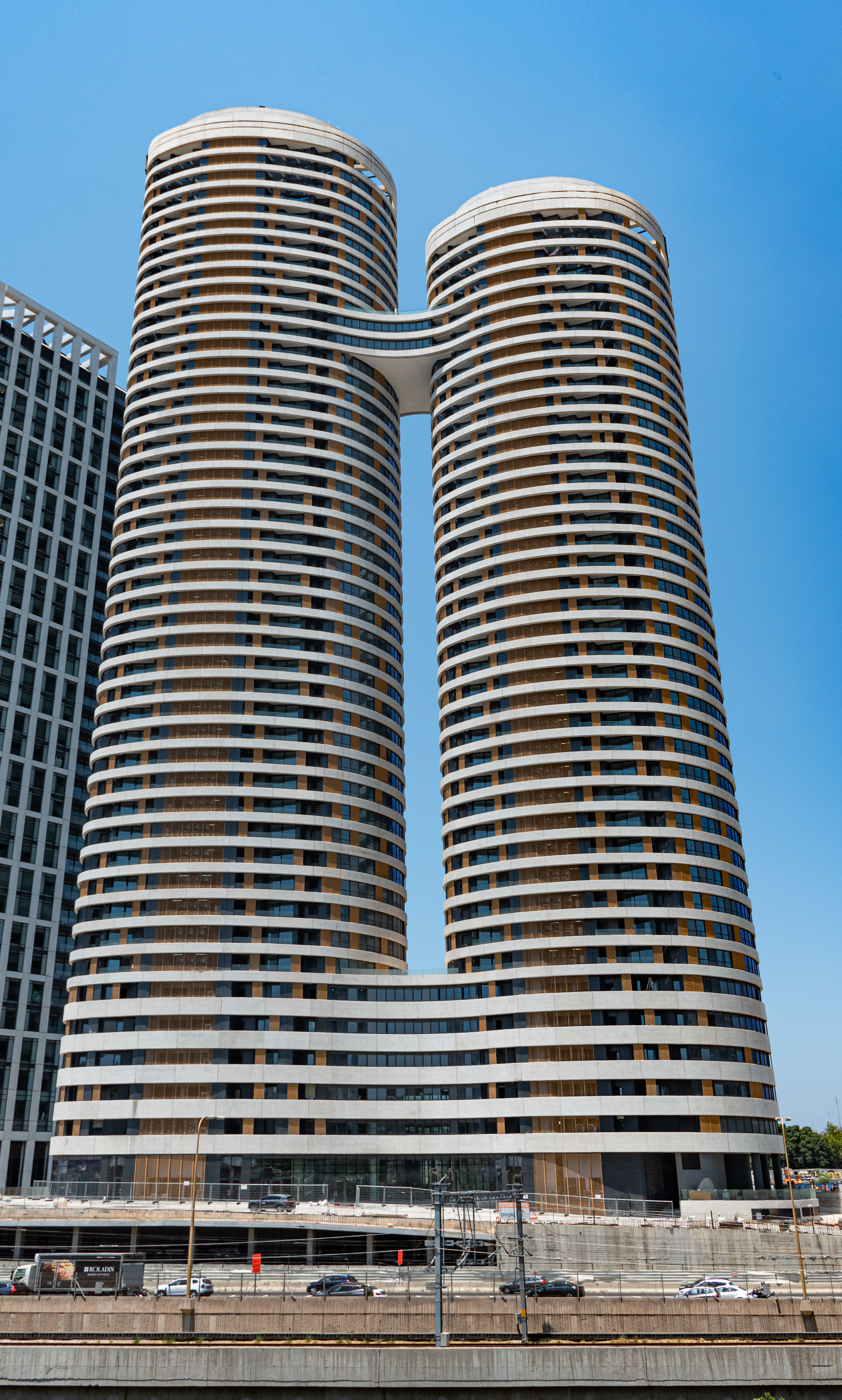
- Interactive map of the Arlozorov Young Towers area

General information
- Status: Completed
- Type: Mixed-use: Office, Residential
- Architectural style: Postmodern
- Location: Tel Aviv, Israel, 158 Derech Menachem Begin, Tel Aviv-Yafo, Israel
- Coordinates: 32.08031°N 34.79646°E
- Construction started: 2015
- Completed: 2020

Height
- Roof: 170 m (560 ft) (Tower 1); 151.7 m (498 ft) (Tower 2)

Technical details
- Structural system: Concrete
- Floor count: 53 (Tower 1); 47 (Tower 2) (+7 Underground each)

Design and construction
- Architect: Moore Yaski Sivan Architects
- Developer: Hagag Group
- Structural engineer: David Engineers
- Main contractor: Danya Cebus; U. Dori Construction

The Arlozorov Young Towers is a mixed-use skyscraper complex in the Nahalat Yitzhak district of Tel Aviv, Israel. Built between 2015 and 2020, the complex consists of two cojoined towers, standing at 170 m (560 ft) tall with 53 floors (Tower 1) respectively 151.7 m (498 ft) tall with 47 floors (Tower 2). The taller half of the composition is the current 13th tallest building in Tel Aviv.

== History ==
Their construction of the complex began in 2012 and ended in 2020. The height of the western tower is 170 meters, and the eastern tower is 150 meters high. The tallest tower has 46 floors, while the lower one rises to a height of 40 floors.

=== Architecture ===
The towers are located in the northern part of the northern main business center plan of Tel Aviv between Ayalon and Derech Begin, near the Arlozorov station of the red line of the light rail in Tel Aviv. They were designed by the office of architects Yeski Mor Sion. They have an elliptical cross-section, and a common structure in the first five floors has a wavy cross-section. A prominent feature of the building's design are horizontal white beams that wrap around the building on each floor, and correspond architecturally with the Tel Aviv Bauhaus style, and with other projects planned by the office throughout the city. The two towers are connected by a bridge located on floors 35-37.

The total area of the building is 91,000 square meters and it includes 486 housing units with two to five rooms, offices, commercial areas, kindergartens and a swimming pool. 48 housing units were allocated to affordable housing.

The plan for the northern main business center of Tel Aviv was first approved in 2009, and in 2010, the organization of a purchasing group managed by the Hajj and Inbal Or group officially began. In 2011, Dori Construction Company was chosen to carry out the project.

Construction, which was supposed to be completed by 2016, began in 2012, but was delayed, partly because of waiting for a building permit, moving electrical infrastructure and due to financial difficulties of the Dori construction company. At the same time, the Hajj Group purchased Inbal Or 's share. Also, a four-meter-high groundwater flood occurred at the site. In 2016, after the continued delay in the works, the members of the purchasing group decided to transfer the execution of the works to the Dania Sibus company, and the completion date was updated to the end of 2020.

In February 2021, the housing and construction company of the municipality of Tel Aviv-Jaffa, Ezera and in need, announced that it opened a lottery for about 50 housing units intended for rent for a price of NIS 5,887 per month in the project. According to the criteria determined by the municipality, the apartments will be used for households of couples without children or for individuals, the winners of the lottery will receive rental circulars for a period of approximately 5 years.

== Gallery ==
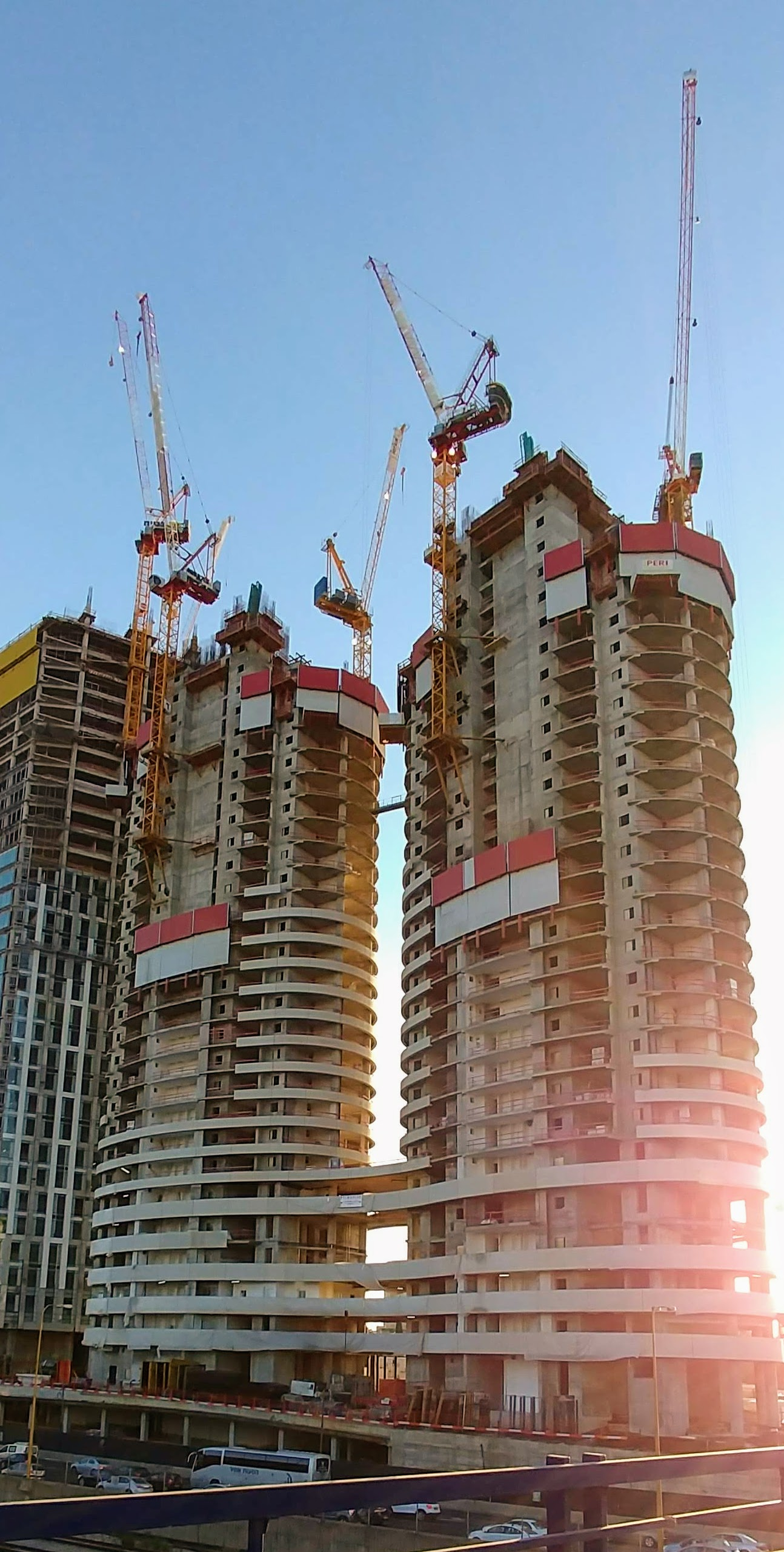
The tower under construction in 2018.

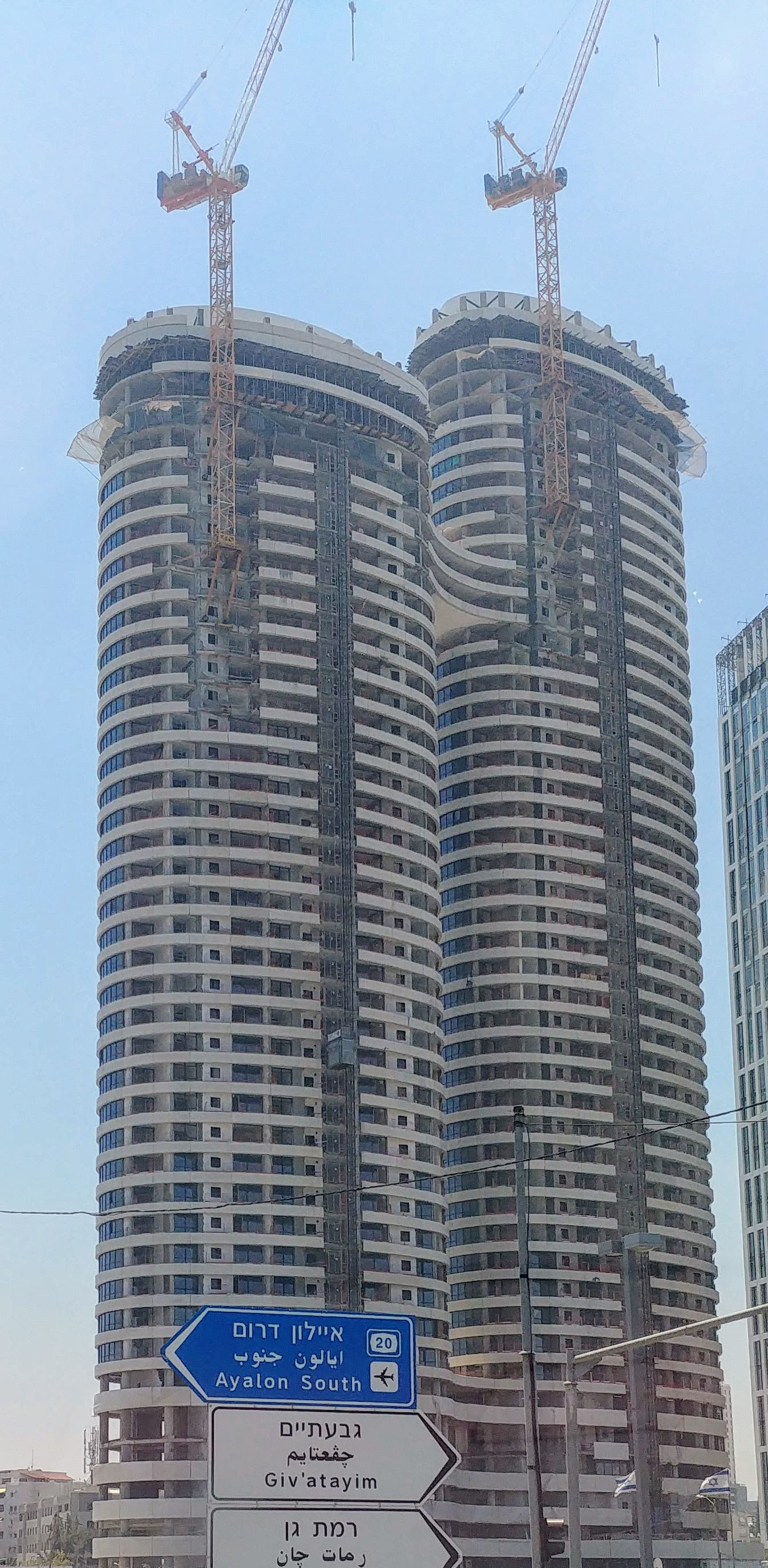
The complex under construction in 2019.

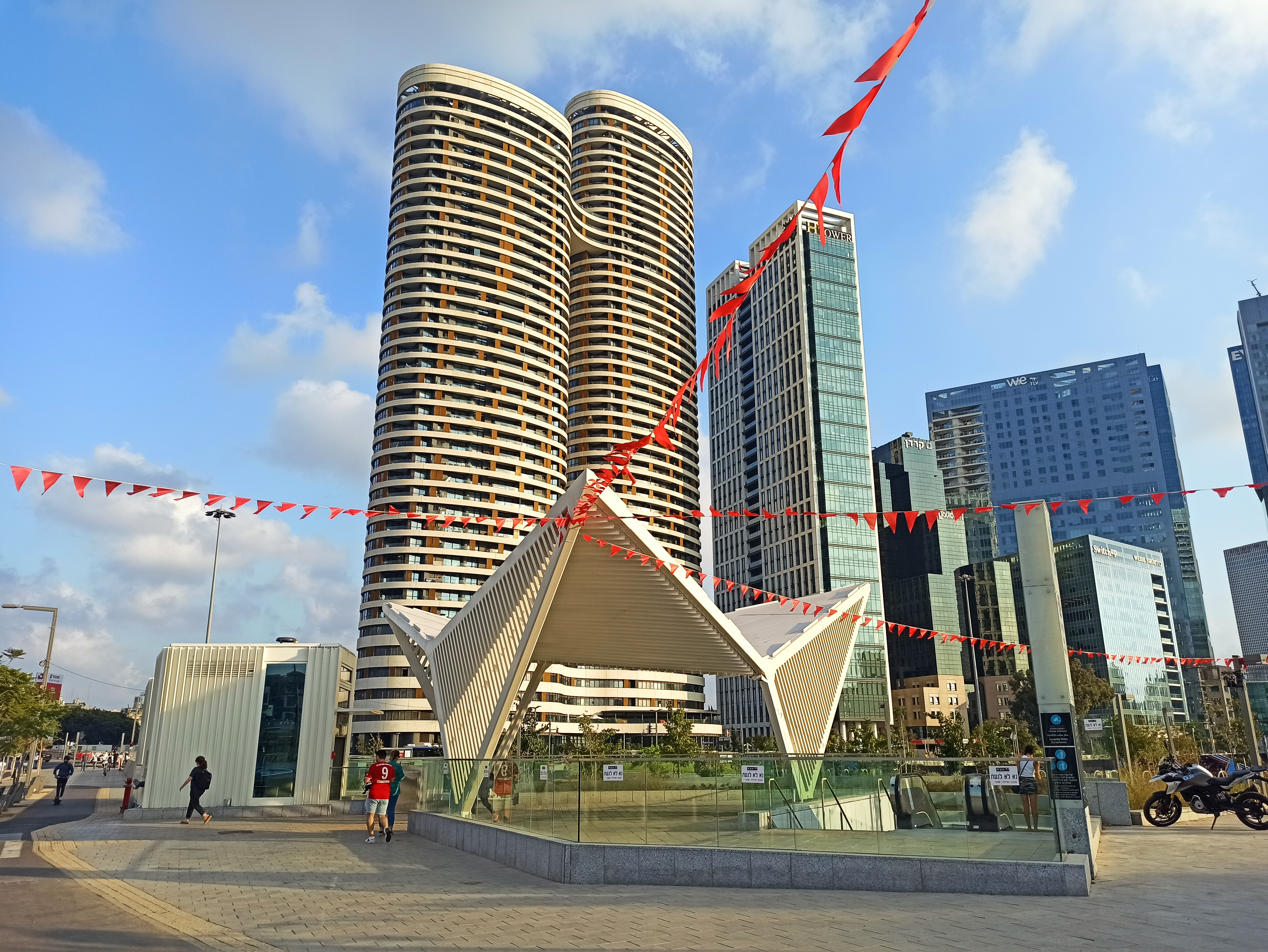
The complex in 2023.

== See also ==
- List of tallest buildings in Tel Aviv
- List of tallest buildings in Israel
