= The Park Tower =

Skyscraper in Bnei Brak, Israel

- מגדל אמות הלח"י (Hebrew)
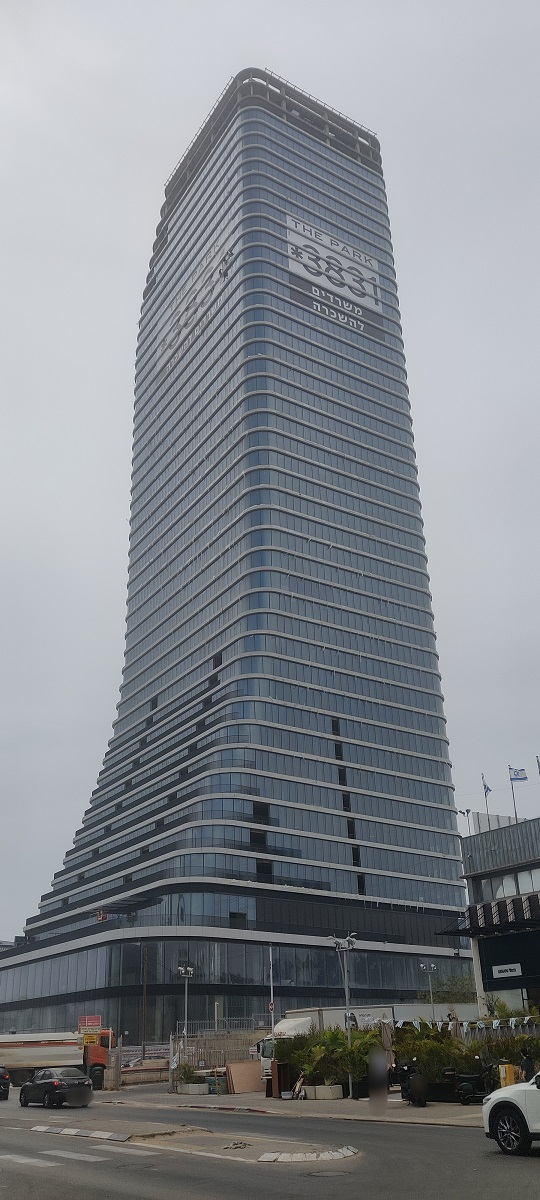

General information
- Status: Completed
- Type: Office
- Location: Bnei Brak, Tel Aviv District, Israel, 1 HaLehi St, Bnei Brak, Israel
- Coordinates: 32.10437°N 34.82954°E
- Construction started: 2021
- Completed: 2025
- Owner: Amot Investments; Allied Group

Height
- Roof: 186.7 m (613 ft)

Technical details
- Structural system: Reinforced concrete
- Floor count: 47
- Floor area: 100,000 m^{2} (1,080,000 sq ft)

The The Park Tower, also known as HYP Tower (HaYarkon Park) and Amot HaLehi Tower (Hebrew: מגדל אמות הלח"י), is an office skyscraper in Tel Aviv District city of Bnei Brak, Israel. Built between 2021 and 2025, the tower stands at 186.7 m (613 ft) tall with 47 floors and is the current 13th tallest building in Israel.

== History ==
The building is located in the northern business complex of Bnei Brak, near the Yarkon Park, the Ayalon Mall and the Bnei Brak–Ramat HaHayal railway station, and is owned by the Israeli firms of Amot Investments and the Allied Group.

The tower was initially planned to be built as a 52-story, but was replanned and downsized to 47. It benefits of advanced LEED Platinum standards, which symbolize green, efficient, and energy-efficient construction.

The tower was built on a site where the central service center of Champion Motors operated until the beginning of the second decade of the 21st century. Next to this lot, on the other side of the adjacent road, which leads to Lehi Street from the nearby Operation Kadesh bridge, is the company's headquarters until 2024.

The building rises to a height of 186.75 meters and has 47 floors: a lobby floor, 2 commercial floors, 42 office floors, and 2 technical floors at the top of the building. The total surface area of each floor in the building is approximately 2,000 m^{2} (21,500 sq ft) and the area of the entire building is approximately 100,000 m^{2} (1,080,000 sq ft). The complex also has a total of 1,000 parking spaces. The building is the 11th tallest building in Israel and the 3rd tallest in Bnei Brak and the 13th tallest in Israel.

== See also ==
- List of tallest buildings in Israel
