= Neve Nof Tower =

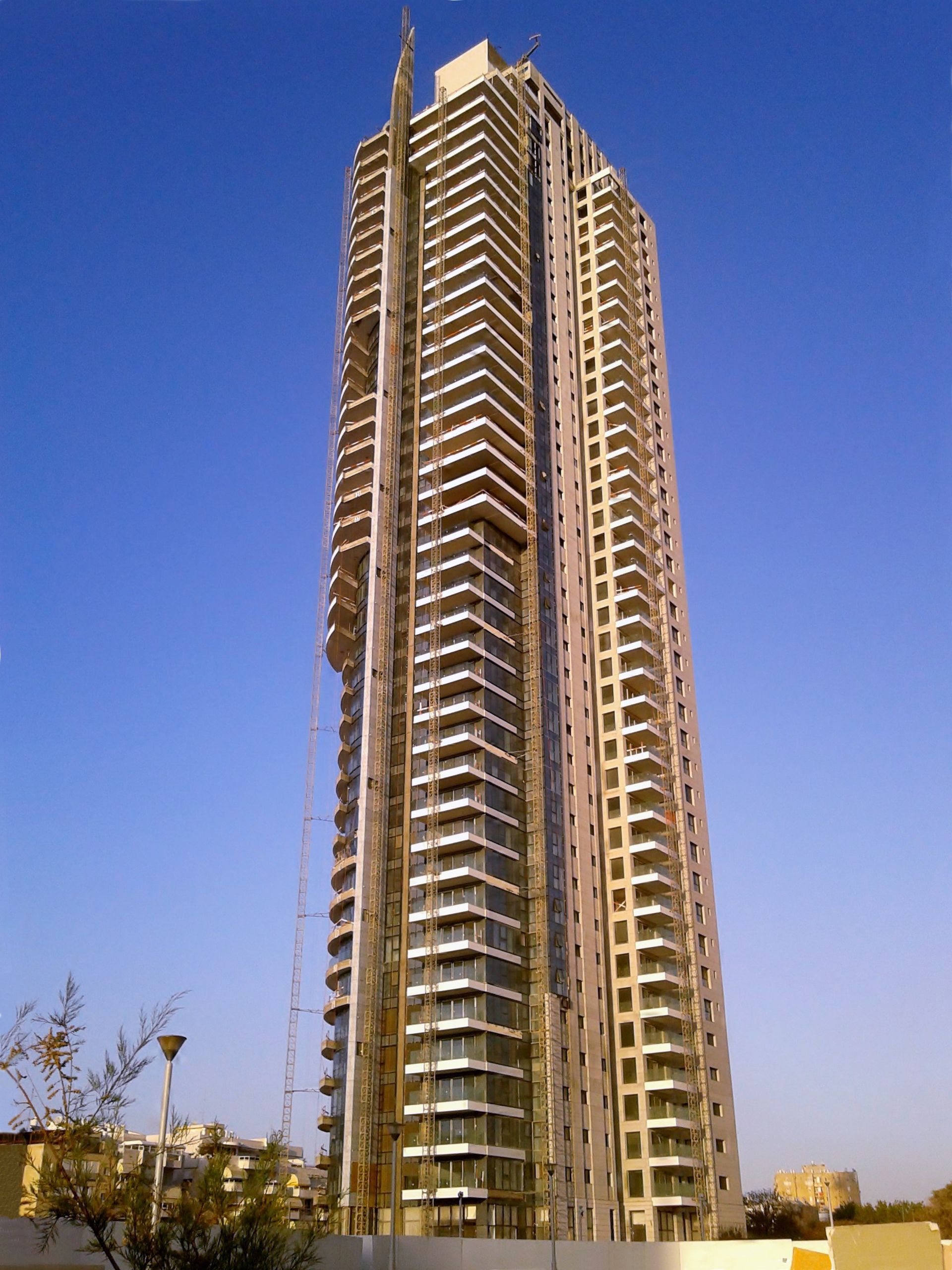
- Interactive map of the Neve Nof Tower area

General information
- Type: Residence
- Location: Bat Yam, Tel Aviv District, Israel
- Coordinates: 32.01083°N 34.7402°E
- Completed: 2013

Height
- Roof: 158.5 m (520 ft)

Technical details
- Floor count: 42

Design and construction
- Architect: Gal Marom Architects

Neve Nof Tower (Hebrew: מגדל נווה נוף) is a residential tower located in the Tel Aviv District city of Bat Yam, Israel. Its construction was completed in 2013 and it became the tallest residential building in Israel, taking the title from Park Tzameret’s ‘’W Tower’’. The tower topped out at 158.5 meters (520 ft) and includes 42 floors.

The tower's planning started in 2006 by the Gal Marom architects office, within a plan to develop the area of south Bat Yam. First, the tower's floor count was supposed to be 25, but in 2010, before the construction work started the plan was changed. The project's area is 5,000 square meters and includes 162 apartments, most of them facing the Mediterranean Sea, which is 350 meters from the tower. The Neve Nof tower includes a lobby with a beverages bar and a gym. Hotels, parks and the local boardwalk are located near the tower.

A significant portion of the apartments was purchased by nonresidents from France and the United States.

== See also ==
- List of tallest buildings in Israel
