= Kikar Hamedina =

Plaza in Tel Aviv

Coordinates: 32°05′12″N 34°47′23″E

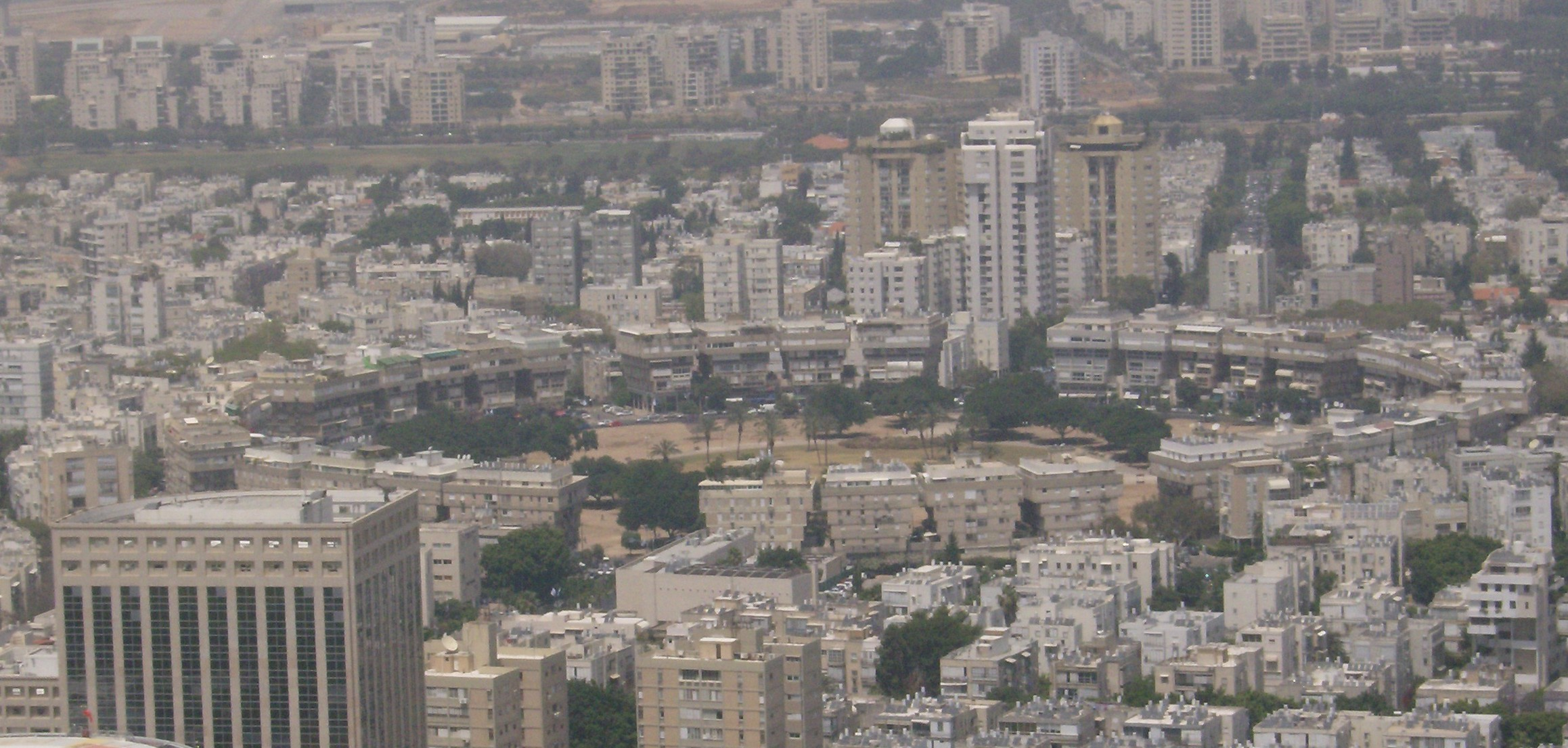
Kikar Hamedina

Kikar HaMedina (Hebrew: כיכר המדינה, lit. 'Square of The State') is the largest plaza in Tel Aviv.

Around the plaza, which was designed by architect Oscar Niemeyer (in cooperation with Israeli architects who planned for the existing residential buildings), there is a circular street, He Be'Iyar Street (Israeli Independence Day Street), connecting with two major streets: the north–south Weizmann Street, and the east–west Jabotinsky Street, as well as a number of small streets.

As the epicenter of high international fashion in Tel Aviv, Kikar Hamedina has transformed into a luxury high-end shopping district. Around the square, there exists a large array of high-end international designer stores and major representations of brands around the world. These include Gucci, Saint Laurent, Givenchy, Fendi, Dolce & Gabbana, Philip Plein, Furla, Chopard, Burberry, Valentino, Chloé, Dior, Brunello Cucinelli, Moncler, Tom Ford, Celiné, Escada, Nespresso, Audemars Piguet, Richard Mille, IWC Shcaffhausen, Frette, Hermés, Zadig & Voltaire, Eres, Bonpoint, Balenciaga and Padani.

In November 2015, a plan to revitalize the square was approved.[2] Works began in 2019 and are still in progress. The new design of the square itself includes three spiral-shaped residential towers with 453 apartments. Each tower will have 40 floors with four underground floors for parking. In addition there will be a 10-acre public park, an artificial lake, green areas and pedestrian avenues.

In the 1960s, circuses moved into the sandy square coming to perform. In the early 1970s extensive construction activity began around He BeIyar Street, which established a uniform design and luxury buildings. Many of these buildings have luxury stores and international designer shops located on the first floor, which have made it one of the most expensive areas in Tel Aviv.

On 3 September 2011, Kikar Hamedina was the gathering place for the 'March of the Million', the culminating demonstration of the 2011 Israeli social justice protests. The demonstration was the largest in Israel's history, with approximately 300,000 people marching on the square, and 100,000 demonstrating in other locations across Israel.

The square is located near the "wine press Garden", a Hellenistic archaeological site in Israel.
