= Vision Tower (Tel Aviv) =

Skyscraper in Israel

Coordinates: 32°06′56″N 34°50′35″E

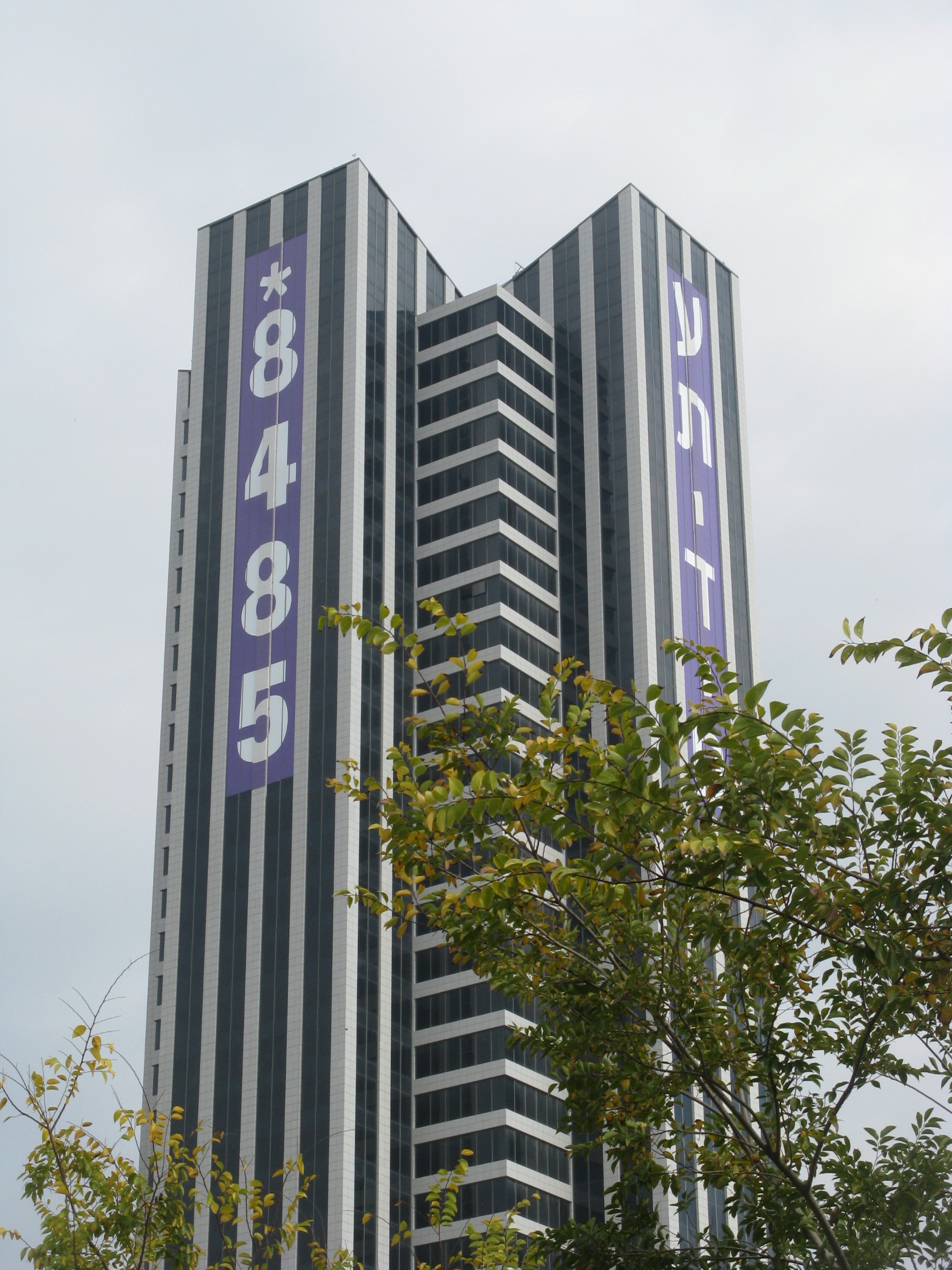

Vision Tower is a skyscraper in Tel Aviv, Israel. Completed in 2009, the building is 149.8 meters tall and has 42 floors (although, according to skyscraperpage.com, the building has 35 floors and stands at 149.8 meters).
