= HaShahar Tower =

Skyscraper in Tel Aviv, Israel

Coordinates: 32.0803°N 34.8000°E

- מגדל השחר
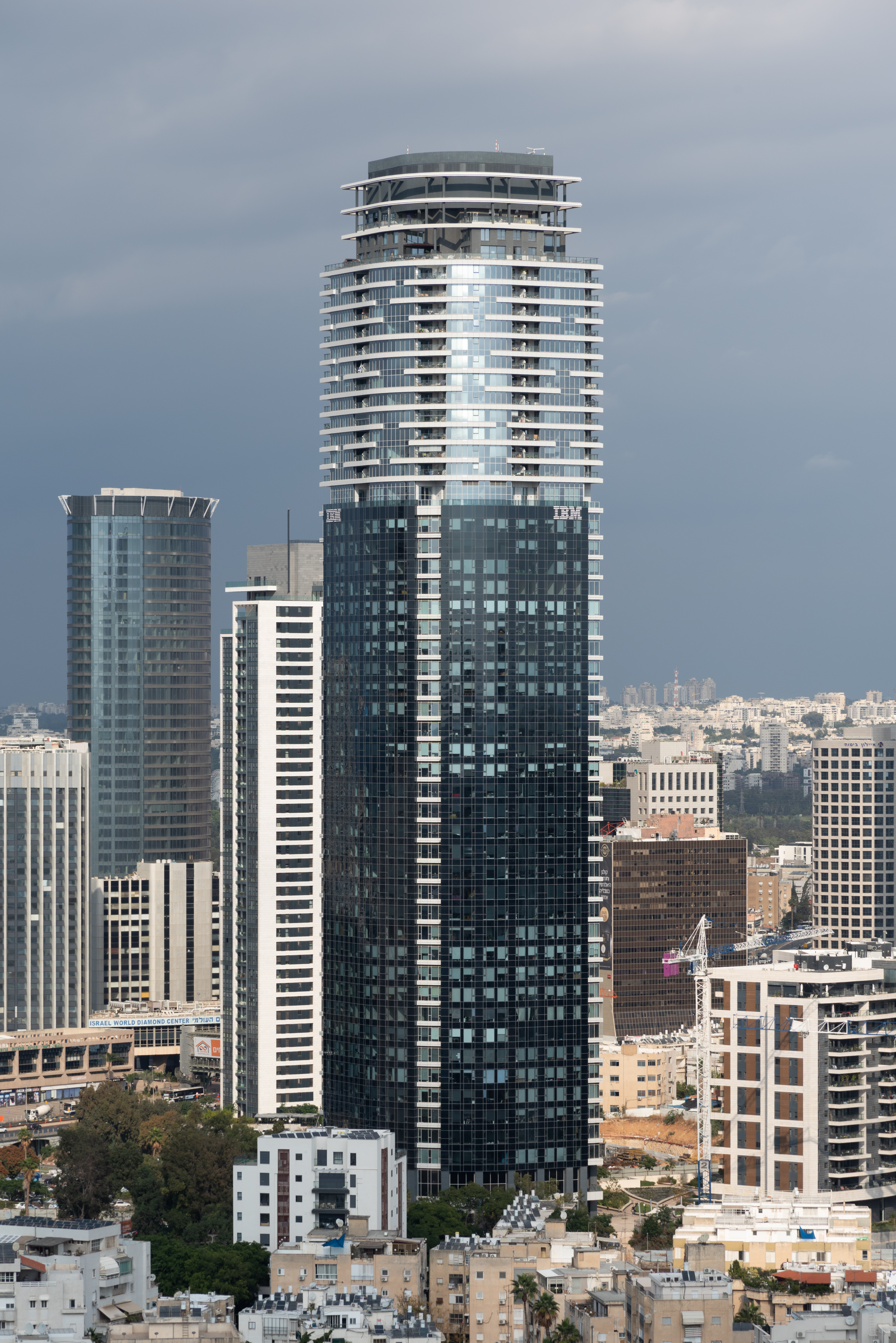
- Interactive map of the HaShahar Tower area

General information
- Status: Completed
- Type: Office • Commercial • Residential
- Location: Givatayim, Tel Aviv District, Israel
- Construction started: 2012
- Opening: 2017

Height
- Roof: 195 m (640 ft)

Technical details
- Floor count: 57

Design and construction
- Developer: Tidhar group, Sufrin group

HaShahar Tower (Hebrew: מגדל השחר, Migdal HaShahar) is a skyscraper located in the Tel Aviv District city of Givatayim, Israel.

== History ==
HaShahar Tower located at Ariel Sharon street in Givatayim and it contains 57 stories. Construction started in 2012 and ended in January 2017. The first lower 37 floors are designated for offices and commercial space. The upper 17 floors contains 149 apartments and on floor 38 a residential sky lobby was built. The tower also contains 5 underground parking levels.

The tower is a part of The City Complex in Givatayim that contains two 12 story residential building, a taller building that its height will be 240 meters and a tunnel.

In September 2012, Clal Bituach acquired 20 floors for investing. In 2015, IBM Israel leased from Clal Bituach 7 floors in the tower.
