= List of tallest buildings in Tel Aviv =

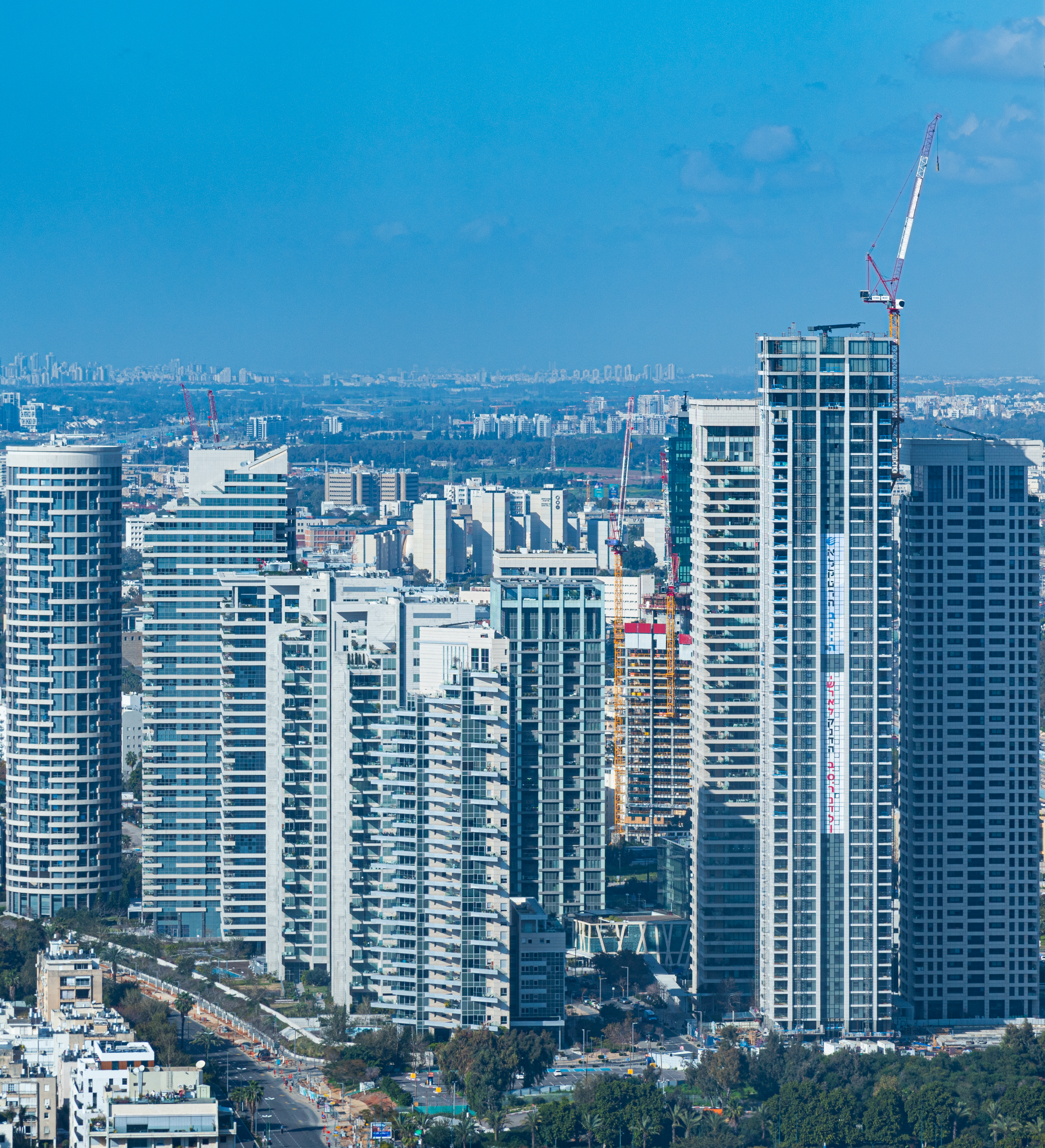
A view of Park Tzameret, a high-end residential neighborhood in Tel Aviv

This list of the tallest buildings in Tel Aviv ranks buildings in Tel Aviv, Israel by their height. Tel Aviv is the second-largest city in the State of Israel. Some of the tallest buildings in Israel are located in Tel Aviv as well as Ramat Gan. Tel Aviv is noted for its recent development as a hub in high-rise buildings due to its soaring price of real estate. Almost all the buildings above 100 meters were built within the past two decades.

From 1965 to 1999, Israel's first skyscraper, the Shalom Meir Tower, was the country's tallest building. The current tallest building in Tel Aviv is the Beyond Tower, with the Azrieli Spiral Tower expected to soon overpass it in rankings, followed by larger skyscrapers such as the Vertical Bursa.

== Tallest buildings ==
=== Above 150 m ===
This list ranks Tel Aviv skyscrapers that stand at least 150 meters (490 ft) tall, based on standard height measurement. This height includes spires and architectural details but does not include antenna masts. An equal sign (=) following a rank indicates the same height between two or more buildings; they are listed in order of floor count, then alphabetically. The "Year" column indicates the year in which a building was completed.

Rank	Name	Image	Height m (ft)	Floors	Year	Notes
2	ToHA Tower 2		303 m (994 ft)	76	2026	
3	Azrieli Sarona Tower		238 m (781 ft)	61	2017	Tallest building in Israel 2017–2026.
4	Midtown Office		196 m (643 ft)	50	2017	
5	Azrieli Center Circular Tower		187 m (614 ft)	50	1999	
6	Midtown Residences		183 m (600 ft)	50	2018	
7	Arlozorov Young Towers 1		180 m (590 ft)	47	2020	
8	Rom Tel Aviv		173.1 m (568 ft)	50	2021	
9	Azrieli Center Triangular Tower		169 m (554 ft)	46	1999	
10=	Alon Towers 1		165 m (541 ft)	42	2017	
10=	Alon Tower 2		165 m (541 ft)	42	2017	
10=	Electra Tower		165 m (541 ft)	45	2011	
13=	HaArba'a Tower 1		160 m (520 ft)	38	2017	
13=	Sitonai Market Tower 1		160 m (520 ft)	48	2020	
13=	Sitonai Market Tower 2		160 m (520 ft)	48	2020	
16	Kirya Tower		158 m (518 ft)	42	2005	
17	W-Tower		156.4 m (513 ft)	46	2010	
18	Meier on Rothschild		155.4 m (510 ft)	40	2015	
19=	Da Vinci North Tower		155.2 m (509 ft)	42	2023	
19=	Da Vinci South Tower		155.2 m (509 ft)	42	2023	
21	Azrieli Town Office Tower		155 m (509 ft)	40	2021	
22	Azrieli Center Square Tower		154 m (505 ft)	42	2007	
23	H Recital Tower		153 m (502 ft)	34	2019	
24=	Arlozorov Young Towers 2		150 m (490 ft)	41	2020	
24=	Park Bavli Tower 1		150 m (490 ft)	44	2018	
24=	W-Prime Tower		150 m (490 ft)	44	2016	

=== 120–150 m ===
Name	Image	Height m (ft)	Floors	Year	Source
Vision Tower		149.8 m (491 ft)	36	2012	
HaArba'a Tower 2		146 m (479 ft)	34	2017	
Delek Motors Tower		146 m (479 ft)	36	2020	
Neve Tzedek Tower		147 m (482 ft)	44	2007	
Yoo Tel Aviv 2		142 m (466 ft)	41	2007	
Manhattan Tower		140 m (460 ft)	41	2009	
TOU Tower 1		140 m (460 ft)	36	2021	
TOU Tower 2		140 m (460 ft)	36	2021	
Tel Aviv Tower 1		140 m (460 ft)	34	2000	
Tel Aviv Tower 2		140 m (460 ft)	34	2000	
Tel Aviv Tower 3		140 m (460 ft)	34	2013	
White City Residence		139 m (456 ft)	33	2015	
Marganit Tower		138 m (453 ft)	17	1987	
First International Bank Tower		132 m (433 ft)	32	2009	
Yoo Tel Aviv 1		128 m (420 ft)	39	2007	
Aviv Rothschild Tower		126.9 m (416 ft)	29	2014	
1 Rothschild Boulevard		125 m (410 ft)	32	2010	
ToHa Tower 1		125 m (410 ft)	30	2019	
Levinstein Tower		124 m (407 ft)	33	2000	
Tzameret Tower 1		123 m (404 ft)	34	2002	
Tzameret Tower 2		123 m (404 ft)	34	2002	
Tzameret Tower 3		123 m (404 ft)	34	2001	
Shalom Meir Tower		120 m (390 ft)	36	1965	

== Tallest under construction or proposed ==
This lists buildings that are under construction in Tel Aviv and are planned to rise at least 120 metres (394 ft). Any buildings that have been topped out but are not completed are also included.

Under Construction

Name	Height m / ft	Floors	Year	Notes
Azrieli Spiral Tower	323 / 1060	91	2028	Construction started in 2019
Landmark Tower 2	205 / 673	55	2026	
Duo Tel Aviv Tower 1	194 / 636	54	2026	
Duo Tel Aviv Tower 2	194 / 636	54	2026	
Maariv Tower	180 / 591	45	2022	Construction started in 2018
Azrieli Town 2	175 / 574	50	2021	
H Infinity Tower 1	170 / 560	53	2023	Construction started in 2017
Landmark Tower 1	165 / 541	55	2023	
Sarona Hotel	162 / 534	47	2023	Construction started in 2017
Da Vinci Tower 1	160 / 520	44	2021	
Da Vinci Tower 2	160 / 520	44	2021	
Sitonai Market Tower 3	160 / 520	48	2022	
Sitonai Market Tower 4	160 / 520	48	2023	
Bavli Beresheet Tower	158 / 518	45	2022	
Kikar HaMedina Tower 1	156 / 512	42	2023	
Kikar HaMedina Tower 2	156 / 512	42	2023	
Kikar HaMedina Tower 3	156 / 512	42	2023	
East End	153 / 502	36	2023	
Park Bavli 2	150 / 492	44	2021	

Proposed

Name	Height m / ft	Floors	Year	Notes
Bein Arim Tower	400 / 1310	100	—	
Keren HaKirya Office Tower 1	340 / 1115	80	—	
Dofen Hakirya	279 / 915	57	—	
Keren HaKirya Residential Tower A	250 / 820	51	—	

== Timeline of tallest buildings ==
This is a list of buildings that once held the title of tallest building in Tel Aviv.

Name	Years as tallest	Height m / ft	Floors	Notes
Shalom Meir Tower	1965–1999	142 / 466	36	
Azrieli Center Circular Tower	1999–2017	187 / 614	49	
Azrieli Sarona Tower	2017–2025	238 / 781	53	

== See also ==
- List of tallest buildings in Israel
- List of tallest buildings in Ramat Gan
