= Israel Canada =

Israeli real estate company

Israel Canada (T.R) Ltd.
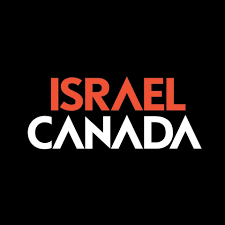
- Company type: Public company
- Traded as: TASE: ISCN
- ISIN: IL0004340191
- Industry: Real estate
- Founded: 1995; 31 years ago
- Headquarters: Herzliya, Israel
- Key people: Asaf Touchmair, Chairman; Barak Rosen, CEO
- Number of employees: 800
- Subsidiaries: Israel Canada Hotels (ICH); Israel Canada Residence (ICR)
- Website: israel-canada.co.il/en

Israel Canada (T.R) LTD. (Hebrew: יִשְׂרָאֵל קָנָדָה) is an Israeli real estate company, traded in Tel-Aviv Stock Exchange (TASE: ISCN) at a NIS 6.5 Billion market cap (as of December 2024), founded by Barak Rosen (CEO) and Asaf Touchmair (chairman). Israel Canada develops luxury residential properties, retail, offices and hotel projects with iconic buildings, in prime locations, mainly in central Israel.

Since 2022 Israel Canada is ranked at the top 5 on Duns100 Real Estate Development Listed Companies.

== History ==
=== Background ===
In 2006 Rosen and Touchmair bought a public shell in Tel-Aviv Stock Exchange - Pangaya Real Estate. A year later, the company raised Brevan Howard Hedge fund to buy 4.9% of Pangaya for NIS 7.3 Million. Pangaya later changed its name to Israel-Canada (T.R).

=== Israel Canada ===
in 2006 the company started building Israel's tallest residential building at the time - W Tower (511 ft.), completed in 2010 at Tzamarot Ayalon. In the coming years Israel Canada completed the development of 3 more Skyscrapers in the neighborhood: W Boutique Tower, W Prime and Rom Tower.

In October 2015, Israel Canada acquired from Paz Oil Company its holding in Pi Glilot, which owned 164 dunams in the complex near the Glilot Interchange. In addition, it purchased 34 dunams from Paz that were used as the company's logistics distribution center, for a total of NIS 237 million.

In November 2017 Israel Canada raised NIS 100 Million from Israeli institutional investors, at a company value of NIS 755 Million, after an increase of 400% in the company's market cap in 3 years.

In February 2018 Israel-Canada began trading in TA-125 Index. At the same year, Israel Canada finished its Midtown residential project in Tel-Aviv on Begin road. Midtown project is a two - 50 floor towers, resident and office, with a commercial complex on street level constructed at a cost of NIS 2.6 billion. Israel Canada later promoted similar project in Jerusalem - Midtown Jerusalem. At the beginning of 2023 it was approved, with a 1,000 apartments, offices and a hotel in Shaare Zedek, and will combine in the new entrance planned for Jerusalem.

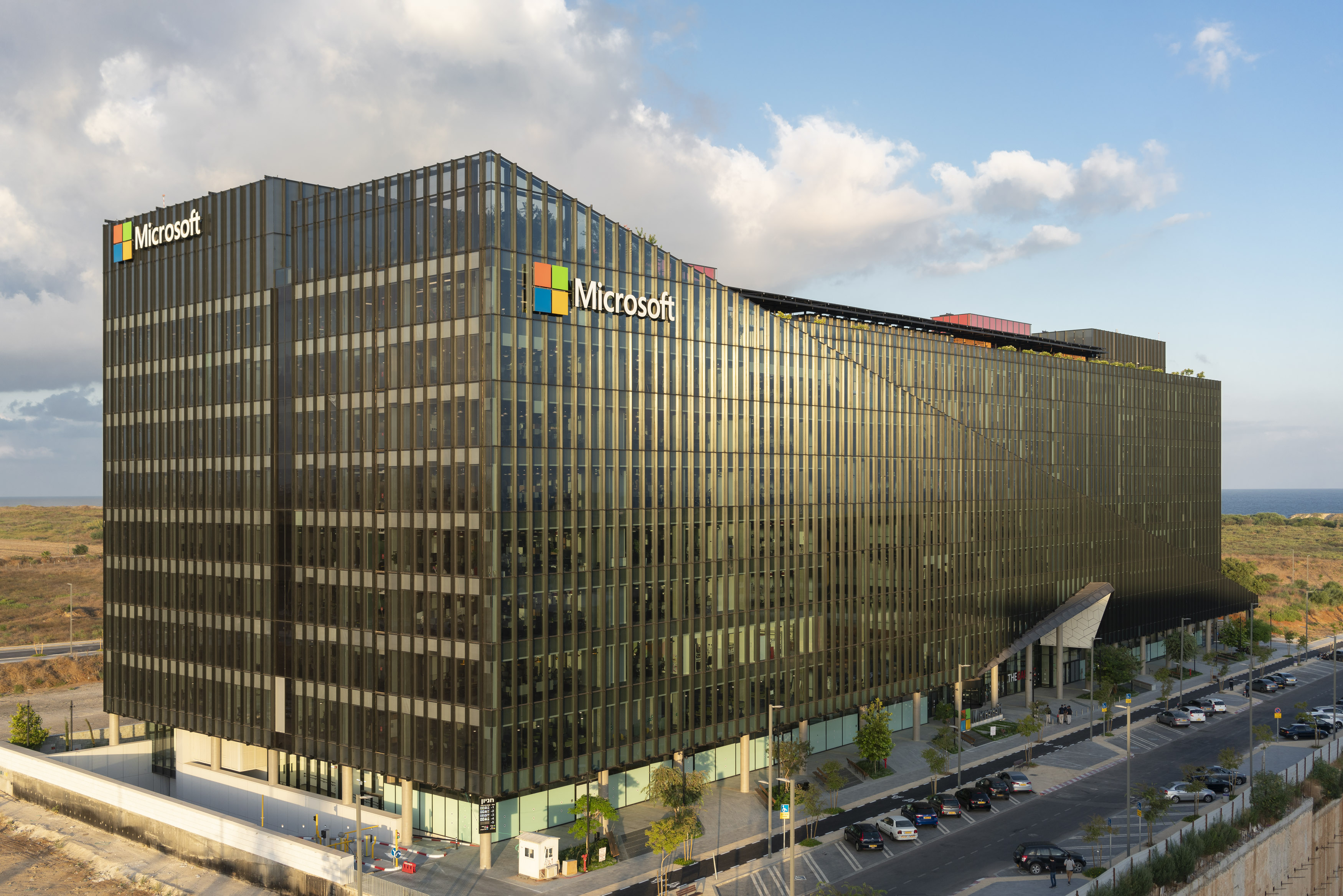
Microsoft Israel R&D Center in Herzliya

In 2019, Israel Canada completed Wix projected with 50,000 Square metre over 40 dunams, as the new tech company head campus. A year later, Israel Canada opened its project - Microsoft House Sea Tower, as Microsoft Israel new R&D center in Herzliya. The project was built over 10 dunams, with a total investment of NIS 1 billion.

In 2020 Israel Canada, in cooperation with the Nakash Brothers Group, acquired Minrav Projects which was one of Israel's top real estate and construction companies. The deal was reportedly worth NIS 574 million.

In April 2021, Israel Canada won a tender for 33 dunams in west of Hod Hasharon at Beit Hana'ara location, offering a NIS 511 million. It is planned to build 450 prestige homes on the site.

In June 2021 Israel Canada won the largest land reserve in the central district of Israel, about 1,000 apartments, amounting to more than NIS 2 billion in north Tel Aviv.

In 2021 Israel Canada Tech Investments (ICT) was established and the company started investing in corporations and startups with an affinity to real estate, including property technology, construction technology and renewable energy in all investment stages.

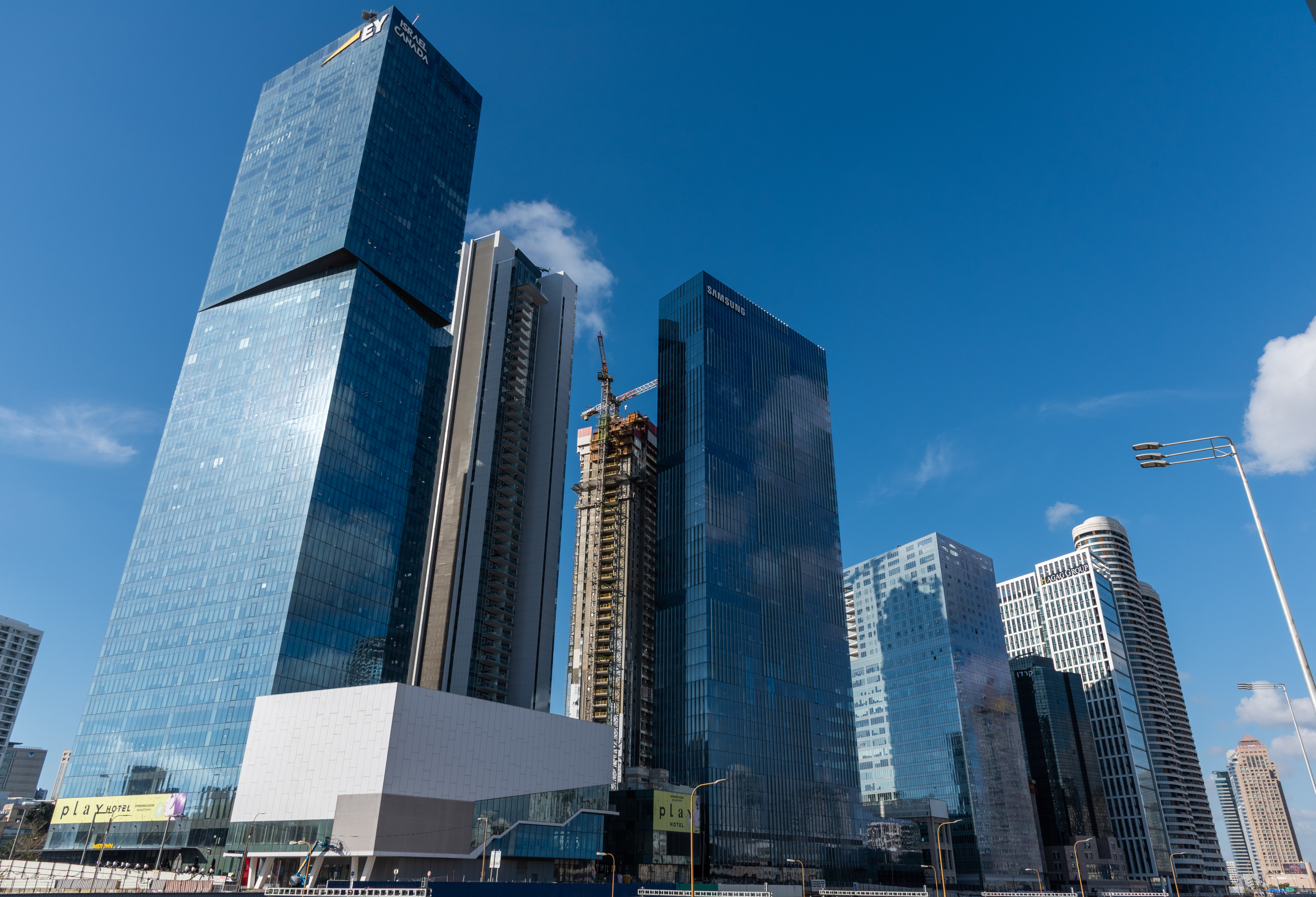
Midtown TLV towers

In January 2022 Rosen and Touchmair led Israel Canada to acquired 22.6 percent of Norstar, the main controlling shareholder of Gazit-Globe, an Israeli-based international commercial real estate company with an accumulation of assets worth NIS 40 billion. In April 2022 Israel Canada launched a takeover bid for Norstar.

In December 2022, Israel Canada went into the nursing home sector, buying 'Neve Aviv Retirement Home' - a nursing home in Kfar Shmaryahu, for NIS 125 million.

In May 2024, Israel Canada Bought a 2.4 dunams parking lot in central Tel-Aviv, fof NIS 443 million. With plans for a 45 floor tower, the site is located between Dubnov Street and Leonardo Da Vinci Street, not far from the company's Da Vinci TLV project.

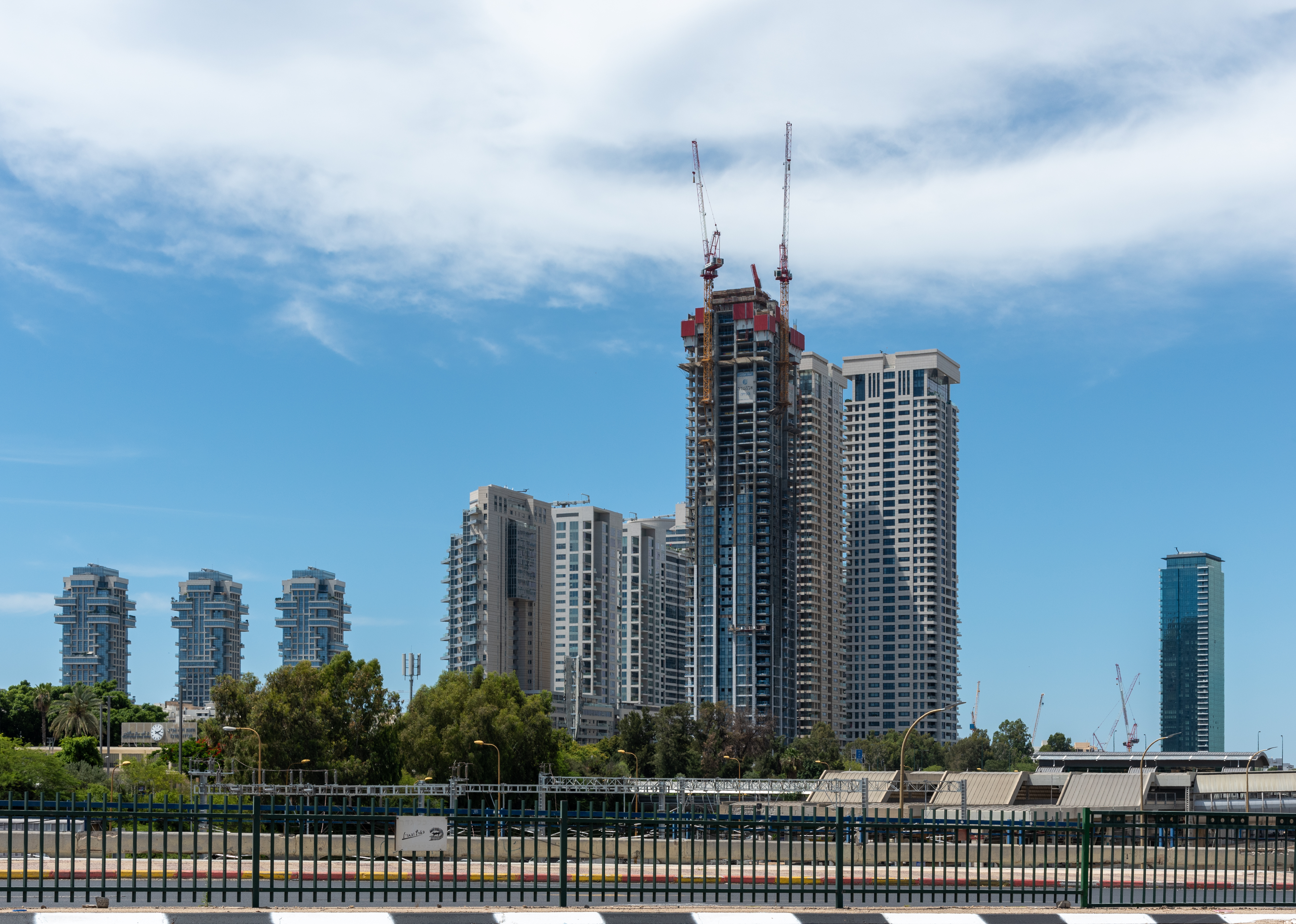
Rom Tower on the left (in construction) and W Prime Tower on the right

Israel Canada is the main real estate developer in Tzamarot Ayalon, which is ranked as one of Israel's wealthiest neighborhoods.

Many Israel's leading celebrities bought apartments in Israel Canada real estate projects, including: Bar Refaeli, Lior Suchard, Eden Ben Zaken, Idan Raichel, Yossi Benayoun, Eran Zahavi, Aviv Geffen, Noa Kirel and Omer Adam.

=== Sponsorships ===
Since 2021/2022 season, Israel Canada is the official sponsor of Maccabi Tel Aviv F.C.

== Subsidiaries ==
=== Israel Canada Hotels (ICH) ===
ICH is a hotel chain with hotels in Israel and abroad with Assets under management of thousands of accommodation units. ICH was established in 2019 and owns or manage (partial hotel list): Galei Kinneret (Tiberias), Lake House (Tiberias), Nofey Gonen Holiday Village (Kibbutz Gonen), Play Midtown (Tel Aviv), West (Tel Aviv), West (Ashdod), Daniel (Dead Sea), Soleil (Eilat) and Play Hayarkon (Tel Aviv).

At the end of 2020, ICH announced it will buy 3 hotels from Tamaras chain, owned by Poju Zabludowicz, in 1 NIS 155 million deal.

in April 2021, Israel Canada announced that it will build in Tel Aviv the first hotel of the Four Seasons Hotels and Resorts chain. The project will conclude three 35-45-story towers, with residential, hotel and commercial.

In July 2022 Menora Mivtachim, acquired 15% of ICH for NIS 88 million, which reflected a value of NIS 560 million to the company.

In September 2022, ICH announced it will buy the boutique hotel chain - Brown Hotels, for NIS 100 million, and merge it with ICH. The deal includes 10 hotels with 779 rooms, including the Brown and Lighthouse brands, online activities and loyalty program. After the deal, ICH will have 25 hotels in Israel and Greece with 3,600 rooms systemwide.

=== Israel Canada Residence (ICR) ===
ICR was founded as of a merger between Israel Canada and Minrav Projects, which was a traded at the time in Tel Aviv Stock Exchange. shortly after, Minrav Projects was delisted and became a private company, changing its name to ICR.

In 2020, Israel Canada Rem Residence announced a NIS 650 million project, which included an urban-renewal for Kiryat Hayovel.

=== Canada Global ===
In November 2022, Israel Canada purchased Aviv Arlon - a public traded real estate company in Israel. Israel Canada changed its name to Canada Global and started investing in commercial real estate abroad.

In September 2024, Flow who was founded by Adam Neumann and Andreessen Horowitz invested NIS 89 million in Canada Global, along with Assaf Rappaport, Wiz founder.

A couple of months later, in November 2024, Canada Global announced it bought a $116 million office complex on a 10 acres in the Aventura neighborhood, Miami. It has approved plans to build two 24-floor towers with 500 apartments, and 4,000 square meters of commercial space.

=== Norstar ===
As of 2022, Israel Canada controls (the largest shareholder) of Norstar, which owns 51% of Gazit-Globe - a global real estate company, owning, developing and managing income-producing properties including retail, office and residential in central urban locations

== Shareholders (as of December 2024) ==
Distribution of stakeholders
Stakeholders	% in capital	Market value (In millions of NIS)
Ben David Ohayon Avraham	17.22%	805.2
Rosen Barak	16.24%	759.4
Touchmair Asaf	15.81%	739.5
Menora Mivtachim	7.44%	348.4
Migdal (company)	6.31%	294.8
Harel Group	5.94%	278
Clal Insurance	5.51%	257.4
