= Matcal Tower =

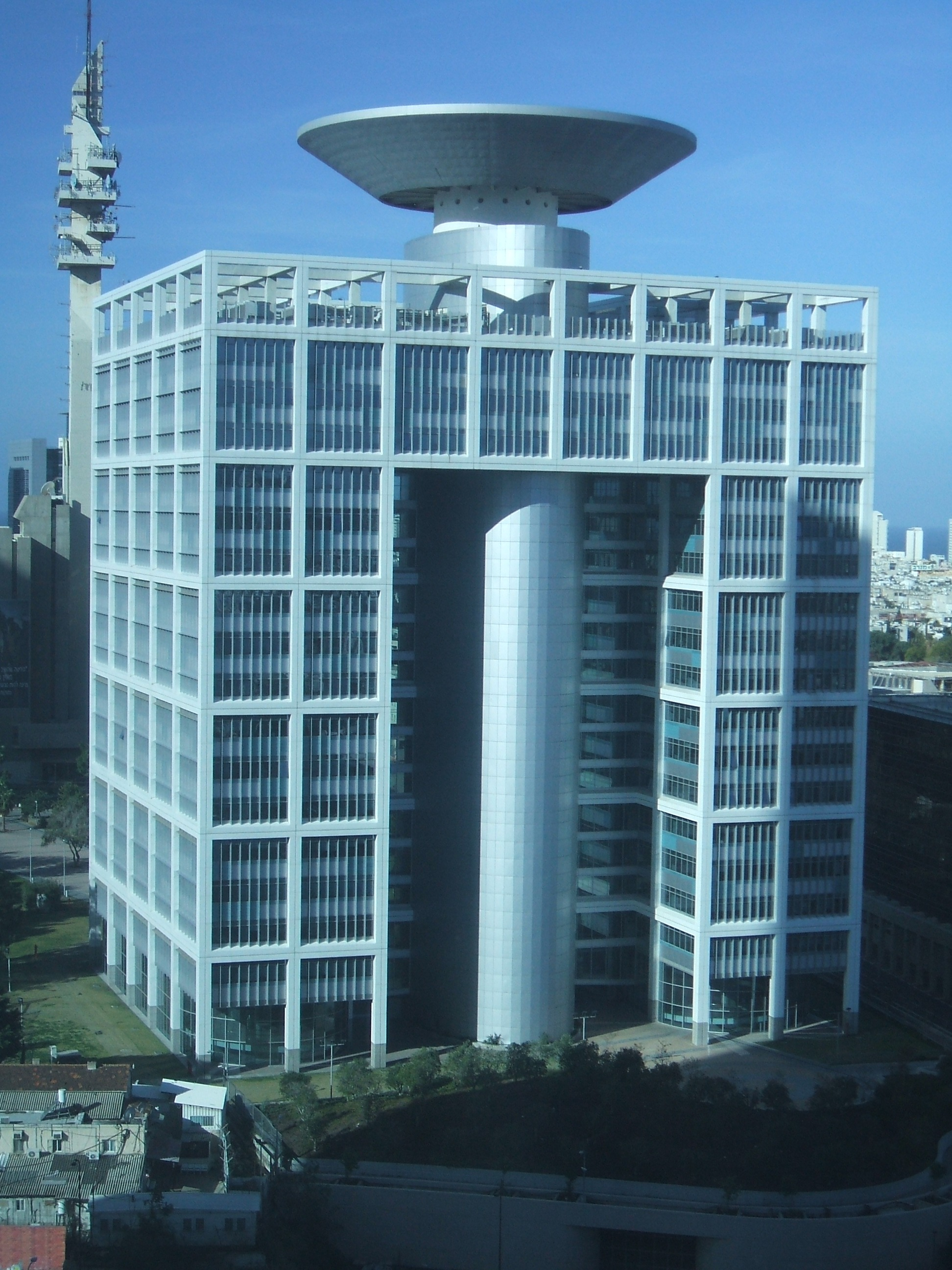
- Interactive map of the Matcal Tower area

General information
- Status: Completed
- Type: Government Offices
- Location: Tel Aviv, Israel
- Coordinates: 32°4′30.97″N 34°47′24.55″E
- Completed: 2005
- Cost: $400,000,000

Height
- Antenna spire: 107 m (351 ft)

Technical details
- Floor count: 17

Design and construction
- Architect: Moore Yaski Sivan Architects

Matcal Tower is a 17-floor high-rise building at Camp Rabin military base in HaKirya quarter of Tel Aviv, Israel.

== History ==
The tower was originally planned to include only 14 floors and no helipad. It houses the headquarters of the Israel Ministry of Defense and offices of the IDF General Staff (Matcal in Hebrew). It was built in 2003, and is located close to another IDF building, the Marganit Tower, across the road from the civilian Azrieli Center. The tower and the Azrieli Bridge connecting the base with the Azrieli Center were designed by Moore Yaski Sivan Architects.

== See also ==
- Architecture of Israel
