= Da Vinci Towers =

Skyscrpaer complex in Tel Aviv, Israel

- מִגְדָּלִי דָה וִינצִ'י (Hebrew)
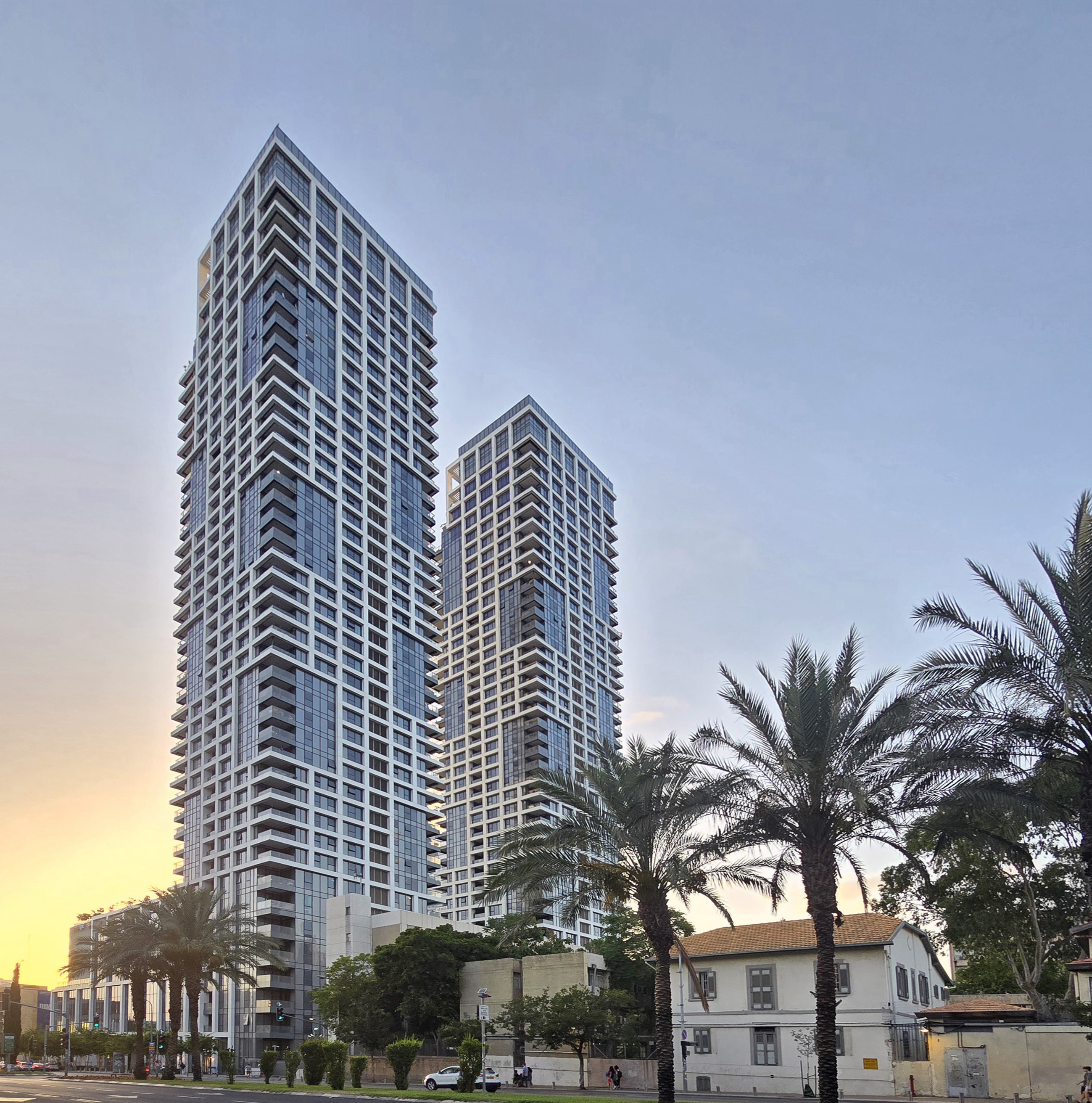
- Interactive map of the Da Vinci Towers area

General information
- Status: Completed
- Type: Residential/Office
- Location: Tel Aviv, Israel
- Coordinates: 32.07390°N 34.78548°E
- Construction started: 2017
- Completed: 2023
- Owner: Acro Group

Height
- Roof: 155.2 m (509 ft)

Technical details
- Structural system: Reinforced concrete
- Floor count: 42 (+7 underground)

Design and construction
- Architect: Yashar Architects
- Developer: Israel Canada
- Main contractor: Ashtrom Group

The Da Vinci Towers (Hebrew: מִגְדָּלִי דָה וִינצִ'י) is a mixed-use skyscraper complex in Tel Aviv, Israel. Built between 2017 and 2023, the complex consists of two twin towers standing at 155.2 m (509 ft) with 42 floors each. They share the title of the current 28th tallest buildings in Israel.

== History ==
The towers are located at the northeast corner of the intersection of Kaplan Street and Da Vinci Street in Tel Aviv.

At the beginning of the second decade of the 21st century, the Ministry of Defense cleared a ten-dunam plot of land at the southwestern edge of the Camp Rabin, adjacent to the Kanarit Towers, which serve as the Air Force headquarters. Upon its clearance, the plot was used as a parking lot, and in 2015 the Israel Land Authority issued a tender for its sale. The tender was won by the companies Israel Canada and Acro Real Estate, who paid 830 million NIS for it.

The towers were designed by Yashar Architects and built by Ashtrom. Construction began in 2017 and was expected to last 5 years, but was completed in 2023. The two towers are connected on one floor by a swimming pool. On the ground floor of the towers is a courtyard open to the public.

As part of this project, two high-rise buildings, 8 and 11 stories high, were also built, which will be used as rental apartments, for offices, commerce and public uses. The project includes 412 apartments, of which about 40 are intended for rental.

During the Iranian attack on Israel in June 2025, about a year after the towers opened, the North Tower suffered a direct hit on its lower floors caused by an Iranian missile. Before the damage, the state published a tender for the sale of 40 apartments in the tower, intended for rent, at a minimum price of 101 million NIS, but after the damage, the minimum price dropped to 43 million NIS, considering the worsened condition of the apartments.

== See also ==
- List of tallest buildings in Tel Aviv
- List of tallest buildings in Israel
