= Moore Yaski Sivan Architects =

Architecture firm in Israel

- Formation: 1965
- Founder: Avraham Yaski
- Type: Architecture firm
- Headquarters: Israel
- Services: Architecture, urban design
- Employees: 150

Moore Yaski Sivan architects, or MYS architects, is an architecture firm in Israel. It was founded in 1965 by Avraham Yaski, and has been involved in some of the most high-profile skyscraper projects in the country, such as the Azrieli Center, YOO Towers and Tzameret Towers.

== The firm ==
MYS architects is a result of the fusion of the Yaski–Sivan Architects firm, conducted by Yossi Sivan and Avraham Yaski, and the Moore Architects firm, conducted by Yitzhak Moore and Amihud Moore, taking place in 2006. As of 2019, MYS Architects is the largest architecture firm in Israel, listing around 150 professional employees.

The firm's work has been featured in international architectural publications, including Wallpaper* and ArchDaily.

== Projects ==
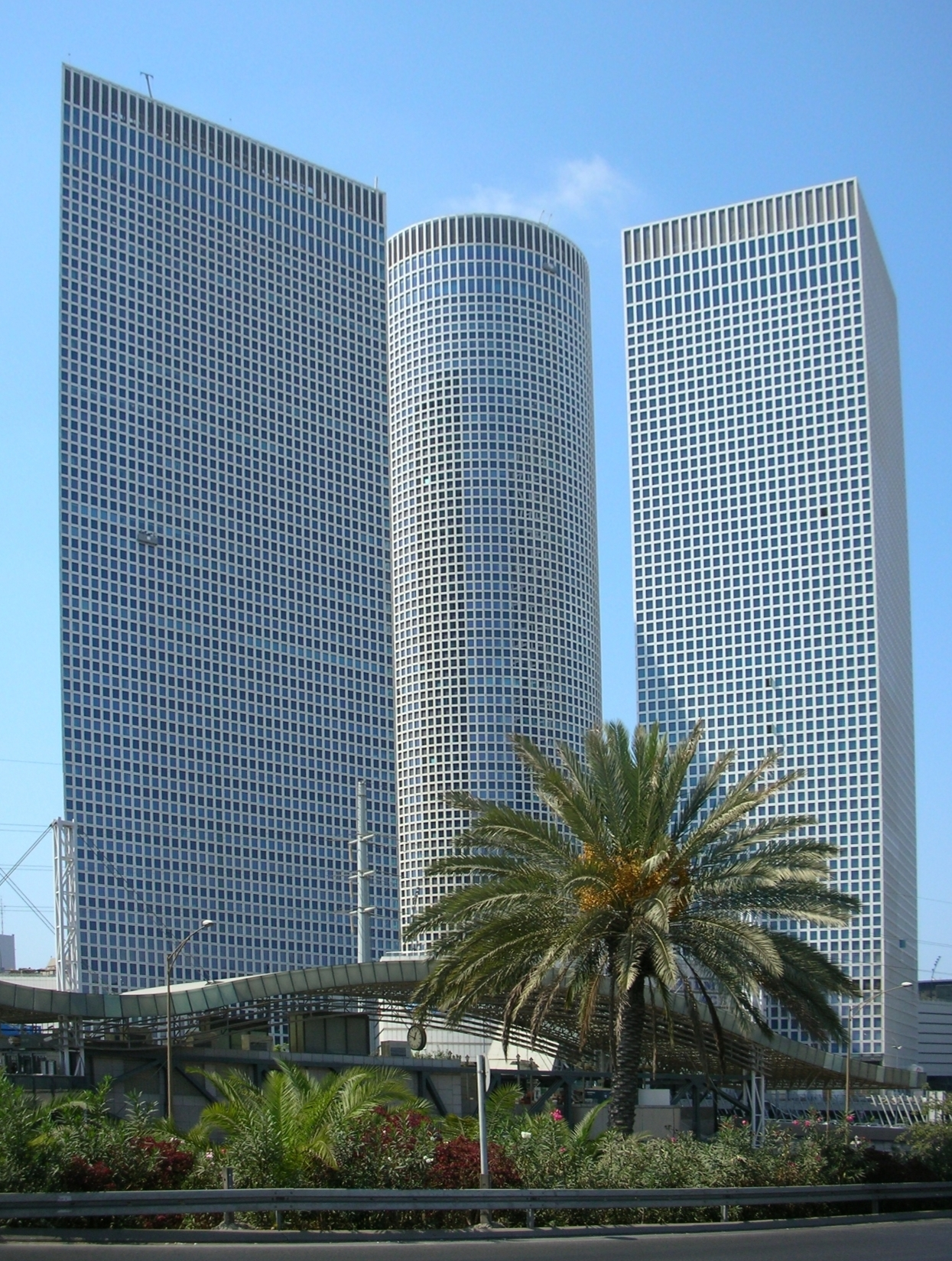
Azrieli Center

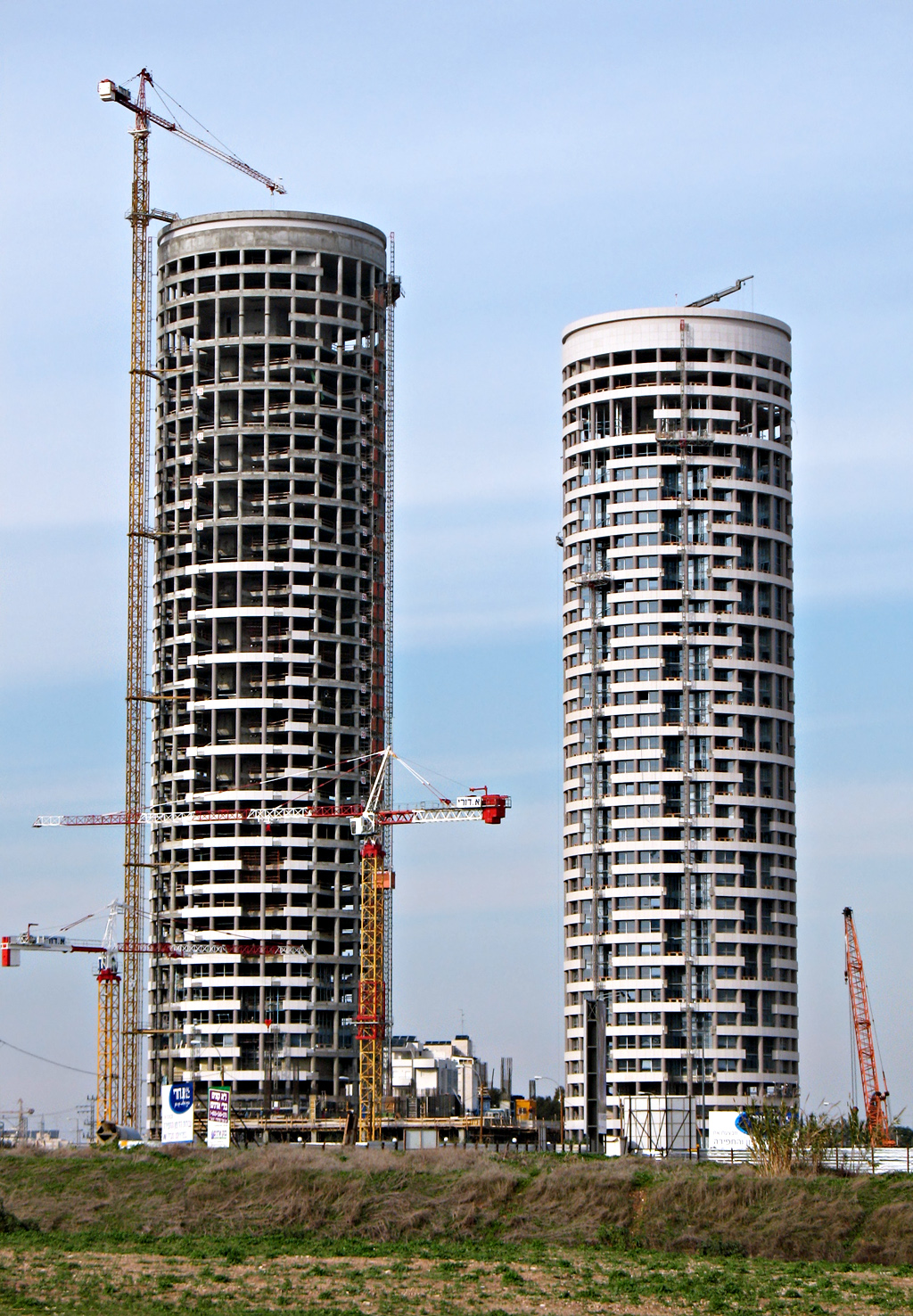
YOO Towers

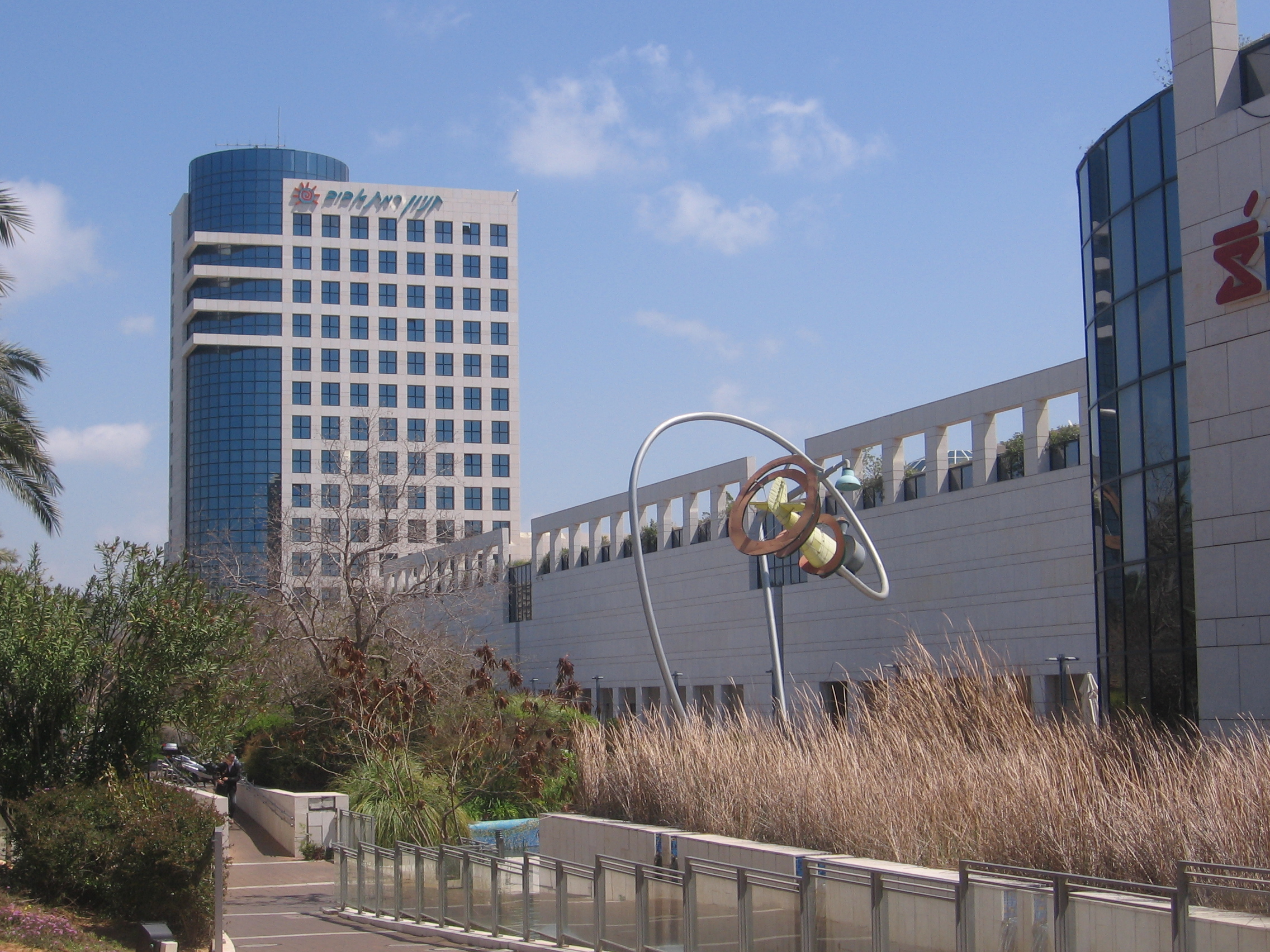
Ramat-Aviv Mall

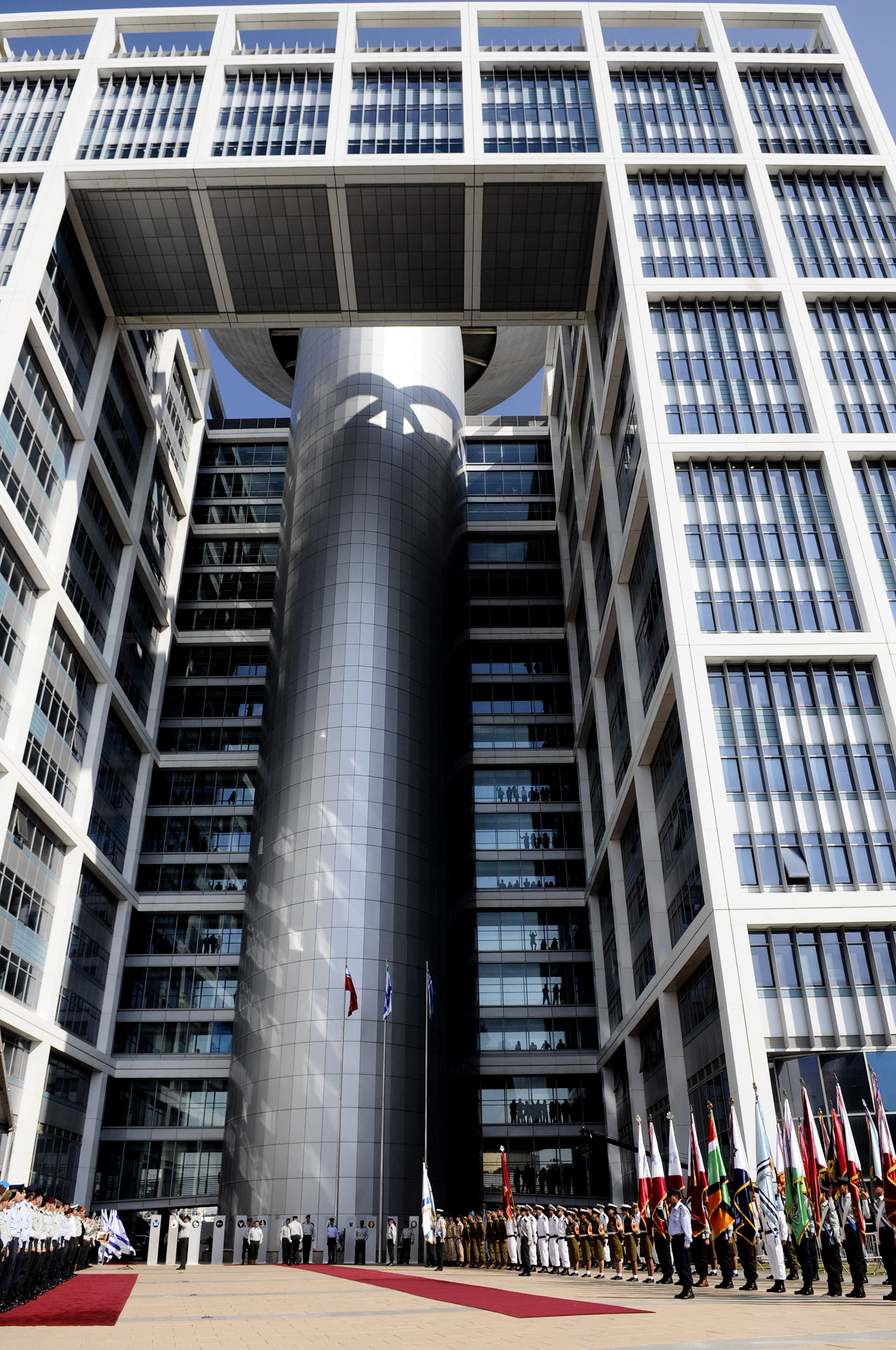
Matcal Tower

MYS Architects' portfolio comprises residential and office skyscraper, malls, medical centers, hotels and urban design, with projects undertaken in countries all over the world, such as England, Greece, Cyprus, Vietnam, India, Poland, Romania, Serbia, Ukraine, Russia, Albania, Bosnia, Bulgaria, Croatia, Czech Republic, Georgia, Hungary, Kazakhstan and Montenegro.

MYS architects has been involved in the following projects:

Residential
Name	City
Manhattan Tower	Tel Aviv
Opera Tower	Tel Aviv
Tzameret Towers	Tel Aviv
YOO Towers	Tel Aviv

Mixed Development
Name	City
Azrieli Center	Tel Aviv
Ramat-Aviv Mall	Tel Aviv
Rubinstein Tower	Tel Aviv
The Twin Towers	Ramat Gan
Arlozorov Young Towers	Tel Aviv
Lessin Tower & Complex	Tel Aviv

Office
Name	City
Africa–Israel Tower	Tel Aviv
Alrov Tower	Tel Aviv
Bank Discount Tower	Tel Aviv
BSR Towers	Bnei Brak/Ramat Gan
Elco Tower	Tel Aviv
Matcal Tower	Tel Aviv
Opera Tower	Tel Aviv
Platinum Tower	Tel Aviv

Public
Name	City
Police Headquarters	Tel Aviv
Smolarz Auditorium, Tel Aviv University	Tel Aviv

Medical
Name	City
Assuta Hospital	Tel Aviv
Beit Halohem	Tel Aviv
Hertzfeld Geriatric Hospital	Gedera
Levinstain Hospital	Ra'anana
Shalvata Mental Health Center	Hod Hasharon
