= Alon Towers =

Skyscrpaer complex in Tel Aviv, Israel

- מִגְדָּלִי אַלּוֹן (Hebrew)
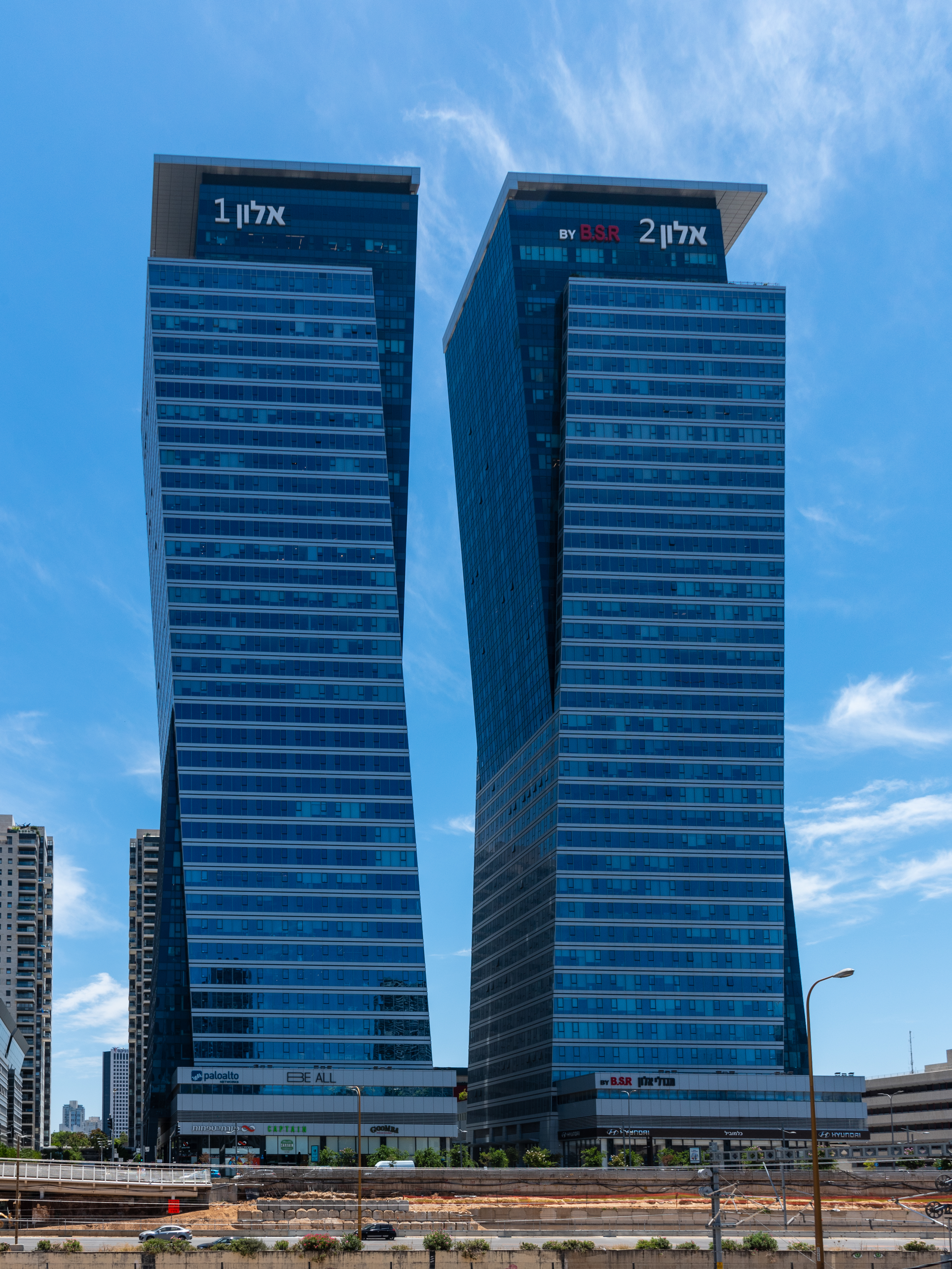
- Interactive map of the Alon Towers area

General information
- Status: Completed
- Type: Office
- Location: Tel Aviv, Israel, 94 Yigal Alon Street
- Coordinates: 32.06849°N 34.79414°E
- Construction started: 2013
- Completed: 2017

Height
- Roof: 161.7 m (531 ft)

Technical details
- Structural system: Concrete
- Floor count: 42
- Lifts/elevators: 14 (each)

Design and construction
- Architect: Barely Levitzky Kassif Architects
- Developer: B.S.R. Group
- Main contractor: Ashtrom Group; Electra Construction

The Alon Towers (Hebrew: מִגְדָּלִי אַלּוֹן, lit. 'Oak Towers') is an office skyscraper complex in Tel Aviv, Israel. Built between 2013 and 2017, the complex consists of two twin towers standing at 161.7 m (531 ft) with 42 floors each. They share the title of the current 18th tallest buildings in Israel.

== History ==
The pair of towers are located adjacent to and south of the Electra Tower, in the complex where the "Argaz" factory was located. The buildings are 161.7 m (531 ft) tall with 40 floors each, with a 6-story parking basement with space for 2,200 cars. Each tower has 14 elevators.

In 2001, the Tel Aviv Local Planning and Building Committee approved the project plan, as part of a change to the City Building Plan (TABA) in the Bitzaron neighborhood, allowing for high-rise construction in the complex, within which buildings of up to 50 floors were approved on Yigal Alon Street.

In 2010, Shalom Hagai, owner of the Arkaz Group, sold the complex for approximately 400 million shekels to the BSR Group. This operation established a purchasing group in which the insurance companies "Migdal" and "Harel" furtherly purchased the north tower, and about a hundred law firms, accountants, insurance agents and advertising agencies. Appraisers and engineers purchased spaces in the south tower. The project's architects were the firm of Bareli Levitsky Kassif Architects, and it extends over an area of approximately 20 dunams of land leased from the Tel Aviv Municipality and the Israel Lands Administration.

Construction of the towers began in 2014 and was completed at the end of 2017. The main construction contractors were Ashtrom and Electra Construction. The concrete supplier for the project was Readymix, and the building frame was built by the Turkish company Yilmazlar.

In May 2017, information security company Palo Alto Networks leased 4 floors of offices in the towers. And today (2025) more than half of the Alon 1 Tower is in use by the company.

In 2018, construction began on a new building for the Tmu-na Theater, which will relocate its location as part of the Alon Towers project. The cost of building the theater is being financed by the developers of the towers as part of public assignments that the municipality imposed as a condition for approving the plan. The theater will be housed in a 2,400 square meter building owned by the Tel Aviv-Yafo Municipality. As of 2022, the theater has not moved.

== Gallery ==
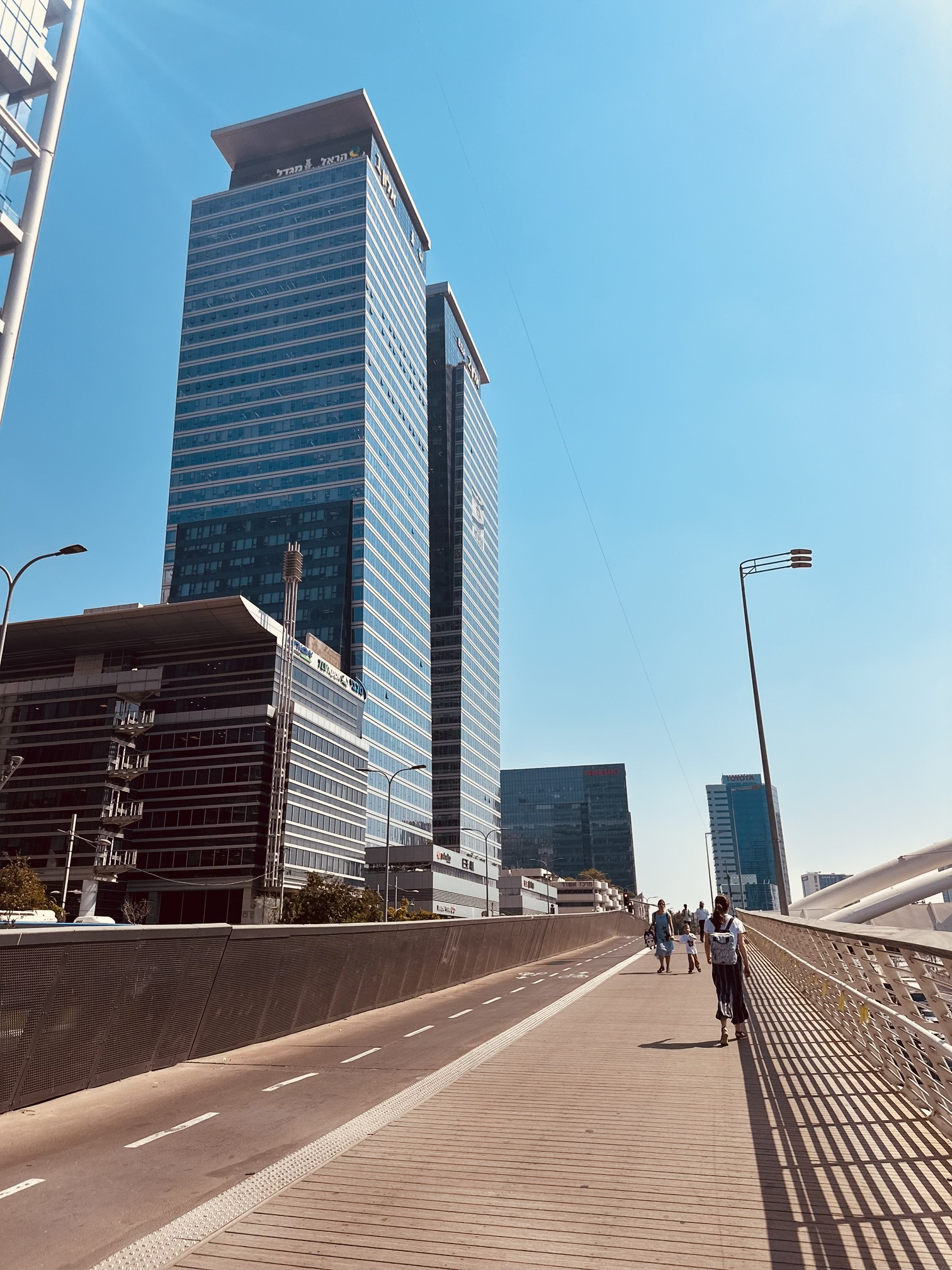
The towers seen from the Yigal Alon Street

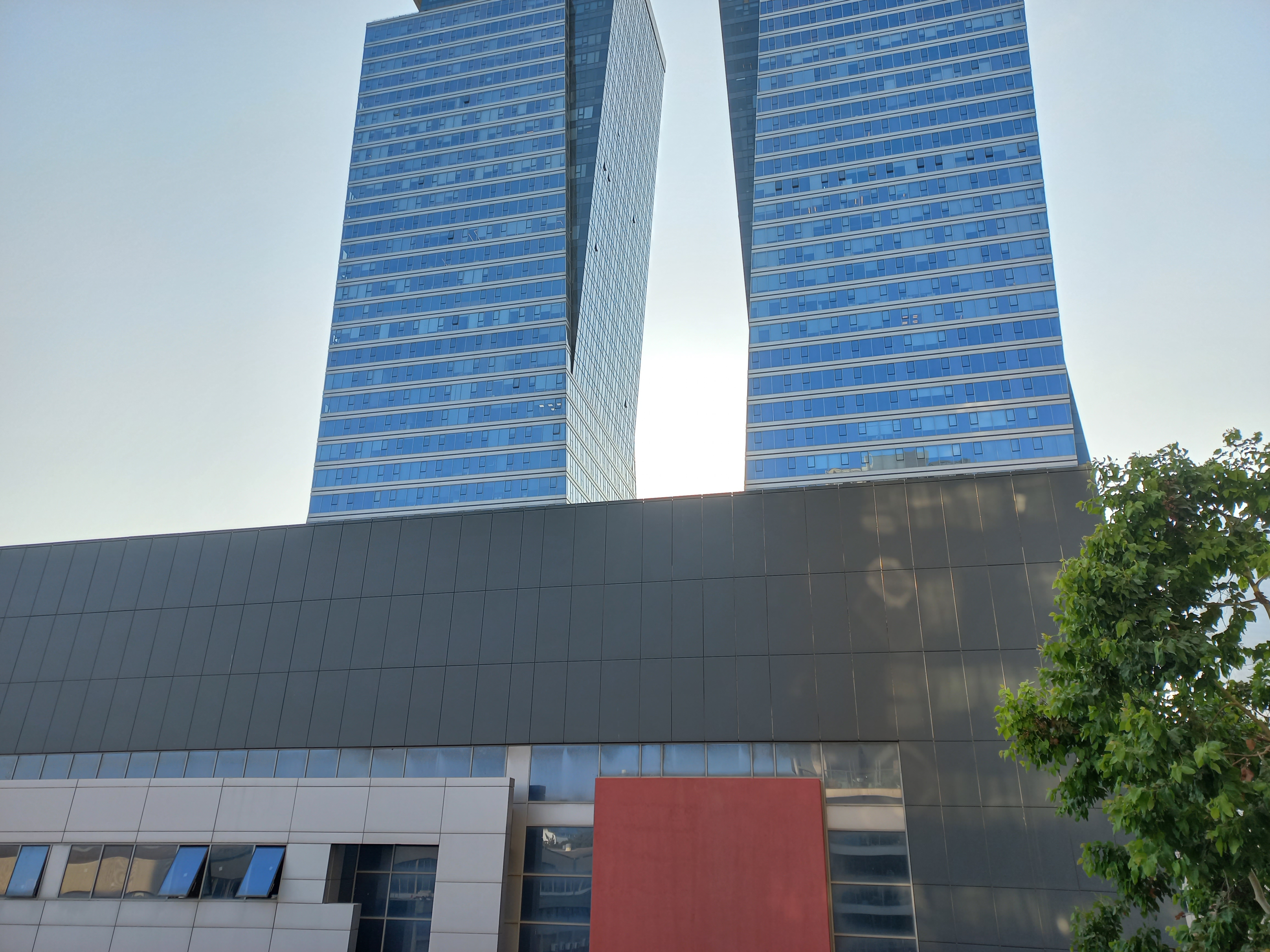
The towers at ground level

== See also ==
- List of tallest buildings in Tel Aviv
- List of tallest buildings in Israel
