= Midtown Tel Aviv =

Skyscraper complex in Tel-Aviv, Israel

- מגדלי מידטאון (Hebrew)
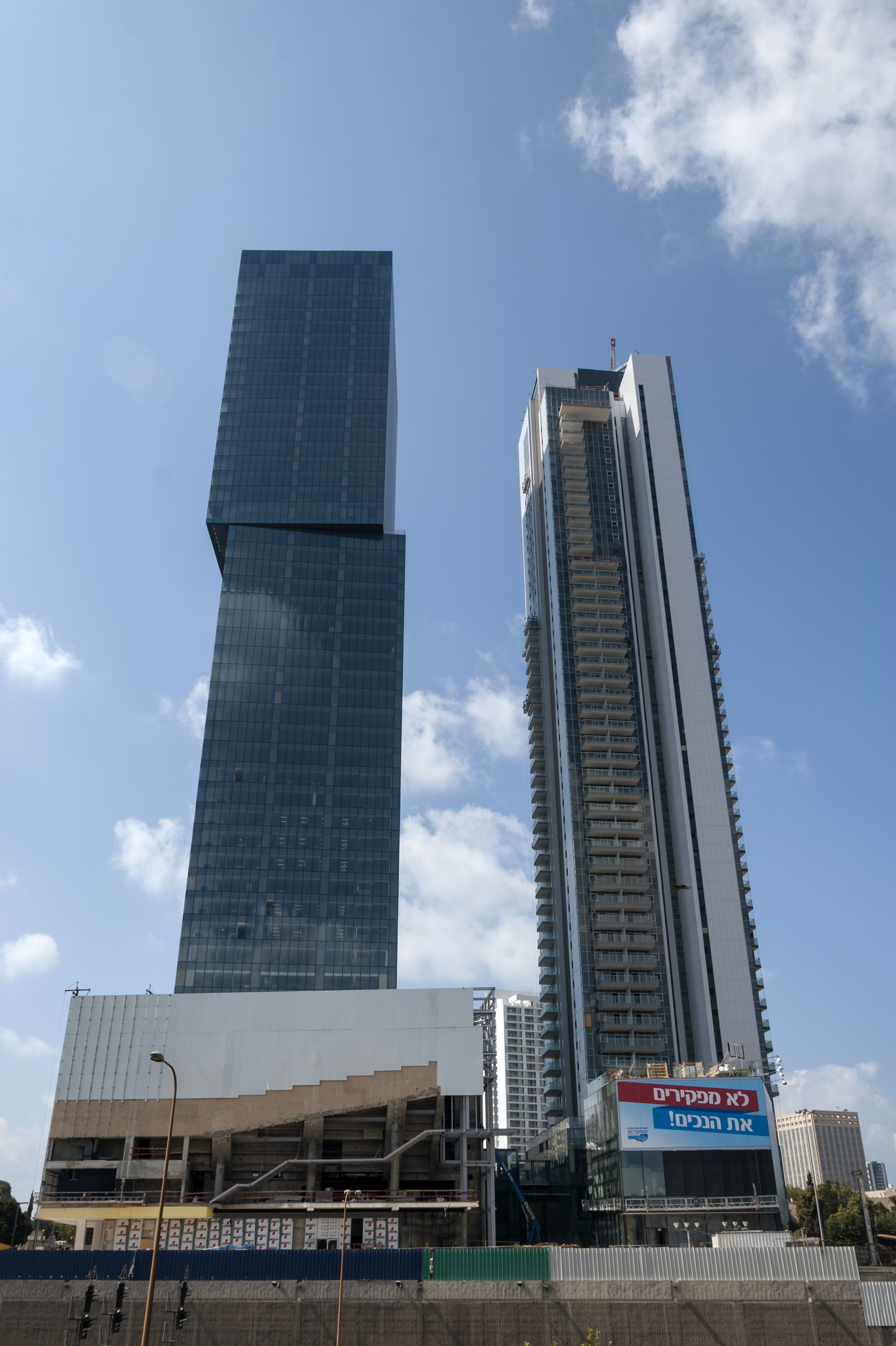
- The Residential Tower (right) and the Office Tower (left)
- Interactive map of the Midtown Tel Aviv area

General information
- Status: Completed
- Type: Mixed-use: Office, Residential
- Location: Tel Aviv, Israel, 144 Menachem Begin Road, Tel Aviv-Yafo, Israel
- Coordinates: 32.07714°N 34.79352°E
- Construction started: 2013
- Completed: 2018

Height
- Roof: 196 m (643 ft) (Office Tower); 183 m (600 ft) (Residential Tower)

Technical details
- Structural system: Reinforced concrete
- Floor count: 50 (+7 Underground each)

Design and construction
- Architect: Moshe Tzur
- Developer: Canada-Israel Ltd.
- Structural engineer: David Engineers
- Main contractor: Electra Construction

Website
- Midtown Tel Aviv

Midtown Tel Aviv (Hebrew: מגדלי מידטאון) is a mixed-use skyscraper complex in the Nahalat Yitzhak district of Tel Aviv, Israel. Built between 2013 and 2020, the complex consists of two towers, the Midtown Office Tower standing at 196 m (643 ft) and the Midtown Residential Tower standing at 183 m (600 ft) tall, both rising to 50 floors. The Office Tower is the current 2nd tallest building in Tel Aviv.

== History ==
The towers were built on the territory of the Tnuva dairy that operated there between 1953 and 2002, and the nearby junction was named after her "Tnuva Junction". After the closing of the dairy, the lot became a parking lot that operated until 2012 . In 2011, a partnership of the companies Israel Canada, Electra Real Estate and Eurocom Real Estate purchased the lot for NIS 530 million. In 2013, excavation work began on the lot.

In February 2013 it was announced that the 16 lower floors in the office tower were sold to Ernst & Young, but a year later the firm expanded the purchase to 21 floors for NIS 342 million. In March 2014, it was announced that the top three floors of the office tower, with an area of 5,000 square meters, were sold for NIS 88.5 million, these floors are occupied by the WeWork company, which located its Israeli headquarters on the top floor.

In January 2017, the Magorit Real Estate Fund purchased 34 apartments in the residential tower, for approximately NIS 71.4 million.

In 2023, the Shaul Hamelech station on the red line of the light rail was opened on the adjacent street, one of whose entrances is linked to the project.

=== Architecture ===
The Midtown towers were designed by the office of the architect Moshe Tzur. They include a 197-meter-high, fifty-story office tower, with a total area of approximately 75,000 square meters. The design of the tower is like two boxes placed on top of each other with a slight offset. The lower box rises to a height of 32 floors and the other floors of the tower are moved by a slight rotation. The area of each floor is about 1,660 square meters. The nearby residential tower rises to a height of 183 meters and includes 50 floors with 338 apartments. At the time of its completion, it was the tallest residential tower in Israel. The residential tower is served by six elevators and a swimming pool . The tower includes 34 apartments for discounted rent, owned by the Municipality of Tel Aviv-Yafo and managed by the municipal housing company Ezera and Tesron.

A commercial center with an area of approximately 19,000 square meters was built in the project complex. Part of the center extends to the basement level and is connected to the Shaul Hamelech station on the red line of the light rail. An urban square will be built on the ground level that is also shared by the two towers that are expected to be built on the adjacent Clalit Health Services lot. Two to three story commercial buildings were built in the square. In the complex, the developers also built municipal services, such as kindergartens and a sports hall with 480 seats, to the east of the office tower, as a public task according to the requirement of the Municipality of Tel Aviv Jaffa. The sports hall was built for multipurpose use for basketball, handball, gymnastics, and more for teams in lower leagues, less popular branches and as a training facility.

A new access road is expected to be paved to the south of the complex, and in the future a new bridge is expected to be built over the Ayalon lanes that will connect Emek Bracha Street to the complex from the east. A pedestrian bridge is expected to be built in the western direction. The total area of the offices, residences and commerce built in the project is about 125 thousand square meters. In the complex, five parking floors were built in an area of about 82 thousand square meters. The cost of the project is about NIS 2.6 billion.

== Buildings ==
Name	Image	Height m (ft)	Floors	Function	Construction period	Ref
Office Tower		196 m (643 ft)	50	Office	2013–2017	
Residential Tower (right)		183 m (600 ft)	50	Residential	2014–2018	

== See also ==
- List of tallest buildings in Tel Aviv
- List of tallest buildings in Israel
