= HaArba'a Towers =

Skyscraper complex in Tel Aviv, Israel

- מגדלי הארבעה (Hebrew)
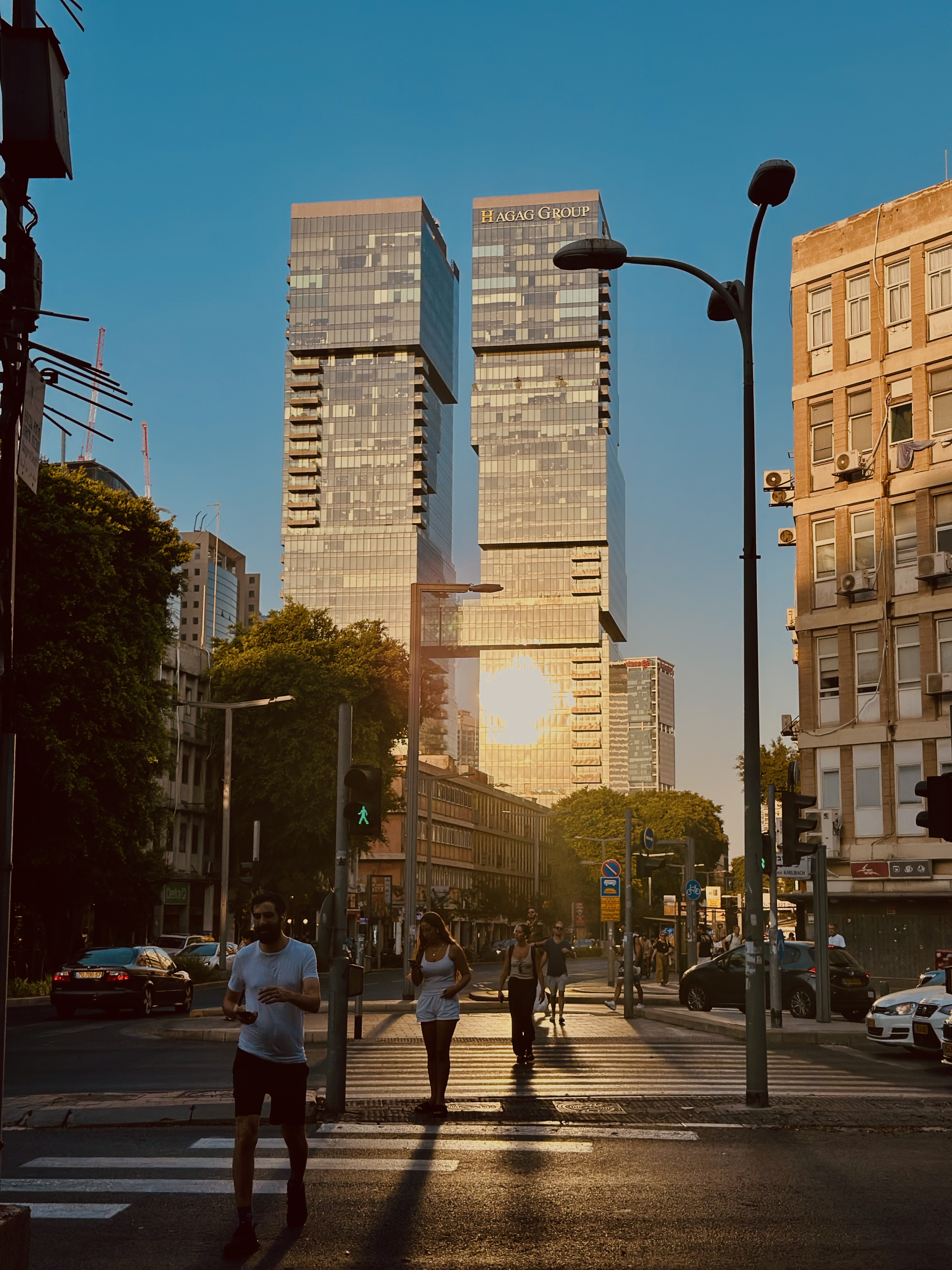
- Interactive map of the HaArba'a Towers area

General information
- Status: Completed
- Type: Office
- Location: HaHashmonaim St., Southern Kirya, Tel Aviv, Israel
- Coordinates: 32.069722°N 34.786667°E
- Construction started: 2012
- Completed: 2017

Height
- Roof: 160 m (520 ft); 146 m (479 ft)

Technical details
- Structural system: Reinforced concrete
- Floor count: 38 (+4 undergr.) (Tower 1); 35 (+4 undergr.) (Tower 2)
- Floor area: 135,000 m^{2} (1,450,000 sq ft)

Design and construction
- Architect: Moshe Zur Architects
- Developer: Hagag Group

The HaArba'a Towers (Hebrew: מגדלי הארבעה) (also known as The Four Towers) is an office skyscraper complex in Tel Aviv, Israel. Built between 2013 and 2017, the complex consists of two towers standing at 160 m (520 ft) tall with 38 floors (Tower 1) respectively 146 m (479 ft) tall with 35 floors (Tower 2).

== History ==
In June 2009, the brothers Moshe and Yigal Gindi won a tender from the Israel Land Administration to purchase the land, covering an area of six dunams. At the time, a parking lot was operating on the site . The brothers offered 151.5 million shekels, the highest bid among five, to which they added development payments in the amount of 18.4 million shekels. Their bid was 25 million shekels (about 20%) higher than the second highest bid in the tender, which was about 125 million shekels. The Hajj Group purchased the land on which the towers were built from the Gindi brothers in September 2010 for NIS 323 million. In June 2011, A. Dori Construction was selected as the operating contractor for the construction of the project at a cost of NIS 351 million.

The towers were planned to be built by the Hajj Group through a purchasing group. However, this did not come to fruition and instead sold most of the project to various parties during construction. Among other things, businessman Teddy Sagi purchased the top four floors of one of the two towers for NIS 80 million. The local government center purchased 3 floors for 50 million shekels.

In June 2013, as part of the transfer of unused rights from buildings for preservation, the Tel Aviv Local Planning and Building Committee approved the expansion of the buildings by nine additional floors. The Hajj Group paid the White City Buildings Company NIS 34 million for the transfer of rights. The rights were transferred from eight buildings for strict preservation included in the Tel Aviv preservation plan. The agreement allowed the old buildings to be renovated.

During construction, in August 2014, a beam fell from the tower onto Harabeh Street, causing property damage, but no injuries.

Construction of the towers was completed during 2017 and they were occupied starting in early 2018.

In January 2020, Clal Insurance purchased the four floors owned by Teddy Sagi for NIS 129 million.

In the summer of 2020, the Hajj brothers opened a business lounge on the floor connecting the two towers, which includes a conference room, bar, and restaurant called "Pop&Pope".

=== Design ===
The four towers were designed by the office of architect Moshe Tzur. Both serve as office towers, 160 and 146 meters high. In front of Givon Square (in the lot separating the backs of Hashmonaim and Arba'eh Streets). The towers are designed in the form of cubes placed at different angles on top of each other, including a "hanging" lounge and a shared lobby. The towers' lobbies and lounge were designed by Giorgio Armani. The shared lounge is based on a bridge, which connects the two buildings on the 15th floor. Underneath the towers is a six-story underground parking garage, with the top three of them serving as paid public parking.

The building's management company is "Property Partnerships".

== Gallery ==
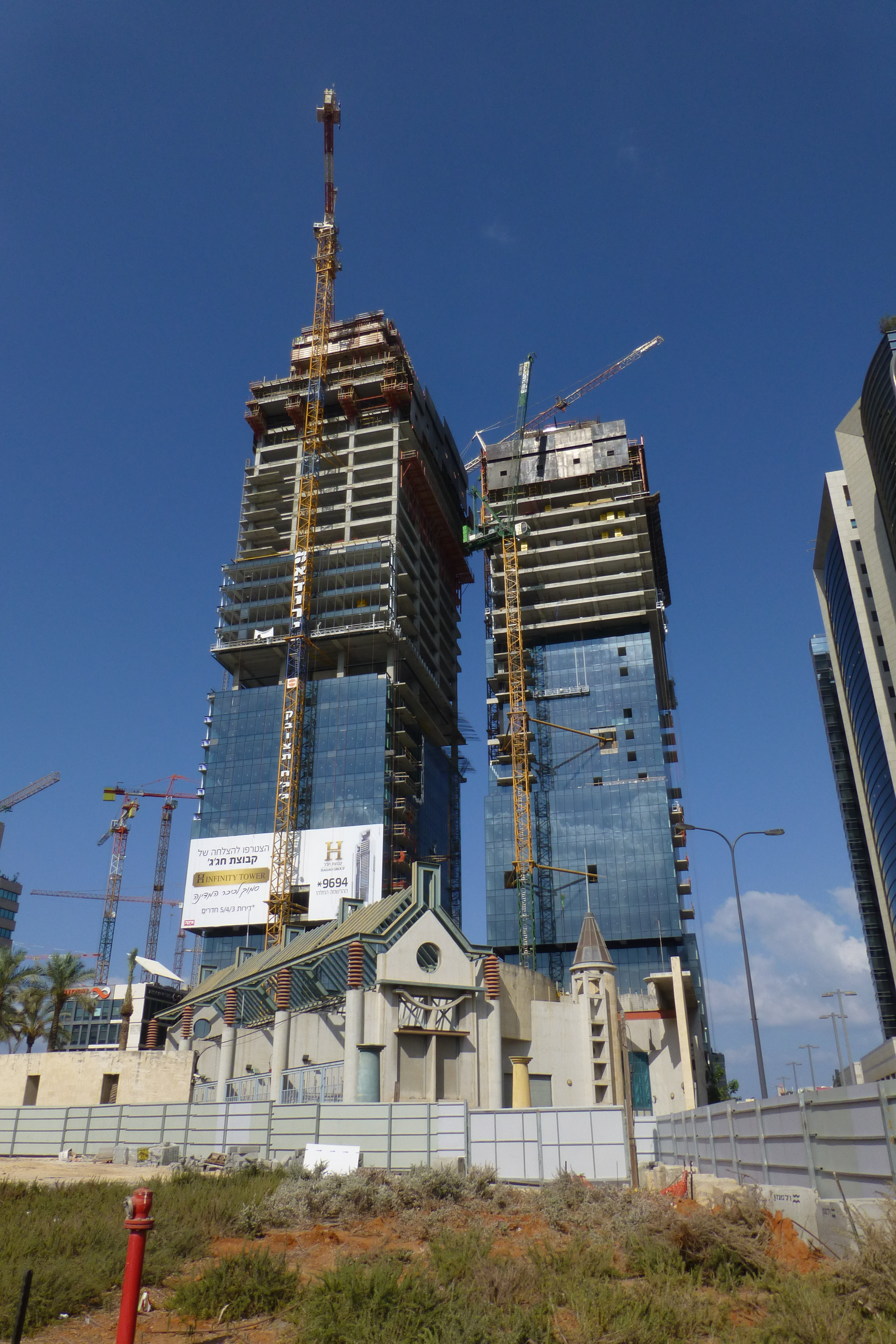
The towers under construction in 2015

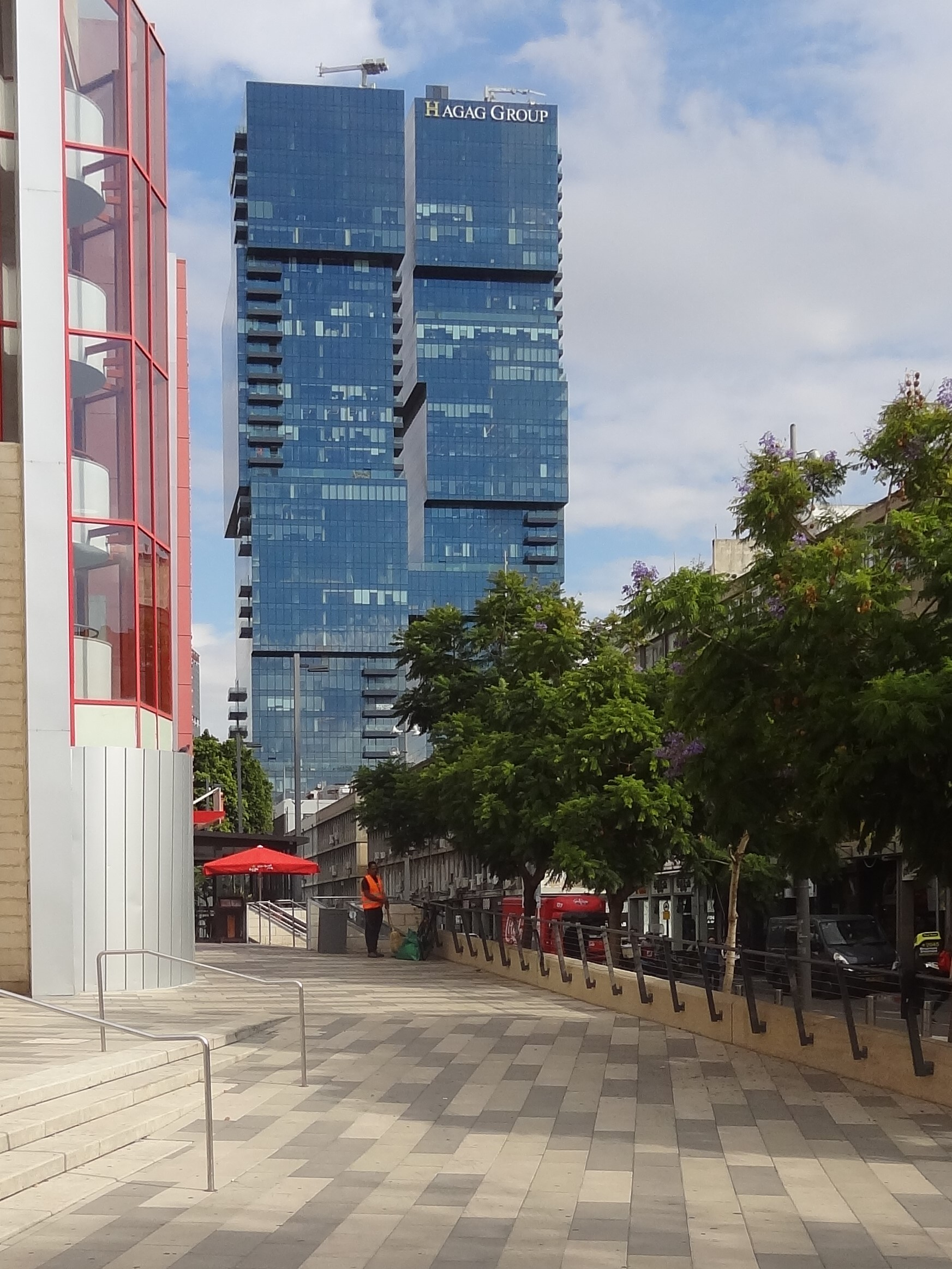
The towers seen from the direction of the Tel Aviv Cinematheque

== See also ==
- List of tallest buildings in Tel Aviv
- List of tallest buildings in Israel
