= Rom Tel Aviv =

Skyscraper in Tel-Aviv, Israel

- מגדל רום (Hebrew)
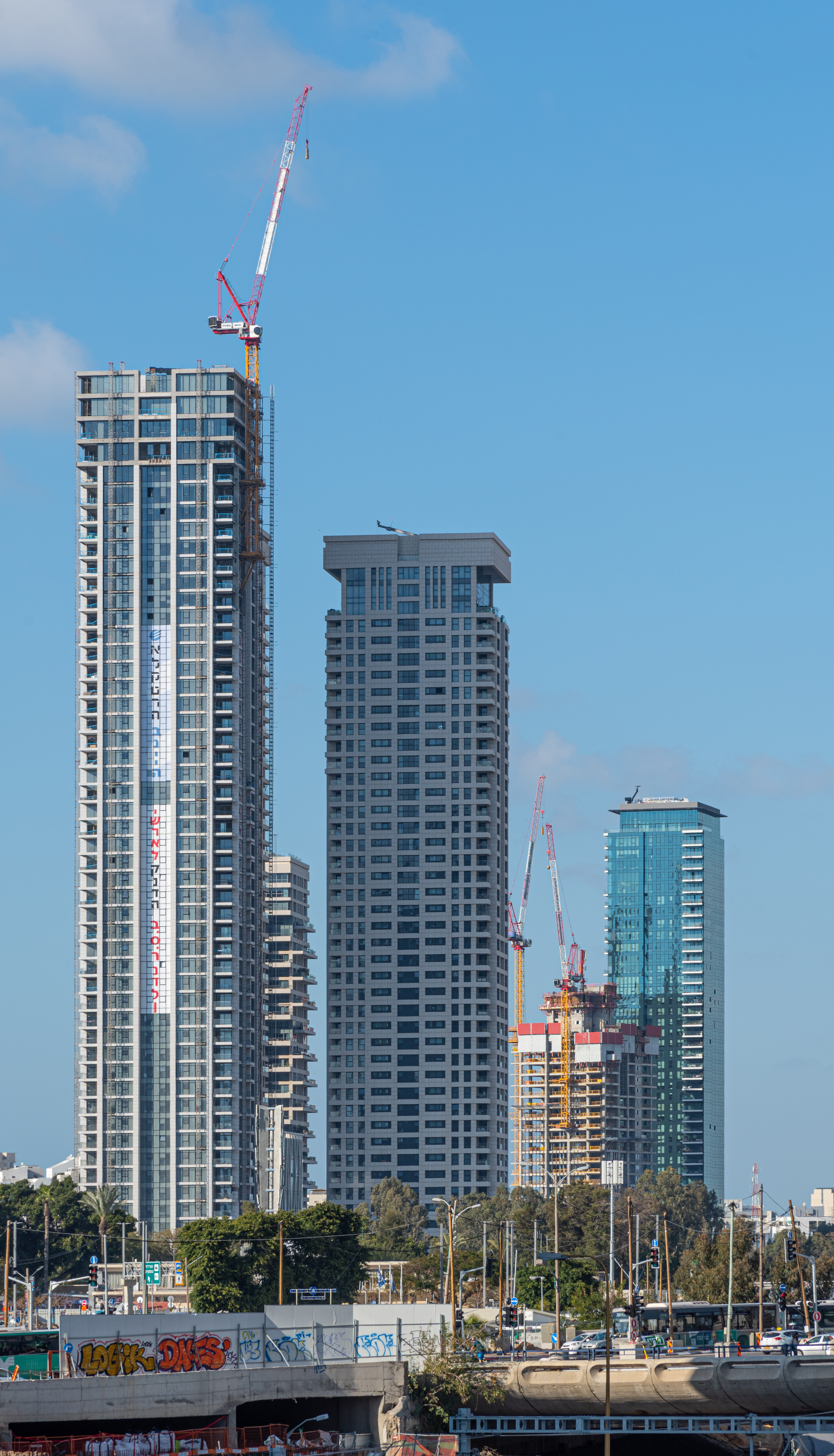
- Rom Tower (left) under construction
- Interactive map of the Rom Tel Aviv area

General information
- Status: Completed
- Type: Residential
- Location: Tel Aviv, Israel, 2 Nissim Aloni Street, Tel Aviv-Yafo, Israel
- Coordinates: 32.08714°N 34.79678°E
- Construction started: 2016
- Completed: 2021

Height
- Roof: 173.1 m (568 ft)

Technical details
- Structural system: Concrete
- Floor count: 50 (+4 Underground each)

Design and construction
- Architect: Yashar Architects
- Developer: Israel Canada Ltd. B.S.R. Group
- Structural engineer: David Engineers
- Main contractor: Electra Constructio

Website
- Rom Tower

Rom Tel Aviv (Hebrew: מגדל רום) also known as the Migdal Rom is a residential skyscraper in the Park Tzameret district of Tel Aviv, Israel. Built between 2016 and 2021, the tower stands at 173.1 m (568 ft) tall with 50 floors and is the current 6th tallest building in Tel Aviv.

== History ==
The lot on which the tower was built was purchased by the companies Israel Canada and Beser in June 2014, for NIS 220 million. It was the 12th lot, and the last one left for construction, in the luxury Park Tzameret tower complex. The tower was built in the format of a purchasing group. The development of the lot, which has an area of about 5 dunams, was delayed for many years due to disputes between the owners of the lot - a group of 50 owners, some of whom contracted with the Besar and some with Israel Canada. The disputes, which even reached a joint dissolution procedure in court, were resolved after the two groups decided to cooperate and establish the project together.

However, after the sale of the lot was agreed upon, Aura real estate company, controlled by the businessman Yaakov Etrakchi, appealed to the district court against the agreement, and demanded that the court order will delay the proceedings of the project, but its request was rejected. Aura's appeal to the district court was submitted about a month after the decision of the Tel Aviv Magistrate's Court, which gave effect to the end of the legal dispute between the owners of the lot. As part of the dissolution proceedings of the partnership that were conducted earlier, an invitation to submit proposals for the purchase of the lot was published, to which Aura approached and offered NIS 200 million. The agreement to purchase the lot was finally signed in June 2015.

The construction of the building began in 2016, by the "Electra Construction" company. At the end of 2020, the tower reached its maximum height and it was populated during 2021. The tower was designed by Yashar Architects and includes 50 floors above ground and four underground floors, about 190 apartments, a swimming pool, a spa and a gym.

== See also ==
- List of tallest buildings in Tel Aviv
- List of tallest buildings in Israel
