= Shalom Meir Tower =

- מִגְדָּל שָׁלוֹם מֵאִיר
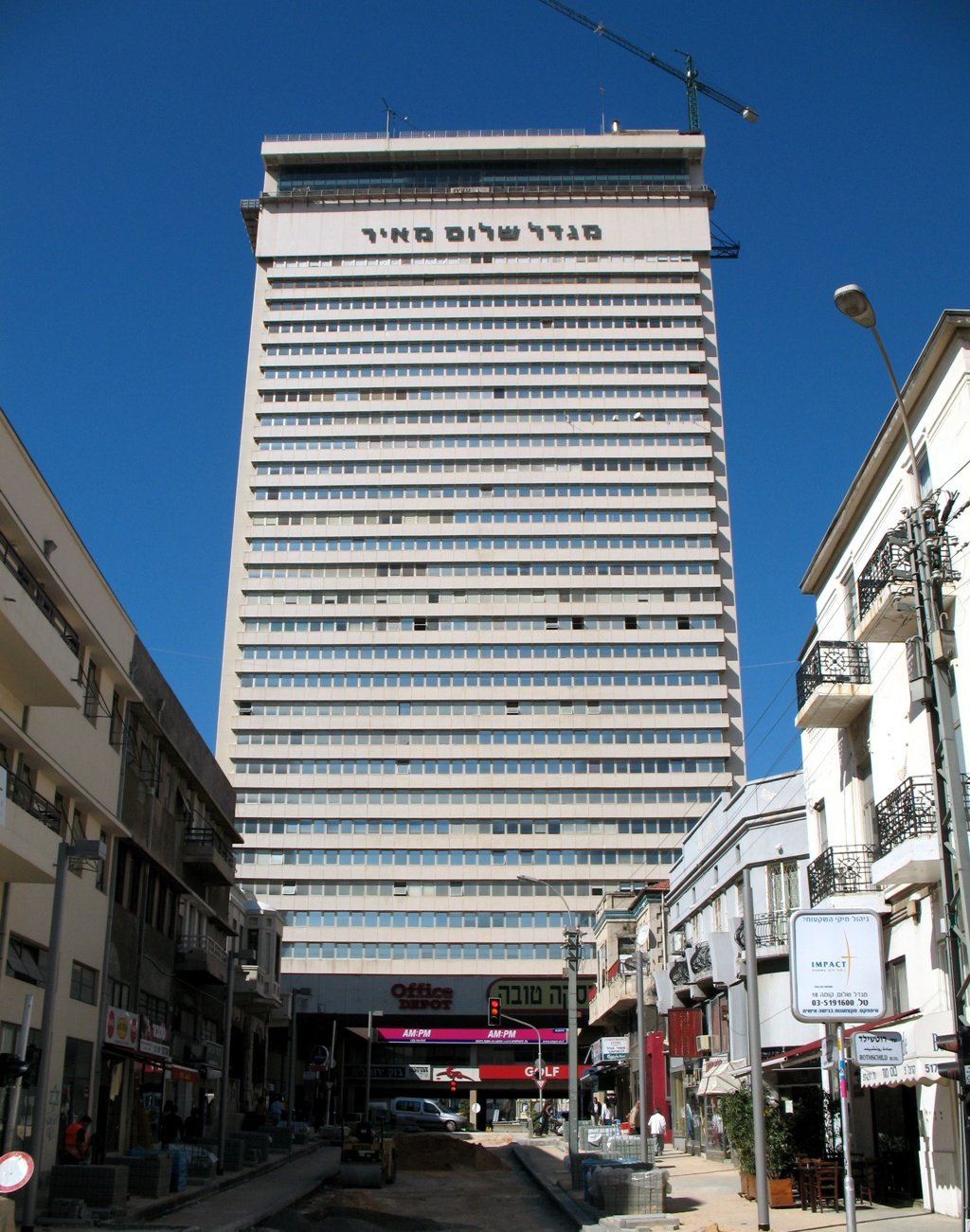
- Interactive map of the Shalom Meir Tower area

General information
- Status: Completed
- Type: Government, Commercial, Residential
- Location: Tel Aviv, Israel
- Coordinates: 32°3′50.47″N 34°46′11.18″E
- Construction started: 1963
- Opening: 1965

Height
- Roof: 129 metres (423 ft)

Technical details
- Floor count: 34

Design and construction
- Architects: Yitzhak Pearlstein, Gideon Ziv, Meir Levy
- Structural engineer: Eliezer Dushnitzky

Shalom Meir Tower (Hebrew: מִגְדָּל שָׁלוֹם מֵאִיר, Migdal Shalom Meir; commonly known as Migdal Shalom, Hebrew: מִגְדָּל שָׁלוֹם, lit. 'Tower of Peace') is an office tower in Tel Aviv, Israel.

== Overview ==
Shalom Meir Tower was designed by architects Yitzhak Pearlstein, Gideon Ziv, and Meir Levy. Migdal Shalom has 34 floors and stands at a height of 129 metres (423 ft).

50,000 cubic meters of concrete, 4,000 tons of steel, 35 km of water pipes, and 500 km of wiring were used in the tower.

When its construction was completed in 1965, it was the tallest building in the Middle East, as well as the tallest in Asia, and rivaled the tallest buildings in Europe in height. It was the last building in Western Asia to be the tallest building in Asia until the Burj Khalifa in Dubai was completed in 2010.

== History ==
The tower was built on the site of the Herzliya Hebrew High School, better known as Herzliya Gymnasium. The school's architecturally and historically significant structure was razed and the school relocated in order to build the tower in 1962. This decision was later regretted and the contour of the Herzliya Gymnasium became the emblem of the Council for Conservation of Heritage Sites in Israel, which was founded partially as a response to the building's fate.

Construction was carried out by the Meir Brothers, Moshe, Mordechai and Menachem Meir, who named it after their father, Reb Shalom-Shachna Meir, born in Sanok in Galicia. Shalom-Shachna Meir married the daughter of a rich manufacturer from the Romanian region of Moldova, where he lived until 1920, becoming a successful businessman as well as a leader of the local Zionists. In 1920 he emigrated to Palestine where he became an important public figure in the early years of Tel Aviv, a member of the town's first city council, and one of the founders of Ramat Gan.

The building has a cream hue tile facade which was created especially for the tower and was manufactured in Italy. A subway station was built under the tower block, but rails were never laid and the station remains empty and disconnected from any rail system.

== Artwork and exhibits ==
The ground-floor retail promenade features a mosaic mural by the Israeli artist Nachum Gutman facing another one by David Sharir. The Shalom Tower now houses the Tel Aviv Center comprising a number of permanent and temporary exhibitions dedicated to the beginnings and development of Tel Aviv.

== Gallery ==
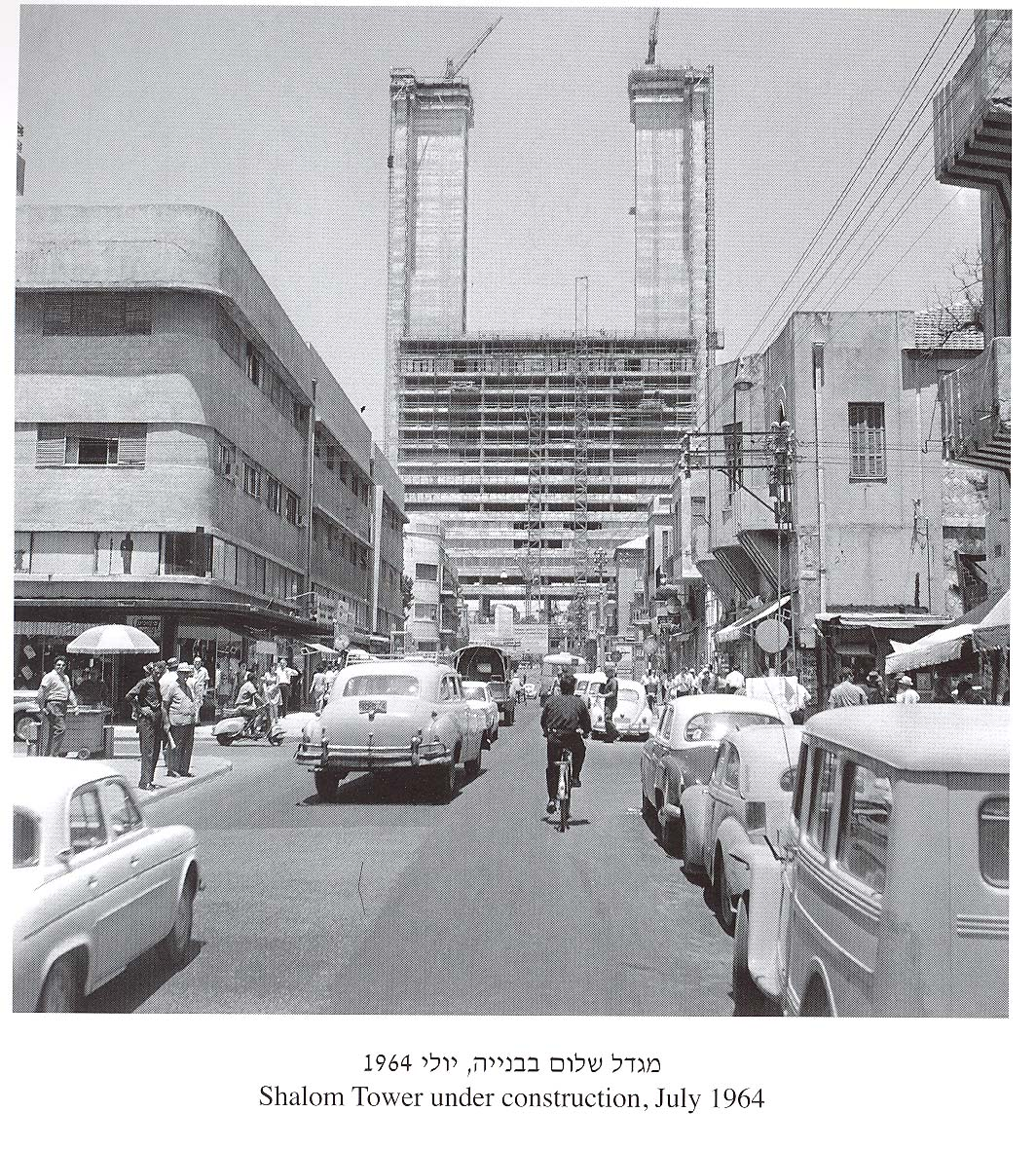
Migdal Shalom under construction, July 1964

Shalom Tower under construction, April 1965

== See also ==
- List of tallest buildings in Israel
- Architecture in Israel
- Economy of Israel

Records
Preceded by Unknown	Tallest building in Israel; 1965–1987; 129 metres (423 ft)	Succeeded by Marganit Tower
