= Tzameret Towers =

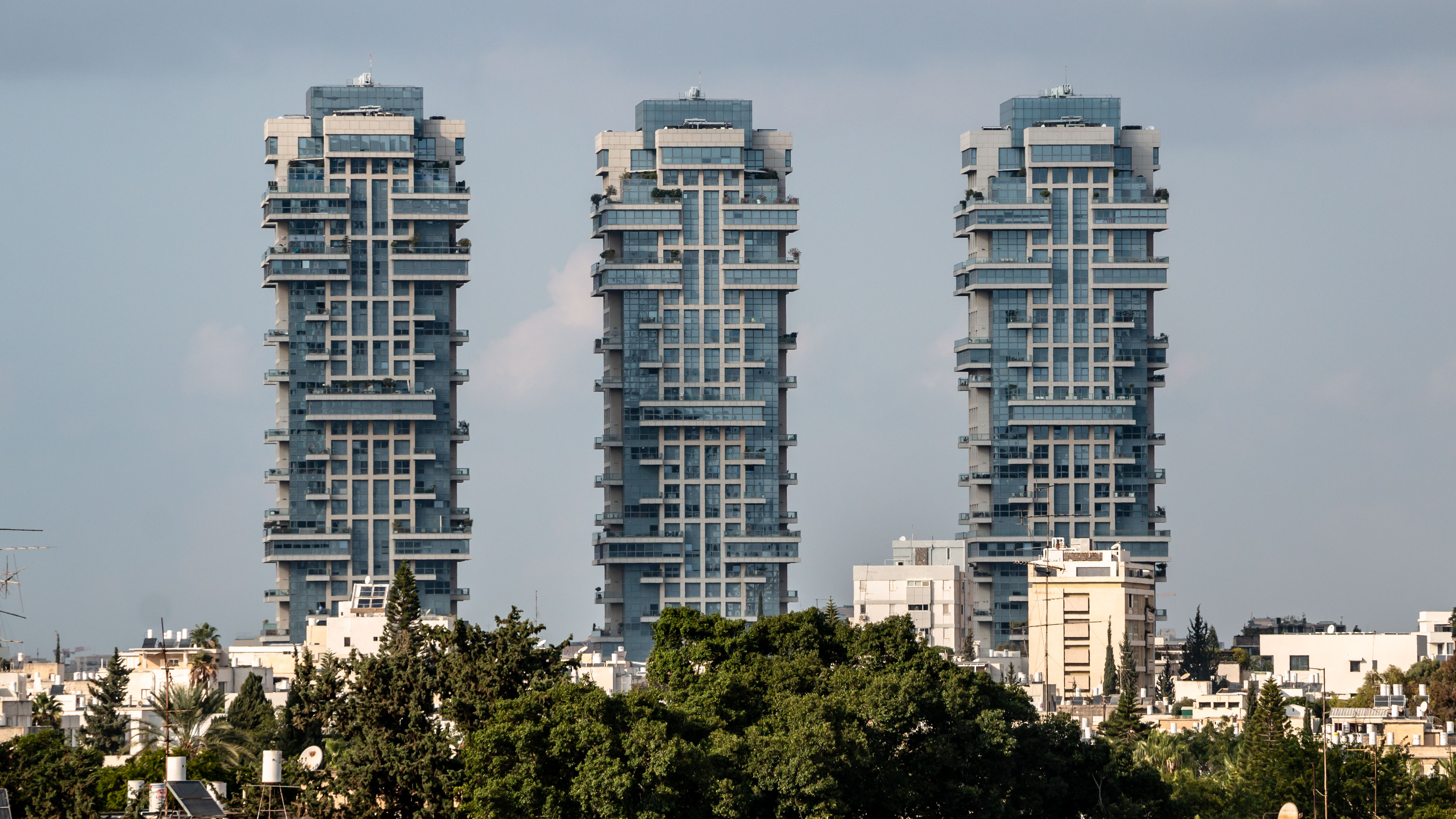
- Interactive map of the Tzameret Towers area

General information
- Status: Completed
- Type: Apartments
- Location: Tel Aviv, Israel
- Coordinates: 32°5′27.02″N 34°47′37.95″E
- Construction started: 1&2: 1999; 3: 2003
- Opening: 1&2: 2002; 3: 2006

Height
- Roof: 123 m (404 ft)

Technical details
- Floor count: 34
- Floor area: 30,000 m^{2} (320,000 sq ft)

Design and construction
- Architect: Moore Yaski Sivan Architects

Tzameret Towers, also known as Akirov Towers, are three 34-story residential towers in Tel Aviv, Israel.

== History ==
The first two towers were completed in 2003, and the third in 2006. The towers were designed by Moore Yaski Sivan Architects. Tower 3 was originally planned as a 140-meter tower containing 140 apartments, but this was scaled down and it was finished to a height almost identical to that of the other towers. The final design contained 120 apartments. This tower topped out in August 2004. The top three floors of Tower 2 contain one of Israel's most expensive apartments, purchased for $10 million, a record-breaking purchase at the time. The total complex contains 360 apartments.

Living in Tzameret Towers became a status symbol, although marketing was accomplished without a sales campaign or public promotion. The building set a new standard for residential buildings, with amenities such as fitness centers and swimming pools that were introduced hereafter into all new luxury complexes. The project has been described as a turning point in Tel Aviv's housing culture.

== Notable residents ==
- Ehud Barak, former Prime Minister of Israel

== See also ==
- List of skyscrapers in Israel
- Architecture of Israel
