= Menora Mivtachim =

Israeli insurance company

- Company type: Public
- Founded: 1935
- Headquarters: Tel Aviv, Israel
- Website: www.menoramivt.co.il

Menora Mivtachim is an Israeli insurance company that is publicly traded on the Tel Aviv Stock Exchange.

== History ==
The company was founded in 1935 as General Liability Office and changed its name to Menora Mivtachim Holdings in 2006. It is headquartered in Tel Aviv, and its products include "life assurance, health insurance, car insurance, business insurance and personal insurance." In January 2018, it was described by The New York Times as "one of Israel's largest financial institutions."

In 2009, The Israeli Ministry of Finance led a probe into Menora Mivtachim funds. In 2010, the company was fined $3.9 million (2010 USD) for issuing loans without requisite securities. Menora cooperated with the investigation and addressed the issues that surfaced.

In 2017, Menora Mivtachim invested "roughly $30 million" in Kushner Companies, which was spent on "a Maryland development." The company also invested $60 million together with Canadian Solar Inc., to develop solar power projects in Israel.

In 2018, Menora Mivtachim joined the strategic team behind IBM's Alpha Zone startup accelerator that focuses on post Seed & Round A funded companies in the fields of Retail, Healthcare, Transport, Energy, Telco and Media.

Menora Mivtachim holds 4% in Wix, after initially investing in 2017 and increasing their investment dramatically in 2018.

== See also ==
- Economy of Israel
