= Tzamarot Ayalon =

Neighborhood of Tel Aviv, Israel

Tzamarot Ayalon צמרות איילון
- Neighborhood
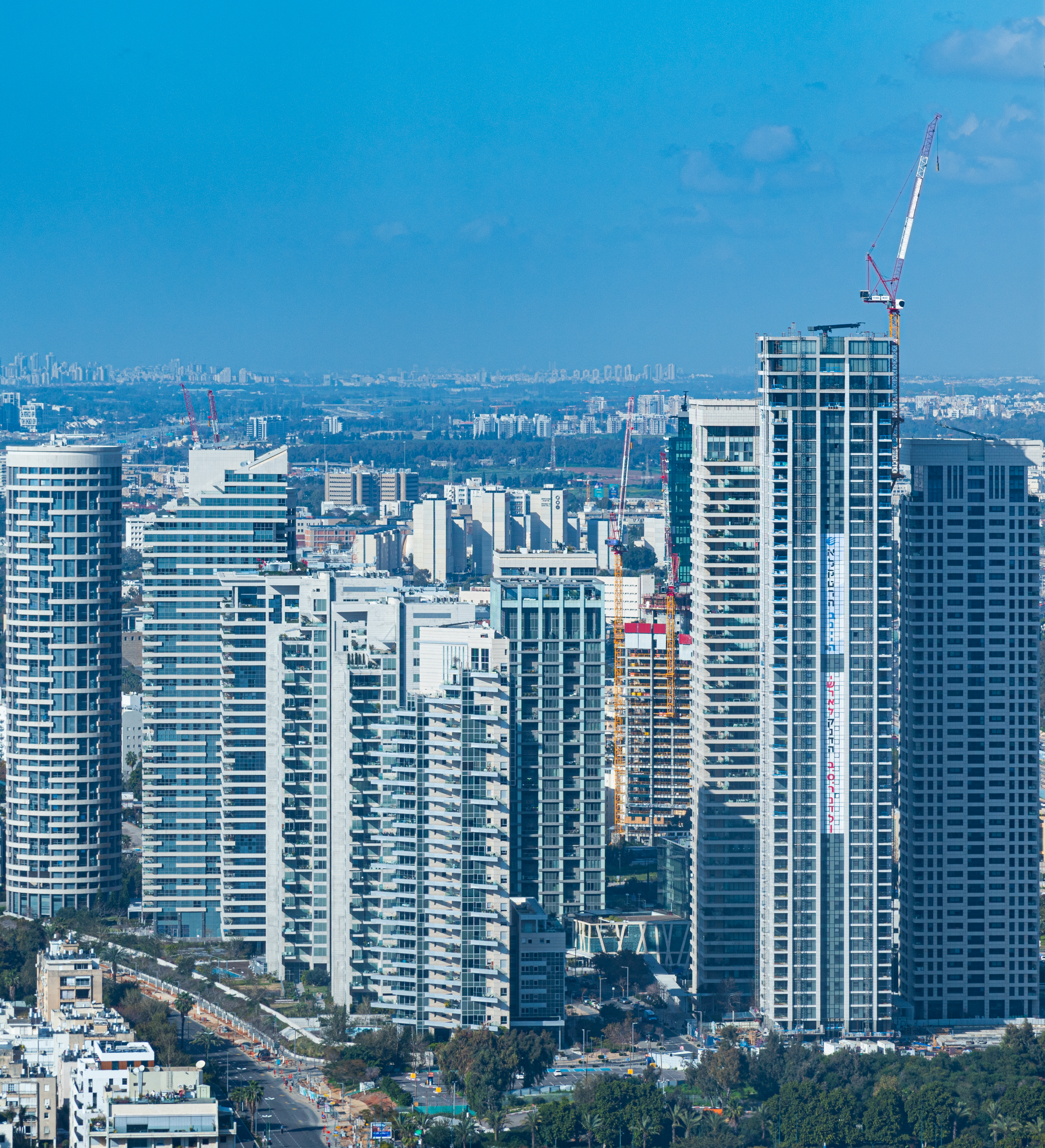
- A view of Park Tzameret from the south, March 2021
- Interactive map of Tzamarot Ayalon
- Country: Israel
- City: Tel Aviv

Area
  - Total: 13.3 ha (33 acres)

Tzamarot Ayalon (Hebrew: צמרות איילון) is a neighborhood of Tel Aviv, Israel, on the east-central side of the city. It is ranked as the wealthiest neighborhood in Israel.

The neighborhood is subdivided into two areas by Ya'akov Dori Street. South of the street are Tel Aviv Savidor Central Railway Station, Tel Aviv 2000 bus terminal and Volovelsky Park. North of the street is a residential area known as Park Tzameret (Hebrew: פארק צמרת). It consists of eleven luxurious high-rise apartment buildings, with one more under construction as of 2019, surrounded by green space. The 133 dunams (13.3 ha) area has been modeled upon similar projects in London and Paris. Only 18% of the area will contain buildings. Two squares will be built at the southern and northern sides of the neighborhood with a 60-metre-wide (200 ft) avenue linking them. Mature trees and vegetation will be planted along the avenue. In total, 1,747 apartments will be built in the neighborhood with 6,000 square metres (65,000 sq ft) of commercial and public buildings. The east and west boundaries of the area will be delineated by 4.5-metre-high (15 ft) acoustic barriers.

Approved in September 2002, the first project in the neighborhood to be completed was Yoo Tel Aviv.

== History ==
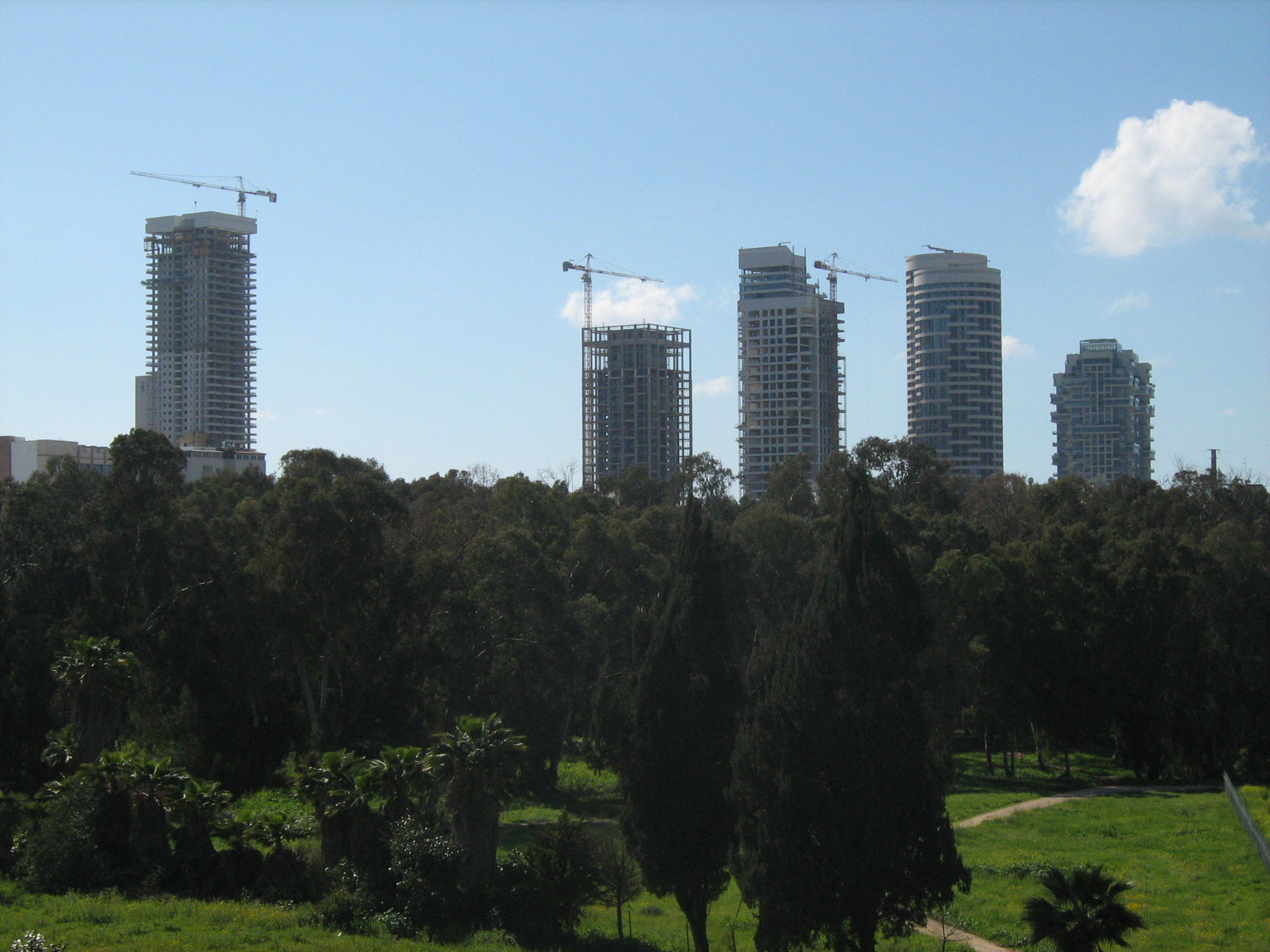
Park Tzameret residential neighborhood under construction

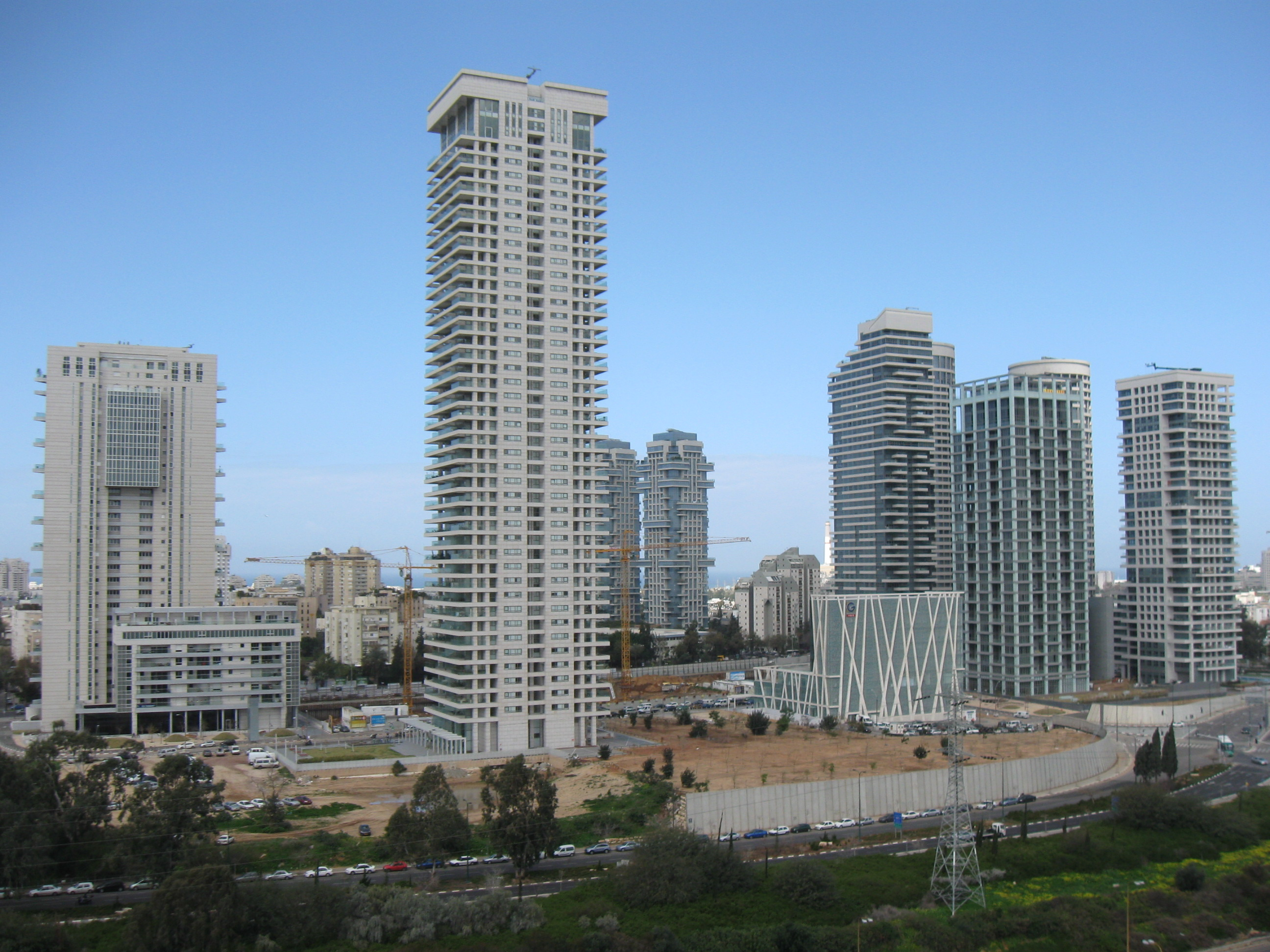
A view of Park Tzameret from the east, March 2011

The area of Park Tzameret was part of a Bedouin village called Jamasin al-Gharbi, which was evacuated during the 1948 Arab–Israeli War. The empty houses were used to shelter Jewish refugees of World War II and of the Jewish exodus from Arab lands. The quarter was integrated into Tel Aviv and called Giv'at Amal Gimel (Amal Hill C). The creation of Park Tzameret was accompanied by a lengthy legal battle and negotiations for the compensation of the Giv'at Amal residents who would be displaced.

== Buildings in Park Tzameret ==
This table shows the towers in Park Tzameret by rank, height and status. Eight buildings are complete, three are under construction and two are approved.

Rank	Building	Height		Floors	Status	Started	Completed
1	Rom Tel Aviv	173.1 m	571 ft	50	Topped out	2016	(2021)
2	W Prime	156 m	511 ft	46	Complete	2012	2015
2	W Tower	156 m	511 ft	46	Complete	2006	2009
4	Yoo Tower 2	142 m	465 ft	41	Complete		2007
5	Manhattan Tower	140 m	459 ft	41	Complete	2005	2009
6	Yoo Tower 1	128 m	420 ft	39	Complete		2007
7	Aviv BaTzameret Tower	108 m	354 ft	32	Complete		2010
8	W Boutique Tower	108 m	354 ft	31	Complete	2010	2013
9	NAM Tower	101 m	331 ft	30	Complete		2010
10	BSR Tzameret Tower 2	108 m	354 ft	30	Complete	2010	2013
11	BSR Tzameret Tower 3	108 m	354 ft	30	Complete	2010	2013
12	One Tower	90 m	295 ft	29	Complete		2008
13	Tzamarot G Center mall			9	Complete	2009	2010

(Italic text indicates provisional or estimated data.)

The information source is Emporis (excluding One Tower).

=== Yoo Tel Aviv ===
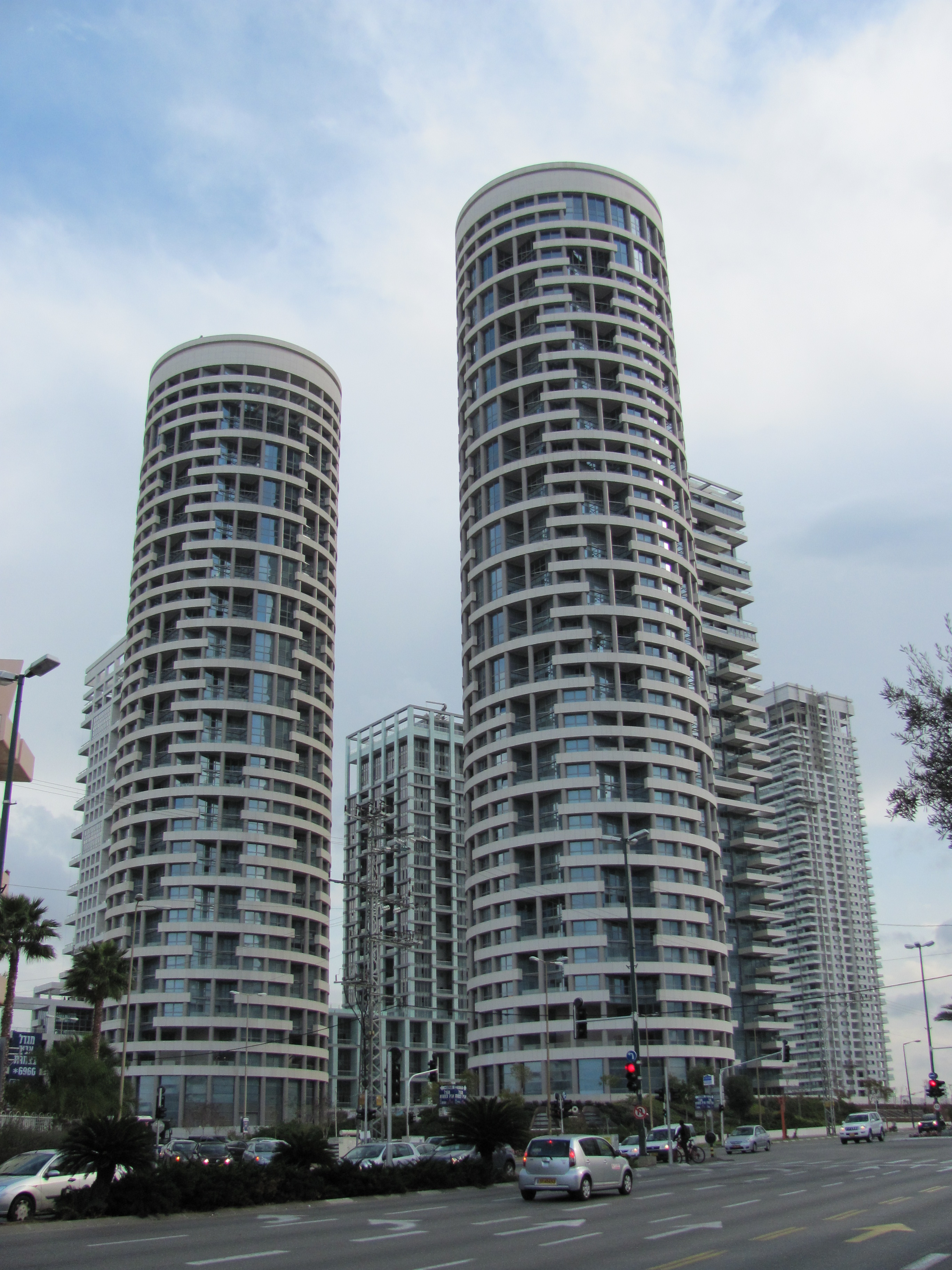
Yoo Towers as seen in 2010

Yoo Tel Aviv is a complex of two skyscrapers completed in 2007. The two towers, named Yoo Tel Aviv 1 and Yoo Tel Aviv 2, became some of Tel Aviv's most recognizable structures, and ranked among Israel's tallest buildings, with Tower 2 being the ninth-tallest building in the country when built, and Tower 1 being the twelfth-tallest. The towers are 142 metres (466 ft) and 128 metres (420 ft) high, respectively, and combined they include over 300 residential units.

Yoo Tel Aviv was designed by Philippe Starck in cooperation with Moore Yaski Sivan Architects and the Habas Group. The total cost of the project is estimated at $145 million. The buildings include a spa, lounge, health club and private cinema, all designed by Starck. Buyers of apartments in the complex had the option of four finishing styles: culture, minimalist, classic and nature.

The complex is constructed on a nine-dunam plot and apartments ranged in price from $4,000–8,000 per square metre. 75% of the apartments in the first stage of the project (Tower 1) were sold for NIS 300 million by 2005, two years before completion. By March 2009, over 90% of the apartments had been sold for an average of $7,000–$7,500 per square metre. Bar Refaeli lives in this tower.

=== Manhattan Tower ===
Manhattan Tower includes 180 luxury apartments with a large private spa complex. 150 apartments were sold off-plan in just three weeks, and prices were reported to be half of those in the adjacent Yoo Towers. Upon its completion, the tower was the largest and tallest tower built solely by a private buyers' group in Israel. The architects for the tower are Moore Yaski Sivan Architects.

=== W Tower and W Boutique Tower ===
W Tower was built by the Canada Israel Group and designed by Yashar Architects. With 156.4 metres (513 ft) in height (46 floors), it was the tallest all-residential tower in Israel upon its completion. The W Boutique Tower, also by the Canada Israel Group, was designed by Barely Levitzky Kassif Architects. It was completed in 2013 and includes 31 floors.

Homeowners in the W Tower include former Mossad chief Meir Dagan, former generals Moshe Kaplinsky, Menachem Einan and the famous top model Bar Refaeli.

=== NAM Tower ===
The NAM Tower (32.0900°N 34.7964°E) is 30 stories tall and has a height of 101 metres (331 ft). The tower was built by Danya Cebus. Construction began in 2006, and was completed in 2010. Investors included the Namvar family. The building was designed in the modernist architectural style, with a white facade. It has lights on four sides.

== See also ==
- Neighborhoods of Tel Aviv
- List of tallest buildings in Israel
