= Marganit Tower =

- מגדל מרגנית
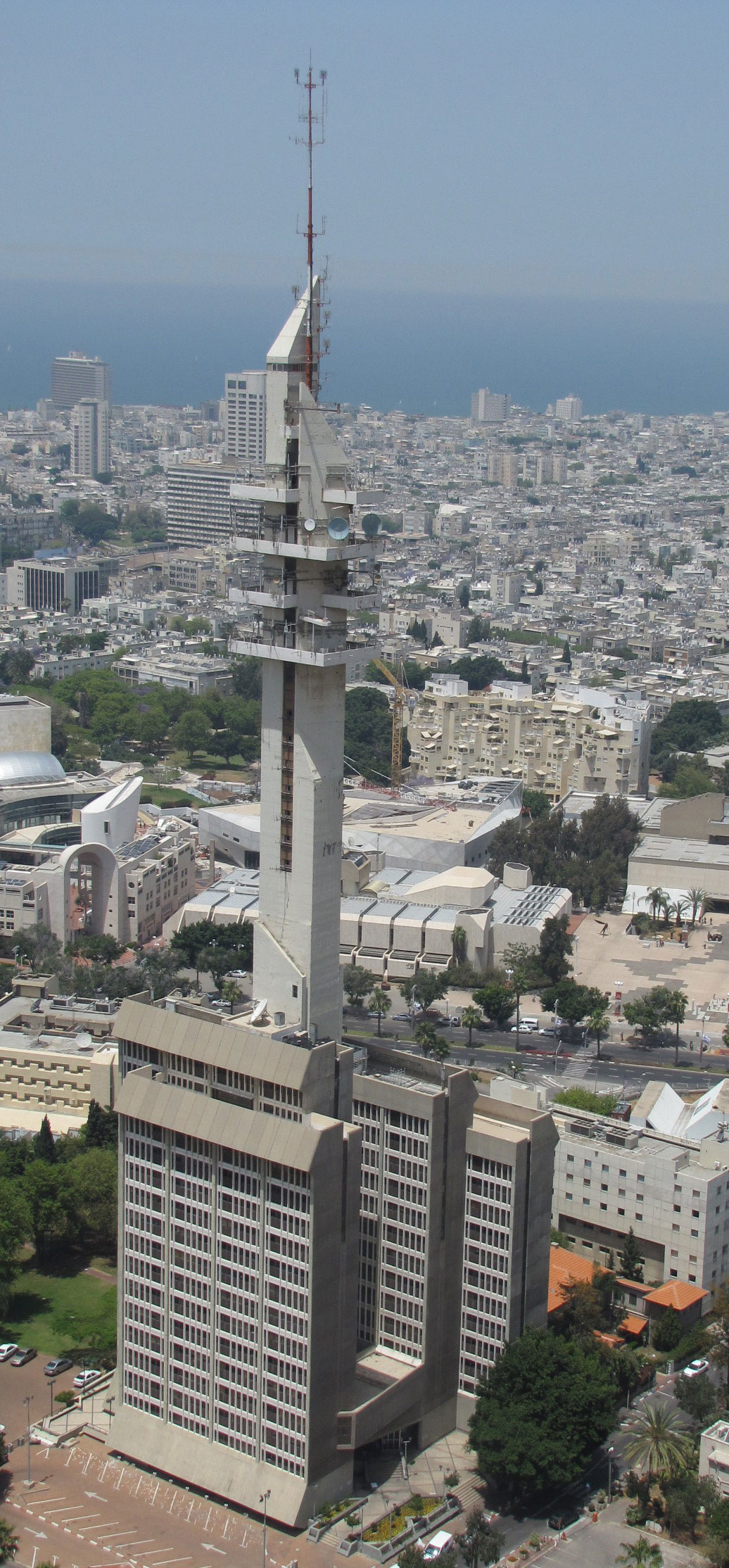
- Marganit Tower, 2010
- Interactive map of the Marganit Tower area

General information
- Status: Completed
- Type: Offices
- Location: HaKirya, Tel Aviv, Israel
- Coordinates: 32°4′31″N 34°47′18″E
- Opening: 1987

Height
- Antenna spire: 138 m (453 ft)

Technical details
- Floor count: 17

Design and construction
- Architect: ASSA Architects

The Marganit Tower is a skyscraper located in HaKirya, Tel Aviv, Israel. Completed in 1987, the building is 138 metres (453 ft) in height, although most of this is due to its "finger", a concrete mast with antennas and other transmission equipment. As such, it only has 17 floors. Upon completion it was the country's tallest building. It was designed by ASSA Architects.

The tower has a 28 centimetres (11 in) slant, a fact that was discovered on April 5, 1989 during construction. Construction work continued after inspection and approval by the tower's engineers.

== See also ==
- List of tallest buildings in Israel
- Architecture of Israel

Records
Preceded by Shalom Meir Tower	Tallest building in Israel; 1987–1999; 138 metres (453 ft)	Succeeded by Azrieli Center Circular Tower
