= Asher Anshel Daskal =

Israeli businessman (1908–1990)

- Born: April 18, 1908; Maramures, Romania
- Died: July 6, 1990 (aged 82); Savyon, Israel
- Burial place: Savyon, Israel
- Occupations: Diamantaire & Diamond dealer
- Years active: 1937–1988

Asher Anshel Daskal (Hebrew: אשר אנשל דסקל; April 18, 1908 – July 6, 1990) was a founder and a pioneer of the Israeli diamond industry. Daskal founded the first diamond plant in the land of Israel in Petah Tikva with his cousin Zvi Rosenberg.

== Biography ==
=== Early life ===
Asher Anshel Daskal was born in Moisei, a small village in the Maramureș county in north Romania. Daskal was born to an Orthodox Jewish family from the Wiznitz Hasidic community. He studied in a Yeshiva and helped at home with the live stock. In 1927 at the age of 19, Anshel didn't see a future for himself as a shepherd or as a Hasidic scholar and decided to relocate to Antwerp Belgium.

In Belgium, with the help and support of his relatives he started to work as an apprentice for a diamond cutter and later on he learned how to polish and how to cleave. The first few months were tough. He lived from hand to mouth, but soon enough he was seen to be a gifted cutter and consequently quickly climbed up the diamond cutter social ladder making a name for himself amongst the Antwerp diamond community.

=== The Zionist Dream ===
Anshel was a Zionist. His dream was that of immigrating to the Land of Israel. In 1932 after saving enough money, he bought a ticket and sailed to British Mandate Palestine as a tourist, to visit the first Maccabiah Games (the Jewish Olympics). In addition, Daskal went on a tour to explore the country. It was the Holy Land visit that spiked his idea to found and establish a diamond Industry in the Land of Israel. In 1934, he shared this idea with his cousin Zvi Rosenberg but Zvi was already preparing for his own immigration journey to the land of Israel, alongside his wife and three children and didn’t want to wait for Anshel.

In 1935, Daskal returned as a tourist to the Land of Israel. He bought a piece of land near the town of Qalqilya that had been designated to be agricultural land. When he returned in 1936, he was told that the county plans for that community had not been approved. Disappointed by the sad turn of events, he sold his land and returned to Antwerp. In Antwerp, Daskal joined a cooperative that intended to found an Israeli diamond industry in the Holy Land, but as he didn't approve of their business plans and quit. The cooperative disbanded shortly afterward.

Daskal purchased diamond manufacturing equipment, learned how to operate and maintain them all, in order to found his very own Diamond Plant in the Land of Israel.

=== Immigration to Israel ===
In 1937 Daskal finalized all immigration procedures for himself and family. He boarded the ship with his wife Miriam, his Baby girl and his diamond manufacturing equipment with final destination Land of Israel.

Upon arriving to his cousin's house, Zvi Rosenberg in Petah Tikva, together they founded the first diamond plant in the country. Most of Daskal and Rosenberg's students/apprentices and employees became leading figures in the Diamond industry. In 1939 The cousins were offered by Oved Ben-Ami Netanya city mayor, to relocate to his town and establish new diamond plants. They were getting ready to open their first factory Ofir but last minute Anshel backed up from their partnership and later that year he founded Even Hayesod plant in Netanya. At the peak of this plant he had 200 employees. After World War II ended there was a big crisis in the diamond industry and in 1946 Daskal closed his plant. 1948 and the following years he founded plants in Bnei Brak, Jerusalem Kiriat Malachi and Ashkelon.

== The first diamond ==
Daskal cut and polished the first diamond at the first diamond plant in Israel in Petah Tikva. He kept that very first diamond in his vault for nearly 50 years. In 1986 Harry Oppenheimer Diamond Museum was opened at the Israel Diamond Exchange center. Anshel lent that very first diamond to the museum for a display. The first diamond was on display for a few years and was known as being "Daskal's diamond". With the museum closing the diamond was returned to Anshel's family in 2021.

== Awards and recognition ==
In 1988 Asher Anshel Daskal received the Dignitary award from the Israel Diamond Manufacturers' Association in their first award ceremony and was invited to the second one in 1989. In 1989 Daskal received the founders awards from the Israel Diamond Exchange. The award was presented to him by Moshe Schnitzer the Israel Diamond Exchange President (1967-1993).

On July 6, 1990, Asher Anshel Daskal died, at the age of 82.

In 2020 to commemorate Anshel’s legacy a TV script for a limited series was written based on his life by his grand daughter Nurit Asher Vagner and her son Itai Adam Vagner. The script is currently in development and in review at US and EU production companies. The script won several finalist awards in US scripts competition. In late 2020 producer Nicole Starrett from Jubilee production (Los Angeles) came on board to help develop the project

June 30th 2022 was a commemoration ceremony for Daskal at the Israeli Diamond Exchange center where they dedicated the weigh room in the main trade hall to his name.
