= List of tallest buildings in Ramat Gan =

This list of the tallest buildings in Ramat Gan ranks buildings in Ramat Gan, Israel by their height. The buildings on the list are 100 m (330 ft) or higher.

Ramat Gan is a city in the Tel Aviv Metropolitan Area that houses the Diamond Exchange District, one of Israel's largest business areas in terms of floor space. Between 2001 and 2016 it housed Israel's tallest building, Moshe Aviv Tower, at 235 m, surpassed by Tel Aviv's Azrieli Sarona Tower, at 238 m. A secondary entrance of Moshe Aviv Tower lies below the main entrance, making the tower 244 m tall by another metric, still the tallest in Israel as of 2021.

Ramat Gan is also the site of the tallest building in Israel approved for construction – Tower 120, so named after the number of floors it is slated to have – as well as Vertical Tower 1, the second-tallest, at over 400 meters.

== List ==
Rank	Name	Image	Location	Built	Use	Height (tip)	Floors (above ground)	Source
1	Moshe Aviv Tower (City Gate)		Diamond Exchange District	2001	Office, Residential	235 m (771 ft)	68	
4	Sapir Tower		Diamond Exchange District	2019	Office	163.6 m (537 ft)	42	
2	Exchange Residential Tower		HaRishonim	2026	Residential	206 m (676 ft)	61	
3	Exchange Office Tower		HaRishonim	2026	Office	198 m (650 ft)	50	
5=	Amot Atrium Tower		HaRishonim	2015	Office	158 m (518 ft)	40	
5=	One Tower		Diamond Exchange District	2022	Office	158 m (518 ft)	38	
7	Leonardo City Tower		Diamond Exchange District	2000	Hotel, Residential	157 m (515 ft)	41	
8	Gibor Sport House		Diamond Exchange District	2000	Office	152.5 m (500 ft)	37	
9	Menora Mivtahim Tower		Diamond Exchange District	2017	Office	146 m (479 ft)	35	
10	Pisgat Dan		Gefen Neighborhood	2020	Residential	140 m (460 ft)	42	
11	Time Tower		HaRishonim	2017	Office and Residential	135 m (443 ft)	38	
12	Marom Negba 1		Negba Neighborhood	2017	Residential	132 m (433 ft)	32	
13	Ayalon Tower		Diamond Exchange District	2008	Office	130 m (430 ft)	35	
14	Savyon Mofet Tower		Yahalom Neighborhood	2017	Residential	123 m (404 ft)	31	
15=	Al HaPark Tower		Ramat Shikma	2015	Residential	120 m (390 ft)	34	
15=	Maslawi Elite Tower		HaRishonim	2017	Residential	120 m (390 ft)	32	
17	Savyon Tower		Ben Gurion Neighborhood	2007	Residential	119 m (390 ft)	34	
18	Diamond Tower		Diamond Exchange District	1992	Office	115 m (377 ft)	34	
19	Crystal House		Diamond Exchange District	1992	Office	112 m (367 ft)	26	
20=	Gefen Tower 1		Gefen Neighborhood	2013	Residential	110 m (360 ft)	32	
20=	City Park Tower		Nahalat Ganim	2007	Residential	110 m (360 ft)	31	
20=	Faire Tower		Nahalat Ganim	2012	Residential	110 m (360 ft)	31	
20=	HaMatmid (Highline) Tower 1		HaRishonim	2020	Residential	110 m (360 ft)	30	
24	Ordea Tower		Hashmona'im	2013	Residential	106 m (348 ft)	30	
25=	14 Ahad HaAm		Ramat Shikma	2015	Residential	104 m (341 ft)	31	
25=	Gindi Heights 1		Diamond Exchange District	2010	Residential	104 m (341 ft)	30	
25=	Gindi Heights 2		Diamond Exchange District	2010	Residential	104 m (341 ft)	30	
28	Rama Tower		Gefen Neighborhood	2015	Residential	103 m (338 ft)	28	
29	56 Neve Yehoshua		Neve Yehoshua	2012	Residential	101 m (331 ft)	30	

== See also ==
- List of tallest buildings in Israel
- List of tallest buildings in Tel Aviv
