= Harry Oppenheimer Diamond Museum =

Former gem museum in Tel Aviv, Israel

Coordinates: 32.082848°N 34.800805°E

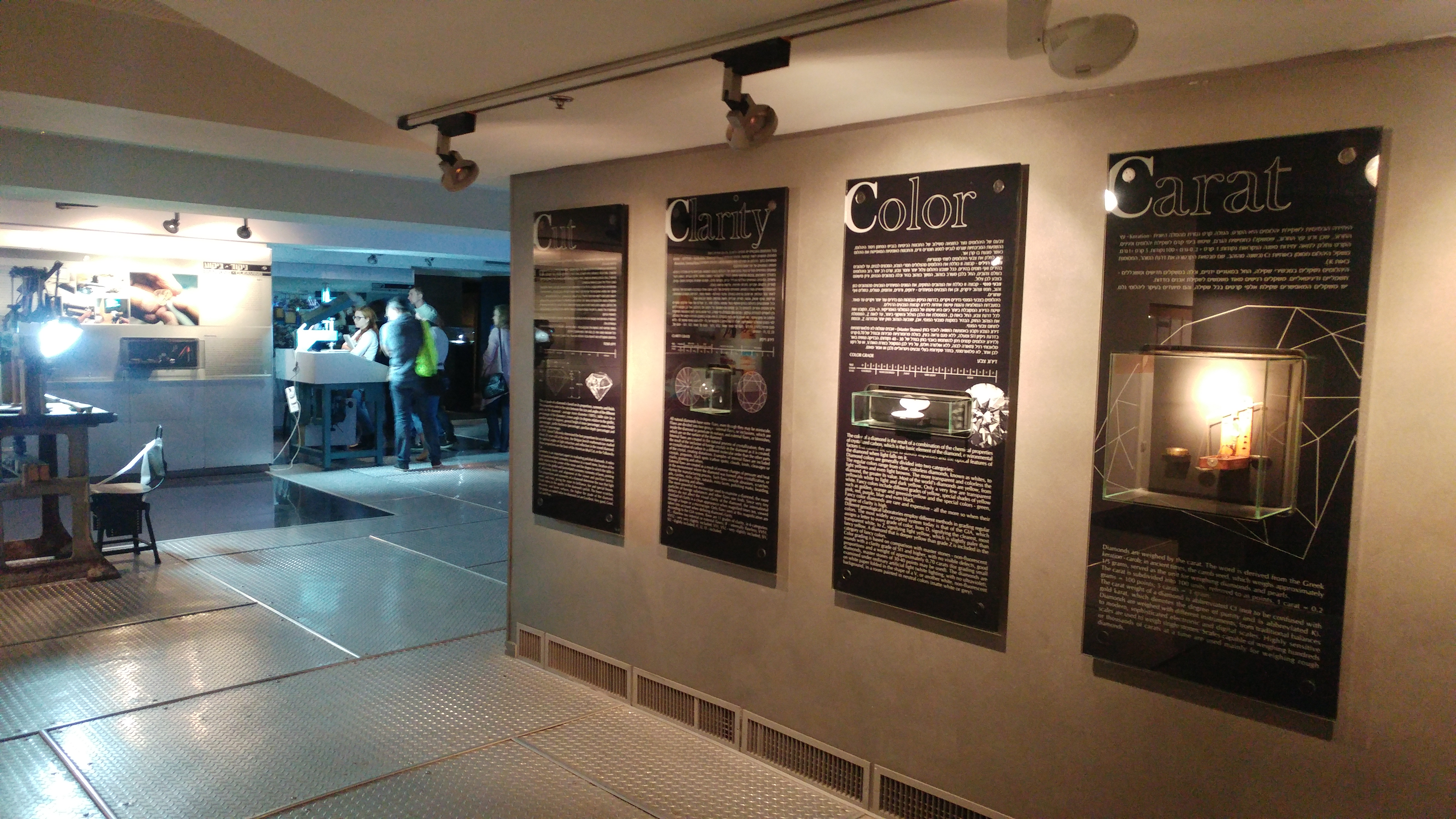
- Established: 1986
- Location: Ramat Gan, Tel Aviv District, Israel
- Website: diamond-museum.co.il

Harry Oppenheimer Diamond Museum was a museum located in the Diamond Exchange District, Tel Aviv District city of Ramat Gan, Israel.

== History ==
The permanent collection consisted of rough and finished diamonds and gemstones and provided information on the history and industry of diamonds. The museum was founded in 1986 in honor of Harry Oppenheimer. Moshe Schnitzer was responsible for establishing the museum and was its chairman until July 2003. In 2008, the museum was reopened after major renovations. It was closed in 2018.

The museum was operated by the Israel Diamond Institute. Shmuel Schnitzer served as museum chairman.

The museum hosted diamond, jewellery, gemstone art, and jewelled fashion accessory exhibits from around the world.

== Notable exhibits ==
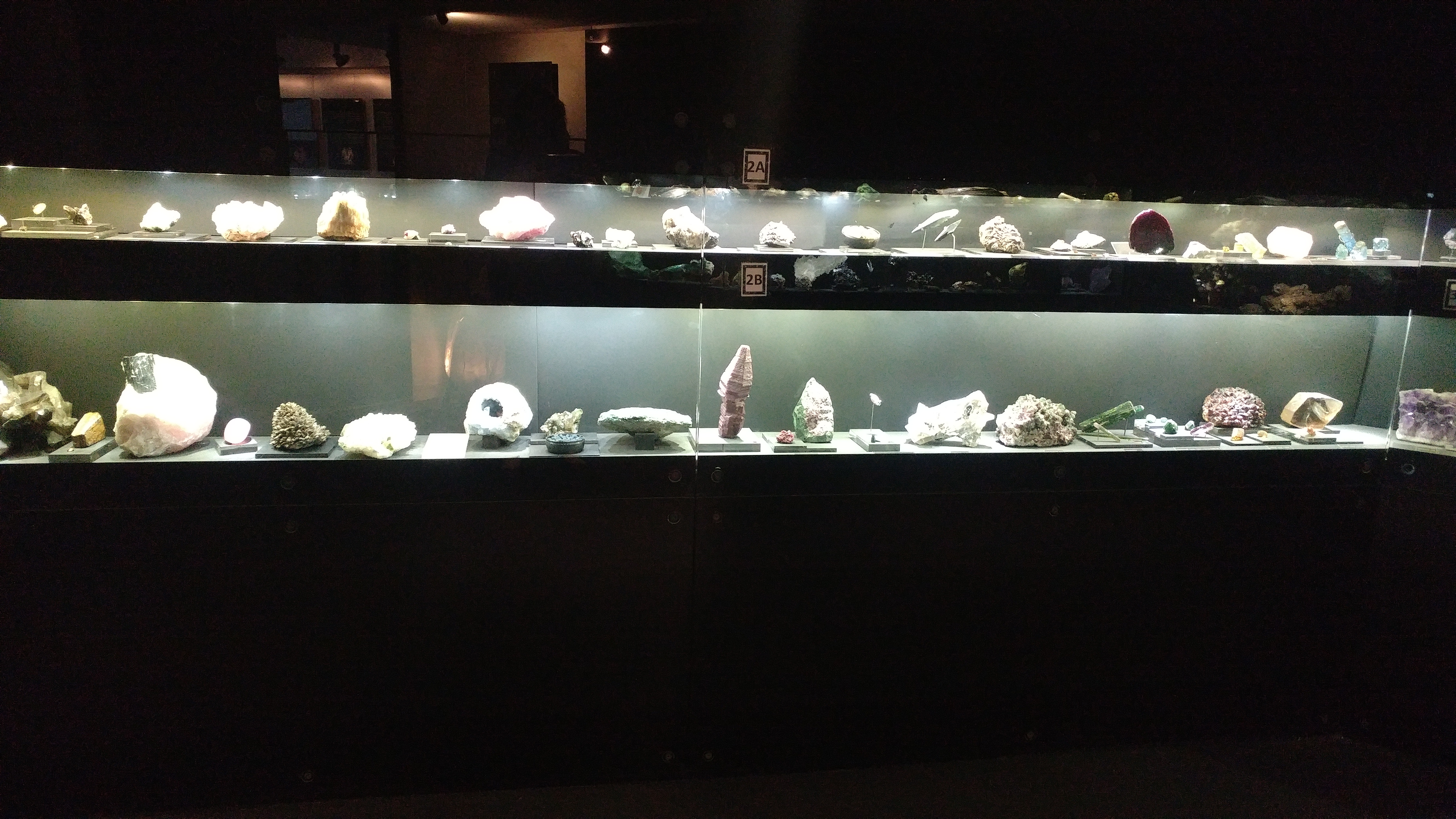
Gemstone and mineral display

- From The Golden Treasury of Prague – a collection of 180 diamond jewels from the museum of applied arts in Prague and 18 examples of Jewish ceremonial silver from the Jewish Museum in Prague (1994)
- Silver Images of Golden Apples, a collection of jewellery discovered at archeological sites throughout Israel, covering periods from the patriarchs, around 3000 BCE, through the Ottoman period. The exhibit was co-sponsored by the Israel Antiquities Authority and the Hecht Museum.
- 60 Diamonds and one more consisting of pieces set by Israeli designers in a national competition.
- AND THOU SHALT BREATHE LIFE INTO A GEM, a 2009 exhibit of 140 works by gemstone carvers of Idar-Oberstein, Germany, including gemstones fashioned in the shape of animals and flowers, and vessels.
- The Diamonds Roar, and All About Diamonds, exhibits of jewellery by emerging designers from South Africa.
- Indian Legend: Diamond Jewelry from Jaipur, an exhibit of jeweled accessories of the Maharajas of Jaipur, India.

== See also ==
- List of Israeli museums
