= Sapphire Tower Ramat Gan =

Skyscrpaer in Ramat Gan, Israel

Sapphire Tower
- מגדל ספיר (Hebrew)
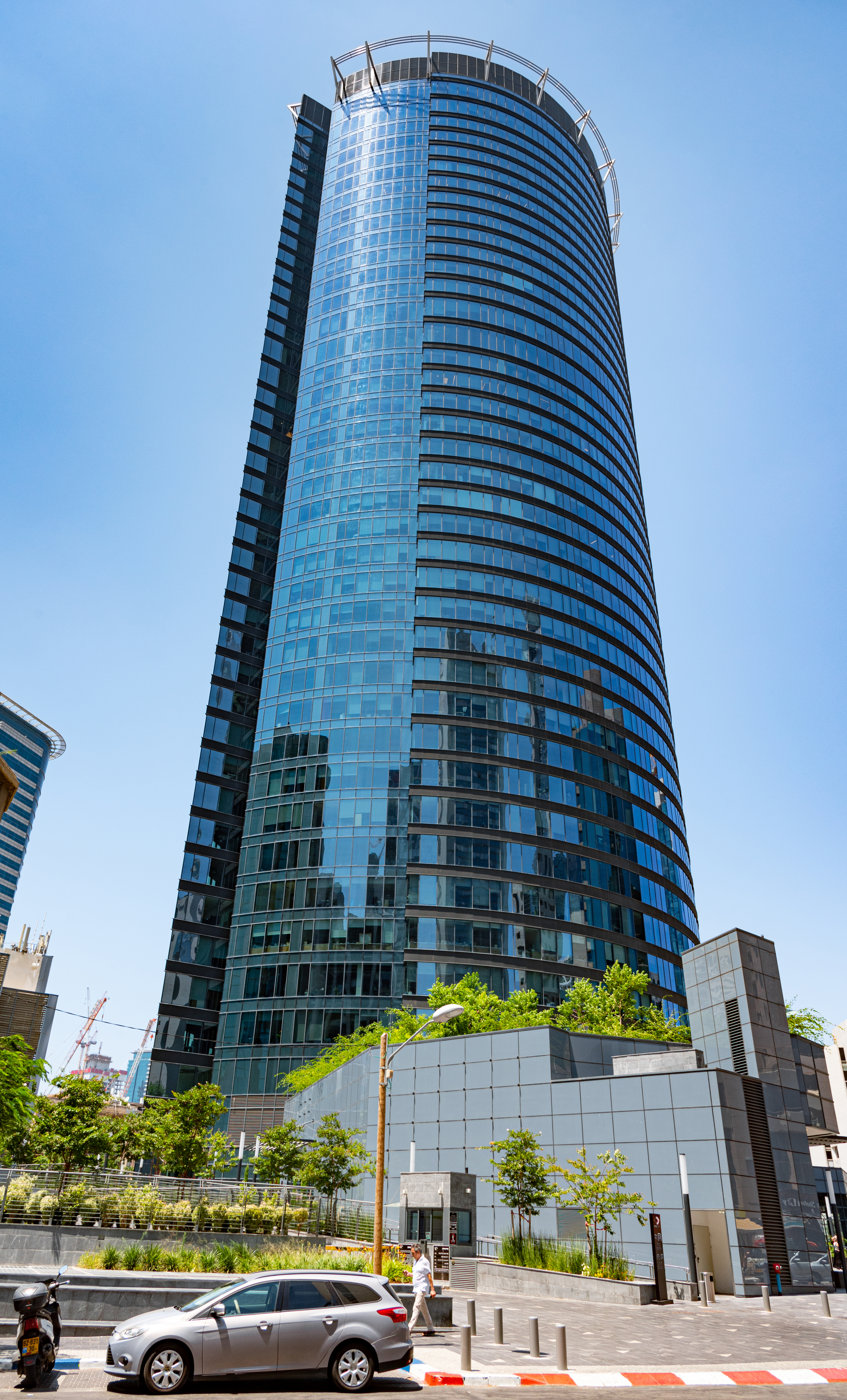

General information
- Status: Completed
- Type: Office
- Location: Ramat Gan, Tel Aviv District, Israel, 40 Tuval St., Ramat Gan, Israel
- Coordinates: 32.08511°N 34.80191°E
- Construction started: 2015
- Completed: 2019

Height
- Roof: 163.6 m (537 ft)

Technical details
- Structural system: Concrete
- Floor count: 42 (+5 underground)
- Floor area: 60,000 m^{2} (646,000 sq ft)

Design and construction
- Architects: Miloslavsky Architects; B. Peleg Architects

The Sapphire Tower (Hebrew: מגדל ספיר) (popularly known as the Sapir Tower) is an office skyscraper in the Diamond Exchange District ,Tel Aviv District city of Ramat Gan, Israel. Built between 2015 and 2019, the tower stands at 163.6 m (537 ft) tall with 42 floors and is the current 22nd tallest building in Israel.

== History ==
The building is located in the triangle of Tuval, Haytsira and Harkon streets in the Diamond Exchange District in Ramat Gan. The building includes 42 floors - a high ground floor, a gallery floor, 38 office floors and 2 technical floors and rises to a height of 163.63 meters. And upon its completion in 2018, it was the second tallest in the stock exchange complex.

The land on which the tower was built was used for many years as a parking lot and garage complex. The land was purchased in 2001 by the companies Tidhar and Rogovin as part of a combination deal signed with about 20 diamond merchants who owned the plots of land. The Aviv company later joined the deal. The developers planned to begin construction in 2011, although the city building plan that applies to the area allows for the construction of 43,000 square meters of offices above ground on 27 floors, they approached the Ramat Gan Municipality with a request to change the plan and approve the construction of 60,000 square meters of offices on 40 floors. And in 2012, a plan was approved for a 50-story tower, 201 meters high.

Construction of the building began in 2015, but it was decided to build only 27 floors in the first phase. During construction, it was decided to build 40 floors.

In the summer of 2018, the tower reached its maximum height and was completed at the end of that year.

=== Architecture ===
The tower was designed by Amav Architects and Peleg Architects, and was built on a 7-dunam plot. The total built-up area of the tower is 60,000 square meters, intended for offices and commerce, and includes five basement floors, for a parking lot about 30 meters deep, including about 800 parking spaces. The building's branding under the name Sapir derives from the shape of the building's covering, which resembles a sapphire stone.

The tower has eight high-speed elevators, a service elevator, an entrance lobby, and a trading floor with an area of approximately 1,571 square meters. The middle floors of the tower (18–27) function as a separate wing for diamond dealers, with separate elevators, a gallery floor, and an inspection lobby as part of the Diamond Exchange complex.

== Gallery ==
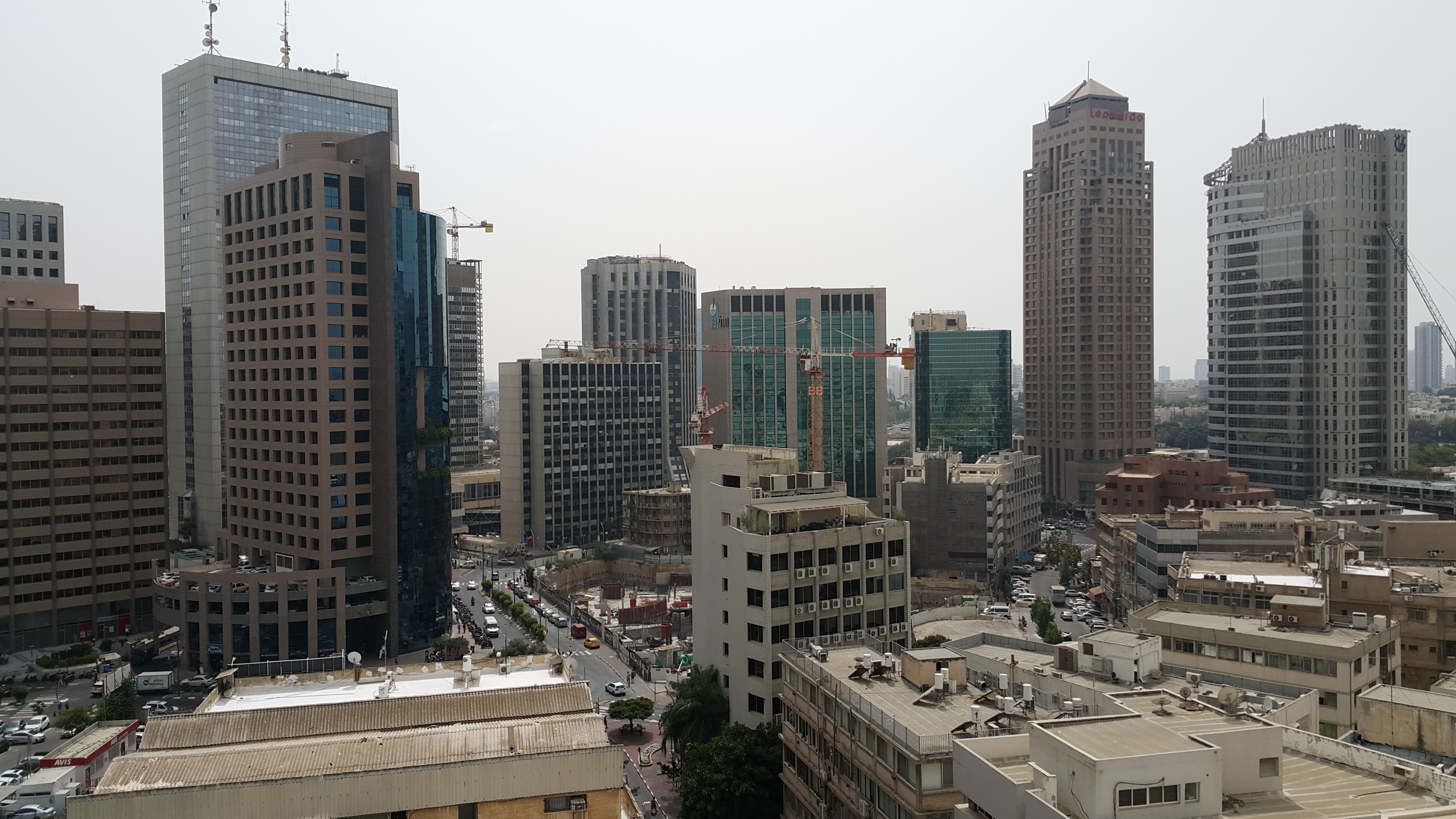
The tower at the beginning of its construction, September 2015

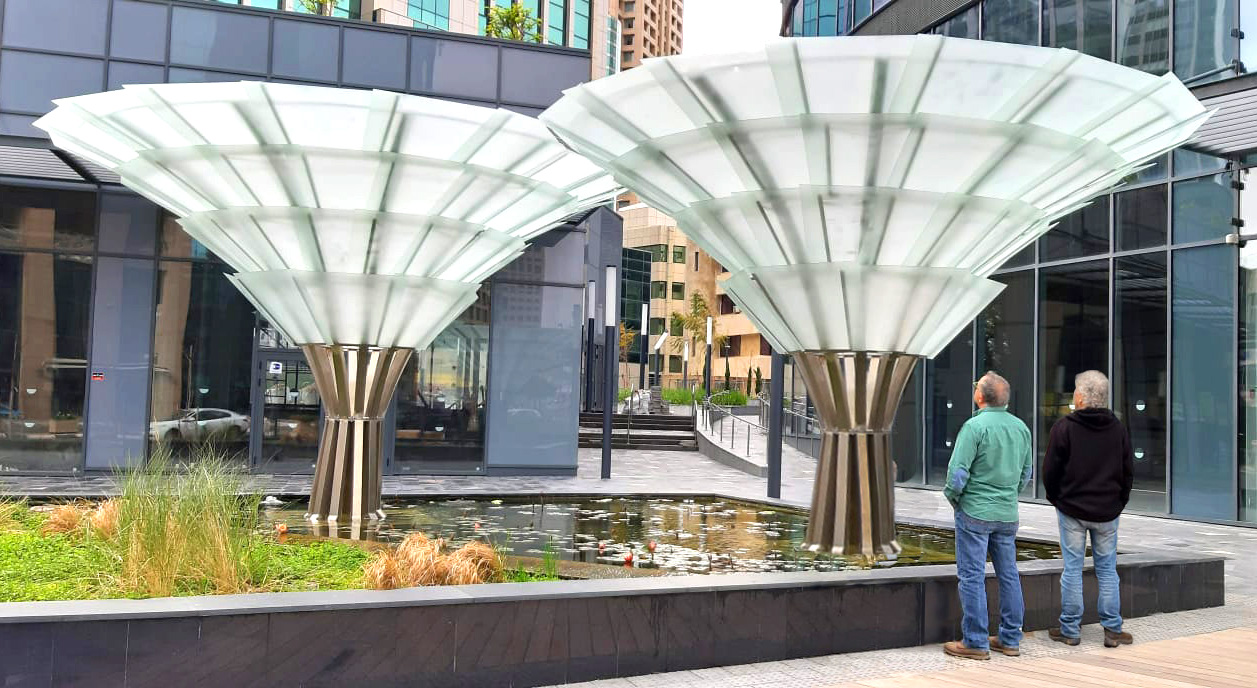
Ilan Ilan, a Stainless steel and glass located at the Ilan Gal-on Plaza at the base of the tower

== See also ==
- List of tallest buildings in Israel
- List of tallest buildings in Ramat Gan
