= Amot Atrium Tower =

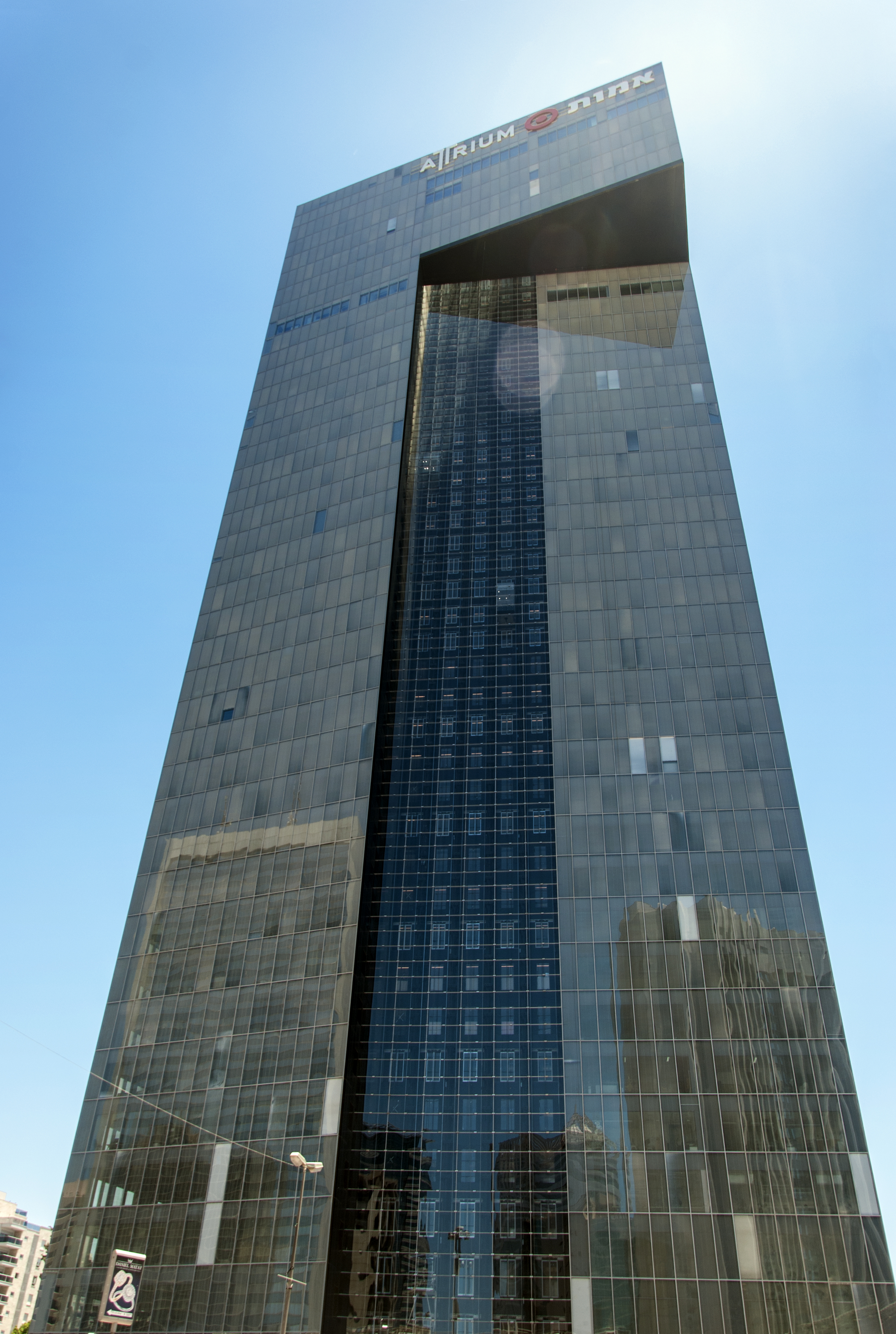
- Interactive map of the Amot Atrium Tower area

General information
- Type: Office
- Location: Ramat Gan, Tel Aviv District, Israel
- Coordinates: 32°04′57″N 34°48′05″E
- Completed: 2015

Height
- Roof: 158 m (518 ft)

Technical details
- Floor count: 40

Design and construction
- Architect: Moshe Tzur Architects

The Amot Atrium Tower (Hebrew: מגדל אמות אטריום) is an office skyscraper on Jabotinsky Street near the Diamond Exchange District in the Tel Aviv District city of Ramat Gan, Israel. It is a 40 story tower and 158 meters tall. The tower’s construction was completed at the end of 2015.

== Characteristics and history ==
The tower was designed by Moshe Tzur Architects. Despite the height of the tower, it is only 40 floors, so that every floor is higher than usual, approximately 3.8 meters. The total floor area is 74,000 square meters and includes 8 underground parking lot floors 30 meters deep.

Until 2007 and before the tower was built, the site was owned by the Tara cooperative and their historic structure of the dairy. That year Amot Investments purchased the lot. In the beginning of 2015 the tower reached its maximum height and at the end of the year its construction was completed.

Amot Atrium Tower is certified LEED Platinum, the first Israeli skyscraper to get this distinction. Part of its facade is the tallest curtain wall system in the world.

== See also ==
- List of tallest buildings in Israel
- List of tallest buildings in Ramat Gan
