= Shmuel Schnitzer =

Israeli diamond trader

- שמואל שניצר
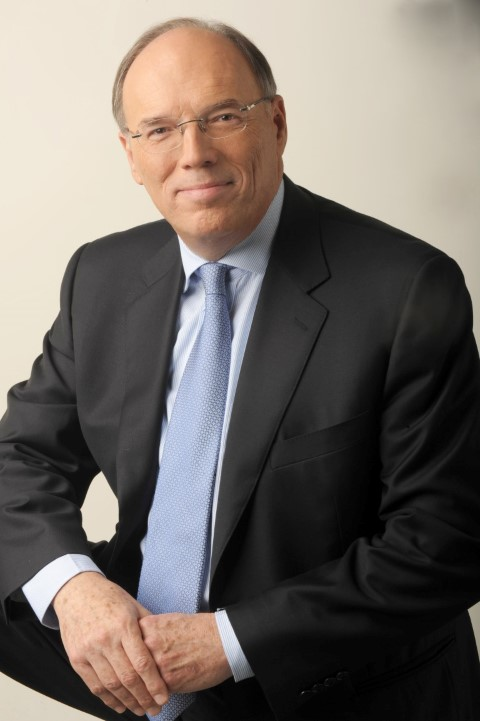
- Shmuel Schnitzer (Diamantaire)
- Born: 1949 (age 76–77)
- Occupation: Diamond trader
- Known for: President of the Israel Diamond Exchange; Chairman of S. Schnitzer Diamonds Ltd.
- Family: Moshe Schnitzer (father)
- Website: sschnitzer.com

Shmuel Schnitzer, Atty. (Hebrew: שמואל שניצר; born in 1949) is an Israeli diamond trader and chairman of S. Schnitzer Diamonds Ltd. Schnitzer served as president of the Israel Diamond Exchange (IDE) from 1998 to 2004 and from 2013 to 2015, and after serving in this position, he was awarded the title of Lifelong Honorary President of the Israel Diamond Exchange. Shmuel Schnitzer was president of the World Federation of Diamond Bourses (WFDB) from 2002 to 2006, and after his resignation, he was awarded the title of Honorary Life President of the WFDB. In addition, Shmuel Schnitzer holds a Lifetime Achievement Award from the New York Diamond Dealers Club (DDC) and is honorary president of the Israel Precious Stones & Diamonds Exchange.

== Biography ==
Schnitzer was born in Israel to Varda and Moshe Schnitzer. He is married to Sharona and they have three children, Shai, Shani and Ben. Shmuel Schnitzer studied law from 1972 to 1976 at the Hebrew University of Jerusalem, and was then licensed as an attorney. In 1975, he became a member of the Israel Diamond Exchange. In 1988, he entered public service as a member of the Executive Committee of the Israel Diamond Manufacturers Association, fulfilling numerous positions: chair of the Justice Committee, chair of the Finance Committee, chair of the Younger Generation Committee and others.

In 1998, Schnitzer was elected president of the Israel Diamond Exchange. He served in this position for three consecutive terms, until 2004. In October 2013, he was elected once again to the office of president of the Israel Diamond Exchange, in which he served until 2015. Upon retiring, he was awarded the title of Lifelong Honorary President of the Exchange, in addition to his position as Honorary President of the Israel Precious Stones & Diamonds Exchange.

Schnitzer serves as a member of the presidium of the Diamond Manufacturers Association, chairman of its Justice Committee and a member of the Advisory Committee of the Shanghai Diamond Exchange, a position he has held since the founding of the exchange.

In January 2016, he was elected chair of the board of the directors of the Israel Diamond Institute, and served this office until 2018.

Schnitzer was awarded the Lifetime Achievement Award of the New York Diamond Dealers Club (DDC). During the 32nd World Diamond Congress, which was held in Israel, the diamond industry awarded him the Israel Diamond Dignitary Award.

== Social Activity ==
Shmuel Schnitzer is a member of the Moshe Schnitzer Foundation for Research on the Israeli Economy and Society at Bar-Ilan University. The foundation funds academic research activity regarding the Israeli market, economy and society, promoting excellence in research in these areas. Schnitzer is also a member of the board of trustees of the Tel Aviv University and the Association of Friends of the Tel Aviv Medical Center.

Schnitzer was president and chairman of the Beitar Tel Aviv Bat Yam F.C. football team from 2007 to 2012. This was a peak period for the team; in 2008, it reached the national semi-finals, despite its position as a third-tier club. From 2009 to 2013, he was a member of the executive and the secretariat of the Football Association. Schnitzer currently serves as a member of the Central Board of Beitar.

Schnitzer has been vice-president of the Israel–Japan Chamber of Commerce since 2012.

== See also ==
- Diamond industry in Israel
