= Oved Ben-Ami =

Israeli politician and businessman

- עוֹבֵד בֶּן־עַמִּי
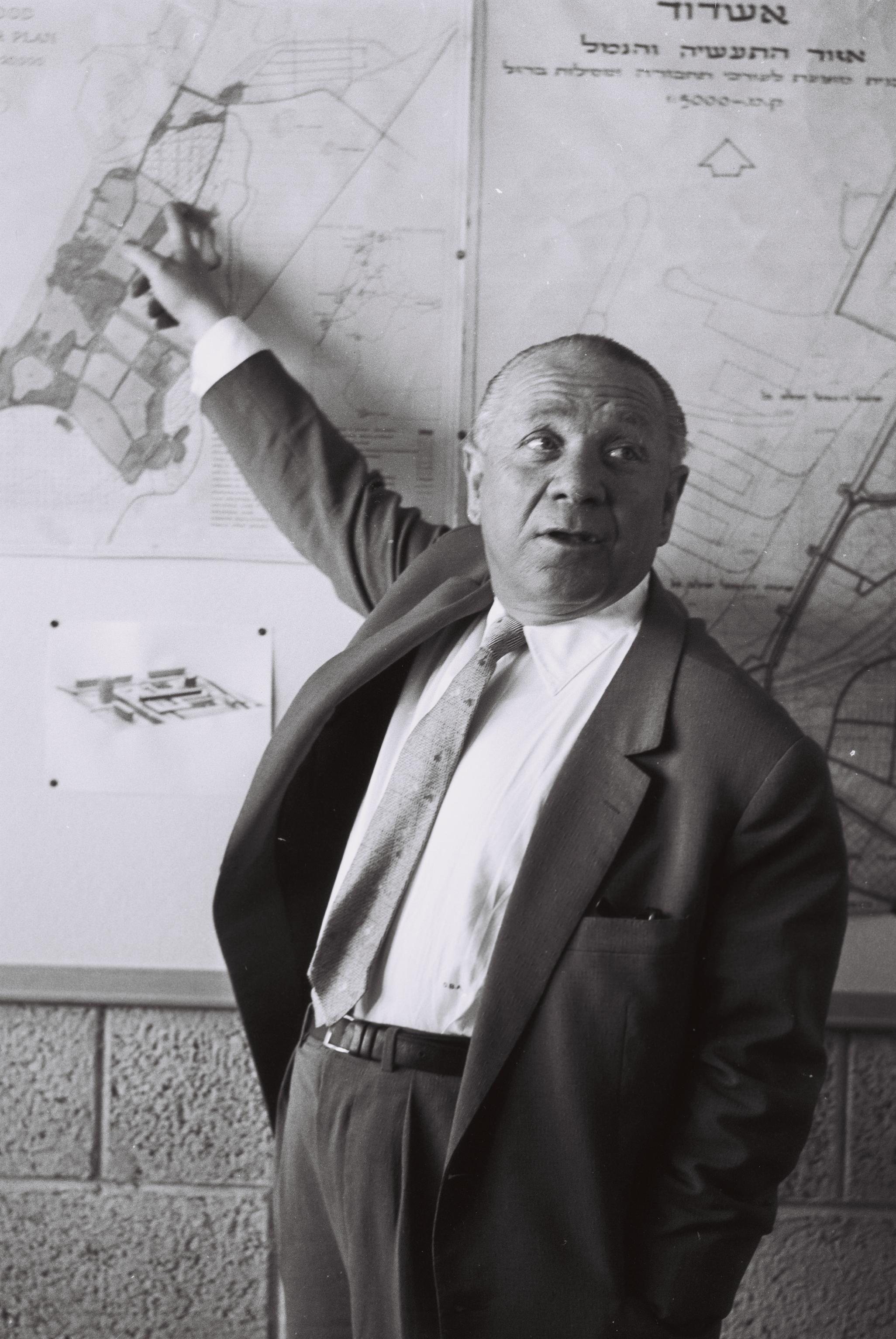
- Ben-Ami in 1960
- Born: Oved Dankner; July 23, 1905; Petah Tikva, Ottoman Palestine
- Died: October 17, 1988 (aged 83)
- Organization: World Zionist Organization

Oved Ben-Ami (Hebrew: עוֹבֵד בֶּן־עַמִּי; July 23, 1905 – October 17, 1988) was an Israeli politician and businessman. He was one of the founders of the cities of Netanya and Ashdod and was a longtime mayor of Netanya. He was also among the key founders of the Israeli diamond industry and the Maariv newspaper.

== Early life ==
Oved Ben-Ami, originally Oved Dankner, was born in Petah Tikva, in what was then Ottoman-ruled Palestine, in 1905 to Meir and Shoshana Dankner. He had eight siblings. His father was a farmer and artisan originally from Romania who was among the first inhabitants of Petah Tikva. His mother was an activist in the Bilu movement. Ben-Ami grew up in Petah Tikva where he received a religious education in a Talmud Torah in addition to a secular education. He was active in various Zionist youth organizations.

== Career ==
In 1920, at the age of only 15, Ben-Ami became a correspondent for the Do'ar HaYom and Palestine Weekly newspapers. Two years later, he entered the board of Doar HaYom and at that time changed his name from Dankner to Ben-Ami. He covered the 1921 Jaffa riots, sending daily reports to Jerusalem on the rioting in Jaffa and Petah Tikva. He later switched from being a correspondent to writing analytical material on the development of Jewish settlements in Palestine. In 1922, he was the editor of two more periodicals.

Ben-Ami was a member of the Bnei Binyamin Association, an organization active in Jewish settlement in Palestine. He became its regional secretary in Petah Tikva in 1922, and served as general secretary from 1924 to 1928, during which time it was active in the building of Kfar Aharon (now part of Ness Ziona) and Herzliya. Together with Itamar Ben-Avi, Ben-Ami traveled abroad to collect donations to fund Jewish settlement. They went to the United States in 1928 to raise funds for the project of building Netanya and purchased the land on which the city was founded by Bnei Binyamin. Settlement of Netanya began in 1929. Ben-Ami headed the Netanya settlement council from 1929 to 1940, and officially became mayor after Netanya was granted local council status by the British Mandate authorities in 1940. He served as mayor from 1940 to 1974, though not continuously.

In 1929, Ben-Ami was elected chairman of the central committee of Bnei Binyamin. He was a member of the Palestinian delegations to the Sixteenth and Seventeenth World Zionist Congresses. He participated in the creation of the Jewish Agency and became a member of the Executive Committee of the World Zionist Organization. He was also one of the founders of the Hanotea company, which was established to raise money and acquire land for Jewish settlement. He also participated in the founding of the town of Even Yehuda in 1932. In 1937, he was a member of the delegation of Palestinian farmers to the Twentieth World Zionist Congress.

Ben-Ami was one of the early founders of the Israeli diamond industry. In 1938, he invited the first two local diamond manufacturers, Asher Anshel Daskal and Zvi Rosenberg, who ran a diamond polishing business from Rosenberg's home in Petah Tikva, to open a Diamond plant in Netanya, and after the proper funds were raised, the Ophir diamond polishing plant opened in 1939 owned by Rosenberg and partners. It was the first diamond polishing factory in Palestine on that scale. Shortly after Even Hayesod was opened owned by Daskal and partners. During World War II, Ben-Ami traveled to London and persuaded De Beers to ship rough diamonds to Palestine. He founded the Israel Diamond Manufacturers Association in 1940.

In August 1947, Ben-Ami was arrested by the British along with the mayors of Tel Aviv and Ramat Gan and a number of Revisionist Zionist leaders in the aftermath of the Sergeants affair, which had taken place in Netanya. He was held in Latrun detention camp and released in October.

After a group of journalists left Yedioth Ahronoth to found the Maariv newspaper in February 1948, Ben-Ami provided financial backing for the new newspaper. He became a major shareholder in Maariv, and headed its board.

In 1956, the Israeli government approved the establishment of the city of Ashdod. Together with Philip Klutznick, Ben-Ami founded a company to carry out the city's construction. Ben-Ami influenced the city's design.

== Personal life ==
Ben-Ami was married to Yaffa and had three daughters, Hannah, Nitza, and Liora. His daughter Liora was married to Eli Landau, who served as mayor of Herzliya. He died in 1988 at the age of 83. Streets in Netanya and Ashdod are named for him.

== Bibliography ==
- Ben-Ami, Oved: Netanya: The Capital of the Sharon (1940)
- Ben-Ami, Oved: The Unbreakable Spirit of our Jewish Heritage (1964)
