= Fancy Color Research Foundation =

NGO promoting transparency and fair trade for the fancy color diamonds industry

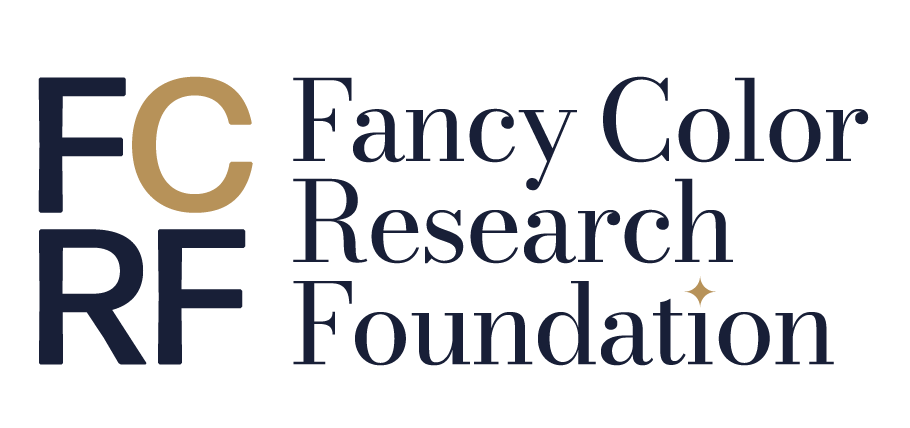
- Abbreviation: FCRF
- Formation: November 2014; 12 years ago
- Type: Non-trading
- Purpose: To promote and extend the Fancy Color Diamond segment by contributing to valuation transparency and fair trade through knowledge and data.
- Headquarters: Israel Diamond Exchange
- Services: Research, Fancy Color Diamond Index, Rarity Report, Diamond Diary, Pre-Auction Analysis, Live Auction Results
- Fields: Natural color diamonds
- Key people: Roy Safit (CEO)
- Website: www.fcresearch.org

Fancy Color Research Foundation (FCRF) is an organization that collects and analyses data on the global market for natural fancy color diamonds. It publishes the Fancy Color Diamond Index (FCDI), a quarterly benchmark that tracks wholesale price movements for diamonds in major trading centres, and provides research and valuation tools used by mining companies, traders, jewelers and collectors. It is headquartered in the Israel Diamond Exchange.

The foundation was founded in 2005 and officially inaugurated in November 2014 and is trusted by many leading jewelry brands, top tier segment players and leading publications. Proceeds from its activities are reinvested to continue progressing its mission and also to charitable initiatives.

FCRF conducts research into all aspects of the fancy color diamond market and publishes the Fancy Color Diamond Index (FCDI)–a quarterly analysis reflecting changes in wholesale buying prices. The index is based on pricing data contributed by handpicked strategic diamond manufacturers, traders, and jewelers worldwide.

In addition to the FCDI, the foundation has developed several industry tools and services:

Rarity Report: A data-driven report evaluating the rarity of a specific fancy color diamond based on market data, mining sources, and gemological documentation, including GIA data.

Diamond Diary: A tactical report that provides jewelers with key talking points for presenting a natural color diamond to clients with greater fanfare.

Pre-Auction Analysis and live Auction results: Independent assessments of fancy color diamonds offered at major auctions, extending professional insights for potential buyers. Live auction coverage feed is also provided directly through a dedicated WhatsApp channel.

Valuation Services: Objective evaluation report with extensive information for fancy color diamonds using the FCRF's proprietary IDU Grading Standard.

The IDU Grading Standard, developed by FCRF, is based on the valuation methodology outlined in Fancy Color Diamonds – The Pricing Architecture, authored by Eden Rachminov. It incorporates three visual parameters—Inner-Grade, color Dispersion, and Undertone. In aggregate, these form the foundation for assessing a diamond's aesthetic qualities and enable a more pin pointed value analysis beyond conventional gemological grading. Although the foundation was formally launched in 2014, its data collection efforts began in 2005. After nearly a decade of market research, the first Fancy Color Diamond Index was released in January 2015.

== History ==
The Fancy Color Research Foundation began in 2005 to collect data for fancy color diamond wholesale market prices. Data was collected for nearly ten years and the methodology has been vetted by independent auditors before the first quarterly Fancy Color Diamond Index (FCDI) was published in January 2015.[1] In addition to the FCDI, the foundation publishes proprietary research articles and develops digital tools for players in- and around the fancy color diamond segment.

== Research ==
FCRF publishes research articles on fancy color topics such as market research, auction analyses, and a range of other industry specific subjects. From 2005 to 2014, the FCRF confirmed that fancy color diamond segments have experienced a total appreciation of 154.7% on average.[2] Financial Times reported that Daniela Mascetti, a senior specialist in the international jewelry department at Sotheby's, has expressed interest in the FCRF's data because “the fancy color diamonds category is hugely nuanced and subjective."[3] In 2023 the FCRF published a comprehensive Market Study and in July 2025 in collaboration with the Natural Diamond Council the FCRF published an extensive Fancy Color Diamond Report.
