= Diamond Tower =

Skyscraper located in the city of Ramat Gan, Israel

- מגדל יהלום
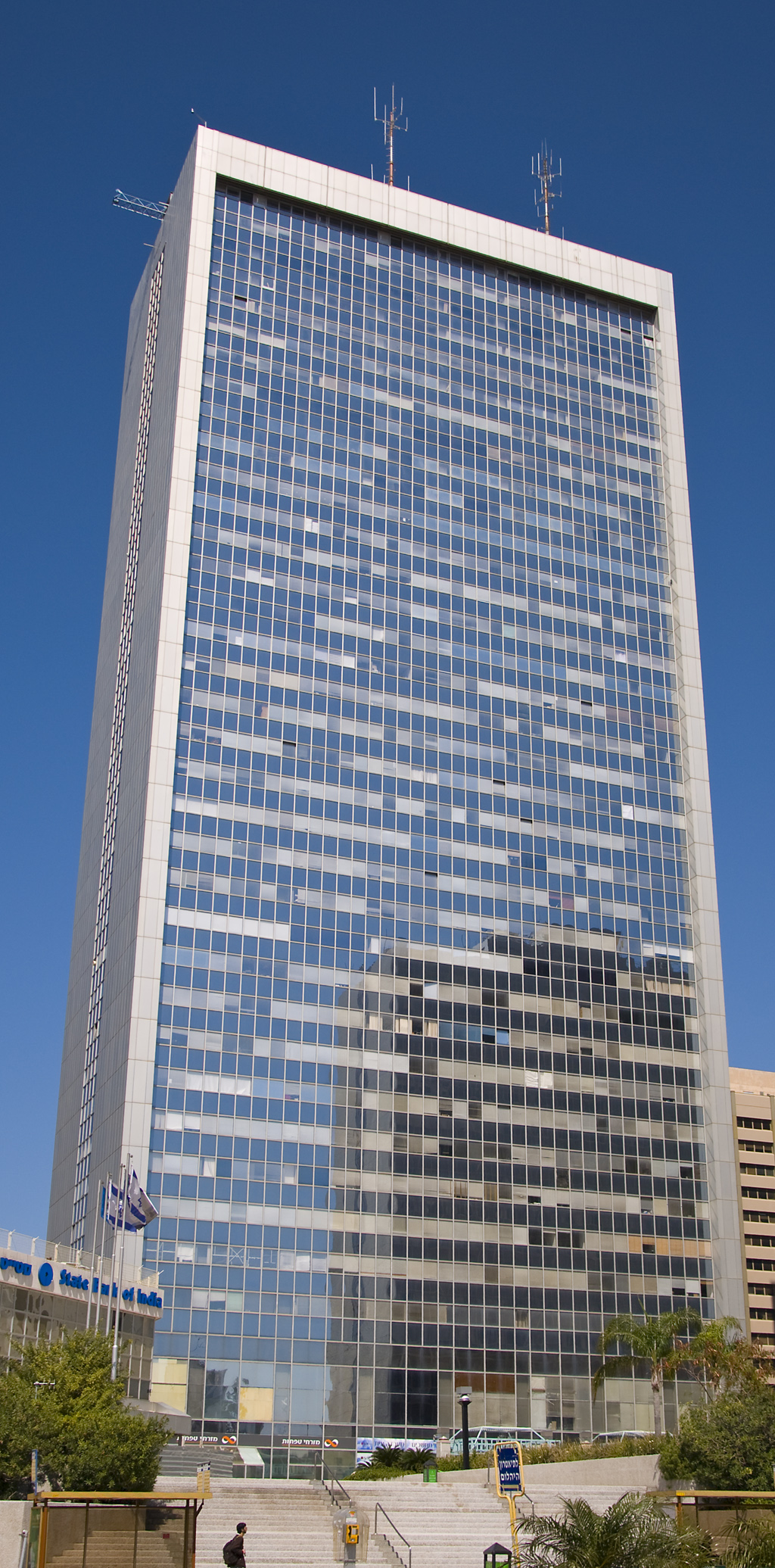
- Interactive map of the Diamond Tower area

General information
- Status: Completed
- Type: Offices
- Location: Ramat Gan, Tel Aviv District, Israel
- Coordinates: 32°5′0.30″N 34°48′5.34″E
- Construction started: 1989
- Completed: 1992
- Opening: Sep. 1993

Height
- Antenna spire: 147 m (482 ft)
- Roof: 115 m (377 ft)

Technical details
- Floor count: 32

Design and construction
- Architect: Eli Gvirtzman

The Diamond Tower is a skyscraper located in the Tel Aviv District city of Ramat Gan, Israel, containing the world's largest diamond trading hall, accommodating up to 1,000 people. At 115 meters and 32 floors, the tower was the tallest building in Ramat Gan from its completion until 2000, when it was surpassed by the Sheraton City Tower. It was also the tallest building in Israel outside of Tel Aviv upon its completion in 1992. Designed by Eli Gvirtzman, the tower serves as the 'head-tower' of the Israel Diamond Exchange with the first twenty floors serving only diamantaires. It has one of the largest diamond trading floors globally.

== See also ==
- List of skyscrapers in Israel
- Architecture of Israel
- Economy of Israel
