= Ariah Mohiliver =

Israeli chess player and editor

Ariah (Aryeh) Lev Mohiliver
- Born: Aryeh Lev Mohiliver; 16 May 1904; Białystok, Russian Empire (now Poland)
- Died: 7 March 1996; Jerusalem, Israel
- Notable work: Editor of Ha’shachmat; chess columnist for Doar HaYom
- Title: Chess master

Ariah (Aryeh) Lev Mohiliver (Mohilever) (Hebrew: אריה מוחליבר; born May 16, 1904, Białystok; died March 7, 1996, in Jerusalem) was an Israeli chess master and editor.

Born in Poland, he emigrated to Mandatory Palestine in 1920. Mohiliver was one of the country’s strongest players at the time, who was among the founders in 1922 of the first Jewish chess club in Palestine: the Emanuel Lasker Club in Beit Haam. He published two chess problems in the Egyptian Post in 1921 and then in Palestine Post, he was the chess columnist in a daily newspaper (Doar Hayom) and edited a chess magazine, Ha’shachmat, in Palestine in 1922-1924. He was still active in 1992, publishing, among others, a note on the 70th anniversary of Jerusalem's Rubinstein Chess Club.

Mohilever died in 1996 in Jerusalem, at the age of 91.
