= Israel Diamond Exchange =

Diamond exchange in Tel Aviv District, Israel

Coordinates: 32°5′0.84″N 34°48′8.51″E

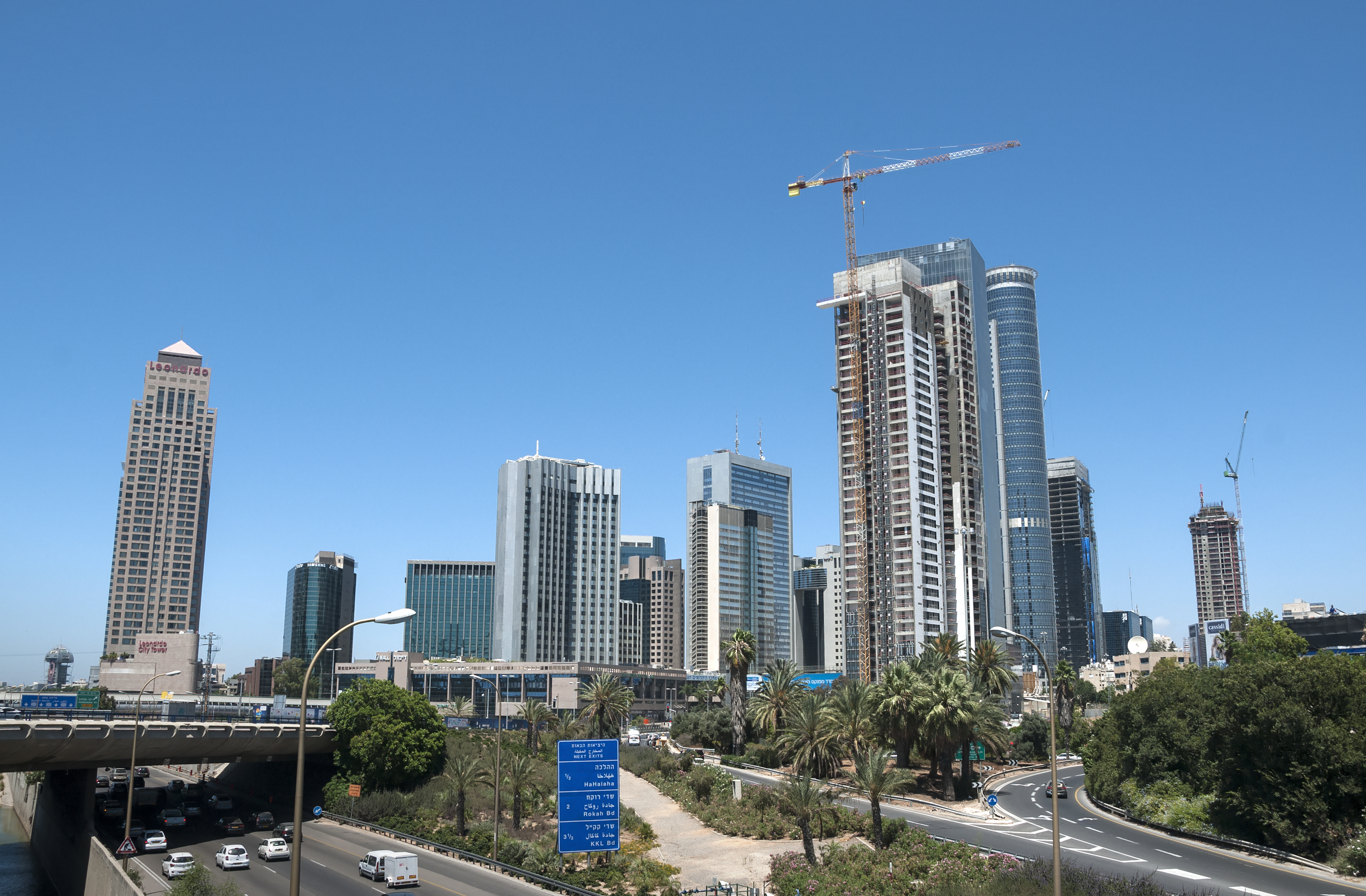
The Diamond Exchange District in Ramat Gan

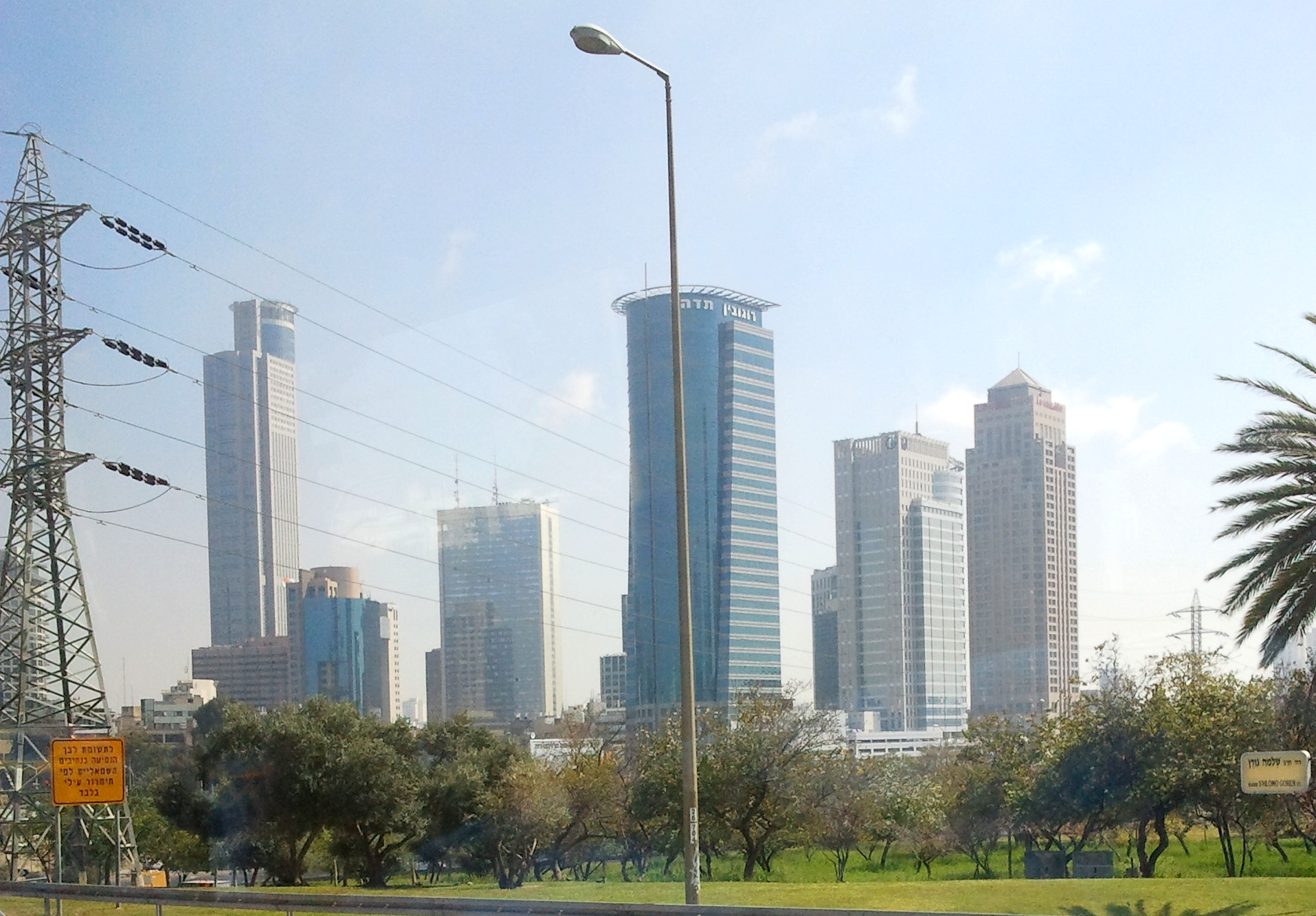
The Diamond Exchange District, March 2012

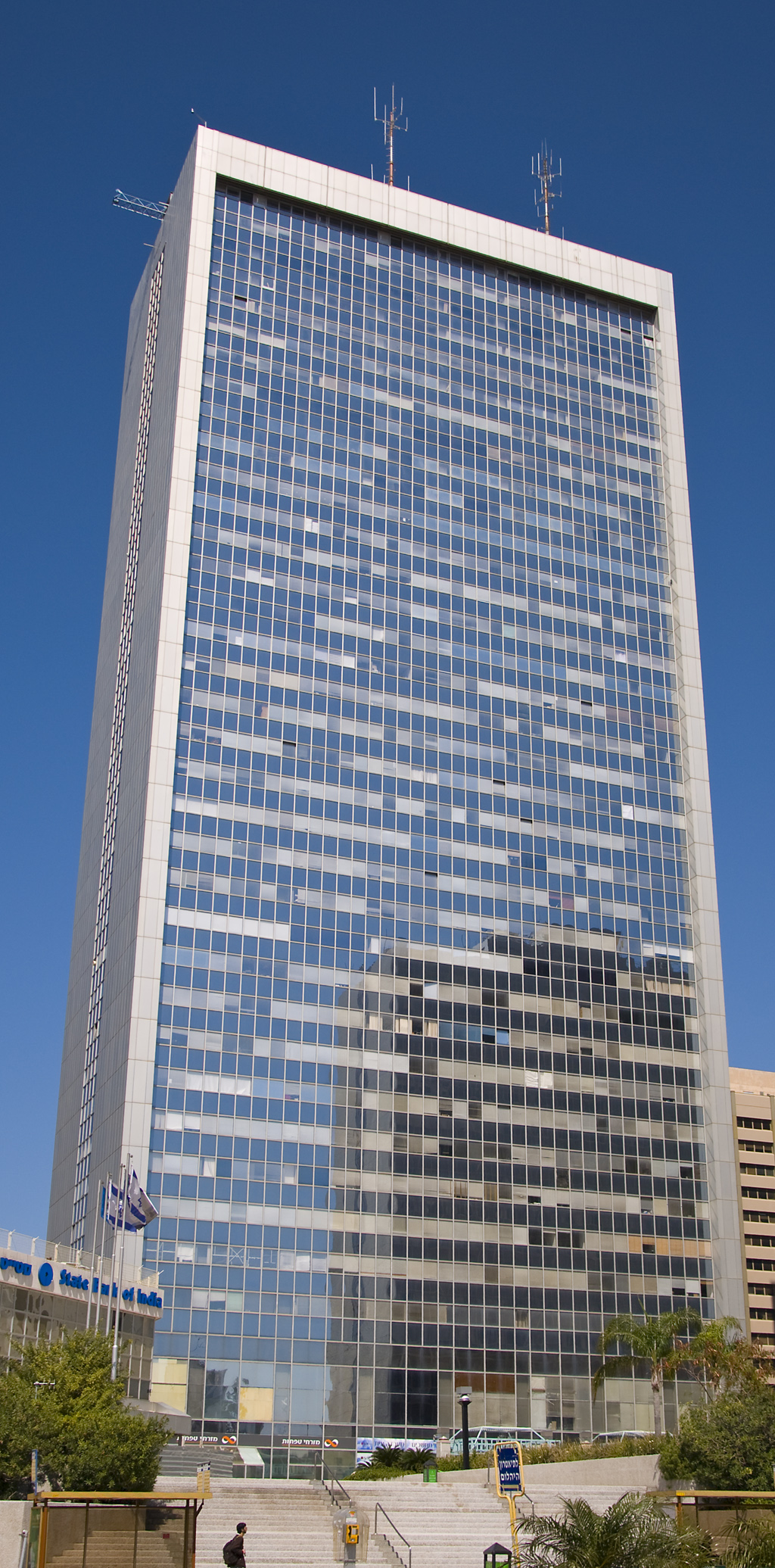
The Diamond Tower

Israel Diamond Exchange Ltd., located in the Tel Aviv District city of Ramat Gan, Israel, is the world's largest diamond exchange and the centre of Israel's diamond industry. The exchange is a private company that employs over 15,000 people from 1,500 companies; these diamantaires are engaged in diamond cutting and trading - marketing, brokerage, import and export. It exports approximately $5 billion worth of diamonds in a year.

The exchange operates from a complex of four buildings in area known as the Diamond Exchange District; the buildings are connected by bridges creating one complex, which contains the world's largest diamond trading floor; consisting of 1000 office rooms, restaurants, banks, post, and package delivery services.

== History ==
The first diamond cutting facility was opened in 1937 (Mandatory Palestine at the time), in Petach Tikva by two cousins Asher Anshel Daskal and Zvi Rosenberg professional diamantaires trained in Antwerp, originally from Romania during the British Mandate. The industry grew over the next seven years, but between 1944 and 1948 it suffered from the increasing lawlessness and in February 1948 closed down completely, with seemingly little chance of recovery.

After a new start and renewed growth, by the 1960s a trade association was established, which later evolved into the Diamond Exchange.

From 1967 to 1993 Moshe Schnitzer was President of the IDE, which grew rapidly under his direction. Exports of polished diamonds from Israel during this period increased from $200 million to $3.4 billion a year.

In 1968, the first building in the complex was opened: the 22-story Shimshon Tower, at the time one of the tallest buildings in Israel. During the 1980s, the Maccabi Tower and Noam Tower were constructed and in 1992 the tallest building in the complex was opened, the 32-story Diamond Tower.

== Trading ==
For many years the supply of rough diamonds was dominated by the Diamond Trading Company Sightholders, a selected group authorised bulk purchasers of rough diamonds (which includes also about 10 Israeli diamantaires, controlled by the De Beers Group, the single largest producer and purveyor of rough diamonds in the world. During the 1990s the stronghold of De Beers Group was weakened by diamond traders who engage directly with diamond producers in Russia and Africa.

== See also ==
- Moshe Schnitzer, key player in the international diamond trade, from 1967–1993 President of the Israel Diamond Exchange
- Dan Gertler
- Lev Avnerovich Leviev
