= Do'ar HaYom =

Hebrew-language newspaper

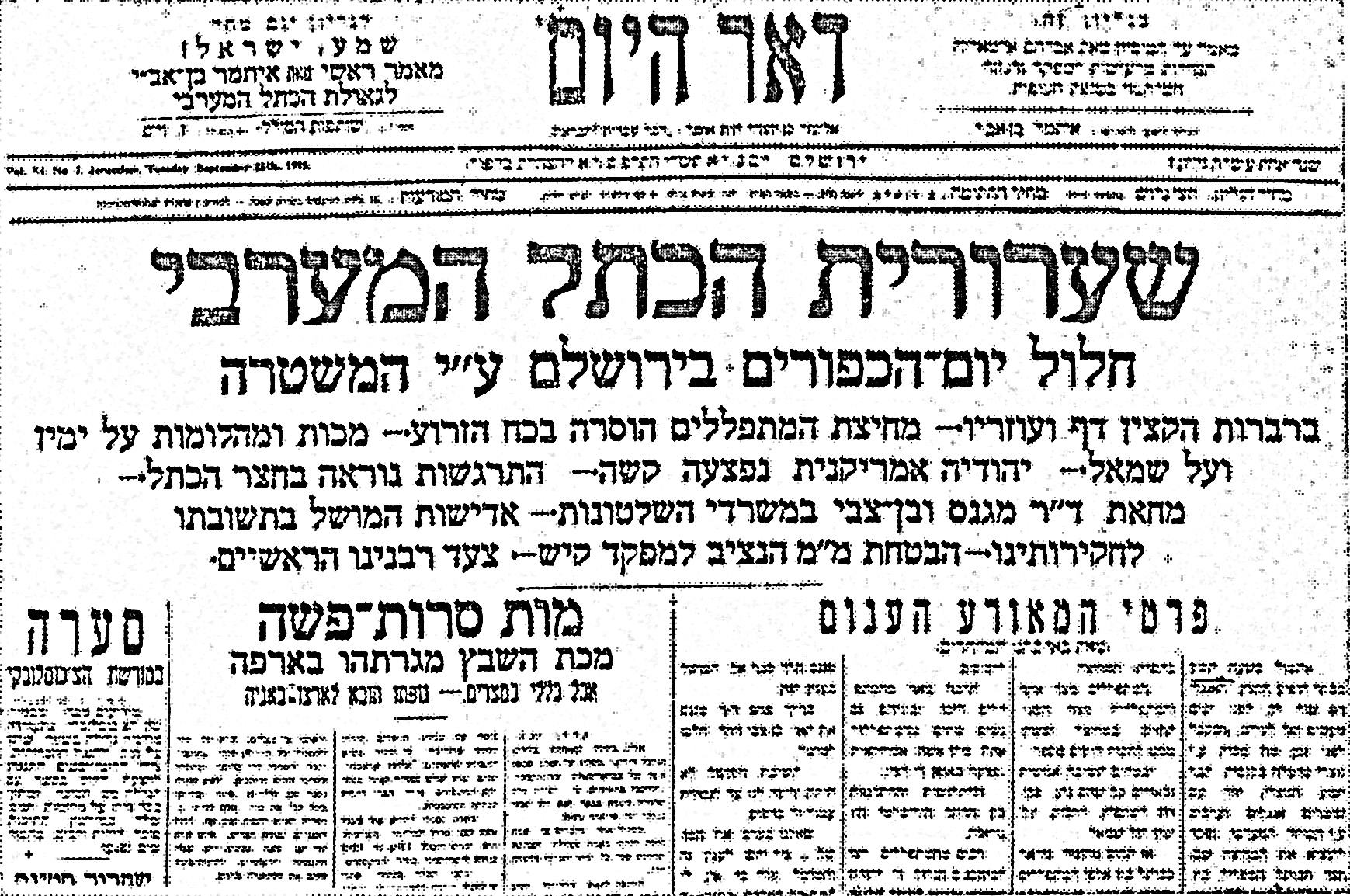
- September 1928 issue
- Type: Daily newspaper
- Founder: Itamar Ben-Avi
- Editor-in-chief: Issachar-Dov Bar-Drora
- Editor: Ze'ev Jabotinsky
- Founded: 1919
- Ceased publication: June 1936
- Political alignment: Center-right
- Language: Hebrew
- City: Jerusalem
- Circulation: 7,000
- Free online archives: www.nli.org.il/he/newspapers/dhy

Do'ar HaYom (Hebrew: דואר היום, lit. 'Daily Mail') also known as the Palestine Daily Mail, was a Hebrew-language newspaper that ran in the British Mandate for Palestine from 1919 to 1936 and was edited by Itamar Ben-Avi.

At its peak, the daily circulation of the newspaper reached 7,000 copies.

== Establishment ==
Do'ar HaYom was founded in Jerusalem by a group of activists native to the region who opposed the growing Russian-Jewish influence on Haaretz, and believed there was little passion behind their journalism. Among the founders of the paper included Menachem Asher Sapir, Alexander Aaronsohn, Peretz Dagan-Kornfeld, Isaiah Karniel, and Oved Ben-Ami, Ashkenazi Jews, as well as Shlomo Kalmi, Yitzhak Avraham Abadi, and Avraham Elmalih, Sephardic Jews. Elmalih also briefly edited its Arabic version: Barīd al-Yawm (بريد اليوم).

The project was headed by Itamar Ben-Avi, the son of Eliezer Ben-Yehuda, who began his career in editing under his father's papers prior to World War I. The goal of the paper was to serve as representation for old Sephardic families of Jerusalem, as well as for the second (younger) generation of the First Aliyah. The political orientation was center-right, and the newspaper found itself growing further apart from the growing movement of socialist beliefs in many leaders of the Old Yishuv.

The headquarters of Do'ar HaYom were located on HaSolel Street in Jerusalem, which later would be named after Havatzelet, another newspaper from the city.

== Editorial board ==
Many journalists who would become quite influential in Israel began their careers at the newspaper, including Uri Keisari, who was their correspondent in Paris and editorial secretary, Oved Ben-Ami, who was a reporter in Petah Tikvah, Aharon Even for the Upper Galilee, Issachar-Dov Bar-Drora, who served as the editor-in-chief, and Ovaida Kimhi, a French translator. Moshe Bar-Nissim, a close confidant of Ben-Yehuda, served as a member of the board for many years. Ariah Mohiliver was its chess columnist.

Karniel, a member of the Zikhron Ya'akov colony, and began his career at HaZvi, wrote a weekly satirical section from 1920 to 1928 under the title "Through the Disguise of Lessons in Looking" under his pseudonym of "Azmot". In the early 1930s, when Ben-Avi returned as an editor, he was co-appointed to manage the newspaper, and wrote articles on current affairs until his retirement in August 1933.

== Circulation, publication, and demographic reach ==
Unlike its main competitor, Haaretz, Do'ar HaYom was a daily morning paper. It was sold for a half penny, half the cost of Haaretz and Davar. Ben-Avi imported the first linotype machines. It heavily utilized dramatic, sensationalist headlines, often to the point of hyperbole, and heavy use of pathetic rhetoric. The paper contained many linguistic innovations for early Modern Hebrew. Regarding the competition, Ben-Avi stated "Haaretz may be honest, but it's not a newspaper. Do'ar HaYom may not be honest, but it is a newspaper."

A unique feature of the newspaper was its lack of political alignment. Compared to many other publications at the time, it did not have very strong leanings one way or the other. Moshe Carmon, a scholar and member of the editorial team stated that Ben-Avi was "all patient and free, and instilled a spirit of pluralism."

=== Feud with Haaretz ===
In March 1921, after a harsh critique of Menachem Ussishkin was published, many leaders of the Zionist movement, including Yosef Klausner, Chaim Arlozorov, Yitzhak Ben-Zvi, Boris Schatz, and David Yellin, issued a statement against the newspaper, accusing them of spreading misinformation. They published their response in Haaretz, stating it was necessary "to awaken public opinion in Israel and abroad about the great public deterioration that the newspaper Doar Hayom brings to our world. Irresponsibility, moral lawlessness, lack of a minimum degree of taste and politeness and culture – these are the fundamental qualities of this newspaper..."

The next day, Do'ar HaYom published a response from Ben-Yehuda, claiming that all who came out in opposition of the paper were "almost all teachers and writer of Haaretz and Hapoel Hatzair, and some officials of institutions" who came out against a competing newspaper. He further stated that attacks were coming from "those who have a grudge in their hearts against Do'ar HaYom because of its position on the question of schools, and the workers because of its position on the question of workers, and a few more people because of the private resentment they hold about Do'ar HaYom."

== Transfer of ownership and final years ==
In 1928, in an act that Ben-Avi later described as, "on a whim", the editorship of the paper was transferred to his friend, Ze'ev Jabotinsky. It was edited by Even-Chen. The majority of editors and directors were opposed to the transfer, mainly because Ben-Avi was far more moderate that Jabotinsky politically. Ben-Avi insisted, and even claimed that the transfer was personal and not political, and he had intended to only give the platform to Jabotinsky for a year. The transfer did not go according to plan, and after the reorganization of the paper under the movement of Revisionist Zionism, Ben-Ami, who was entitled to publish as many personal articles as he wanted, encountered opposition from the new editors hired by Jabotinsky, and was attacked publicly. His apparentment was painted with graffiti and many attempted to censor his speech.

Following the 1929 Palestine riots, Jabotinsky was barred entry into Palestine by the British government, and ownership was transferred to Shlomo Gepshtein, but the position was taken over by Yehoshua Yeivin, Wolfgang von Weisl, and Abba Ahimeir. All three were even more radical than Jabotinsky, and restored the sensationalist style of the old paper, but this time for political purpose. Ahimeir, for example, published a column in 1928 named, "From the notebook of a fascist". Another famous journalist for the paper at the time was Arthur Koestler, who left the country shortly afterwards.

Following its drastic shift in the late 1920s, Ben-Avi demanded that the paper be returned to him, but the editorial staff refused. Bnei Binyamin, an association that Ben-Avi lead, sent "a strong spirited and well-armed group of youths" to Jerusalem in order to physically remove the current staff from the office. The first issue after his return was published on February 22, 1931, and the motto "A popular daily newspaper" was added to the issue. Ben-Avi returned to the position of editor-in-chief. Despite this, its circulation dwindled, and the paper sank into a financial crisis.

In 1931, the murders of Yochanan Stal and Celia Zohar took place. The police failed to find their bodies, and the newspaper presented the investigation as evidence of the failures of the Jewish Agency for Israel, which it claimed had "bowed down" to the authorities. The newspaper subsequently hired private detectives, who were able to both discover the bodies and bring the murderers to justice.

=== Departure of Ben-Ami and closure ===
In July 1933, Ben-Avi resigned from the paper, and it was transferred to Shmuel Perlman and Pesach Ginsburg. The newspaper attempted to become more moderate, and tried to market itself to the urban middle class, which failed due to market domination by Haaretz and HaBoker. The newspaper closed in June 1936, and its rights passed to Leo Wintz, a Jerusalem publisher from Germany. In January 1940, an attempt was made to revive the newspaper on a smaller scale without success.
