= Twin Towers (Ramat Gan) =

Office buildings in Ramat Gan, Israel

- מגדלי התאומים
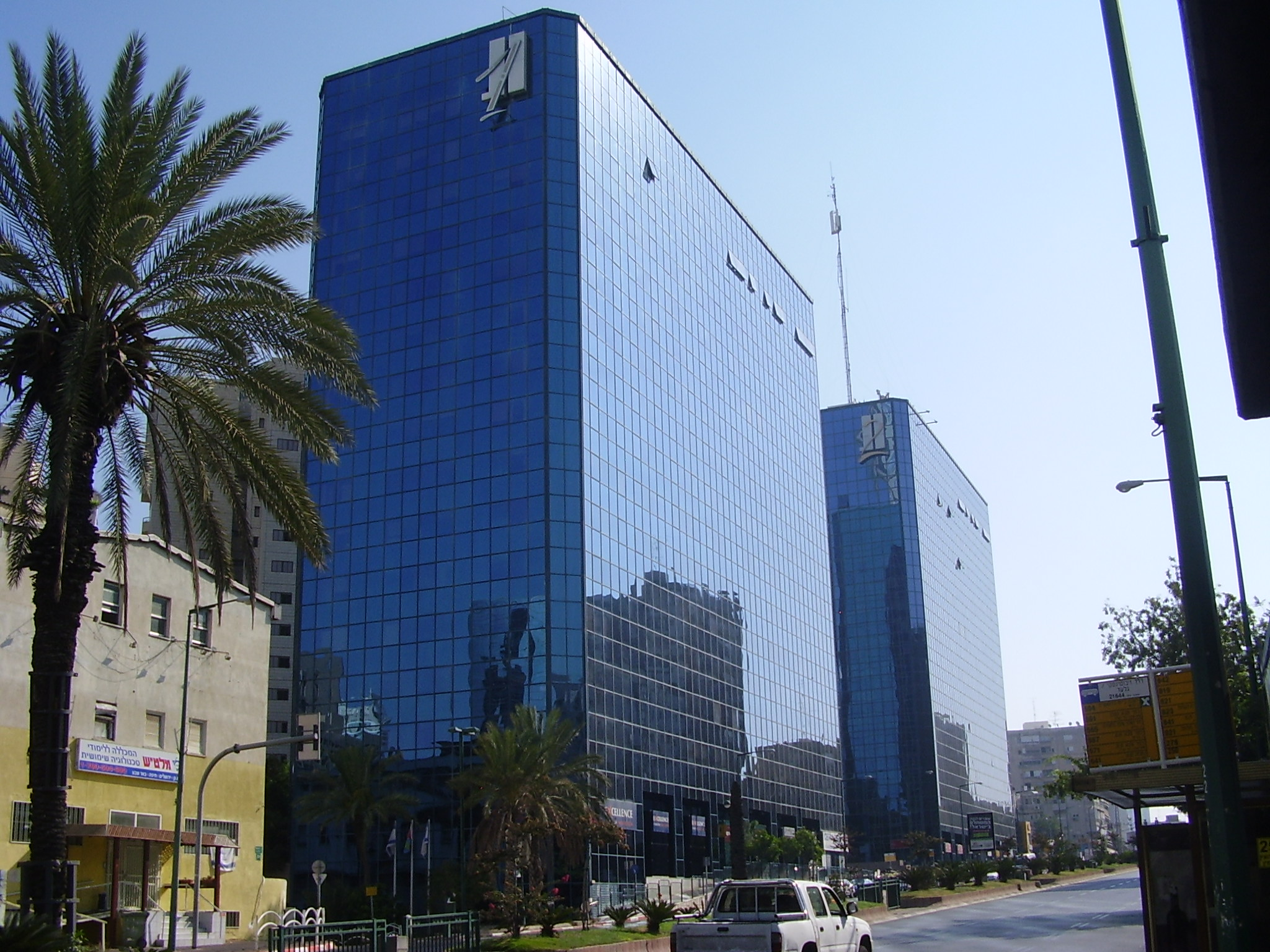
- Overview on the Twin Towers
- Interactive map of the Twin Towers area

General information
- Status: Completed
- Type: Business
- Location: Ramat Gan, Tel Aviv District, Israel
- Coordinates: 32°05′01″N 34°48′22″E
- Construction started: 1991
- Completed: 1994
- Opening: 1995
- Cost: 30,000,000$
- Management: MATNA (Twin Towers Ariel Properties), subsidiary of Nikhsei Ariel (Ariel Properties inc.)

Height
- Top floor: 53.6 meter

Technical details
- Floor count: 14
- Floor area: 26,000 m²
- Lifts/elevators: 6

Design and construction
- Architect: Yaski Sivan Architects
- Developer: Mas'ud Alikhani

The Twin Towers are two identical office towers on Jabotinsky Road in the Diamond Exchange District area in the Tel Aviv District city of Ramat Gan, Israel. They have 14 floors each and were built between 1991 and 1994.

Before their construction, the Asis candy factory was located in that territory and was laid down in November 1929. In 1989, a group of private investors bought the candy factory's land for a symbolic sum of 6 million dollars. The purchase was made through Twin Towers Inc. and Businesses Towers Holdings Inc. The two towers were planned by Yaski Sivan Architects, and include a built space of 26,000 square meters.

The fronts of the buildings are covered with reflective glass windows in a post modernist style. The two towers share underground parking with entrance in tower 1. Each of the towers contain two entrances: one from the lobby (Floor E1) and one from Jabotinsky Road (Floor E2). Between the two towers, there is a space with a pond in its middle.

== See also ==
- List of skyscrapers in Israel
- Architecture in Israel
