= Diamond Exchange District =

Commercial area in Ramat Gan, Israel

Coordinates: 32°05′06″N 34°48′07″E

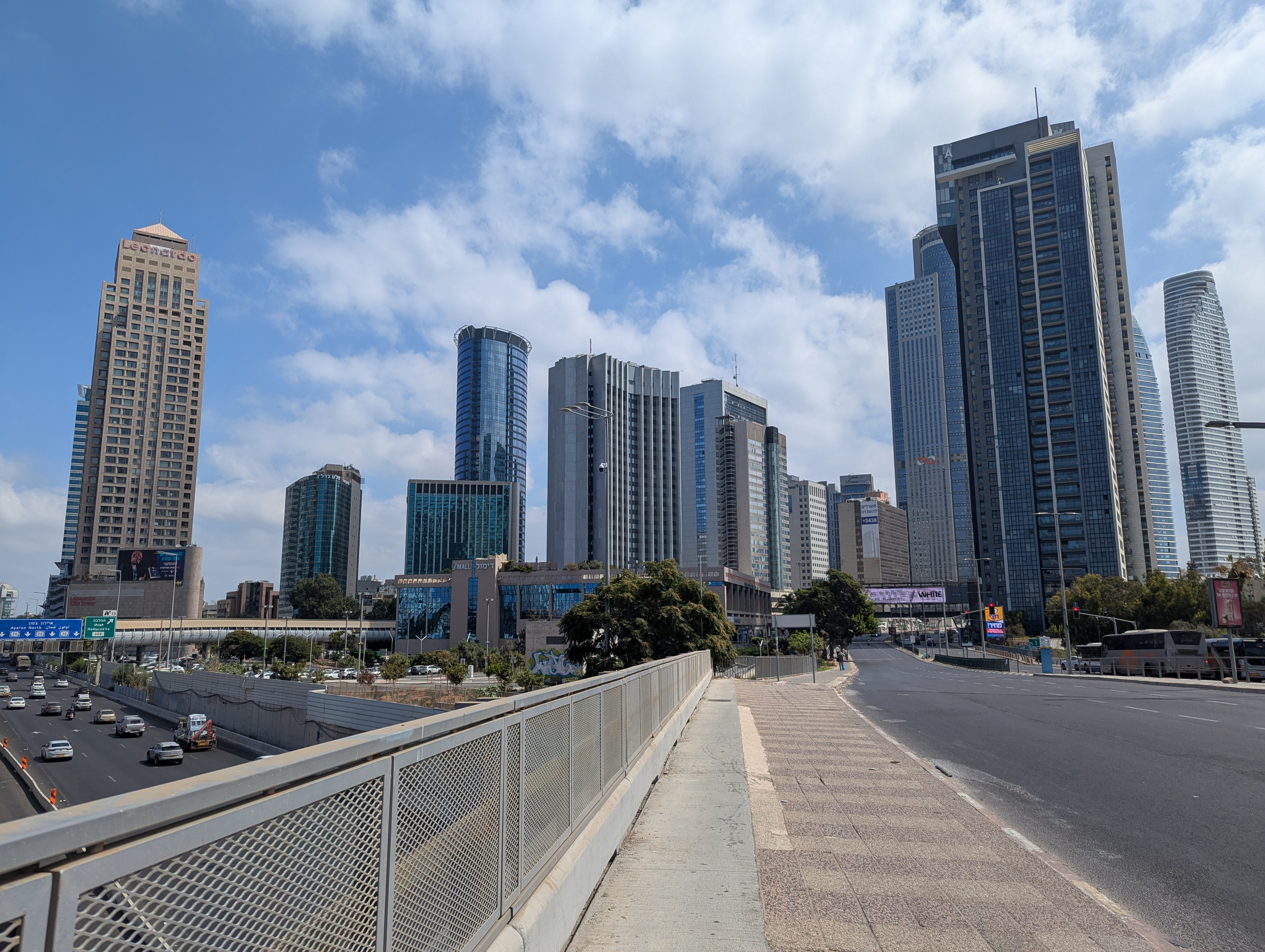
The Diamond Exchange District in 2025

The Diamond Exchange District (Hebrew: מִתְחַם הַבּוּרְסָה, Mitham HaBursa, lit. "The Exchange District") is a diamond district and commercial area in Ramat Gan, a city located in the Tel Aviv District, Israel. The district is the hub of Israel's diamond industry as well as a major commercial center. As of 2019, the district contains 1.1 million square meters of commercial and living space, and is responsible for 60% of Ramat Gan's municipal revenue.

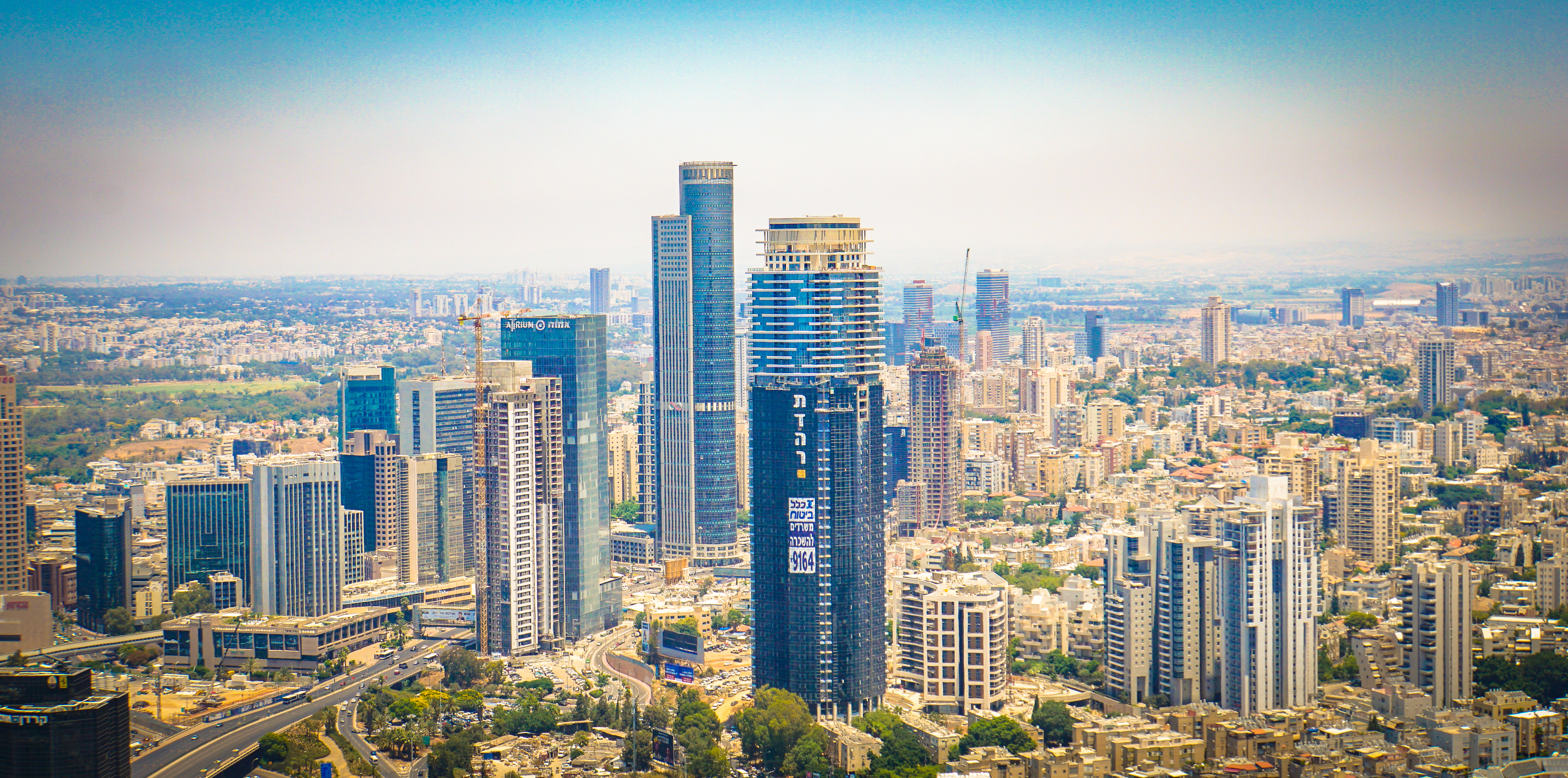
View of the Diamond Exchange District from the Azrieli towers

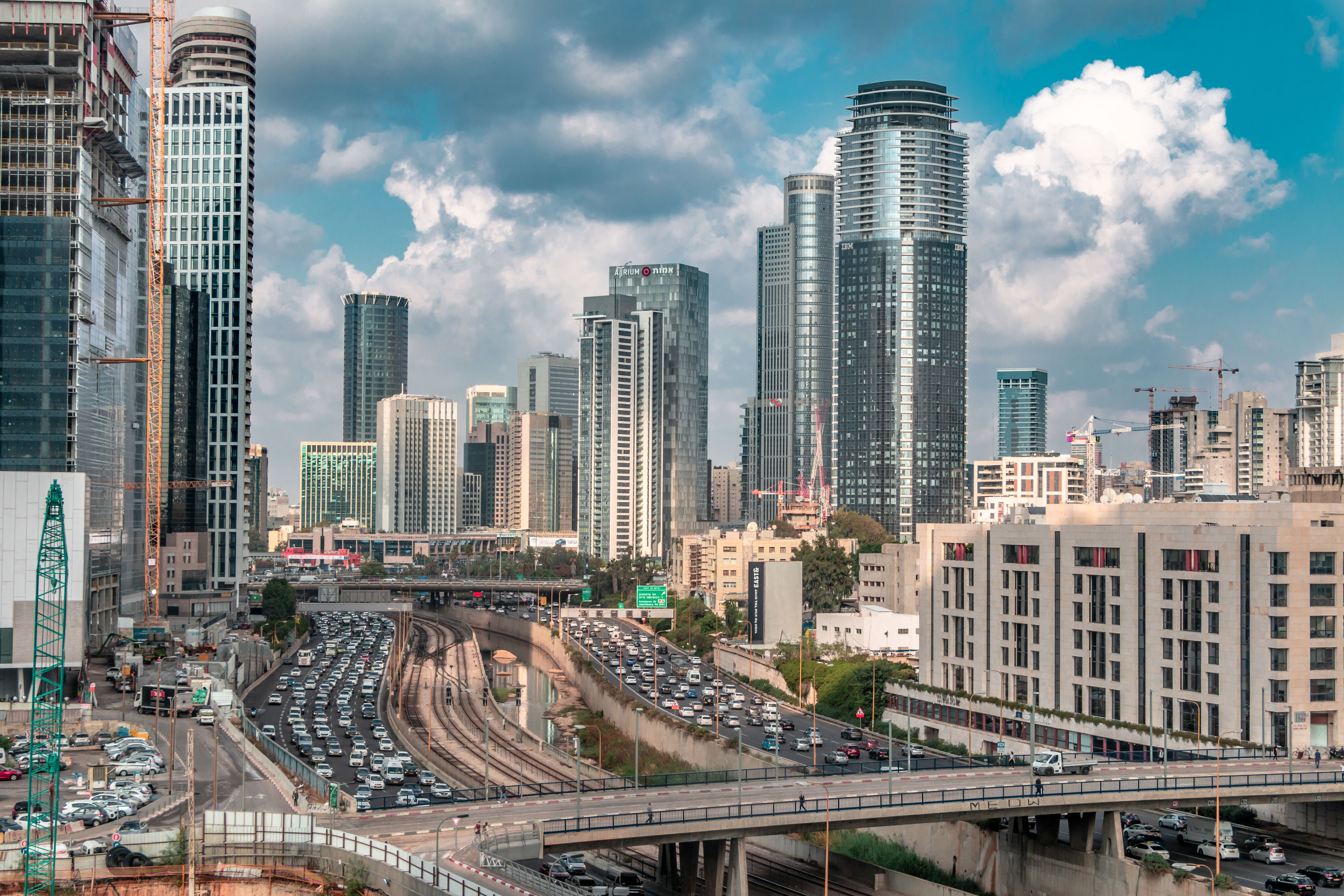
View of the diamond district from HaShalom bridge

The Israel Diamond Exchange, the centerpiece of the district, contains four buildings connected by bridges; the Maccabi Tower, Shimshon Tower, Noam Tower, and Diamond Tower. The latter contains the world's largest diamond trading floor and is the head-building of the exchange. Additionally, the district features several important buildings. Moshe Aviv Tower is Israel's second tallest building at 235 meters. Sheraton City Tower is a hotel in the district, whilst other notable buildings are the Ayalon Tower and Gibor Sport House. Tel Aviv's Central railway station is connected to the district by a pedestrian bridge.

Until 2018, the Harry Oppenheimer Diamond Museum displayed models of world-famous diamonds, including the Koh-i-Noor Diamond currently set in the crown of the King of the United Kingdom, the diamond given to Elizabeth Taylor by Richard Burton on her 40th birthday, and items such as an hourglass with "sand" made of diamonds, a diamond-set tennis ball and Biblically-inspired brooches incorporating diamonds.

== Development and History of the Complex ==
During the establishment of Israel, the Diamond Exchange was located on two floors on Ahuzat Bayit Street in Tel Aviv. In the early 1960s, discussions began about constructing an office building for the Diamond Exchange. After facing difficulties with the Tel Aviv Municipality, Abraham Krinitzi, the then Mayor of Ramat Gan, suggested that the building be constructed in Ramat Gan. On November 14, 1961, a contract was signed to purchase a 3.5-dunam plot for this purpose in an area that later became known as the Diamond Exchange Complex. The construction of the first office tower in the complex, the "Shimson Tower," took place between the laying of the cornerstone in 1964 and its inauguration on October 24, 1968. This building marked the beginning of the development of the Diamond Exchange Complex, which until then had only included small-scale industry and craft buildings. From 1946 to 1994, the municipal swimming pool "Gali Gil" was also located in the complex. The Leonardo City Tower Hotel now stands on the site of this former swimming pool.

== Foreign connections ==
Jewish merchants have historically and continue to engage in the diamond trade. Several congregations of Jewish merchants gave rise to prominent diamond districts, most prominently: New York, Israel and Antwerp. The Diamond industry trade is heavily based on mutual trust and communal relations between Jewish merchants over the world helped secure and expand trade. As a result, the Israeli diamond district became heavily connected with the New York and Antwerp centres. The New York diamond district was dominated by merchants from Jewish centres including the Israel centre.

== Buildings ==
=== Moshe Aviv Tower ===
The Moshe Aviv Tower is a 235-meter-tall mixed-use skyscraper which was the tallest building in Israel from its completion in 2003 up until 2017, when it was surpassed by the Azrieli Sarona Tower in Tel Aviv.

=== Leonardo City Tower ===
Leonardo City Tower is the tallest hotel in Israel. It was the tallest building in Ramat Gan from its construction in 2000 until 2001, when it was surpassed by the Moshe Aviv Tower.

=== Diamond Tower ===
The Diamond Tower containing the world's largest diamond trading hall, accommodating up to 1,000 people. At 115 meters over 32 floors, the tower was the tallest building in Ramat Gan from 1989 until 2000, when it was surpassed by the Sheraton City Tower.

=== Exchange Ramat Gan ===
Exchange Ramat is a complex consisting of a residential skyscraper and an office skyscraper, 206 and 198 meters tall respectively, connected by a commercial area in the bottom three floors of each building.

The site was previously home to a well-known Elite chocolate factory which became the namesake for the junction on which it sat ("Elite Junction"). Following the factory's acquisition and eventual demolition in the mid-2000s, plans for an "Elite Tower" were proposed and revised multiple times as the site changed hands over the years. Eventually, the current two-tower design was settled on and construction began in July 2020, by which point another adjacent tower had already been named "Elite Tower".

=== Ayalon Tower ===
The Ayalon Tower is an office tower with 35 floors that sits at 132 meters tall (excluding its decorative spire). The tower is named after the nearby Ayalon Highway, which is a major freeway that runs through much of the Tel Aviv metro area.

The tower was completed on May 10, 2009, after the construction was stopped in 2002 with only 17 floors due to lack of demand for office areas. On the top of the tower a helipad was built, and temporarily removed after 4 years in 2006 when the rest of the tower's floors were built.

An average floor in the tower covers 1,000 square meters large and the tower's parking lot is a total of 20,000 square meters. Among other corporations, the headquarters of Bank Otsar Ha-Hayal are located in the Ayalon Tower.

=== Gibor Sport House ===
The Gibor Sport House is 114 meters in height, has 29 floors and was completed in April 2000. The building was designed by AMAV Architects, the architects of the Moshe Aviv Tower. As such, it has many similarities in terms of its design, with many likening it to a scaled down version due to its similar shape and materials. The tower's car park connects to the parking areas of both its neighbours; Sheraton City Tower to the south and the Ayalon Tower to the north.

In 2014, the addition of 8 new floors was approved. Construction began in 2016 and finished in 2018. During the construction, the building got renovated.

=== HaKikar Tower ===
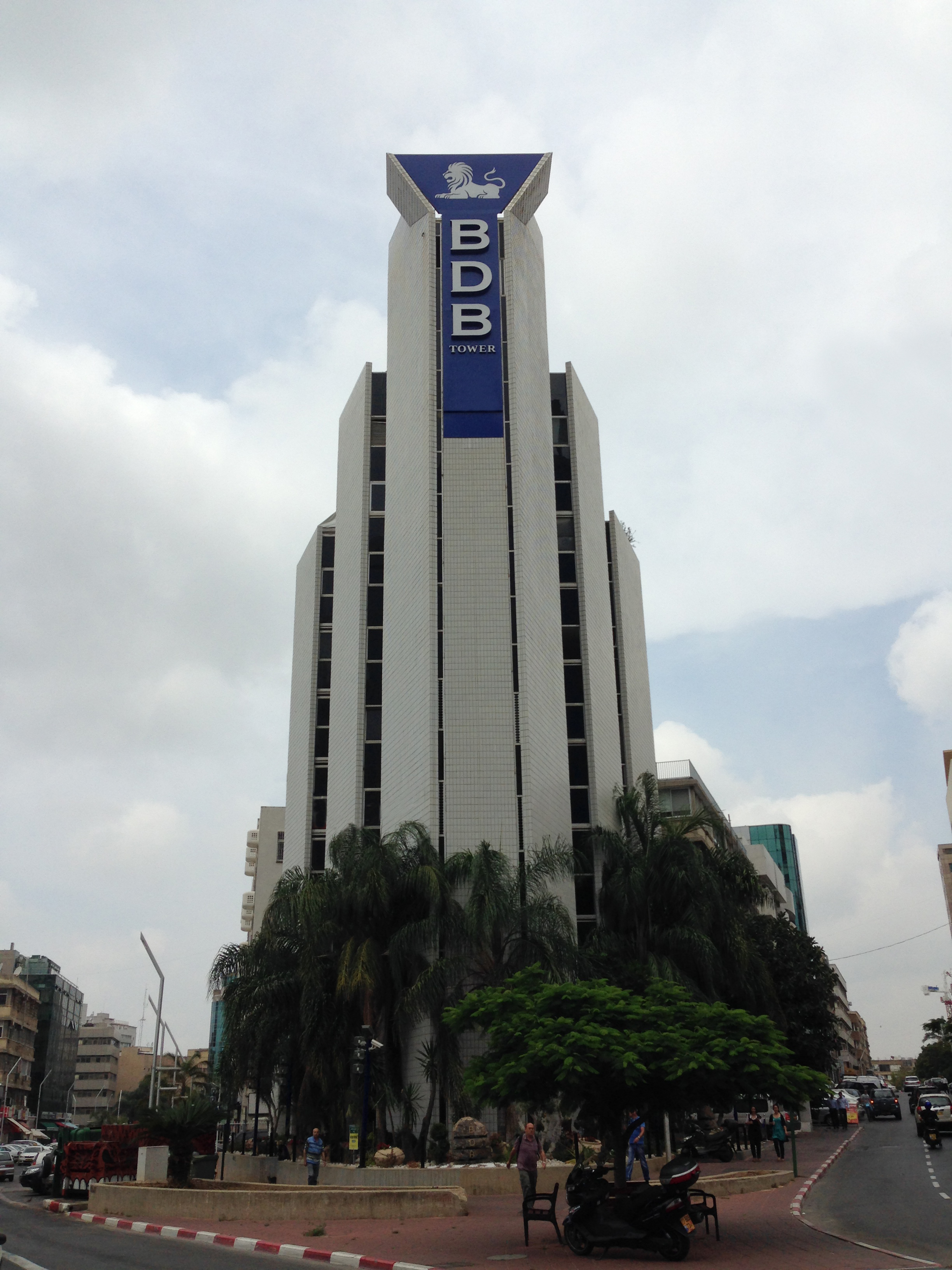
HaKikar Tower as BDB Tower

HaKikar Tower was home to financial company, Banc De Binary until 2017, and it was named BDB Tower. The building was designed by Gwircman E. Architects Ltd. and completed in 1988. It is situated on 38 Tuval Street, Ramat Gan. Its unusual modernism architectural design and use of concrete materials makes it one of the more noticeable buildings in the Exchange District. It has 10 floors and covers 3,000 square meters.

== Administration ==
Since 2015, the district has been administered by the Diamond Exchange District Administration. As of 2019, its annual budget was ILS 5 million. The administration is responsible for the physical upkeep of the public space, as well as marketing and general development.

== Future ==
As of 2019, the city of Ramat Gan is promoting a plan, drafted by architect David Galor, to increase the Diamond Exchange District's occupied space from 1.1 million square meters to 3.7 million. The plan includes a 120-floor tower, an addition of 1,000 apartments and a general urban renewal scheme for the district.

== See also ==
- Diamond District, New York City
- Antwerp diamond district, Belgium
- Silicon Wadi
- Economy of Israel
- Moshe Schnitzer, key player in the international diamond trade, 1967–1993 President of the Israel Diamond Exchange
- Twin Towers (Ramat Gan)
