= Leonardo City Tower Hotel =

- מלון לאונרדו סיטי טאואר
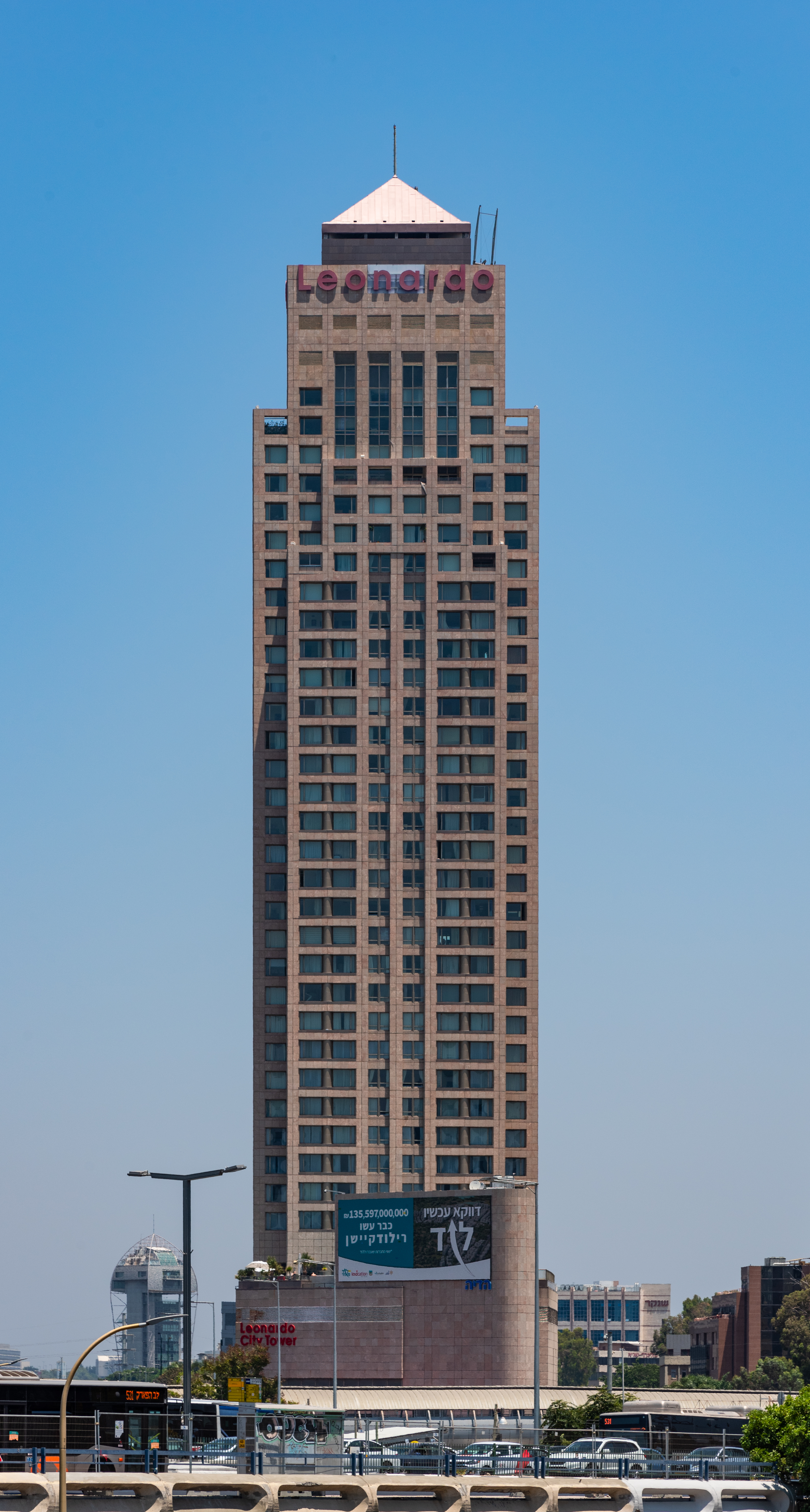
- Leonardo City Tower Hotel
- Interactive map of the Leonardo City Tower Hotel area

General information
- Status: Completed
- Type: Hotel, Apartments
- Location: Ramat Gan, Tel Aviv District, Israel
- Coordinates: 32°05′4.23″N 34°47′58.1″E
- Construction started: 1998
- Opening: 2000

Height
- Roof: 157 m (515 ft)

Technical details
- Floor count: 41

Design and construction
- Architect: Barely, Levitzky, Kassif Architects

Leonardo City Tower Hotel (Hebrew: מלון לאונרדו סיטי טאואר) is a skyscraper in the Tel Aviv District city of Ramat Gan, Israel, and the tallest hotel (although it also contains residential apartments) in Israel. It was the tallest building in Ramat Gan from its construction in 2000, until 2001, when it was surpassed by the Moshe Aviv Tower.

== History ==
The Leonardo City Tower was constructed from a design that won first place in a competition. The construction rate of the tower was incredibly quick with one story every five days, without failure. The building was completed in 2000 and operated as a Sheraton until 2009 when it joined the Leonardo chain. The building also contains 200 apartments which boast the benefits of hotel service.

== Apartments ==
The 200 apartments in the tower can access the hotel service from below, in addition to their own entrance to the building through a mini-mall. The facade is covered with granite and marble.

== Hotel ==
The Leonardo City Tower hotel operates on fourteen of the forty-two floors of the tower. Under the instructions of Sheraton, there is no thirteenth floor in the building, so the hotel operates from floors four to eighteen. The hotel has 167 guest units, including a Smart Presidential Suite, 31 Smart Executive Suites, 69 Smart Rooms and 66 Deluxe Rooms. The Sheraton City Tower was the first 5-star hotel in Ramat Gan.

== In popular culture ==
- An Israeli soap opera called City Tower is supposedly set in the building. The show was shown on local TV.

== See also ==
- List of tallest buildings in Israel
- List of tallest buildings in Ramat Gan
