= Diamond industry in Israel =

Diamond-cutting and trading in Israel

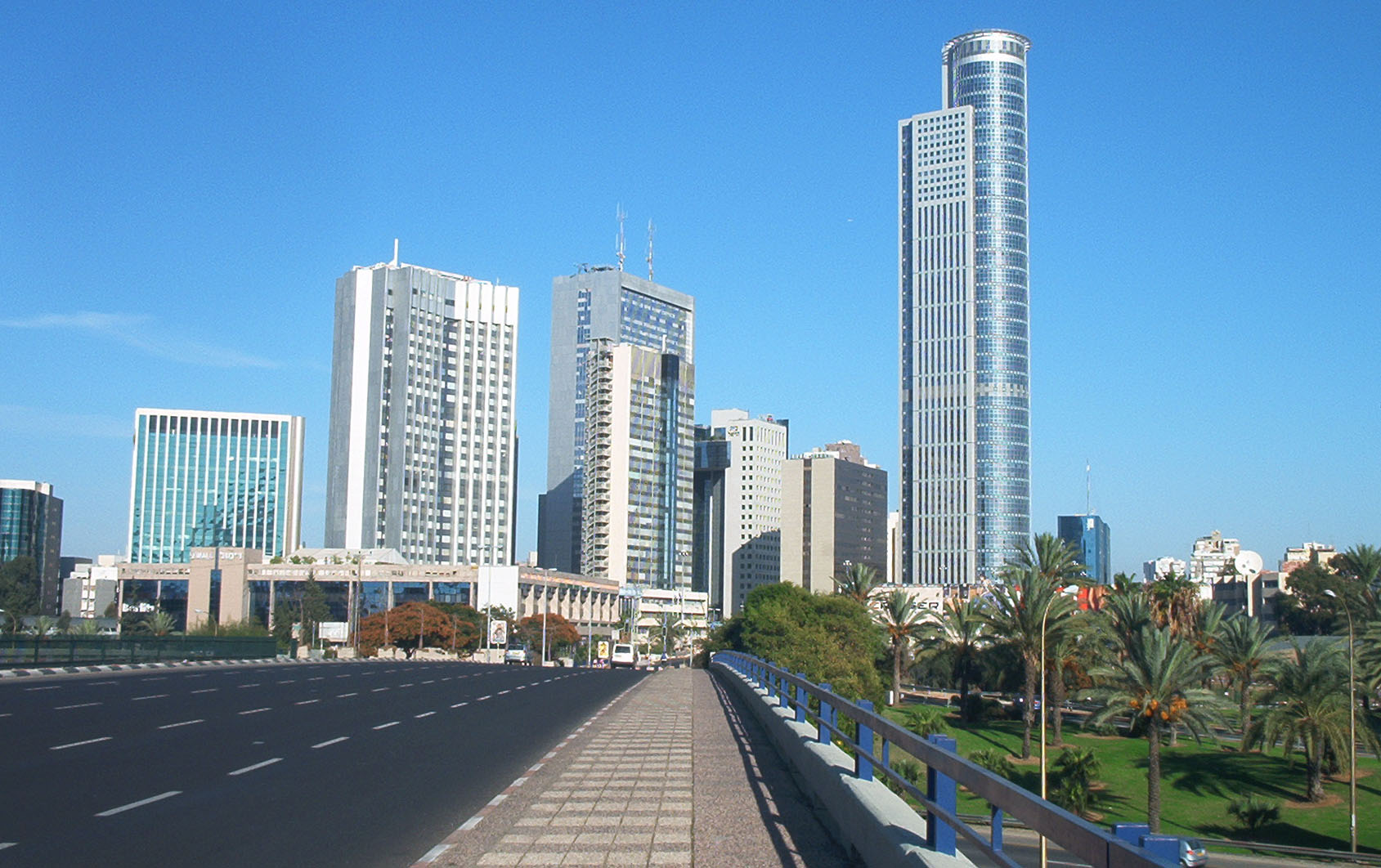
Diamond Exchange District in Ramat Gan

The diamond industry of Israel is an important world player in producing cut diamonds for wholesale. In 2010, Israel became the chair of the Kimberley Process Certification Scheme. In 2021, Israel exported about US$5.5 billion in rough and polished diamonds. According to the Observatory of Economic Complexity (OEC), in 2023 diamonds made up 9.28% of the country's exports.

== History ==
=== Pre-state beginnings ===
What was to become the Israeli diamond industry began in 1937, eleven years before the State of Israel was established, when the first diamond polishing plant was opened in Petah Tikva by Asher Anshel Daskal and Zvi Rosenberg, two experts diamantaires from Romania that immigrated from Belgium. In 1938 the 15% import duty on imported rough stones was removed. By 1944 the industry employed 3,300 workers in 33 factories, with £P 1,320,000 capital investment, entirely Jewish. The value of exports was over £P 3,200,000 mainly to the United States, Canada, and India; it was the largest value of any single commodity exported from Mandatory Palestine that year.

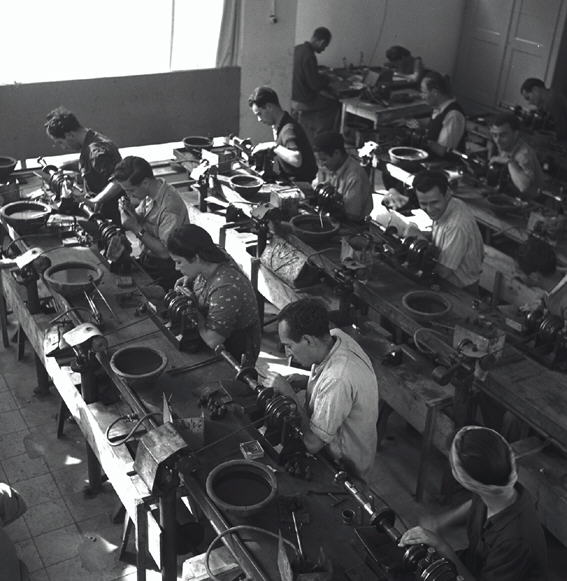
Diamond polishing factory, Netanya,1945

Between 1944 and 1948 the industry suffered from the increasing lawlessness and in February 1948 closed down completely.

=== First years of the State of Israel ===
After a state was declared, the consumer economy was shifted to a war economy. This came at the height of a diamond crisis, as many war-torn economies were struggling to re-establish.

During the first fifteen years of Israel's existence, diamonds and Jaffa oranges were the new state's main export products.

After reaching its lowest point in the wake of the 1948 closedown, the industry has continued to grow, producing a world leader in the diamond industry.

== Current state ==
In the beginning of the 21st century, Israel is one of the world's three major centers for polished diamonds, alongside Belgium and India. Israel's net polished diamond exports slid 22.8% in 2012 as polished diamond exports fell to $5.56 billion from $7.2 billion in 2011. Net exports of rough diamonds dropped 20.1% to $2.8 billion and net exports of polished diamonds slipped 24.9 percent to $4.3 billion, while net rough diamond imports dropped 12.9 percent to $3.8 billion. The United States is the largest market accounting for 36% of overall export market for polished diamonds while Hong Kong remains at second with 28 percent and Belgium at 8% coming in third.

In 2007, when diamonds still constituted almost 24% of Israel's total exports, 12% of world diamonds (by their value) were polished in the country. In 2010 this number decreased to 9%. As of 2016, diamonds amounted to 28% of Israel's total exports and they were still 12% of the world's production.

== Trading infrastructure ==
The industry is located in the "Diamond District", located in Ramat Gan in the Tel Aviv District. The complex is made up of four buildings, interconnected with walkways. The entire trading operation takes place in this complex. The Diamond Tower in the district contains the world's largest diamond trading floor.

Israel's government funds a non-profit industry body, the Israel Diamond Institute, to represent organisations and institutions involved in Israel's diamond industry.

== Industry principles ==
The Boycott, Divestment and Sanctions (BDS) campaign has called for diamonds processed in Israel to be considered conflict diamonds.

The Israel Diamond Institute (IDI) Group of Companies is a non-profit, public interest company that represents all organizations and institutions involved in Israel's diamond industry. The main functions of the Institute are marketing and business development, promotion of rough diamond trading, professional training, security consultancy, technological research and development and trade shows.

== See also ==
- Economy of Israel
- Moshe Schnitzer, key player in the international diamond trade, from 1967-1993 President of the Israel Diamond Exchange
