= Moshe Schnitzer =

Israeli businessman

- משה שניצר
- Schnitzer in 2004
- Born: 1921; Romania
- Died: August 16, 2007 (aged 86); Israel
- Occupation: Diamond trader
- Known for: President of the Israel Diamond Exchange (1967-1993)
- Relatives: Shmuel Schnitzer (son); Dan Gertler (grandson)

Moshe Schnitzer (Hebrew: משה שניצר; 1921 – August 16, 2007) was a Romanian Jewish immigrant to Israel who became a key player in the international diamond trade. From 1967 to 1993 he was President of the Israel Diamond Exchange (IDE), which became the world's largest diamond exchange.

== Early years ==
Schnitzer was born in Chernowitz, then in Romania, in 1921. He emigrated to British-ruled Palestine in 1934, and later studied history and philosophy at the Hebrew University of Jerusalem.

In 1942, pushed by his father, he entered the diamond business. He left university to work in a diamond polishing plant only under protest. Schnitzer learned sawing and cutting at Pickel's factory in Tel Aviv, where he became a work manager in 1944. In 1945 he and Shlomo Vinikov founded the Society for the Development of the Diamond Industry in Palestine. In 1944 he initiated and became publisher of HaYahalom (The Diamond), the industry's journal, which appears until today. In 1946 Schnitzer and Elhanan Halperin co-authored Diamonds (Yahalomim), an instruction book in Hebrew.

Schnitzer also fought in the Irgun, a Zionist paramilitary group that was seeking to establish a Jewish state in Palestine. The connections he made there with future leaders helped him later in his business life. He became an Irgun member in 1941, and a soldier of the Israeli army after its amalgamation into the army in 1948.

In 1947 he was one of the founders of the Israel Diamond Exchange (ISDE), created by the unification of all diamond institutions in the country. Schnitzer was elected ISDE Vice President in 1949.

Schnitzer and a partner launched the firm of Schnitzer-Greenstein in 1952. In 1960 he opened his own firm, M. Schnitzer & Co., with his son Shmuel Schnitzer and son-in-law Shai Schnitzer.

== Israel Diamond Exchange President ==
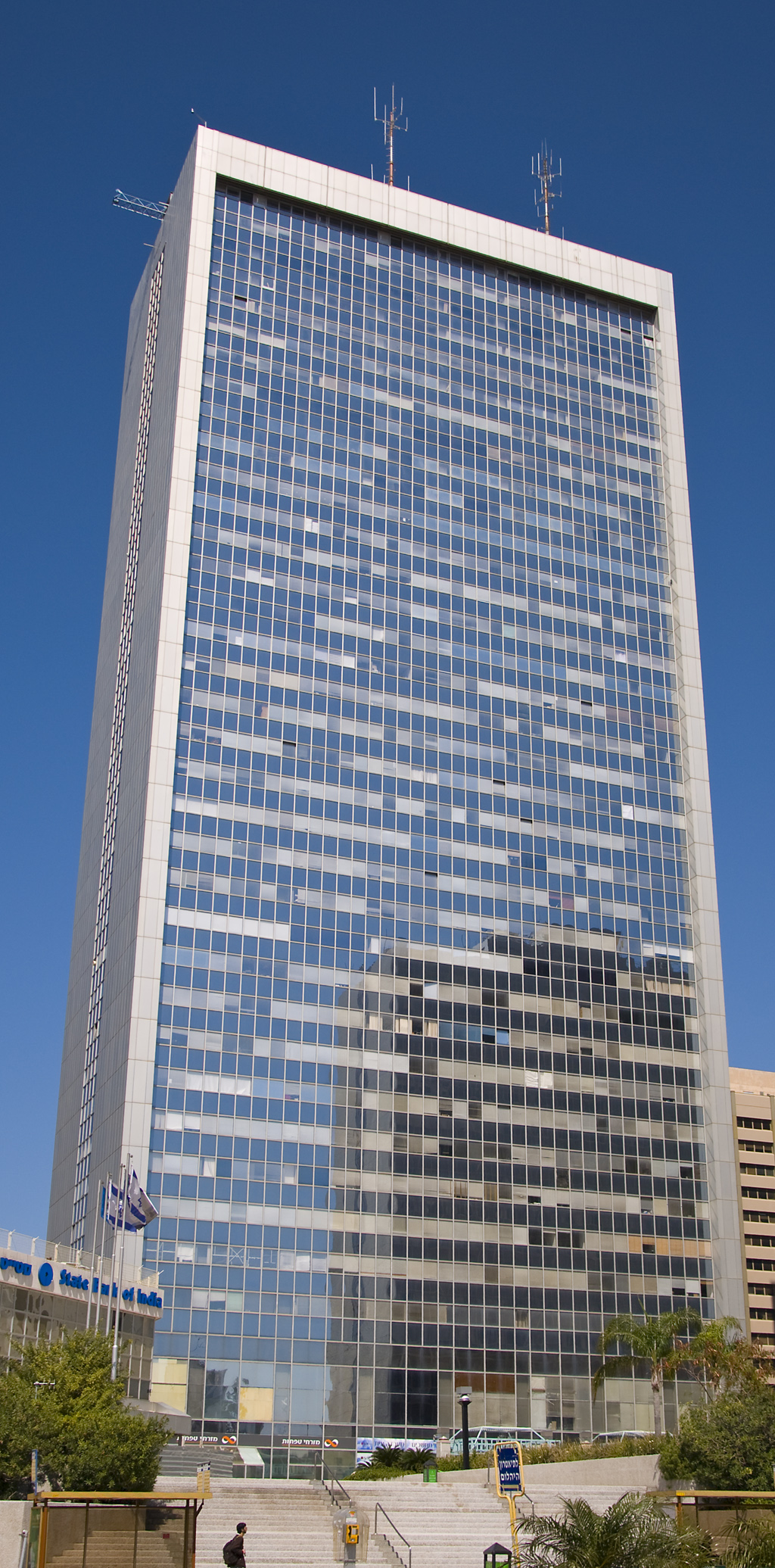
IDE Diamond Tower, opened in 1992

From 1967 to 1993 Schnitzer was President of the Israel Diamond Exchange. During his long tenure the exchange was transformed from an organization with a relatively marginal position in the international market into the largest and most modern exchange in the world. Annual exports on polished diamonds from Israel grew during his tenure 17-fold, from $200 million to $3.4 billion.

=== Related activities ===
Schnitzer was also the President of the World Federation of Diamond Bourses (WFDB) from 1968 to 1972, and from 1978 to 1982. He was responsible for the establishment in 1982 of the Schnitzer Foundation for Research on the Israeli Economy and Society at Bar-Ilan University, dedicated to funding academic research on economic and social topics. Schnitzer arranged to establish the Harry Oppenheimer Diamond Museum in Ramat Gan in 1986 and was the museum's Chairman until July 2003.

== Diplomatic activity ==
There were political aspects to his position. Israeli Prime Ministers Yitzhak Rabin and Golda Meir both used Schnitzer to convey messages to the Soviet Union under the disguise of conducting diamond transactions. Under Indira Gandhi, India had been highly critical of Israel's policy, and public hostility persisted after her death in 1984. For this reason, when India applied to join the World Federation of Diamond Bourses in July 1986, Moshe Schnitzer said Israel was against admitting India. However, the next month officials of the Israel Diamond Exchange said the application had not been rejected.

== Honors and legacy ==
Moshe Schnitzer was awarded the Israel Prize in 2004, the highest civilian award given by Israel. The award was given for "making a special contribution to the State of Israel and Israeli society". It recognized his pivotal role in making Israel one of the main diamond manufacturing centers in the world. He was also awarded the Order of King Leopold of Belgium for his contribution to the international diamond industry. He was given an honorary doctorate from Bar-Ilan University. The plaza adjacent to the diamond exchange in Ramat Gan is called the Moshe Schnitzer Plaza.

Schnitzer died in August 2007. At his funeral, he was eulogized by former Israel Prime Minister Benjamin Netanyahu, former Chief Rabbi Israel Meir Lau and other prominent men. In May 2008, during the opening ceremony of the World Diamond Congress in Shanghai, he posthumously received the first-ever Diamantaire of the Year award. His son, Shmuel Schnitzer, was also a president of the IDE and the WFDB. His grandson Dan Gertler became prominent in the diamond business in Africa. Gertler is the first in his family to deal in rough diamonds rather than polished stones, which complements Shmuel Schnitzer's ambition for Israel to displace Antwerp, Belgium as the world's largest diamond center.

According to WFDB president Ernest Blom, "Moshe Schnitzer was a visionary. After laying the foundation in Israel for what would grow, largely according to his plan, into one of the world’s most important diamond centers, he turned his attention to the WFDB and the international diamond trade. He realized that our strength lay in our ability to complement one another, working together as an international network of colleagues, rather than as competitors. Generations of diamantaires from all over the world considered him a mentor and a leader".
