= Diamantaire =

Diamond manufacturer, cutter, and/or specialist gemologist

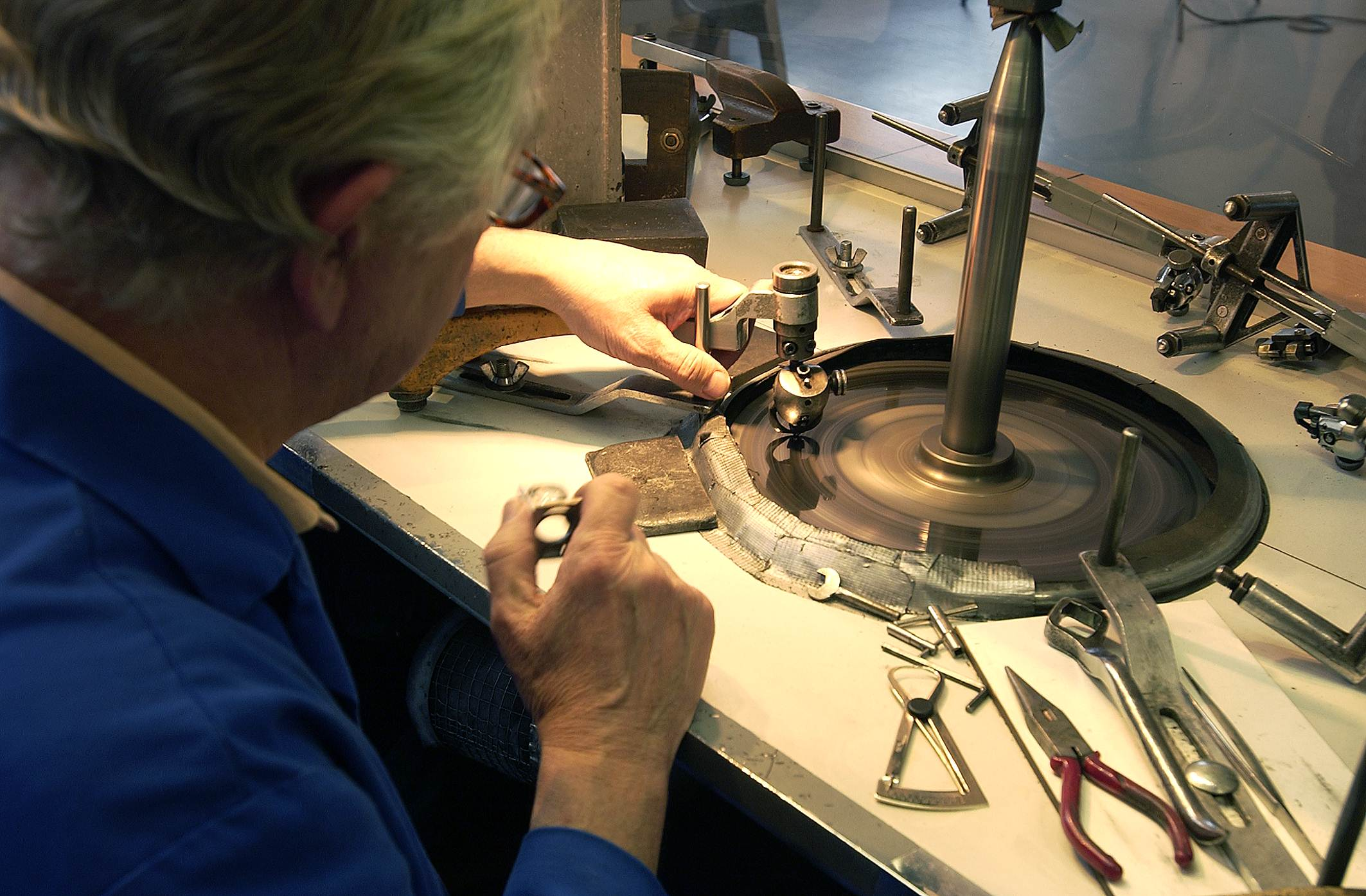
Polishing a diamond

A diamantaire (French origin) is a gem-quality diamond manufacturer or producer, master diamond cutter, and/or a graduate gemologist specializing in diamonds.

Such individuals demonstrate considerable expertise in different types of gemstones, particularly when it comes to increasing the value and quality of a rough or raw diamond.

They are highly skilled craftsmen or artisans who are responsible for cutting, polishing and transforming a rough diamond into a finished gemstone ready for setting.

Members of diamond dealing families who have established themselves in the upper echelons of the world diamond industry hierarchy are also often referred to as diamantaires as well.

== See also ==
- Diamond cutting
