= Exchange Ramat Gan =

Building complex under construction in Ramat Gan, Israel

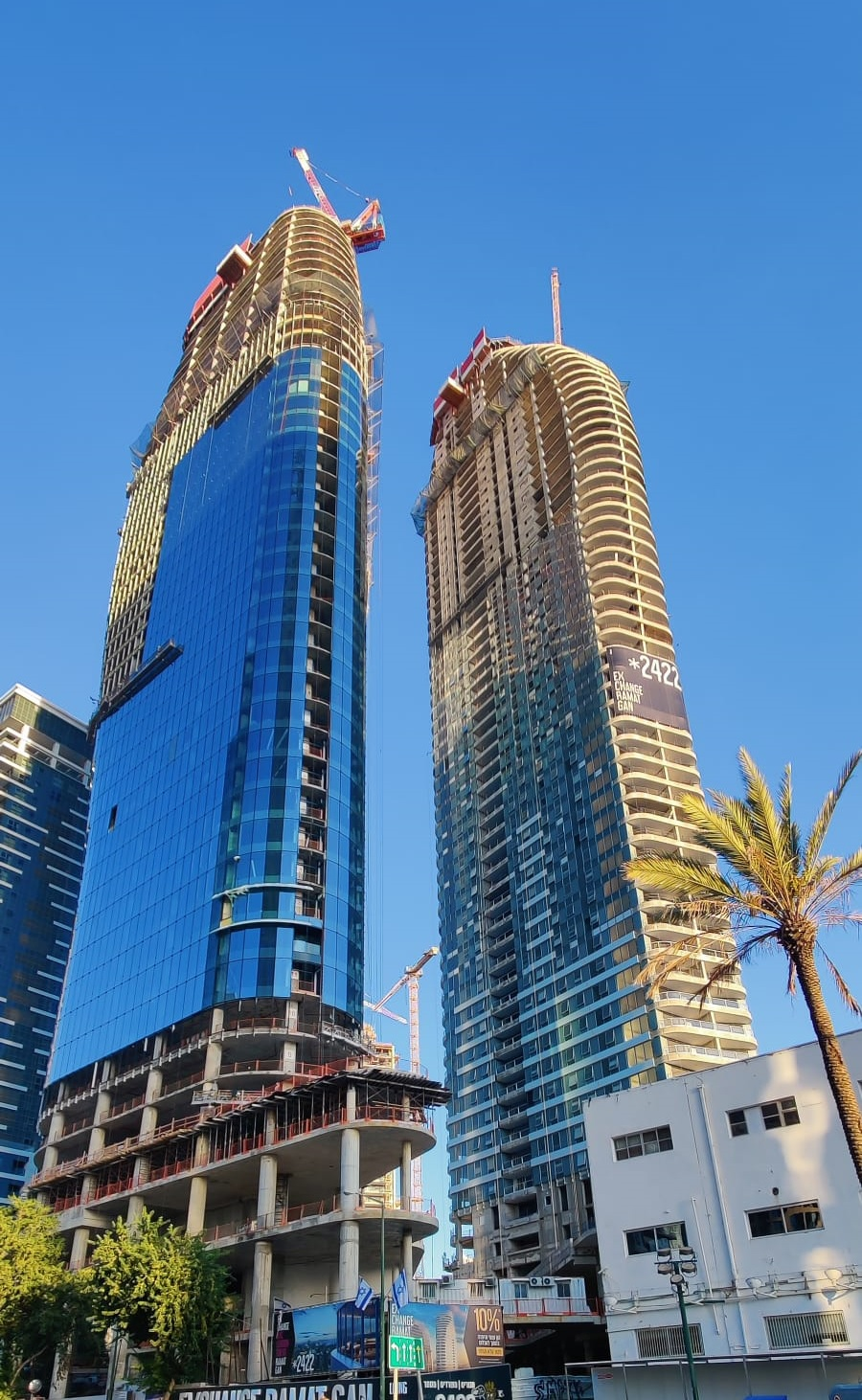
- Construction of the office building (left) and residential building (right) that comprise Exchange Ramat Gan

General information
- Status: Under construction
- Location: Diamond Exchange District, Ramat Gan, Tel Aviv District, Israel
- Coordinates: 32°4′57.2″N 34°48′17.3″E
- Construction started: 2020
- Estimated completion: 2024

Height
- Height: Residential Building: 205.95 m (675.7 ft); Office Building: 198 m (650 ft)

Technical details
- Floor count: Residential Building: 61; Office Building: 50

Website
- xchange.co.il

Exchange Ramat Gan is a building complex that includes two skyscrapers located near the Diamond Exchange District in the Tel Aviv District city of Ramat Gan, Israel. Of the two towers, the taller tower, at 206 m (676 ft) tall, will serve as a residential building, and contains 61 floors: 3 commercial floors, a mezzanine, 55 residential floors, and 2 mechanical floors, and will overall include 355 residential units. The shorter tower, at 198 m (650 ft) tall, will serve as an office building and includes 50 floors.

The complex sits on 11 of the 15 dunams (2.7 out of 3.7 acres) of land that used to house an Elite chocolate factory, from which 4 dunams remain preserved and contains a building that is currently used by Shenkar College.

== History ==
=== Elite Chocolate factory ===
The Elite chocolate factory was established in 1934 by Aharon Promanchenko in Ramat Gan. In 1922, Promanchenko established the "Laime" chocolate factory in Riga which grew to employ over 700 people, but following the Nazi's rise to power in Europe, in 1932 Promanchenko sent representatives that bought a lot in Ramat Gan and he promptly moved to Israel in 1933, bringing with him one of the factory's chocolate-making machines. A year after immigrating, Promanchenko established the Elite chocolate factory with the help of a group of investors; some were Israeli investors, while others were partners from the factory in Riga.

After four years, Elite began exporting its products internationally to countries such as the United States, the United Kingdom, and South Africa. In World War II, Elite won a contract to produce chocolate for the British military as well as the rest of the allied forces, greatly increasing production and leading to the expansion of both the factory and its workforce. In 1956, Elite would build another factory near Nazareth, which would go on to become Elite's new flagship factory.

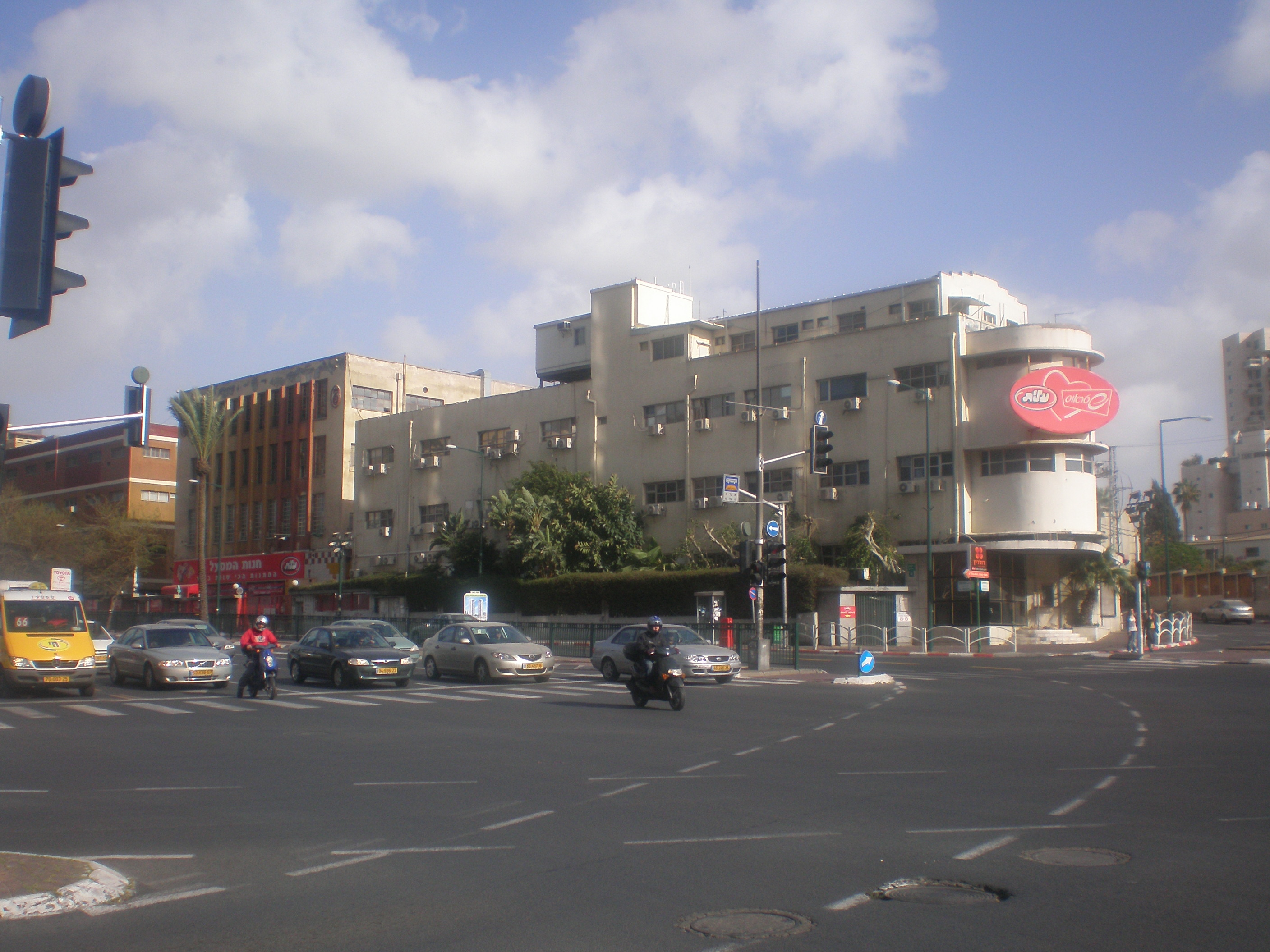
The front of the Elite chocolate factory in 2007 prior to its demolition

Despite this, the factory in Ramat Gan still remained a local landmark, as well as the namesake for the junction on which it sat, Elite Junction (Hebrew: צומת עלית). The factory was even the subject of a song in the famous Israeli children's album HaKeves HaShisha Asar, released in 1978.

Strauss Group acquired Elite in 1997, later merging to become Strauss-Elite, making it the 2nd biggest producer of food in Israel.

In 2003, Strauss-Elite removed all industrial production from the factory in Ramat Gan in anticipation of selling the property, using the it in the meantime for the company's headquarter offices. Strauss-Elite sold the site of the chocolate factory in 2005, and most of the factory would be demolished in 2008.

=== Proposed Skyscrapers ===
Initially, the site was supposed to be sold to Eli Weinstein and Issac Katan, who had made a $1 million down payment. But upon attempting to make a further payment of $2.5 million, Elite informed them that the deal had been voided due to Weinstein and Katan's failure to make the required payments. The site was instead sold to the Trump Organization and Crescent Heights, who offered a similar price. A large part of the site was first sold to them in 2005 for $35.2 million, then the rest was sold to them in 2006 for $8.8 million, totaling $44 million overall.

Plans then began for a $300 million skyscraper at the site named Trump Tower—a luxury 70-story apartment building which would have been tallest building in Israel at the time. However, plans for Trump Tower were shelved in 2007 when the site was sold for $80 million to Israeli construction company Azorim and other private investors.

Azorim planned to build a $175 million, 74-floor skyscraper which also would have been the tallest building in Israel at the time at 270 m (890 ft). The tower was planned to have 72,000 m^{2} (780,000 sq ft) of residential, office, and hotel space.

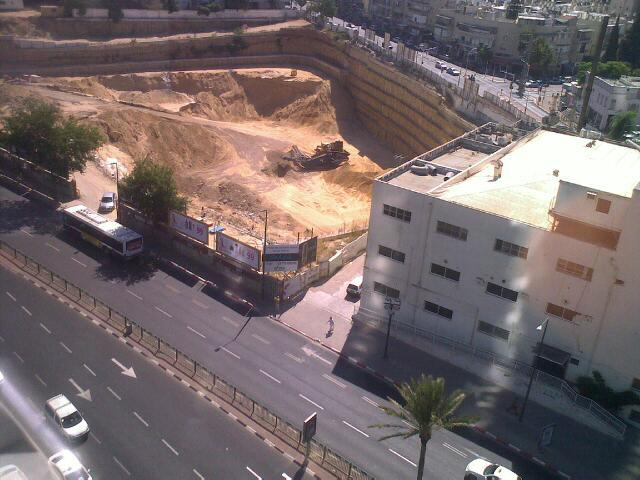
The site in 2011

Work on the building was frozen as a result of the 2008 financial crisis, with Azorim affirming that they are reexamining the ratio of apartments to offices in the tower due to the low demand for offices at that time. Planning for the building was resumed in late 2009.

By early 2014, plans for the site had shifted to two separate towers: an all-residential building to be developed by Azorim, and an office building to be developed separately by the private investors. Azorim announced that the all-residential skyscraper would have a height of 265 m (869 ft), which would still make it the tallest in building Israel at the time, with a total of 65 stories and 338 residential units as well as a lounge that is accessible to all of the building's residents. On the top floor, the architect said that there were plans for a viewing room with a cafe. Construction was expected to begin sometime in 2014 and be completed by 2017.

In early March 2015, Azorim announced that construction of the residential tower was canceled, after already selling almost a third of the apartments planned to be in the building. Insider sources revealed the source of the cancellation to be a delay in obtaining a permit from the Ramat Gan city council and new requirements for obtaining said permit, a problem other real estate developers also reportedly experienced. According to the insider sources, the contracts for the apartments stipulated that if a permit had not been received within 18 months of signing, Azorim would have to refund buyers their down payment back plus indexation and interest. Since the 18 months were nearly over at that time, Azorim offered the buyers either a refund of their 7% down payment, or alternatively purchasing an apartment in one of their other projects on favorable terms and at a discount. However, some sources from the city hinted at possibility of Azorim's decision actually being because they had only sold 100 units out of the planned 338, and that Azorim may simply be trying to buy their way out of the plan, also claiming that the company didn't even complete all that was required of it to receive the permit. Azorim denied these allegations, saying the 100 sales were done via word of mouth and that the project was still projected to be profitable, thus there was no desire to cancel it as far as the company was concerned. In response, Ramat Gan city council later stated that after checking with the CEO of Azorim, the company had no intentions of cancelling the project.

=== Construction ===
In August 2016, the district committee approved a plan to construct a complex that included a 60-story tall residential building to be developed by Azorim and a 45-story tall office building to be developed by the private investors, which was later changed to 50 stories tall after the private investors sold it to the Israeli insurance company Migdal for ₪325 million. The buildings were to have their bottom 2 floors be dedicated to commercial space, and both buildings would share an underground parking lot. Adjacent to these two buildings, Maslavi Construction had already constructed a 30-story tall residential tower with 153 residential units called Elite Tower, a name previously used for Azorim's planned skyscraper.

In July 2020, the casting of the foundations was completed and construction of the towers had officially begun.

Near the end of 2023, both towers had ben topped off, making the residential tower the second tallest building in Ramat Gan as well as the second tallest residential building in Israel (after the Hi Tower in Givatayim).

In June 2025, the buildings sustained damage from a nearby Iranian ballistic missile strike, however the brunt of the explosion was absorbed by the aforementioned Elite Tower. Azorim stated that "The residential tower [of Exchange Ramat Gan] was not hit directly. An initial inspection of the site revealed that secondary damage has occurred as a result of the shockwave, which caused localized damage primarily in the aluminium and glass of the building's facade."

== See also ==
- Diamond Exchange District
- Moshe Aviv Tower
- List of tallest buildings in Israel
- Architecture of Israel
