= Amnon Niv =

Amnon Niv (Hebrew: אמנון ניב; February 23, 1930 – June 6, 2011) was an Israeli architect and urban designer. Niv was the chief architect for the Negev Nuclear Research Center and the City Engineer of Jerusalem. Together with Amnon Schwartz, he designed the Moshe Aviv Tower, which was the tallest building in Israel between 2001 and 2017.

== Biography ==
Amnon Niv was born in Haifa. He studied architecture at the Technion – Israel Institute of Technology, graduating in 1955. In 1958–1963, he served as the chief architect for the Nuclear Research center in the Negev. In the late 1960s, he collaborated with architect Rafael Raifer on the design of the Manshiya industrial quarter in Tel Aviv. The plan was partially completed. His design of the Etzel Museum together with architect Amnon Schwartz won the Rokach Prize.

== Architecture career ==
In 1977, Teddy Kollek, then mayor of Jerusalem, appointed Niv as the City Engineer of Jerusalem. To design the new municipality complex, Niv created a 3D model of Jerusalem which is still in use. In 1988, Niv returned to private practice and specialized in skyscrapers. Moshe Aviv Tower, Israel's tallest building, was a collaboration of Niv and Schwartz.

== See also ==
- Architecture in Israel
