= Moshe Aviv Tower =

Office & residential skyscraper in Ramat Gan, Israel

- מִגְדָּל מֹשֶׁה אָבִיב
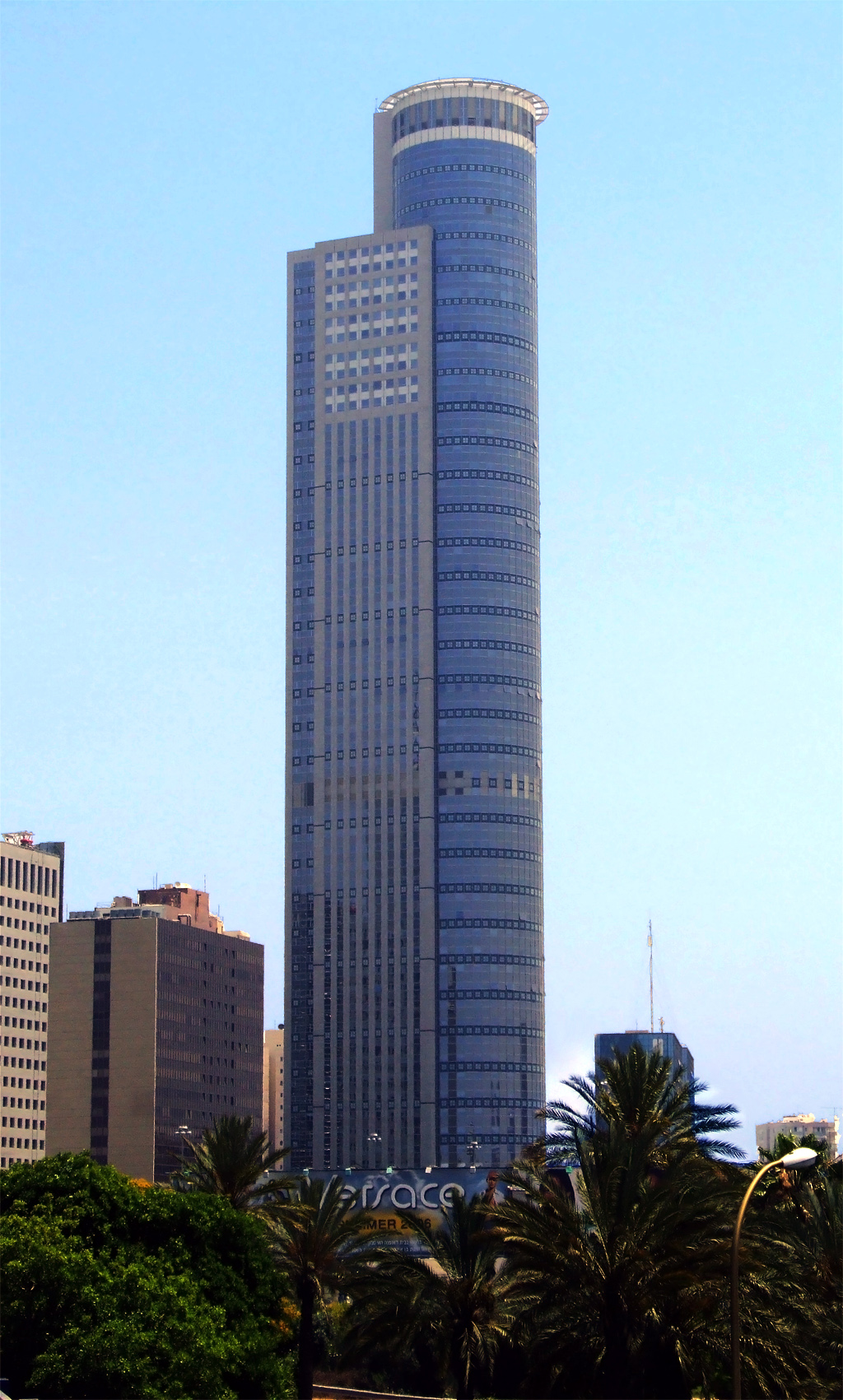
- City Gate
- Interactive map of the Moshe Aviv Tower area

General information
- Status: Completed
- Type: Business, Residential
- Location: Ramat Gan, Tel Aviv District, Israel
- Coordinates: 32°05′00″N 34°48′14″E
- Construction started: 1998
- Estimated completion: 2001
- Opening: 2003
- Cost: US $133 million

Height
- Antenna spire: 235 m (771 ft)
- Roof: 235 m (771 ft)
- Top floor: 233 m (764 ft)

Technical details
- Floor count: 68 + 6 below ground

Design and construction
- Architect: AMAV Architects

Moshe Aviv Tower (Hebrew: מִגְדָּל מֹשֶׁה אָבִיב) is a 235-metre-tall (771 ft) skyscraper located in the demarcated area of the Diamond Exchange District (Israel Diamond Exchange) on Jabotinsky Road (No. 7) in the Tel Aviv District city of Ramat Gan, Israel. The 68-story building is commonly known as City Gate (Hebrew: שער העיר), its original name. It is the fourth tallest building in Israel, following Tel Aviv's 238-meter-high (781 ft) Azrieli Sarona Tower.

== Background ==
The building was designed by architects Amnon Niv and Amnon Schwartz. It was named after Moshe Aviv, the owner of the construction company, who died in an accident in October 2001, before its completion.

== Construction ==
The design for City Gate was inspired by the famous Westend Tower in Frankfurt. Construction on the tower began in 1998 and was completed in 2003 when the tower became occupied. The construction period was extremely short, achieving a growth rate of five stories per month with only a single shift of 40 workers. The rate of concrete placement per month was 3,000 m^{3} (3,900 cu yd) and on a typical floor there are 42 windows. Total cost of construction was US$133 million. The tower has a total of 180,000 m^{2} (1,900,000 sq ft) of space. The building appeared in a TV advertisement for the Mifal HaPayis national lottery before it was completed, in December 2002. When completed it was the most expensive single building in Israel.

An adjacent 2-tower complex, known as Exchange Ramat Gan, is located across Jabotinsky Road at the former site of the Elite Factory. Before the complex was built, the site was previously planned for a tower named the Elite Tower.

== Use ==
The Moshe Aviv Tower is a multi-use structure. The top 11 floors consist of 17,000 m^{2} (180,000 sq ft) of residential space divided among 98 apartments. Below that, the bulk of the tower contains 63,000 m^{2} (680,000 sq ft) of office space. Separate lobbies and elevators serve the residential and office sections. 1,200 m^{2} (13,000 sq ft) of commercial space occupies the lower floors. There is a synagogue on the third floor for residents, office tenants and visitors. The rooftop of the cylinder part serves as an emergency helipad. The tower also boasts an exclusive fitness club and swimming pool situated on the tower's carpark annex roof.

On September 27, 2004, as part of the annual global City in Pink lighting campaign for breast cancer, the building was lit completely in bright pink light.

== Gallery ==
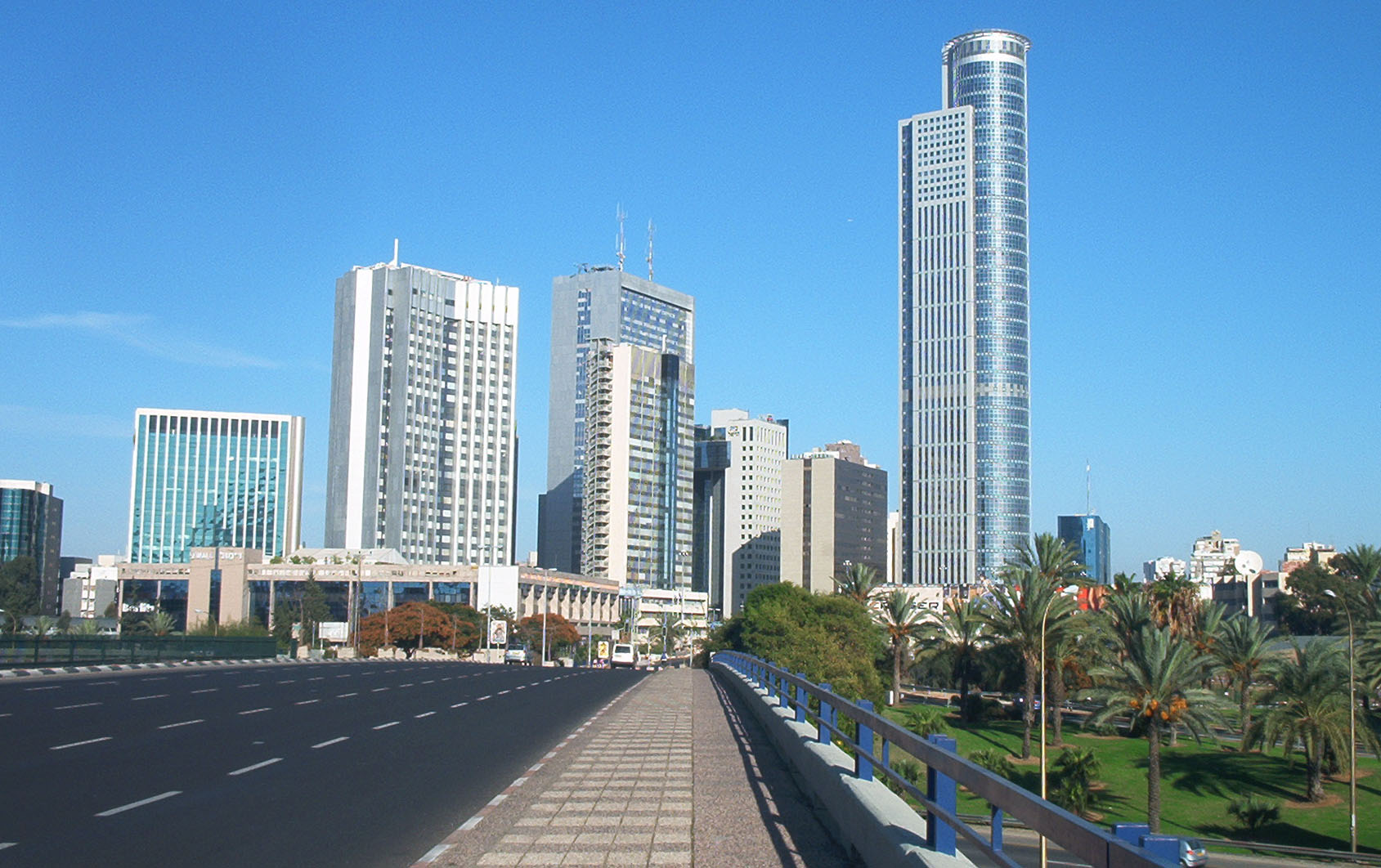
The Tower as seen from the west

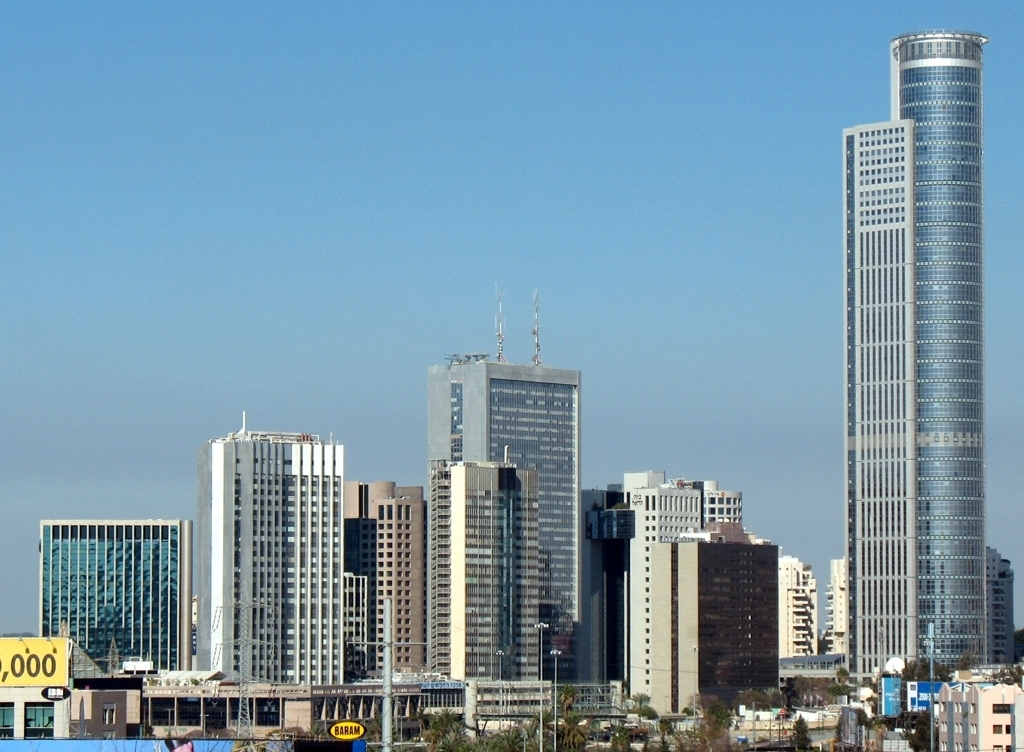
Ramat Gan with the tower to the right

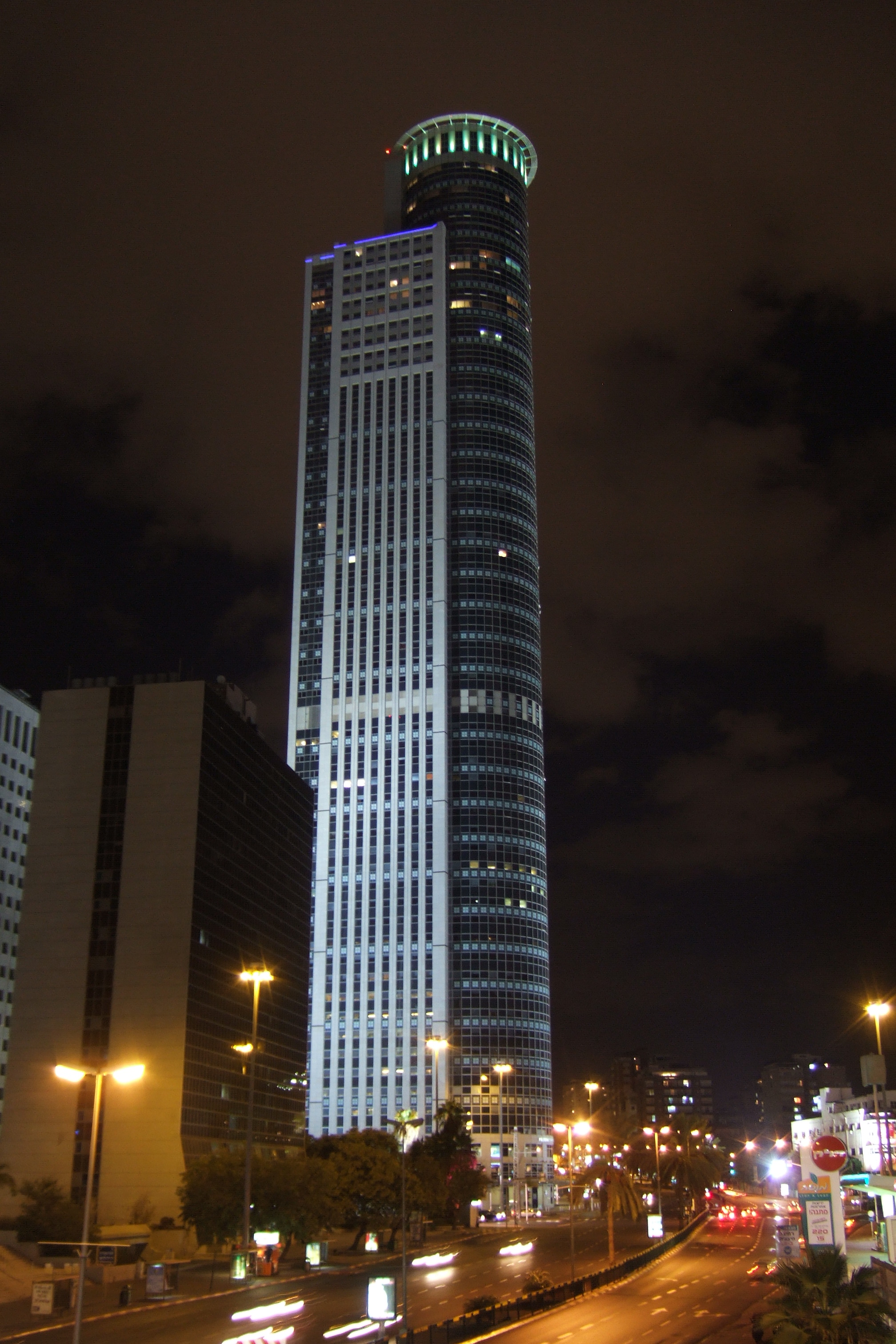
The Tower at night

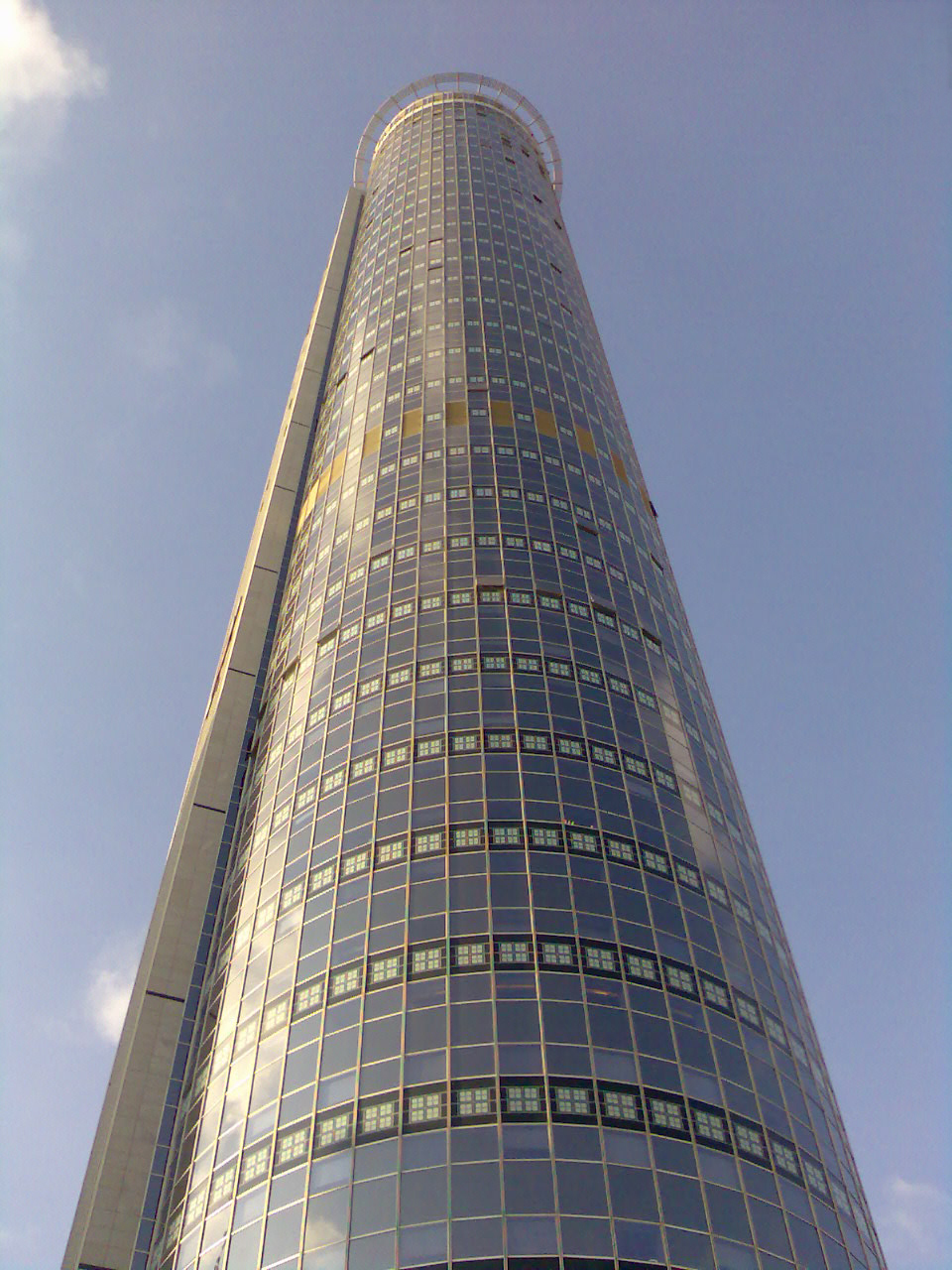
Moshe Aviv Tower

== See also ==
- List of skyscrapers in Israel
- List of tallest buildings in the world
- Architecture in Israel

Records
Preceded by Azrieli Center Circular Tower	Tallest building in Israel; 2001–2017; 235 metres (771 ft)	Succeeded by Azrieli Sarona Tower
