= Architecture of Israel =

The architecture of Israel has been influenced by the different architectural styles of those who have inhabited the country over time, sometimes modified to suit the local climate and landscape. Byzantine churches, Crusader castles, Islamic madrasas, Templer houses, Arab arches and minarets, Russian Orthodox onion domes, International Style modernist buildings, sculptural concrete Brutalist architecture, and glass-sided skyscrapers all are part of the architecture of Israel.

== History ==
=== Early period ===
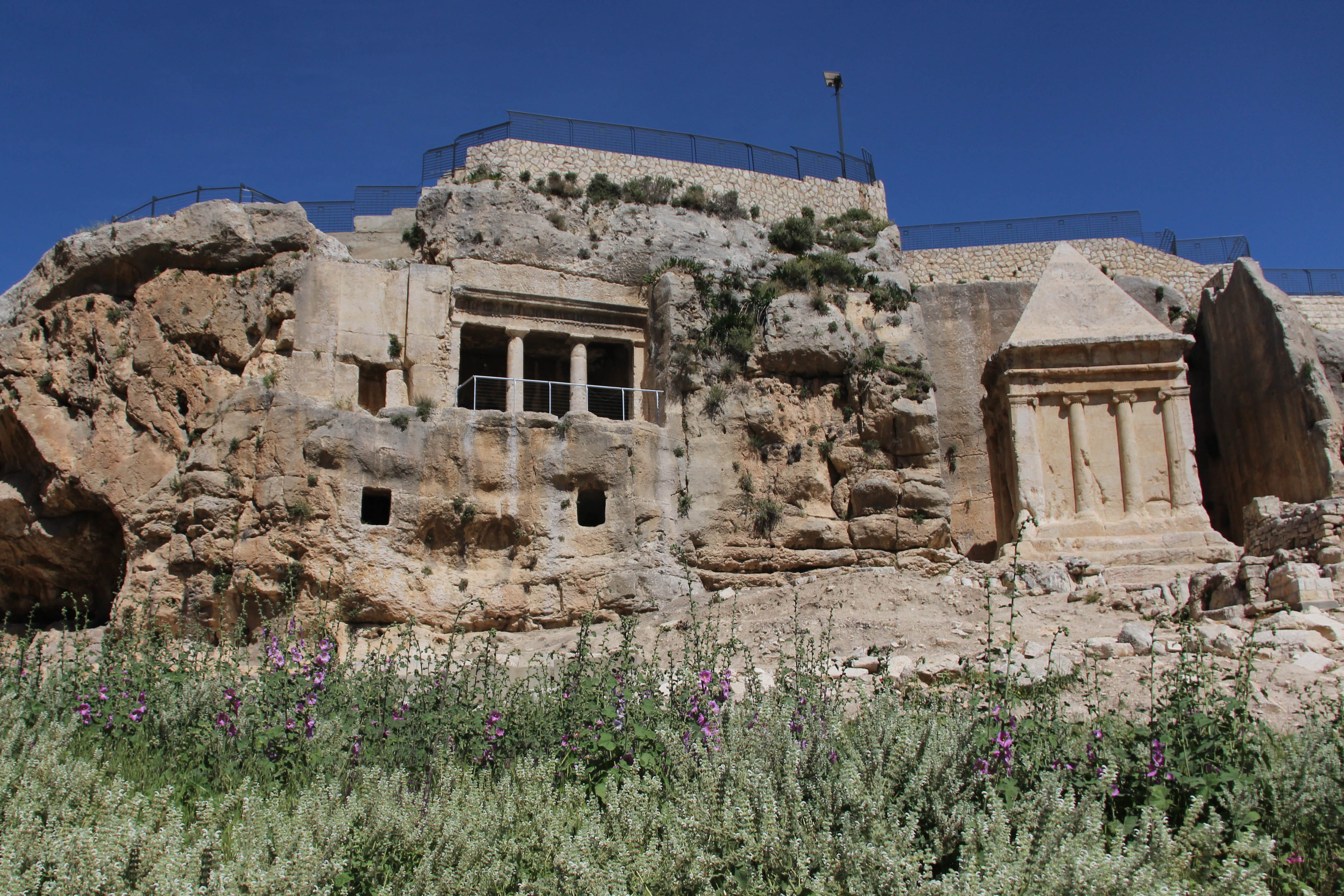
Bnei Hazir tomb and Tomb of Zechariah

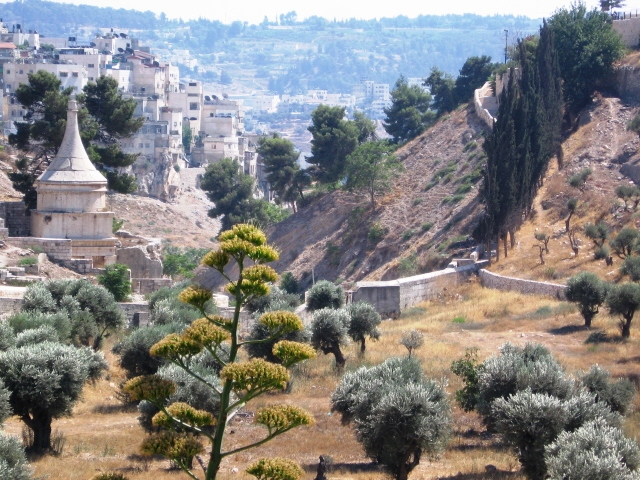
Tomb of Avshalom

Ancient regional architecture can be divided into two phases based on building materials—stone and sundried mud brick. Most of the stones used were limestone.

After the Hellenistic period, hard limestone was used for columns, capitals, bases or also the Herodian enclosure walls of the Temple Mount. In the north of the country, basalt was used for building stone, door sockets, door pivots but also for drainage. Fieldstone were placed randomly or laid in courses as well as for polygonal structures, for example it is found in city walls. Rough-hewn Stones and ashlars were used for more complex structure, and they were extracted from quarries. Huge stones were used since the first century B.C. Stone dressing was primarily done with the chisel and the hammer.

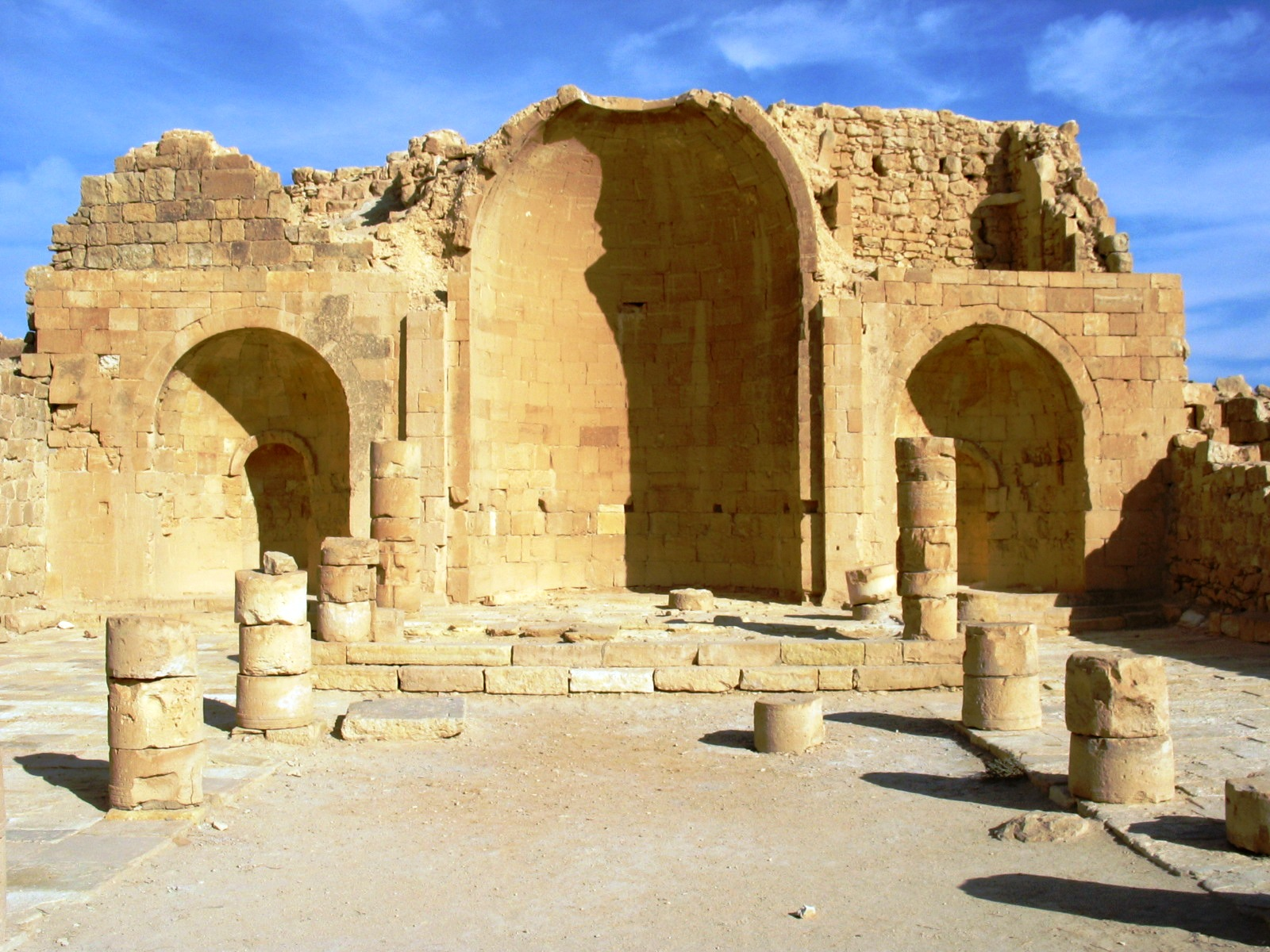
Byzantine basilica (Southern Church), Shivta, Negev desert

Sundried mud bricks were the most used material until modern times, particularly in the coastal plain and valleys. Structures were roofed with timber wooden beams covered by reeds and rushes.

=== Ottoman period ===
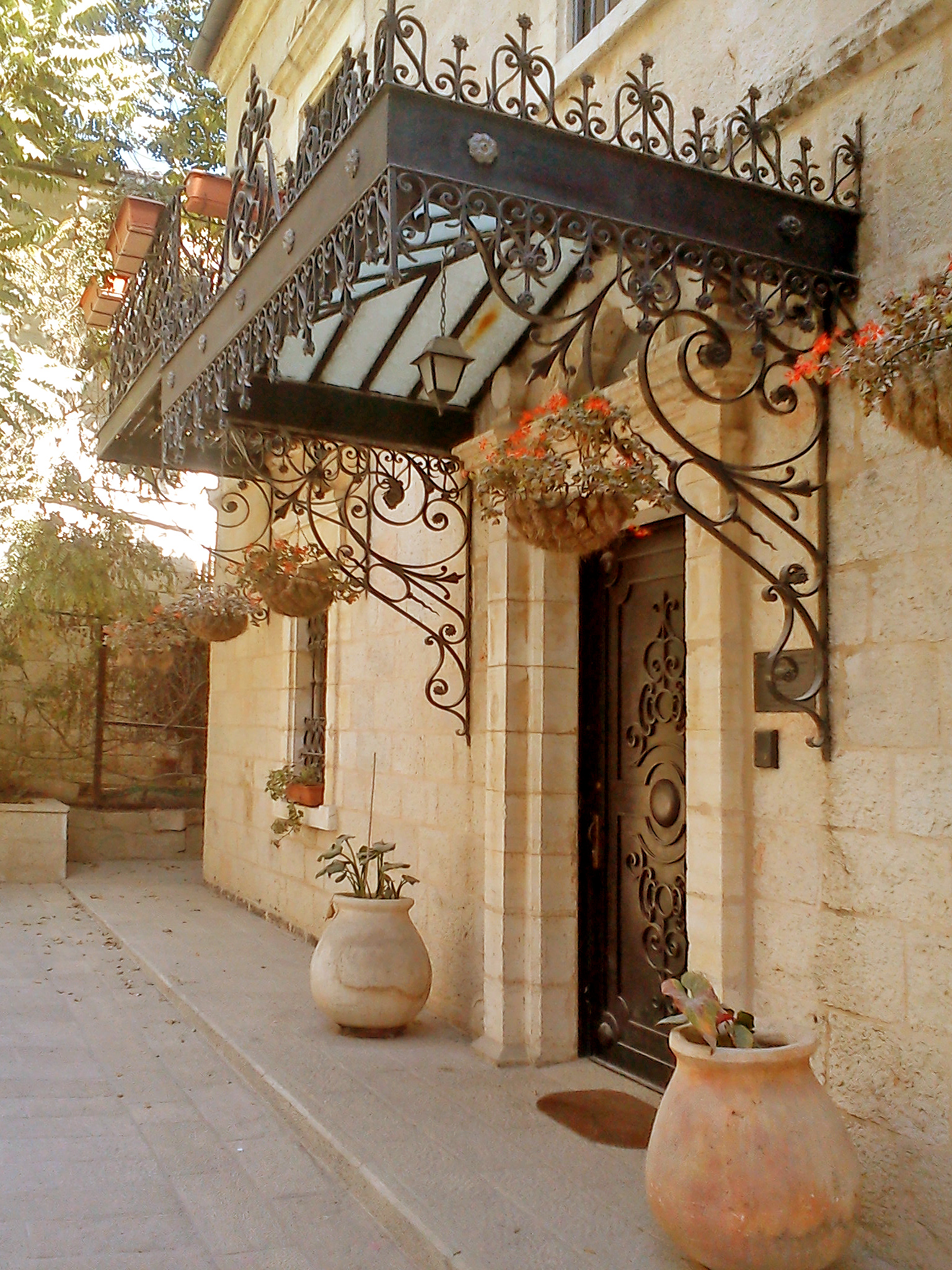
Jerusalem stone and metal grillwork

In Lifta, until the end of the 19th century, traditional housing construction consisted of a single room without partitions, divided into levels in accordance with various functions carried out in the house:

- Rawiyeh – a bottom level at the elevation of the courtyard considered the "dirty" part of the house, used for storage and sheltering livestock.
- Mastabeh – A higher residential level used for sleeping, eating, hospitality and storage.
- Sida (gallery) – Another living area above the mastaba, used primarily for sleeping.

In the second half of the 19th century, a residential story characterized by a cross-vault was added above the traditional house, creating a space between the floor with the livestock in the bottom room and the residential story. A separate entrance was installed in each story.

Fortified houses were built outside the village core and had two stories: a raised ground floor with tiny windows used for raising livestock and storage, and a separate residential floor with large windows and balconies. In the courtyard was a small structure used for storage. Sometimes a tabun baking oven would be located inside it.

The first modern building technology was evident in the farmhouses. Iron beams were used and the roofs were made of concrete and roof tiles. These structures had balconies with a view and wide doorways.

== Modern architecture and town planning ==
=== Notable architects since WWI ===
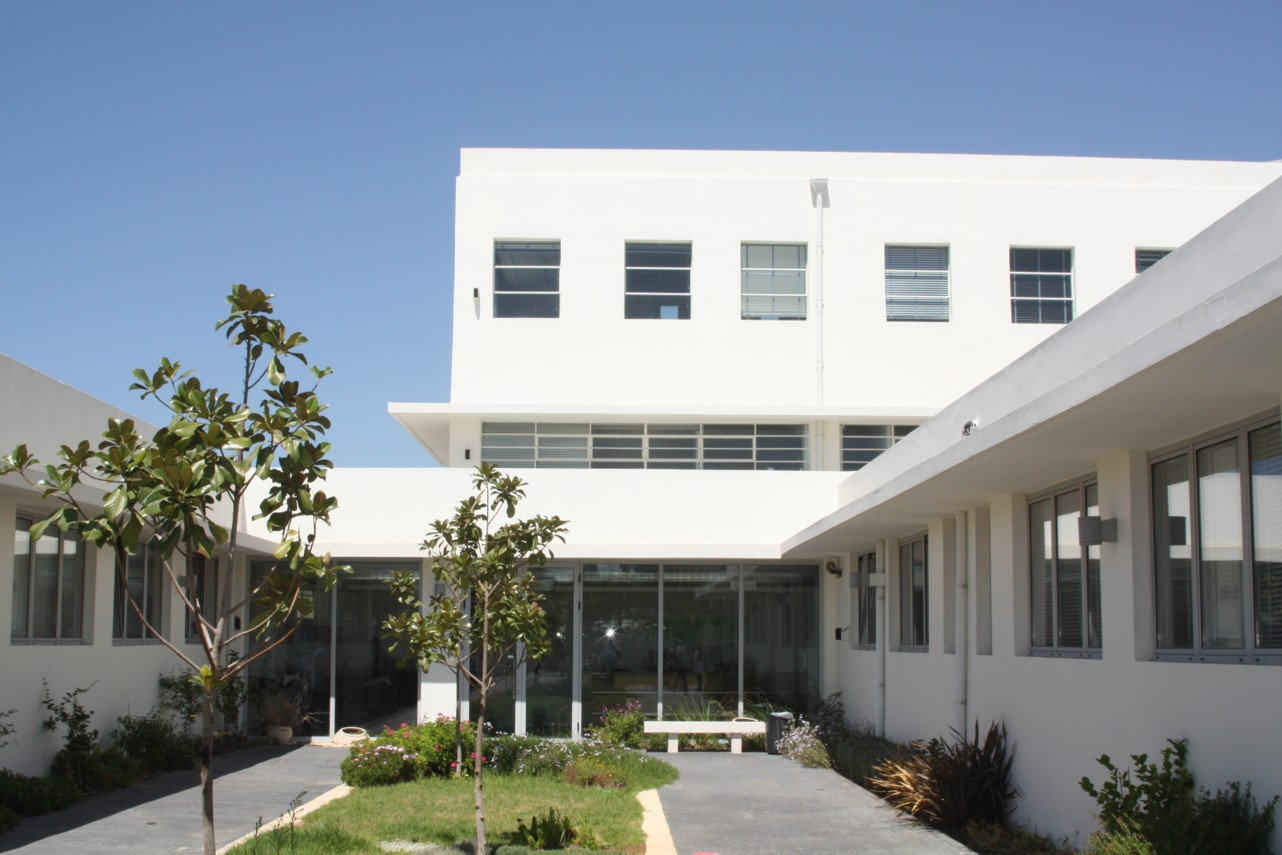
Government Mint building, Jerusalem, designed by Austen Harrison (1935), built 1937

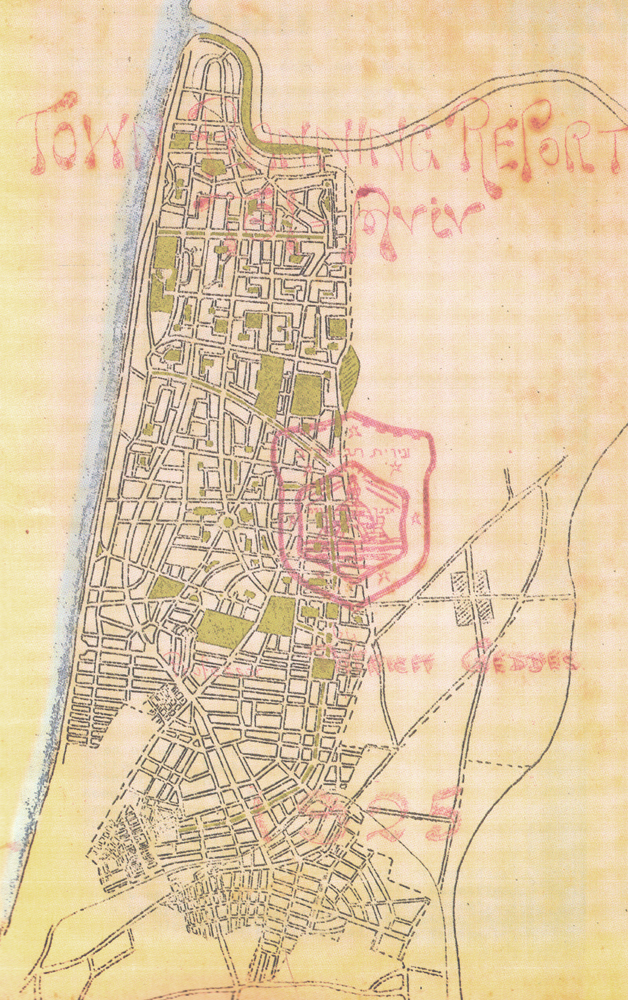
Geddes plan for Tel Aviv, 1925

Sensing the political changes taking place in central Europe around the time of the First World War, as well as the stirrings of Zionist ideals about the re-establishment of a homeland for Jews, numerous Jewish architects from around Europe emigrated to Palestine during the first three decades of the 20th century. Much innovative planning occurred during the time of the British Mandatory authorities, 1920–1948 – especially the 1925 Tel Aviv town plan by Patrick Geddes. Tel Aviv was later designated a UNESCO World Heritage site because it is the worlds largest collection of Bauhaus style buildings. Among the architects who emigrated to Palestine at that time, and who went on to establish formidable careers were: Yehuda Magidovitch, Shmuel Mestechkin (1908–2004; specialised in kibbutz architecture), Lucjan Korngold (1897–1963; Poland and Brazil; the Rubinsky House, an early Le Corbusier-style building in Tel Aviv, is often misattributed to him), Jacob (Jacques, Jacov) Ornstein (1886–1953), Salomon Gepstein (1882–1961), Josef Neufeld (1899–1980), Moshe Czerner, and Elsa Gidoni (1899–1978; née Mandelstamm).

Anglo-Palestine Bank in Jerusalem, designed by Erich Mendelsohn

Eric Mendelson designed many famous buildings including the Weitzmann House, Hadassah Hospital on Mount Scopus, and the Anglo Palestine Bank in Jerusalem.

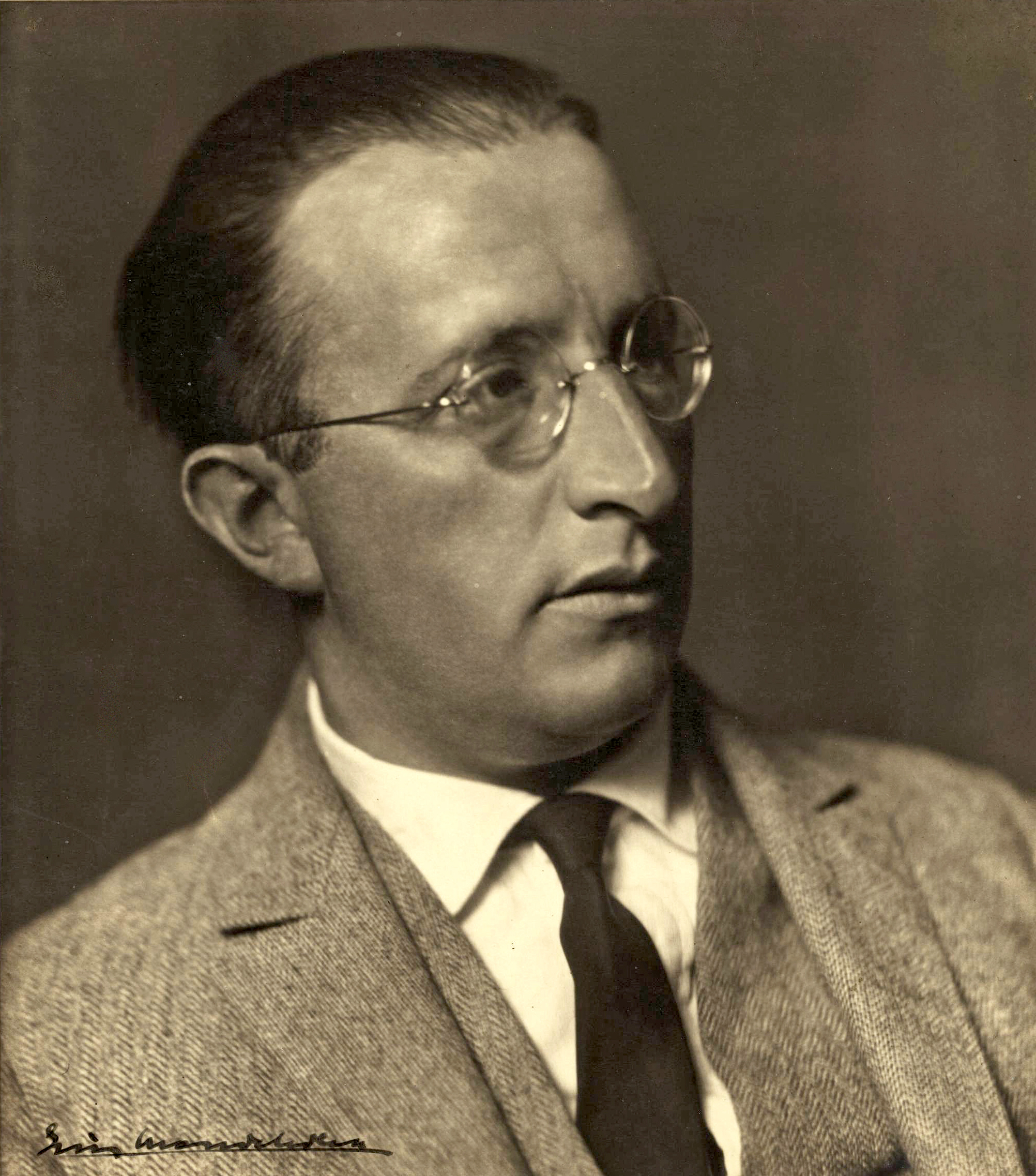
Erich Mendelsohn, father of expressionist architecture, lived and worked in Israel after fleeing Nazi Germany.

Dov Karmi, Zeev Rechter and Arieh Sharon were among the leading architects of the early 1950s. Rudolf (Reuven) Trostler played an important role in designing the country's early industrial buildings. Dora Gad designed the interiors of the Knesset, the Israel Museum, the country's first large hotels, the Jewish National and University Library, El Al planes and Zim passenger ships. Amnon Niv designed Moshe Aviv Tower, then Israel's tallest building (today it's the second tallest, after the Azrieli Sarona tower). David Resnick was a Brazilian-born Israeli architect who won the Israel Prize in architecture and the Rechter Prize for iconic Jerusalem buildings such as the Israel Goldstein Synagogue and Brigham Young University on Mount Scopus.

Moshe Safdie designed the Yad Vashem Holocaust History Museum, Ben Gurion International Airport among others.

=== Movie theaters ===
The architecture of Tel Aviv's movie theaters can be seen as a reflection of Israeli architectural history: The first cinema, the Eden, opened in 1914, was an example of the eclectic style that was in vogue at the time, combining European and Arab traditions. The Mugrabi cinema, designed in 1930, was built in art deco style. In the late 1930s, the Esther, Chen and Allenby theaters were prime examples of the Bauhaus style. In the 1950s and 1960s, brutalist style architecture was exemplified by the Tamar cinema built inside the historic Solel Boneh building on Tel Aviv's Allenby Street.

=== Late Ottoman period ===
The Templers built homes with tiled roofs like those in the German countryside.

=== Mandate period ===
Housing built during the British Mandate was urban in character, with flat roofs, rectangular doorways and painted floor tiles.

Municipal laws in Jerusalem require that all buildings be faced with local Jerusalem stone. The ordinance dates back to the British Mandate and the governorship of Sir Ronald Storrs and was part of a master plan for the city drawn up in 1918 by Sir William McLean, then city engineer of Alexandria.

Three of the six British town planners of the time were Charles Robert Ashbee, "the most pro-Arab and anti-Zionist" of them, Clifford Holliday and Austen Harrison, another important Mandate-time town planner being the German-Jewish architect Richard Kaufmann.

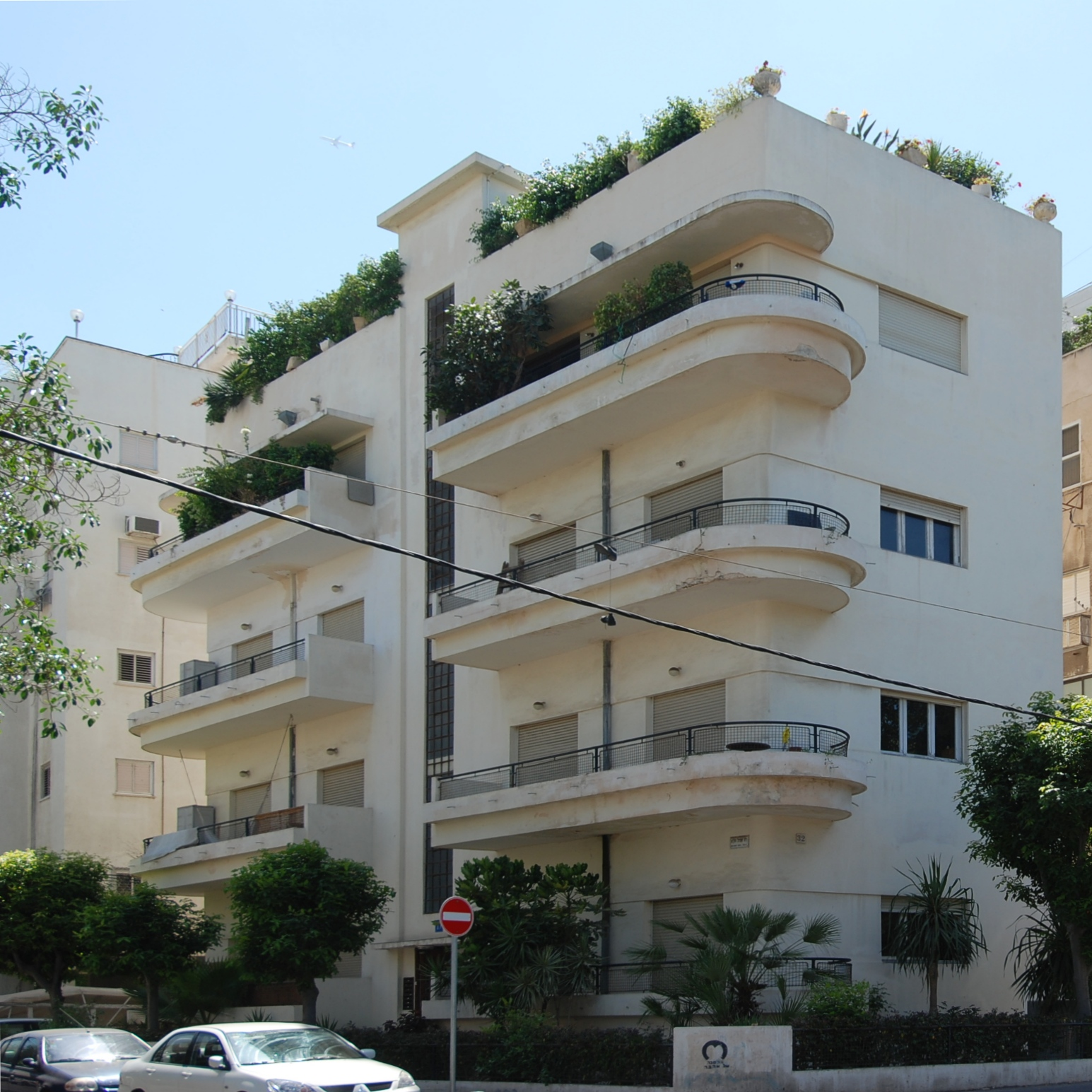
Classical International Style ("Bauhaus") architecture, part of the White City UNESCO World Heritage Site

The White City of Tel Aviv, a collection of over 4,000 buildings from the 1930s built in a locally adapted form of the International Style, has first been named the "White City" in 1984 and has been declared a UNESCO World Heritage Site in 2001. Tel Aviv has the highest concentration of international style architecture in the world.

=== State of Israel ===
In the 1950s and 1960s, Israel built rows of concrete tenements to accommodate the masses of new immigrants living in the temporary tents and tin shacks of the maabarot, some of these were known as "rakevet" or train in Hebrew due to their relative monotony and length. Many of these tenements can be seen today in cities and towns all over Israel.

From 1948, architecture in Israel was dominated by the need to house masses of new immigrants. The Brutalist concrete style suited Israel's harsh climate and paucity of natural building materials. Today, many such old buildings remain in Israeli cities. Although they are being gradually remodeled as part of the TAMA 38 program which is meant to strengthen old buildings against earthquakes or completely demolished and replaced with more modern housing projects occupying the former site as part of the "pinui binui" (evacuate and build) program, it is expected to take decades before this style of architecture completely disappears from Israel's cities.

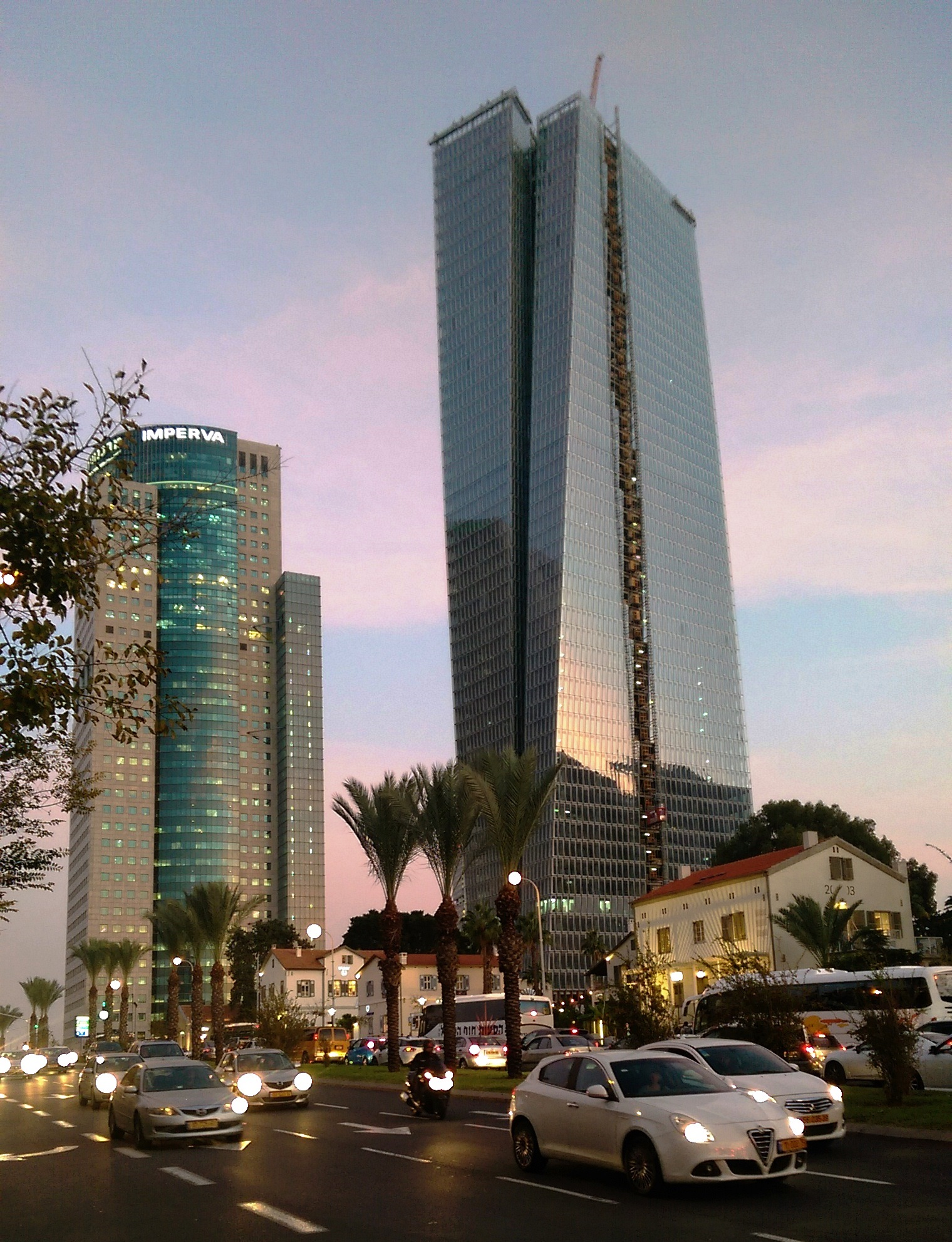
Azrieli Sarona Tower (finished 2017)

As property values have risen, skyscrapers are going up around the country. The Azrieli Sarona Tower in Tel Aviv is the tallest building in Israel to date.

Ephraim Henry Pavie has evolved from organic architecture towards biomorphism. The Pavie House in Neve Daniel is a rare case of non-geometric, Neo-futuristic blobitecture in Israel.

== Museums and archives ==
Tel Aviv has three institutions dedicated to the Bauhaus, or more widely, the International Style: the Bauhaus Center with its own gallery and offering guided city tours (see homepage here), the small Bauhaus Museum with original interior furnishings, established in 2008, and the Liebling Haus center for urbanism, architecture and conservation (see homepage here).

The Munio Gitai Weinraub Museum of Architecture opened in Haifa in 2012.

== Gallery ==
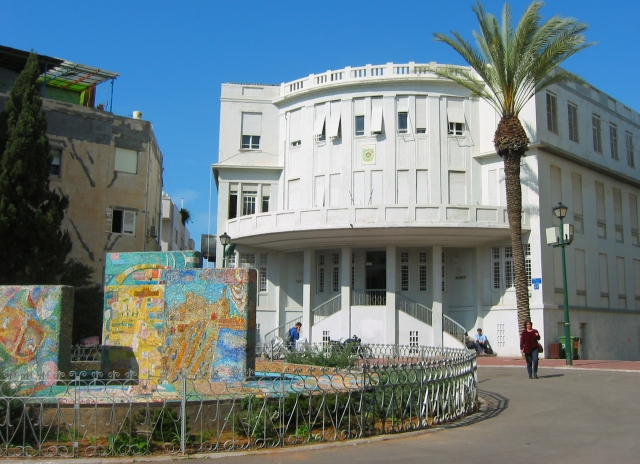
Old Town Hall – built 1925, archit. Moshe Czerner; Tel Aviv town hall 1928–1965; redesigned by archit. Mayra Kovalsky

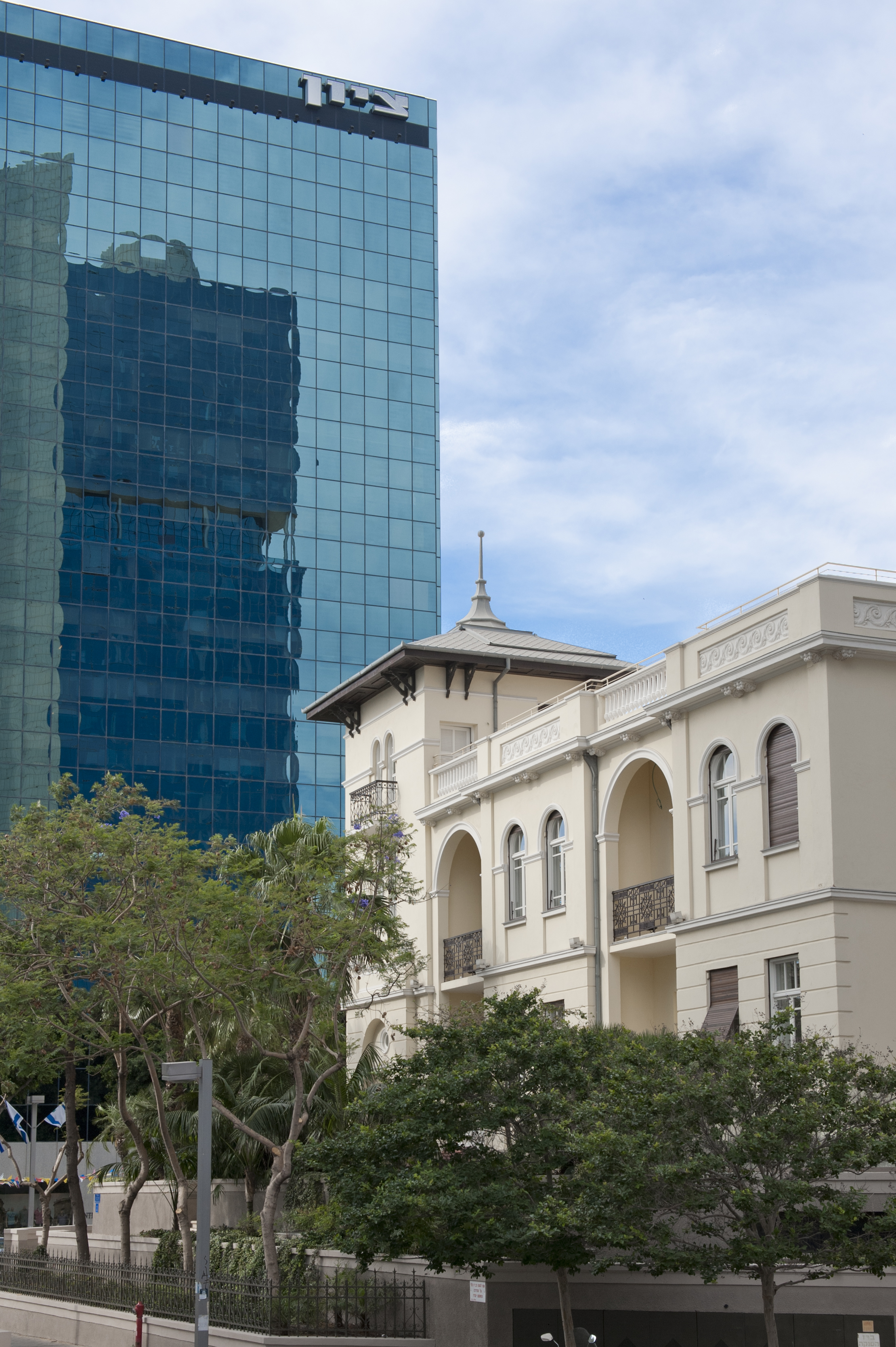
Levin House, 1924, on Rothschild Boulevard, flanked by modern glass tower

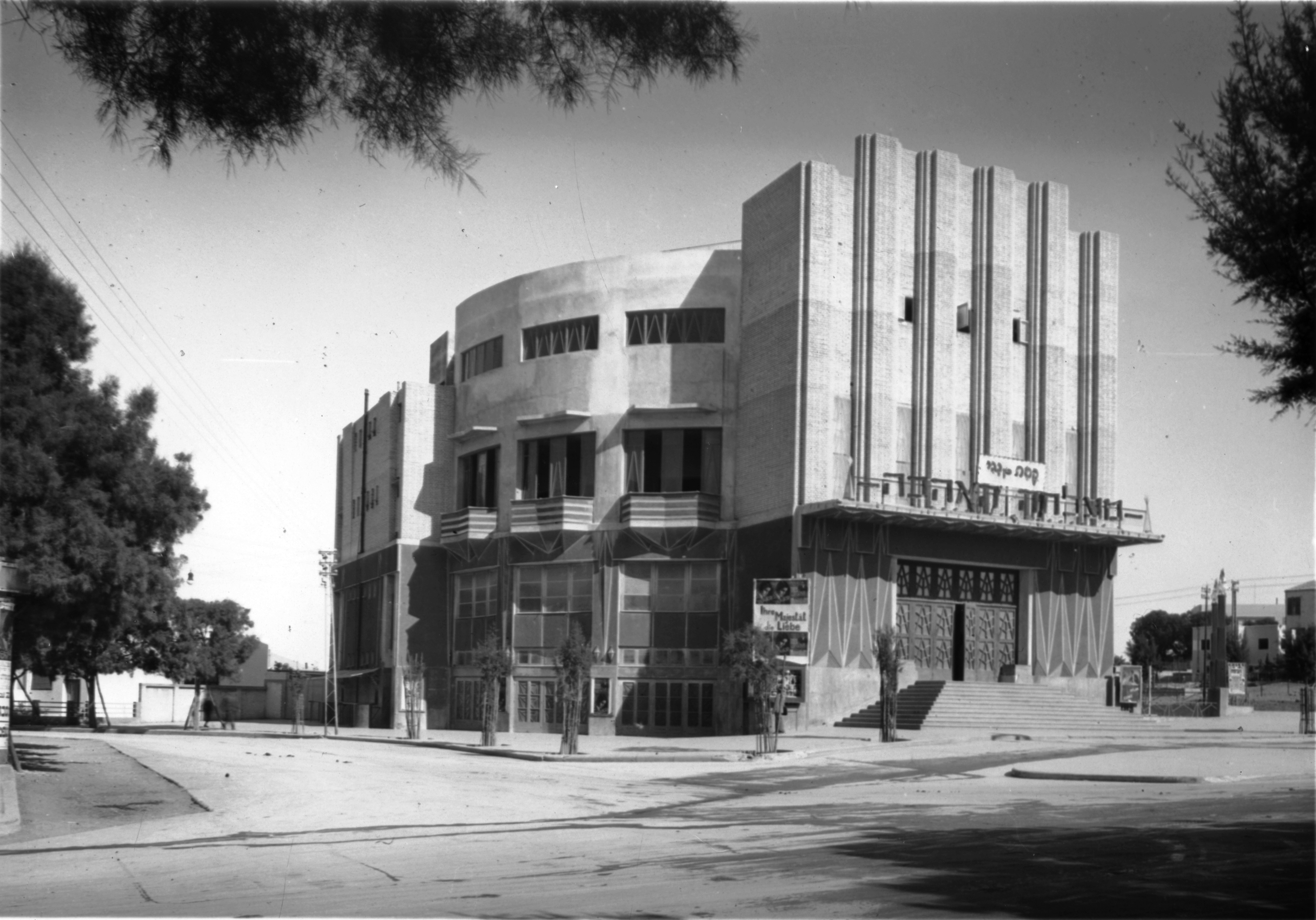
Mugrabi Cinema/Moghrabi Theatre, archit. Joseph Berlin, 1930 (gutted by fire in 1986, demolished in mid-90s), Tel Aviv

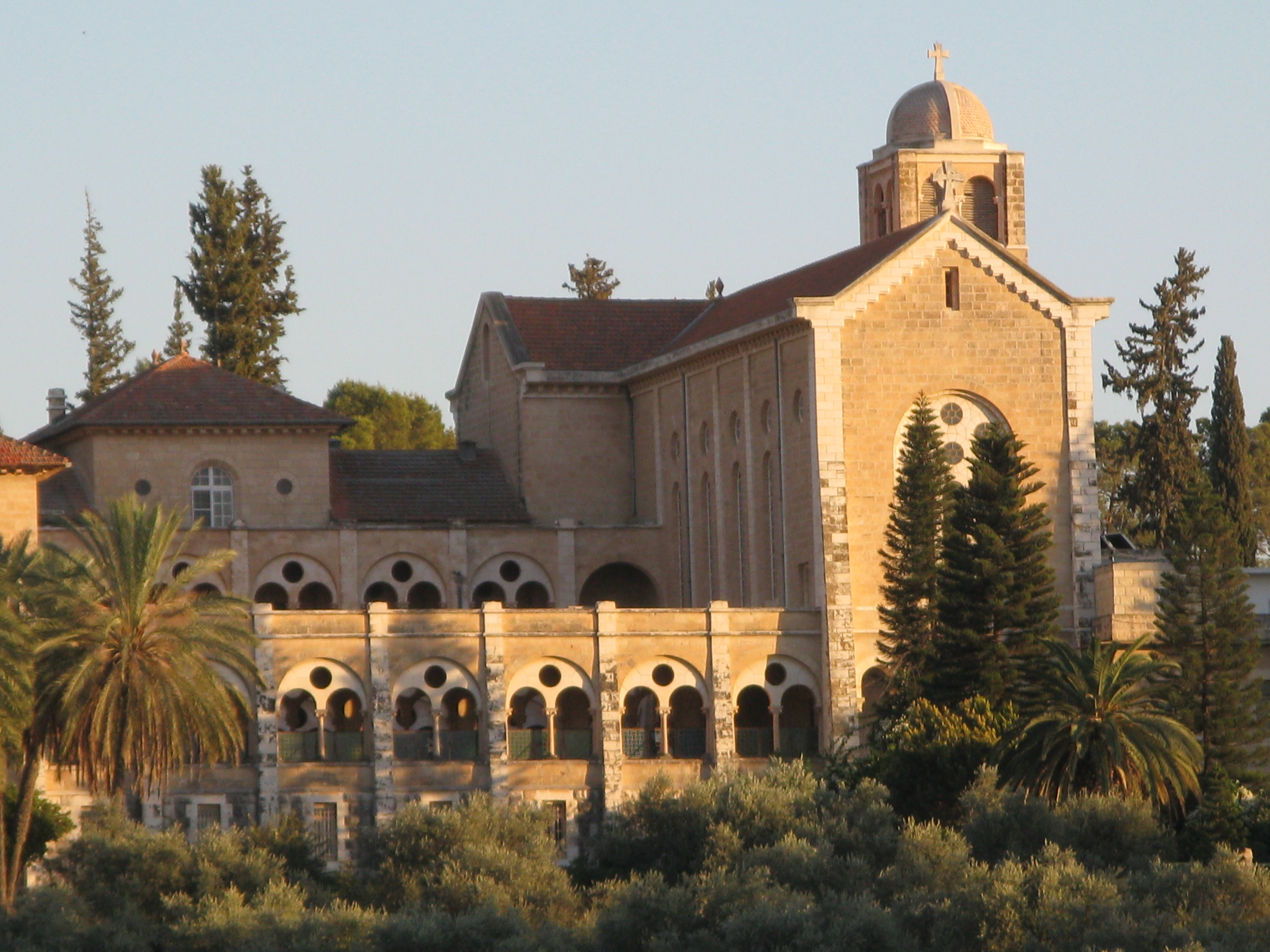
Latrun Abbey, built 1926–1953

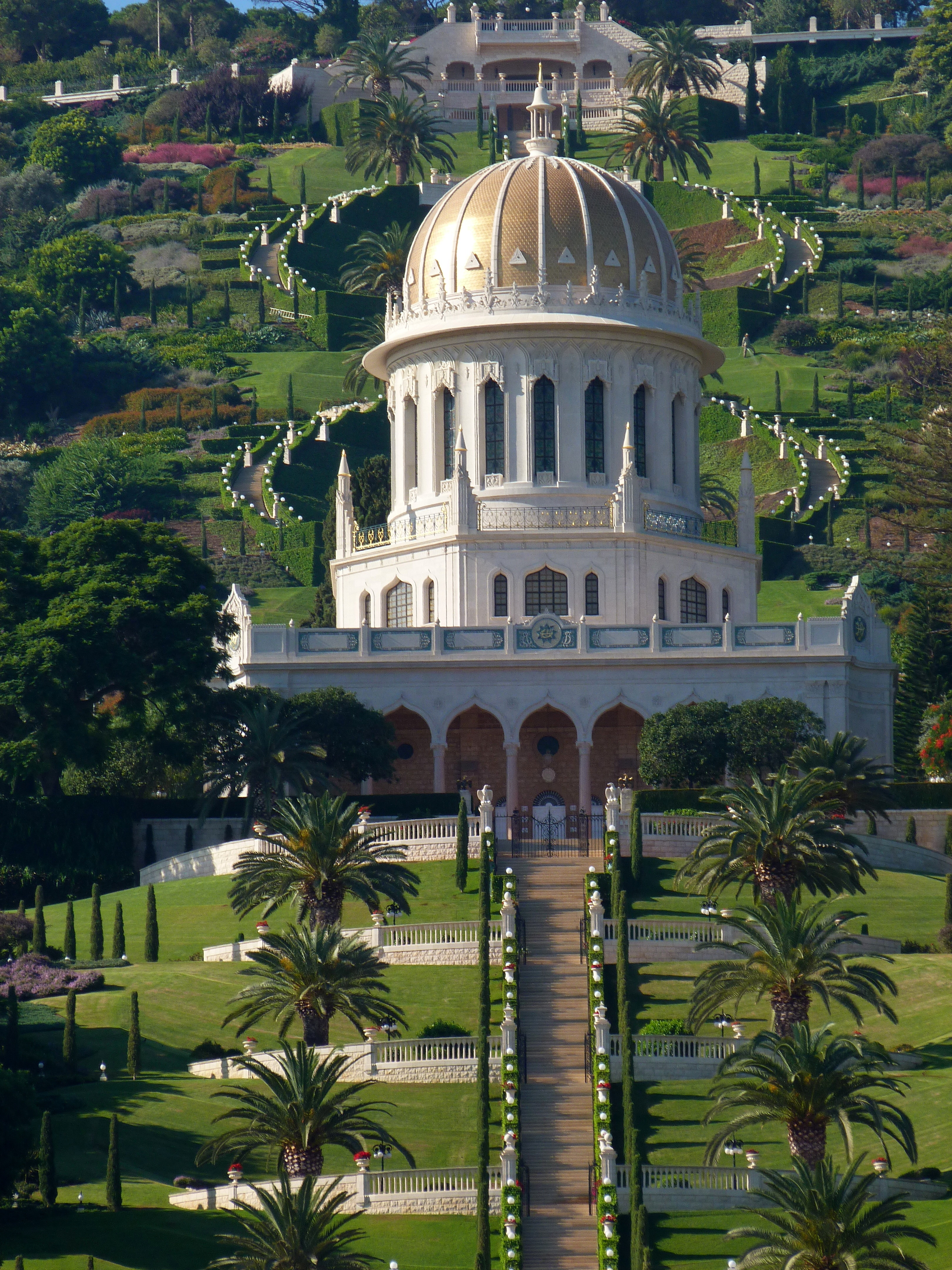
Shrine of the Báb, built 1949–1953, Haifa

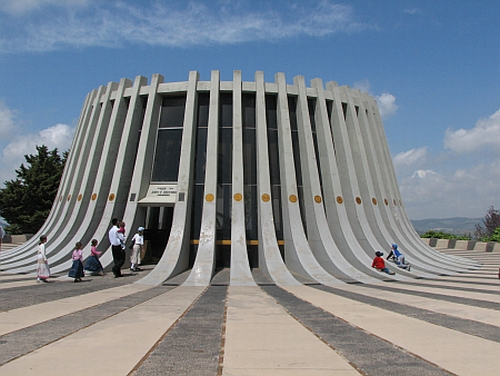
Yad Kennedy memorial, 1966, Jerusalem Forest

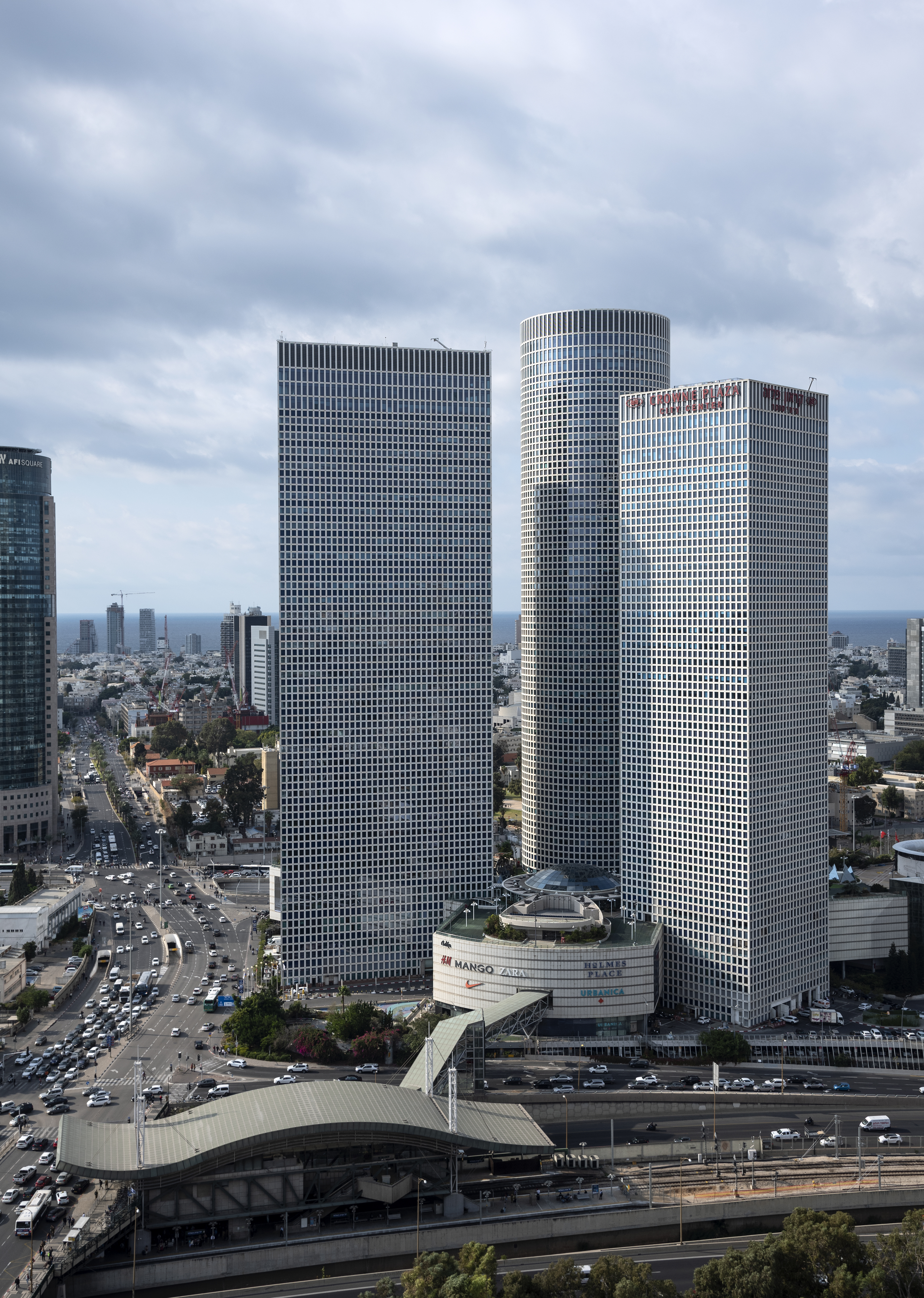
The three towers of the Azrieli Center, 1999

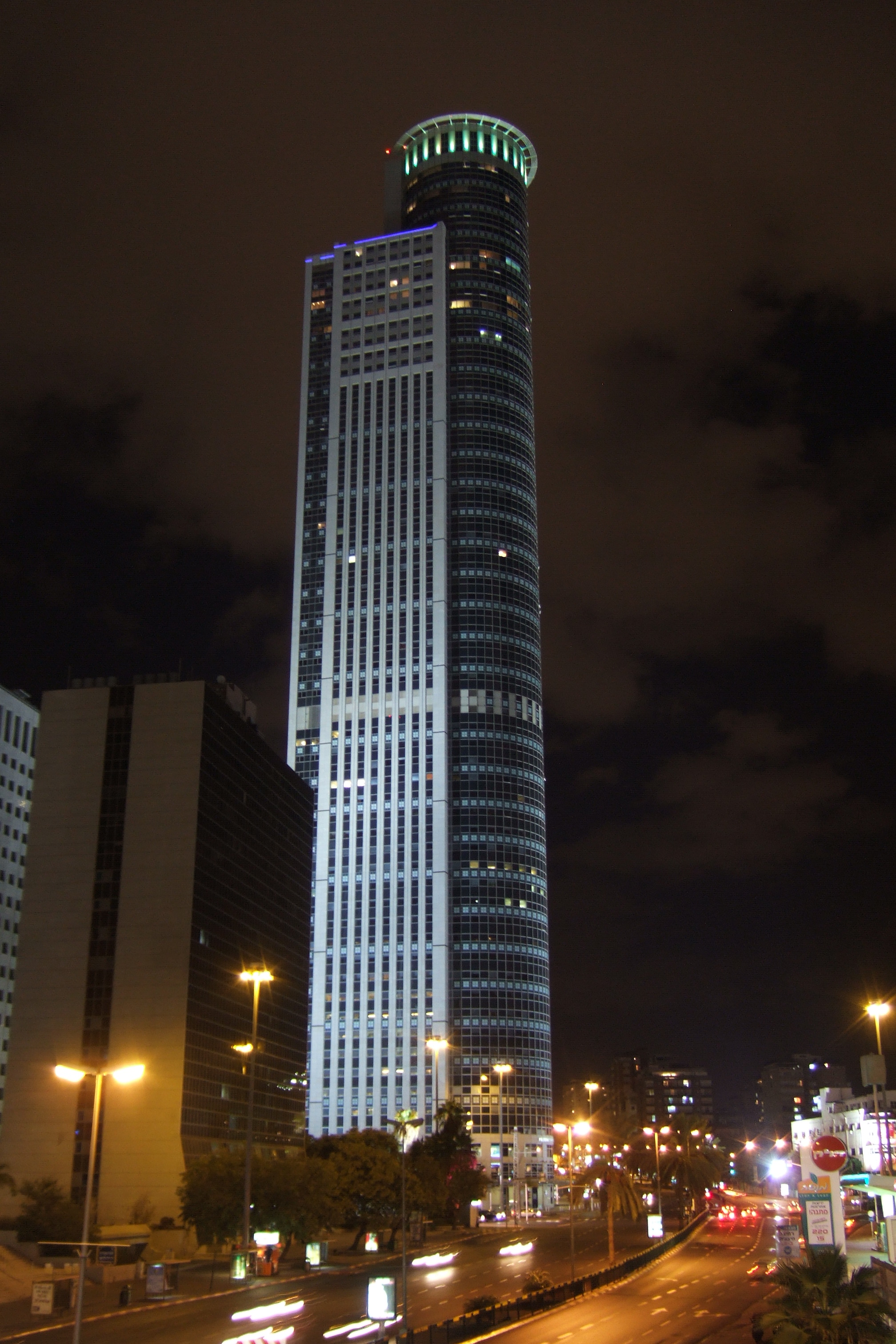
Moshe Aviv Tower, 2003, Ramat Gan

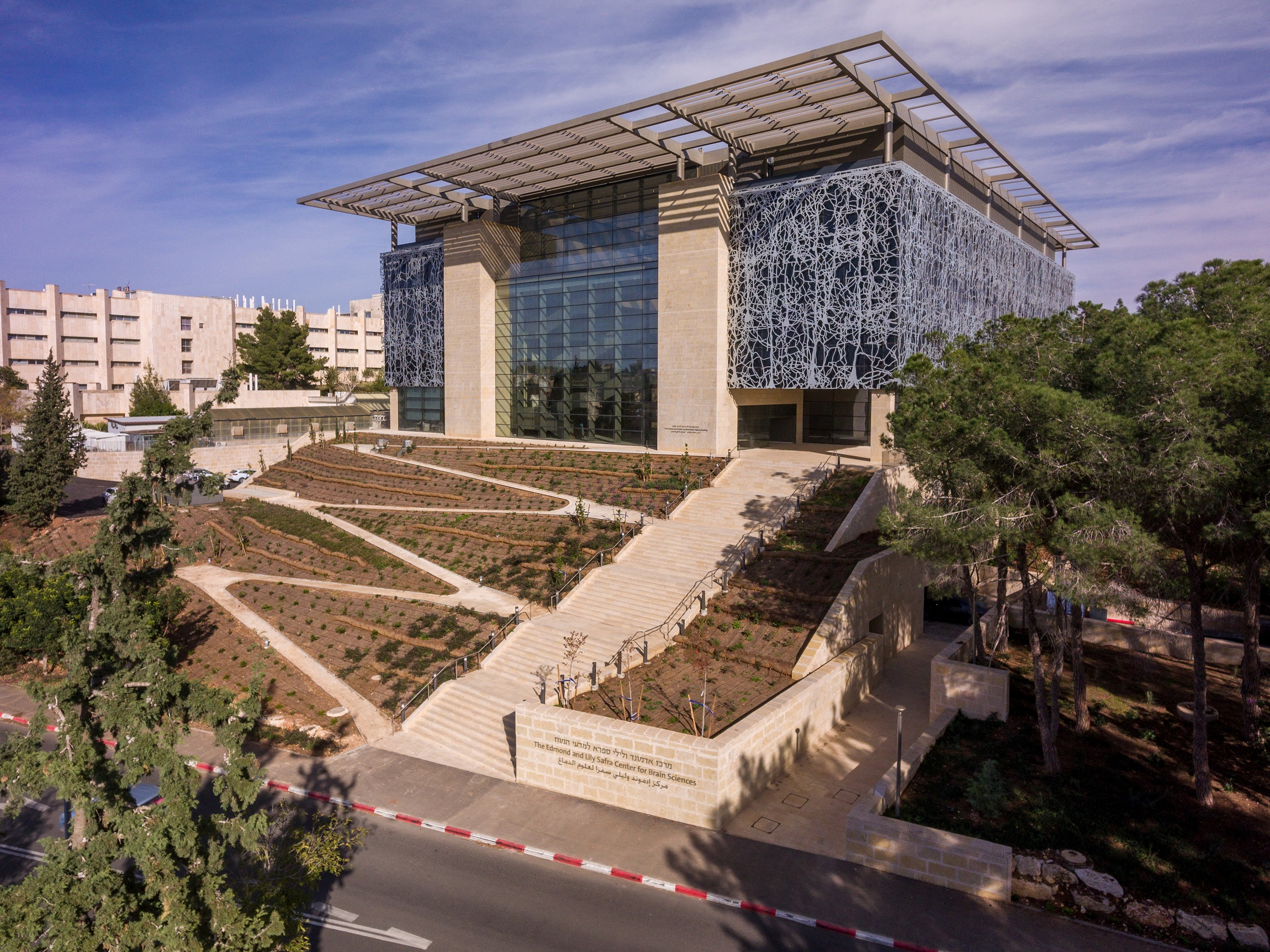
Edmond and Lily Safra Center for Brain Sciences, 2009

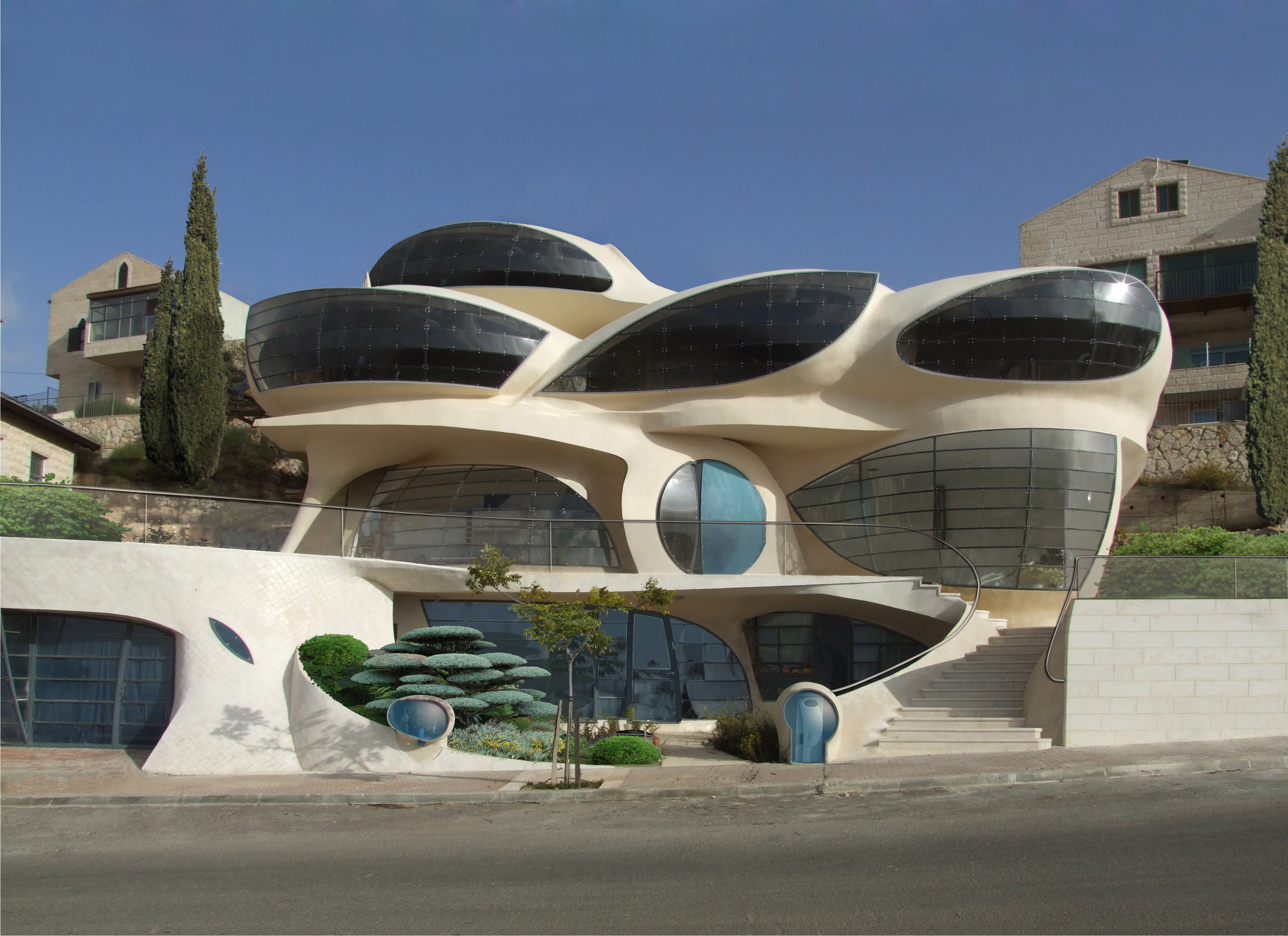
The Biomorphic House by Ephraim Henry Pavie, 2007–2014, Neve Daniel

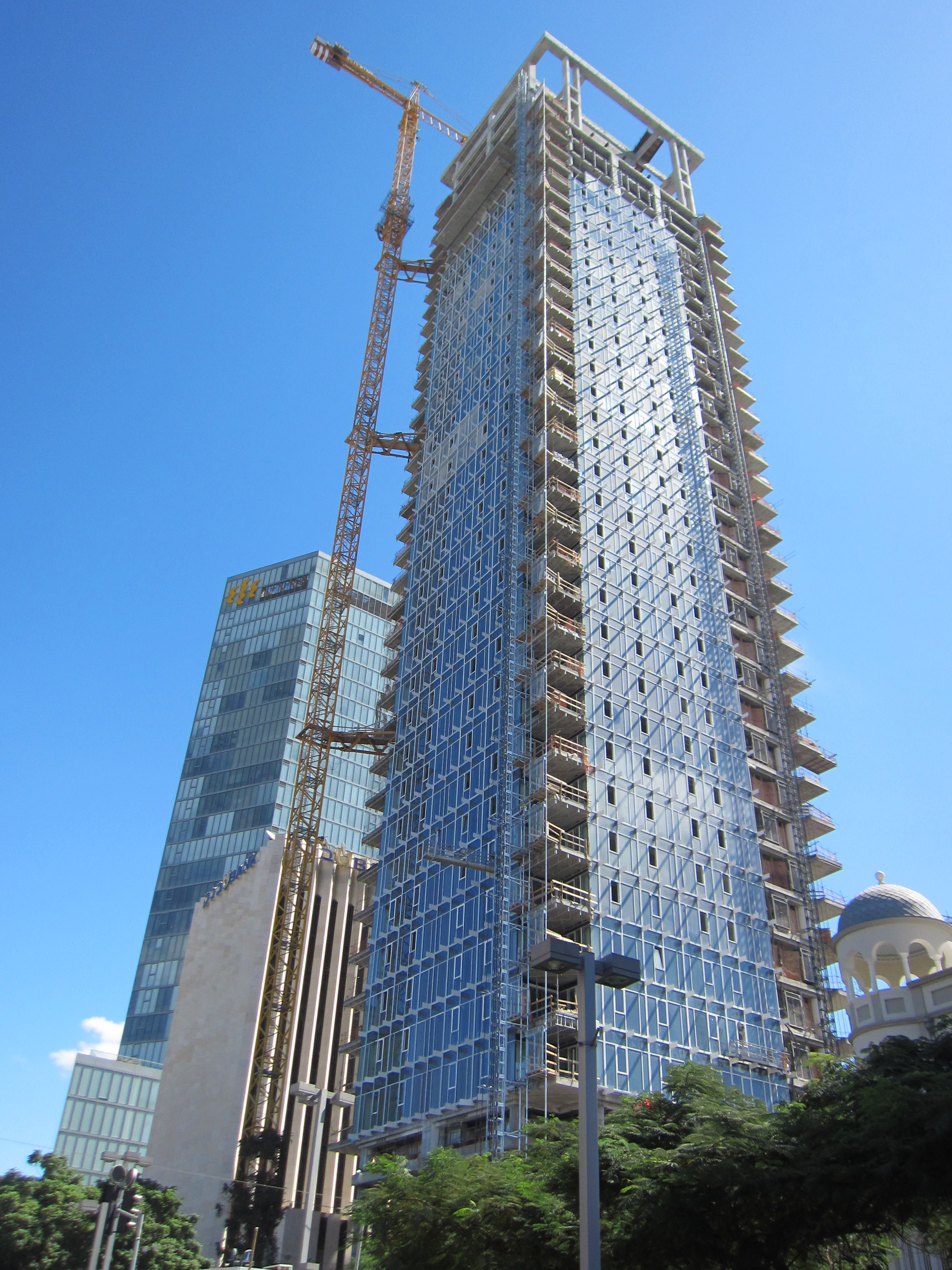
Meier on Rothschild tower, 2014
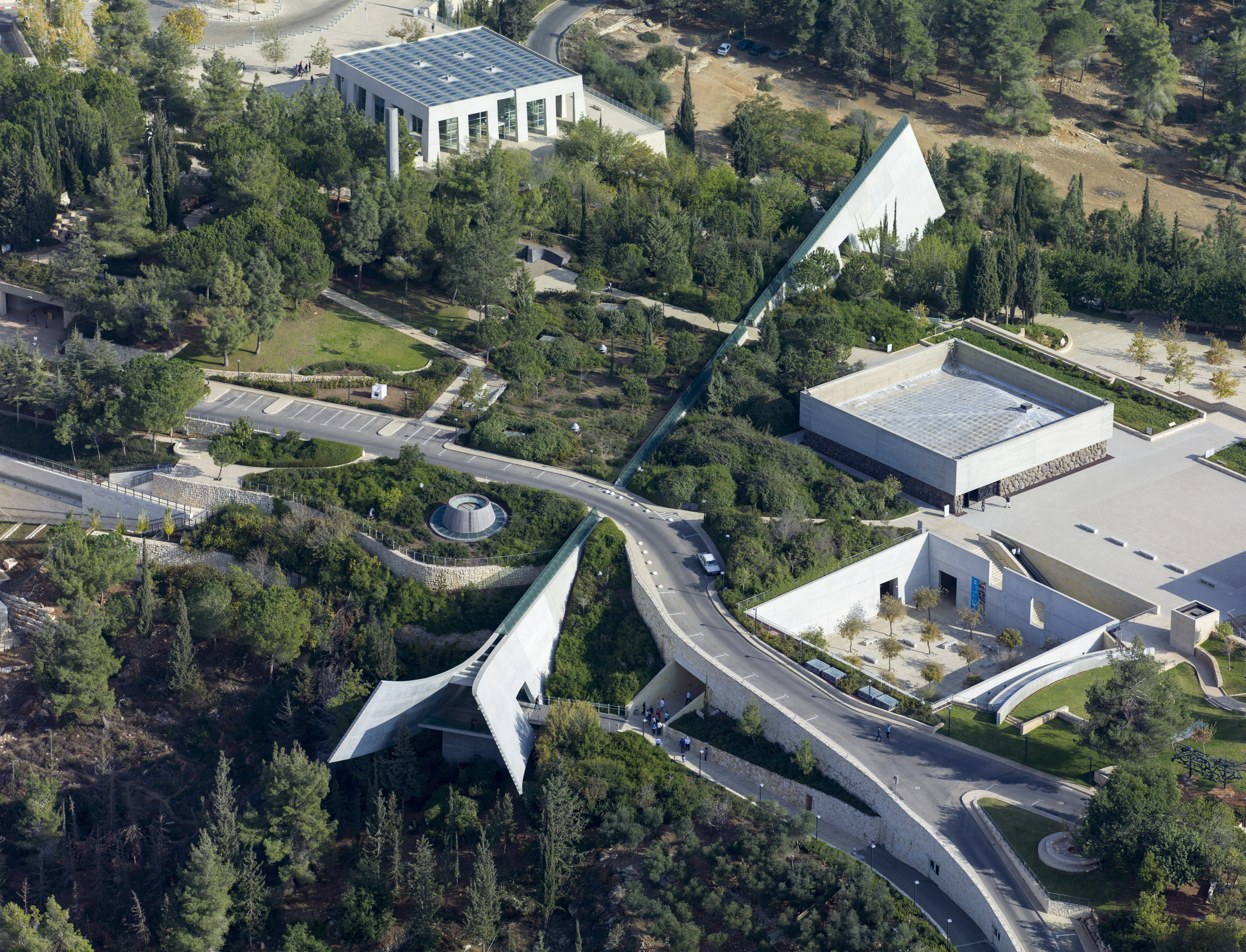
Yad Vashem Holocaust Museum, 2005, Architect Moshe Safdie

== See also ==
- Architecture of Palestine, which overlaps with the architecture of Israel
- Jewish architecture
- List of Jewish architects
