= Siksik Mosque =

Mosque in Jaffa, Tel Aviv, Israel

- مسجد السكسك מסגד סיכסיכ
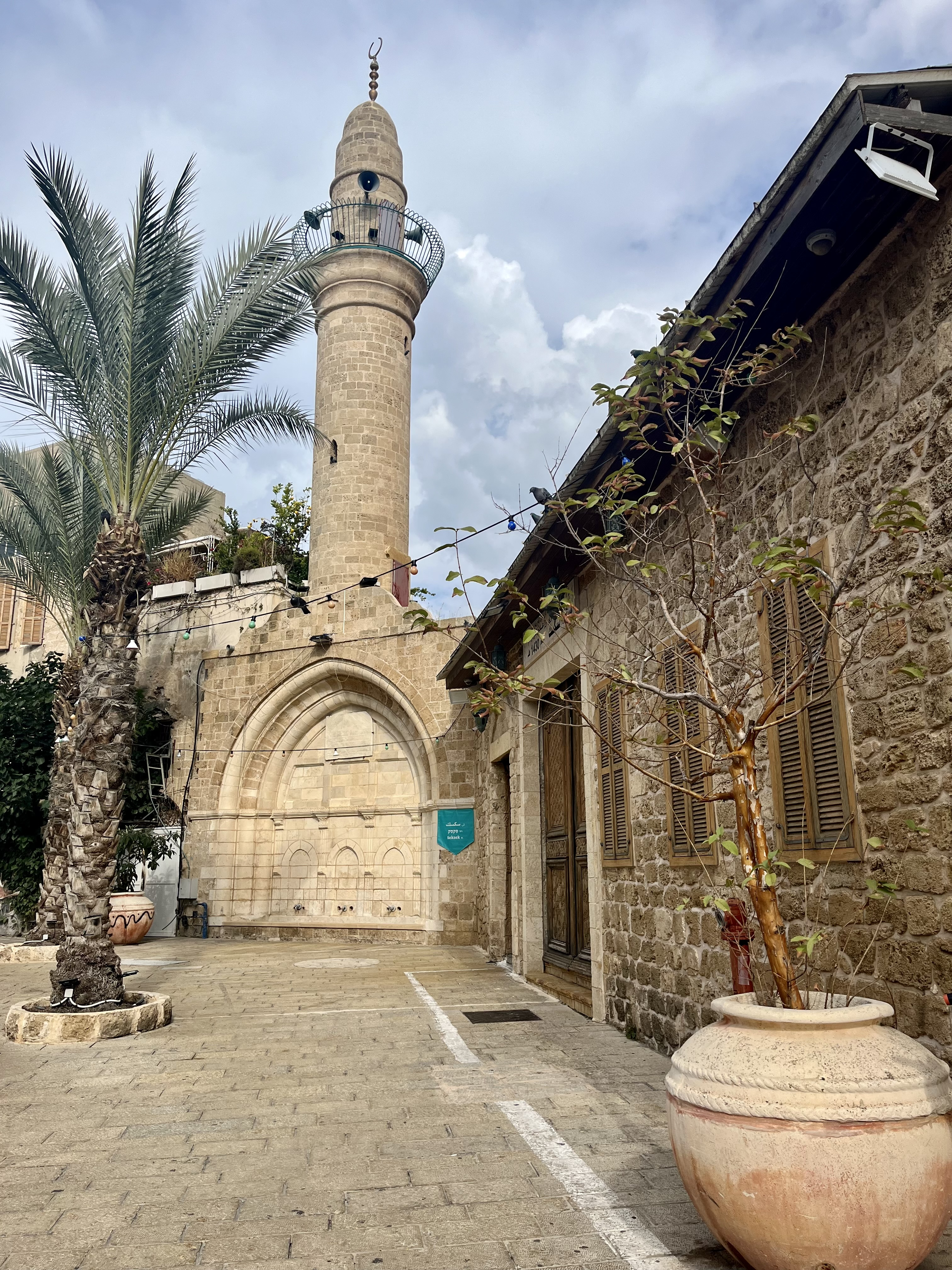
- The mosque in 2023

- Location of the mosque in central Israel

Religion
- Affiliation: Islam
- Branch/tradition: Sunni
- Ecclesiastical or organisational status: Mosque (1883–1919; since 2009); Profane use (1919–2009)
- Status: Active

Location
- Location: Jaffa, Tel Aviv, Central
- Country: Israel
- Interactive map of Siksik Mosque
- Coordinates: 32°03′09″N 34°45′28″E

Architecture
- Type: Mosque architecture
- Style: Ottoman
- Founder: Hajj Abd al-Qadir al-Siksik
- Completed: 1883

Specifications
- Dome: One
- Minaret: One

The Siksik Mosque or Al-Saksak Mosque (Arabic: مسجد السكسك; Hebrew: מסגד סיכסיכ) is a mosque in the Old City of Jaffa, in the Central district of Israel.

== History ==
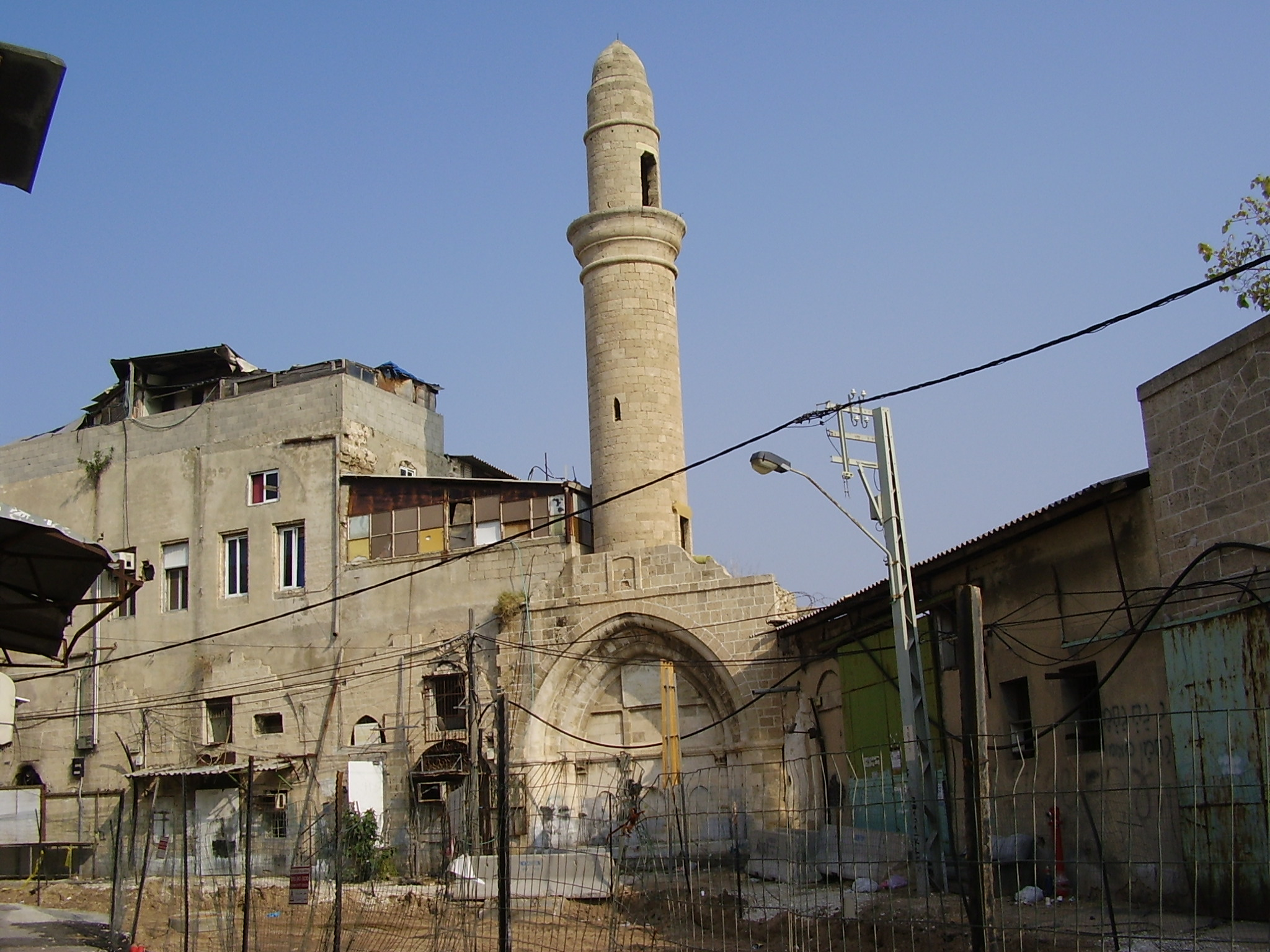
Siksik Mosque and Sabil Siksik in 2008 before renovation

The Siksik Mosque was constructed in the 1880s by the prominent Jaffa's Siksik family. Mahmoud Yazbak named Hajj Abd alQadir al-Siksik as the principal founder of the mosque. It was built on the land of Siksik family’s orchard on the Jaffa Jerusalem Road. It is the second mosque constructed outside the city walls.

The mosque stopped being used for worship in 1919. In 1948, the mosque's courtyard and part of the prayer hall were transformed into a café, and it was finally confiscated in 1965. The building also hosted a factory for the manufacture of plastic tools, while the second floor became a club for Bulgarian Jews.

In 2009, the mosque was renovated and recommenced functioning as an Islamic place of worship.

== Description ==
=== Siksik Mosque's Sebil ===
The mosque has a public fountain (sebil), which has the same name. It is built in the same style as Mahmudi fountain of nearby Mahmoudiya Mosque. The fountain building is decorated with a double-pointed arch. The upper part of the front wall is divided into six fields by bands. All those fields are empty. The slab with the inscription was attached by iron hooks to the middle top field. The lower part of the fountain wall has three decorative arches at the bottom of each tap, from which the water flows.

The slab with an inscription, sized 120 by 100 centimetres (47 by 39 in), is attached to the top middle front wall of the fountain. It has five lines, divided by bands. There is a tughra of the sultan Abdul Hamid II above the inscription.

== See also ==
- Islam in Israel
- List of mosques in Israel
