= Hassan Bek Mosque =

Mosque in Tel Aviv, Israel

- مسجد حسن بك מסגד חסן בק
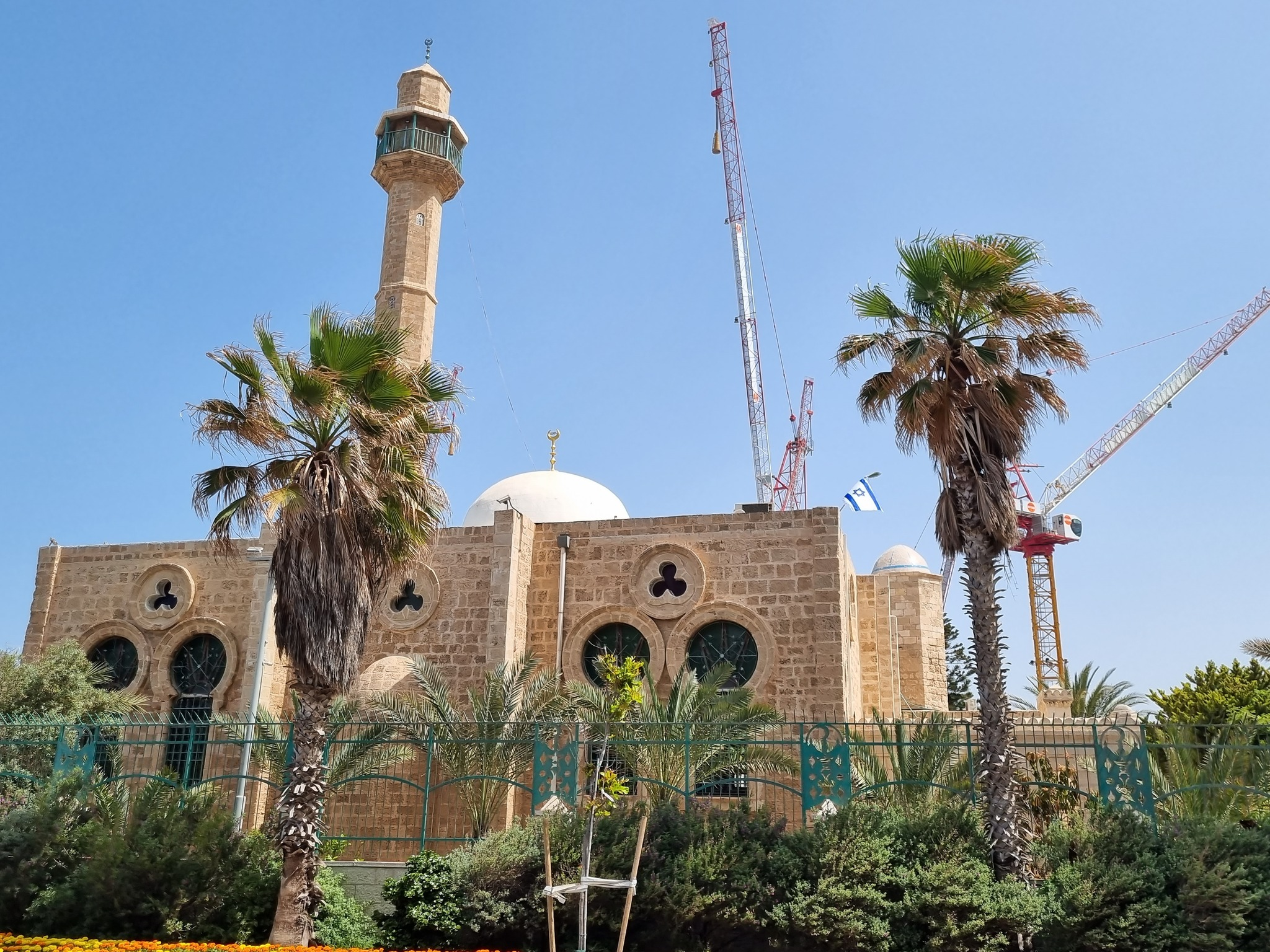
- The mosque, with Israeli flag, in 2022

- Location of the mosque in central Israel

Religion
- Affiliation: Islam
- Branch/tradition: Sunni
- Ecclesiastical or organisational status: Mosque
- Status: Active

Location
- Location: HaYarkon Street, Tel Aviv, Central
- Country: Israel
- Interactive map of Hassan Bek Mosque
- Coordinates: 32°03′59″N 34°45′49″E

Architecture
- Type: Mosque architecture
- Style: Ottoman
- Groundbreaking: 1916 CE
- Completed: 1923 CE

Specifications
- Dome: One
- Minaret: One
- Materials: White limestone; kurkar; concrete

The Hassan Bek Mosque (Arabic: مسجد حسن بك; Hebrew: מסגד חסן בק, romanized: Hasan Bek Camii; Turkish: Hasan Bek Camii), also known as the Hasan Bey Mosque, is a mosque in Tel Aviv, in the Central district of Israel. The mosque was built between 1916 and 1923 at the northern boundary of Arab Jaffa; its history is closely tied to the Arab–Jewish conflict. Completed in the Ottoman-style, the architecture of the mosque contrasts with the surrounding contemporary modern high-rises. It is located between the Neve Tzedek neighbourhood of Tel Aviv and the Mediterranean Sea, on the road to Jaffa.

== History ==
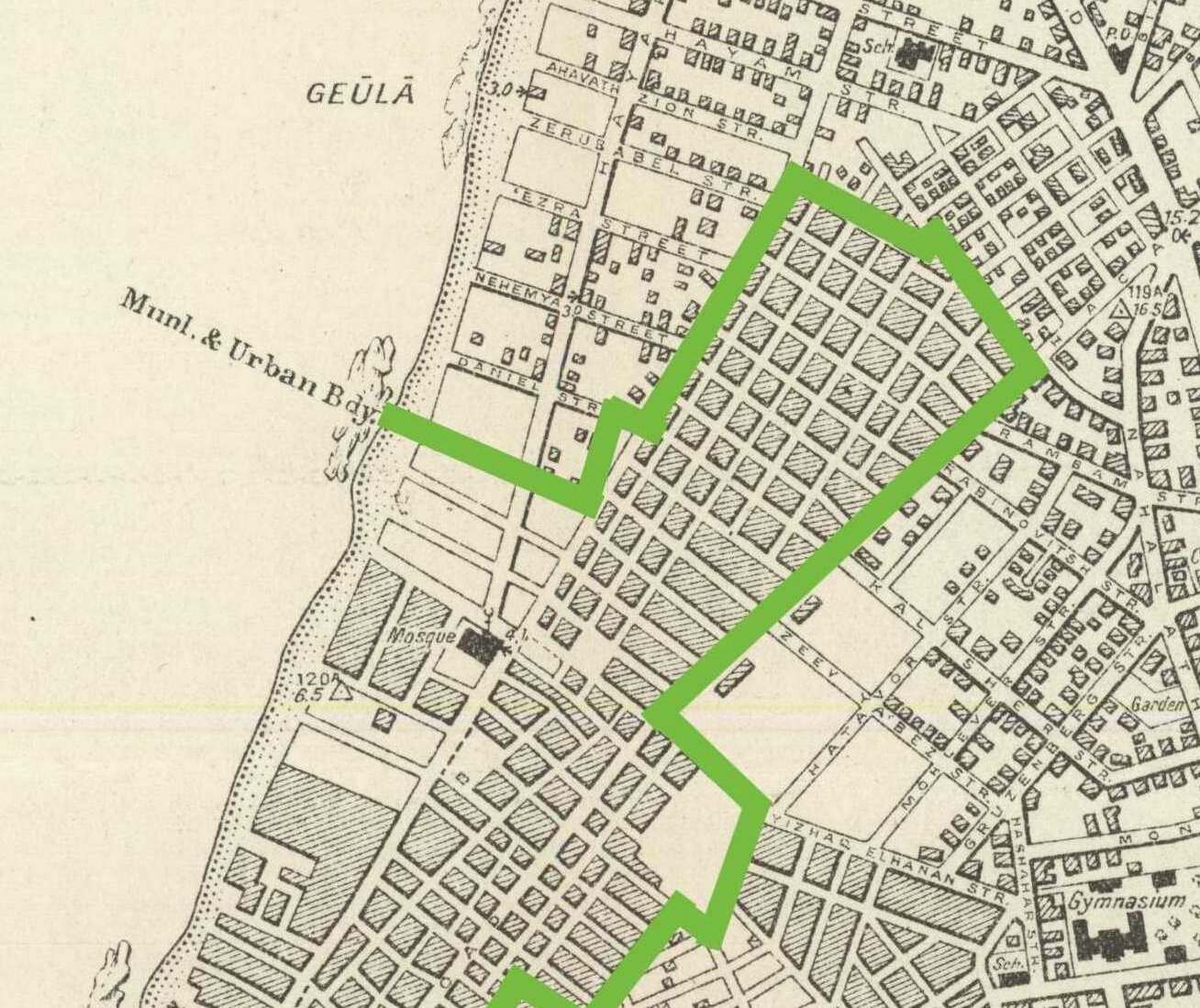
The Hassan Bek Mosque in a 1930 Survey of Palestine map, with green highlighting showing the boundary between Jaffa and Tel Aviv (both were then within the wider Jaffa Municipality)

The mosque was built on the orders of Jaffa's Ottoman governor of the same name, Hassan Bey or Bek, or Hassan Bey al-Basri Aljabi (حسن بيك الجابي). Hassan Bey headed Jaffa between August 1914 and May 1916. At the time, Jaffa, and the recently founded Tel Aviv, were both competitively expanding. The mosque was built on a plot of land selected and bought by Hassan Bey from its Arab owner. The location was selected in order to block the westward development of Tel Aviv. It was designed by Ben-Zion Gini, the Jewish city engineer of Jaffa. Construction began in 1916 but was interrupted by World War I, and thus took until 1923 to complete. The mosque was part of Jaffa's Manshiya neighborhood.

=== 20th century ===
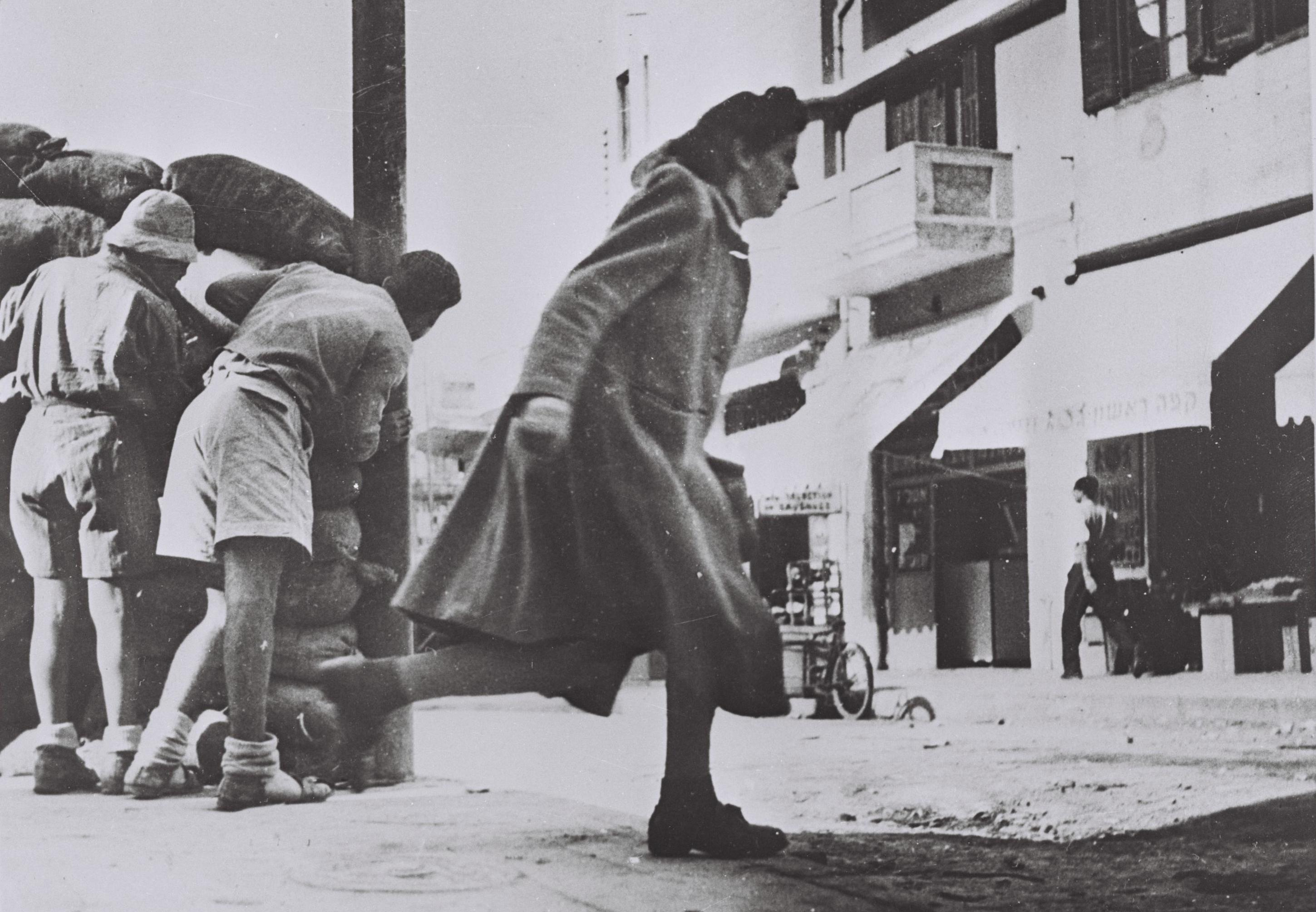
Tel Aviv residents taking cover from Arab snipers fire from Hassan Bek Mosque, 1948.

The mosque's minaret was often used by Arab snipers to shoot at Jewish forces in Tel Aviv and Manshiya, in the months preceding the British withdrawal in 1948.

The place of the razed Arab housing was taken by high-rise office buildings and a park. The Hassan Bek Mosque—spared due to the state and municipal authorities hesitating to be seen as desecrating a Muslim house of worship—remained, together with the building now housing the Irgun Museum of Tel Aviv, the last two remnants of the area's pre-1948 Manshiya neighbourhood.

The Hassan Bek Mosque lay derelict and neglected for many years, its empty shell used on some occasions by vagabonds and drug addicts.

In 1979, it was announced that the Jaffa Islamic Properties' Trustees had sold the mosque and its compound to Gershon Peres (brother of Shimon Peres, then Israeli Labor Party leader and former President of Israel), a property developer. It was planned to develop the site in into a shopping mall. The disclosure aroused a storm of protests by Israeli Arabs, supported by Israeli Jewish peace and human rights groups, who claimed that the Trustees had been appointed by the Government of Israel, that they did not represent the Muslim community of Jaffa, and that they had pilfered the money from the Peres deal into their own pockets. The outcome was that the real estate deal was cancelled and the mosque returned to the hands of the Jaffa Muslim Community.

=== 21st century ===
In October 2000, in the wake of riots by Israeli Arabs and Palestinians, the Hassan Bek Mosque in Jaffa was stoned by Israeli Jews, who tried to set it on fire.

The authorities gave permission for the Jaffa Arabs to restore the minaret, using volunteer work and funds provided by the governments of Jordan and Saudi Arabia. This is considered by Jaffa Arabs to be an important milestone in their recovered self-awareness and assertiveness in defence of their communal rights. The reconstructed minaret is twice as tall as the original one. Up to the present, Jaffa Arabs maintain an ongoing presence in the renovated mosque, and prayers are held in it regularly, though it is a considerable distance from the neighborhood where the Muslim community of Jaffa largely lives.

== Description ==
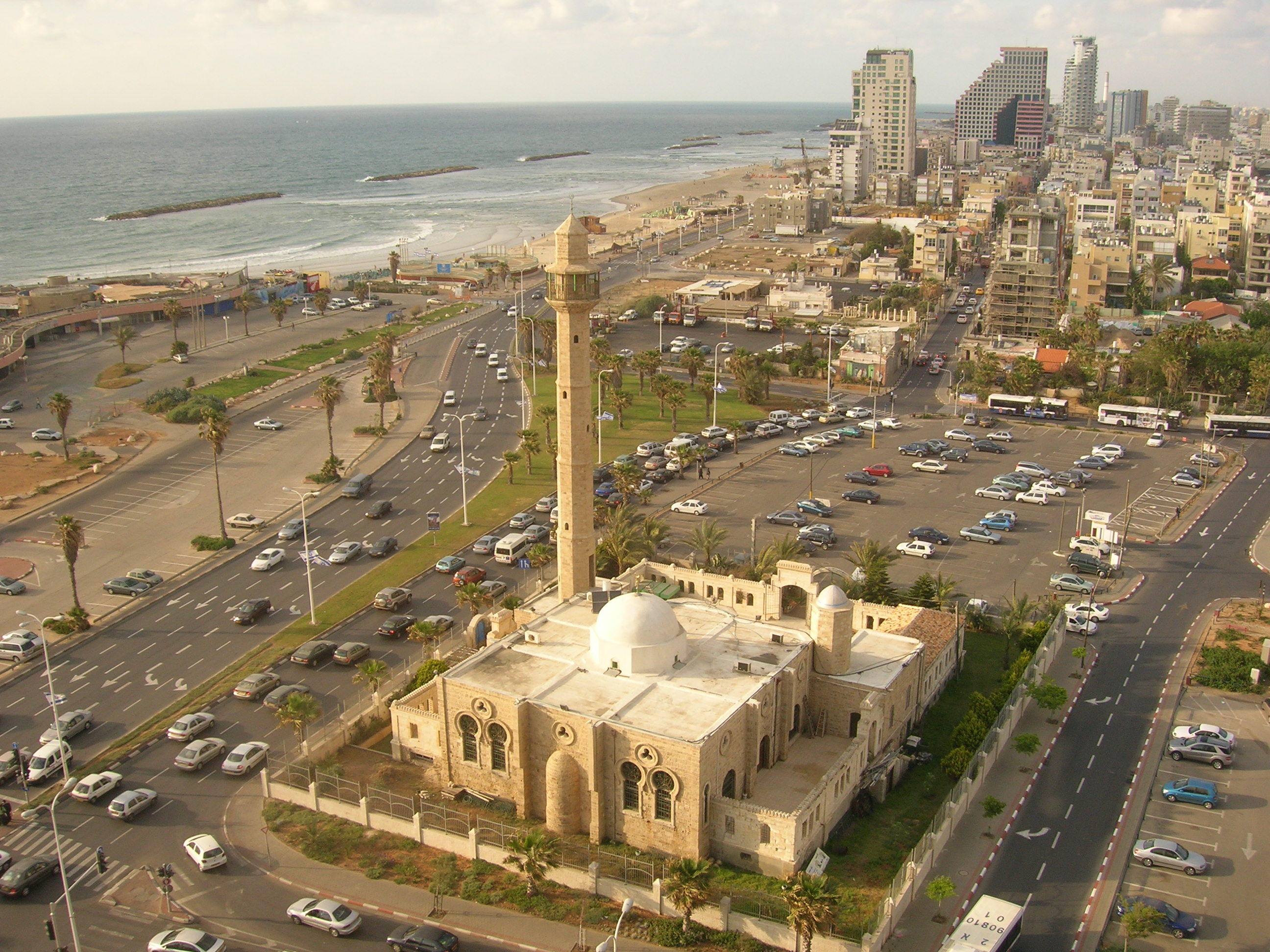
Bird's-eye view of the mosque from southeast

The Ottoman-style mosque initially measured 21 by 28 metres (69 by 92 ft), was well-proportioned and fit well into the Al-Manshiya neighbourhood. It had a courtyard partially paved and in part used as a garden; the prayer hall was entered by a staircase on its northern side. In 1923 the mosque was already the object of politically motivated renovations ordered by the Supreme Muslim Council, and its overall area was substantially expanded in the 1980s.

The mosque employs a white limestone instead of using the more common stone of the area, kurkar, a yellow-brown calcareous sandstone. The walls of the mosque are perforated with intricately decorated and colourfully glazed windows. The walls are also refined by narrow engaged piers that divide the wide façades into smaller sections. The current minaret was rebuilt at twice its original height as part of the renovation in the 1980s; extremely tall and slender, it contrasts with the square prayer hall. A very low tower rises on the opposite side of the mosque. The concrete roof is flat and proportionally low, with a shallow dome over the central bay.

== See also ==
- Islam in Israel
- List of mosques in Israel
