= Muhammad Abu Nabbut =

19th-century Ottoman Empire governor

Muhammad Abu-Nabbut Agha محمد أبو نبوت
- Monarchs: Sultan Mustafa IV (1807-1808); Sultan Mahmud II (1808-1839)

Governor of Gaza and Jaffa
- In office 1807–1818
- Preceded by: Muhammad Abu Marraq
- Succeeded by: Mustafa Bey

Governor of Thessaloniki
- In office 1819–1827

Muhammad (Mehmet) Abu Nabbut Agha (Arabic: محمد أبو نبوت) was the governor of Jaffa and Gaza in the early 19th century on behalf of the Ottoman Empire, from 1807 to 1818, as well as the governor of Thessaloniki from 1819 to 1827 during the Greek War of Independence.

== Biography ==
Born Christian in the Balkans, Abu Nabbut converted to Islam and started his military and political career as an officer in the janissary corps A few years after Jezzar's death in 1804, he was appointed by Jezzar's heir, Sulayman Pasha, as governor (Mütesellim) of the districts of Jaffa and Gaza.

Abu-Nabbut possessed a similar character to Jezzar, becoming known for his ambitious construction and refurbishment projects in Jaffa and for his boundless cruelty as a ruler. He was also known as a just ruler who strove to improve Jaffa and better its inhabitants. Under his rule, the population and economic conditions of Jaffa and Gaza improved substantially.

A number of legends surrounded Abu-Nabbut including one concerning his name. Abu-Nabbut, meaning "Father of the Club" in Arabic, supposedly was attributed to him from his habit of roaming the streets of Jaffa with a club, beating anyone who disobeyed his orders. The English traveller Charles Leonard Irby, who passed through Jaffa in 1817, observed that while his formal name was "Mohammed Aga", he was referred to as "Abou Nabout"; "the master of the mace or stick". Another local Palestinian legend tells of how Abu-Nabbut was locked out of Jaffa after leaving the city to walk through the nearby orchards. When he demanded the gate be opened for him, the guard refused because he did not believe it was Abu-Nabbut waiting outside. After repeated calls, Abu-Nabbut was allowed entry. The next morning he summoned all of Jaffa's inhabitants and proclaimed "Cursed be the man, and cursed his father, who joins himself to a man of Jaffa." He ordered that this to be engraved on his well along the Jaffa Road.

When Sulayman Pasha of Acre fell ill in 1818, Abu Nabbut apparently made moves to become his successor as governor of Acre. However, this did not suit Sulayman Pasha's influential financial advisor, Haim Farhi, who favoured his young protégé Abdullah Pasha, believing that Abdullah would be more easy to control. Farhi therefore convinced Sulayman Pasha in the summer of 1818 to move against Abu Nabbut. Abu Nabbut was hence removed from Jaffa through an internal coup. This earned Farhi the eternal enmity of Abu Nabbut, who after his removal from Jaffa went to Istanbul, "where he could intrigue" against Farhi.

Between 1819 and 1827 Abu-Nabbut again served as a governor, first at Selanik, then at Diyarbakir.

After inquiries in Jaffa in the 1870s, Clermont-Ganneau found that the tomb of "the legendary Abu Nabbut" was located near the Sebil Abu Nabbut in Jaffa. This tomb survived at least until 1950, but it has now disappeared.

== Buildings ==
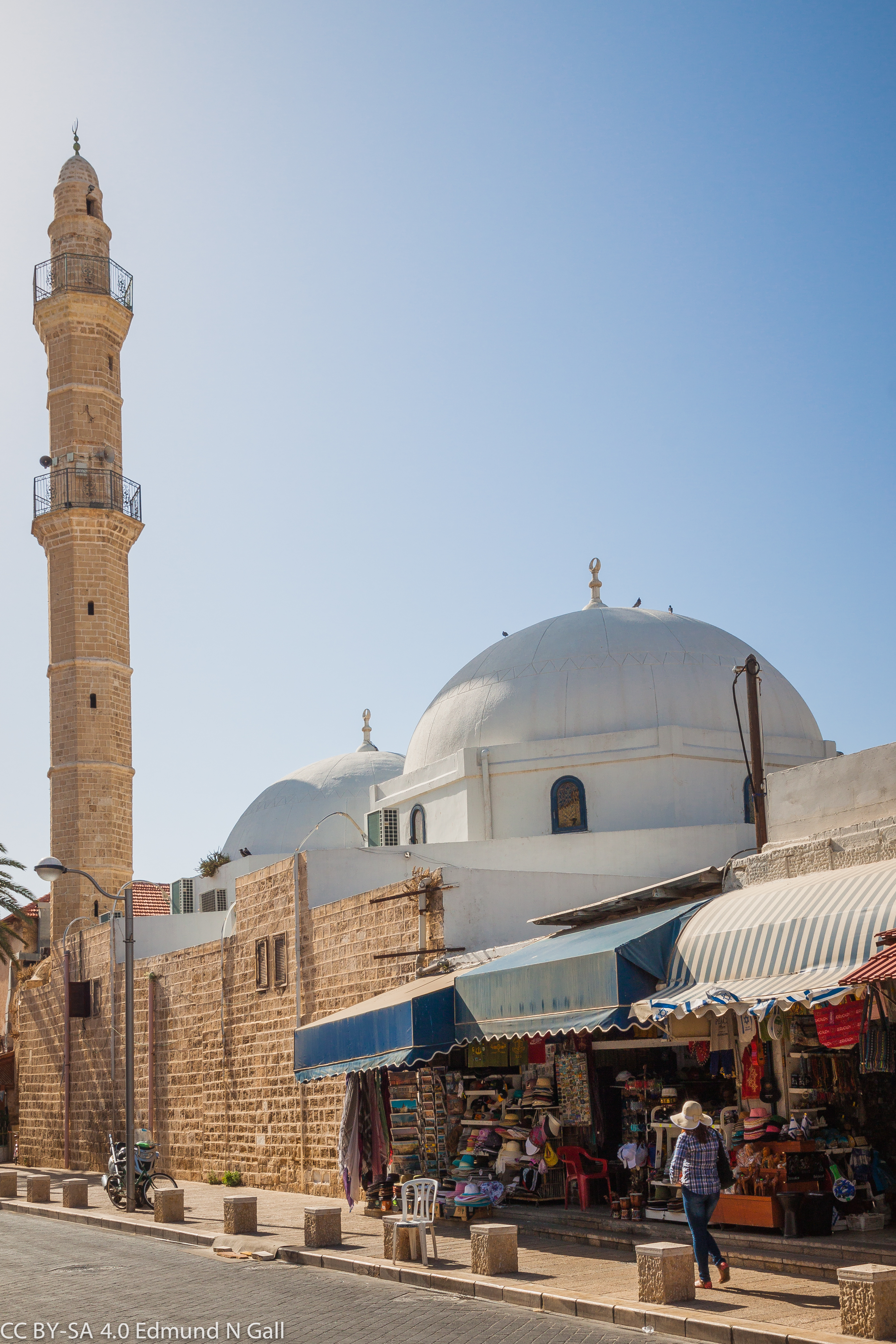
Mahmoudiya Mosque, built by Abu Nabbut in 1812

During his tenure as governor Abu-Nabbut was responsible for a large number of building projects in Jaffa, including the completion of the fortifications of the city, the renovation of the Great Mosque, the erection of two sabils (public fountains), and the construction of cotton and wool markets.

=== Fortifications ===
The French sacking of the city after the Siege of Jaffa in 1799 proved the inadequacy of the city walls, and when the city was returned to Ottoman control in 1800, Turkish and British engineers began to rebuild the fortifications. This task was completed under Abu-Nabbut from 1810 and onwards. Abu Nabbut added a monumental eastern gate crowned with three cupolas. The fortifications were specially designed to cope with European artillery and possessed thick walls, with substantial corner bastions, capable of supporting large cannons. Similar fortifications have survived at Acre. However, later in the nineteenth century the political situation had changed, and Abu-Nabbut's fortifications were no longer needed. By 1888 the dismantling process was complete and the moat was entirely filled in. Today, only two gateways and a short section of Abu-Nabbut's wall remains.

=== Mahmoudiya Mosque ===
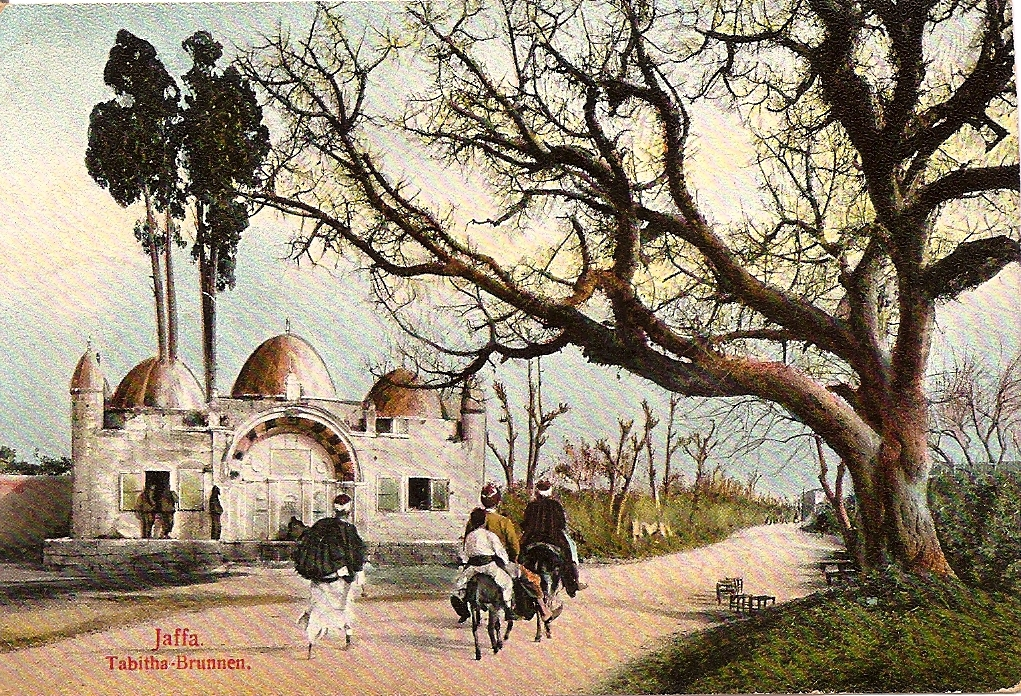
Sabil, or public fountain, in Jaffa, built by Abu Nabbut. Here the west face on old postcard from the British Mandate of Palestine-period.

During his tenure as governor, in 1812, Abu-Nabbut ordered the construction of the Mahmoudiya Mosque which today is the largest mosque in Jaffa.

=== Sabil Abu Nabbut ===
Above the columns on the west side of the building is a plaque commemorating the construction of the sabil in 1236 H.

=== Palestinian villages ===
The inhabitants of al-Jiyya reported that their village had been ruined at one point and then rebuilt by Abu Nabbut.

== See also ==
- Lady Hester Stanhope

== Bibliography ==
- Clermont-Ganneau, C.S. (1896). [ARP] Archaeological Researches in Palestine 1873-1874, translated from the French by J. McFarlane. Vol. 2. London: Palestine Exploration Fund. Cited in Petersen, (2001).
- Irby, C.L; Mangles, J. (1823). Travels in Egypt and Nubia, Syria, and Asia Minor; during the years 1817 & 1818. London: Printed for Private Distribution by T. White & Co.( p.382)
- Irby, Charles Leonard, James Mangles, Henrich Steffens (1852),Travels in Egypt and Nubia, Syria, and the Holy Land: including a journey round the Dead Sea, and through the country east of the Jordan Published by J. Murray, 150 pages p.116
- Kana`an, Ruba (1998), Jaffa and the Waqf of Muhammad Aga Abu Nabbut (1799-1831): A Study in Urban History of an East Mediterranean City, D.Phil. Thesis. Oxford: Oxford University. Cited in Petersen (2001).
- Kana`an, Ruba (2001), Waqf, Architecture, and Political Self-Fashioning: The Construction of the Great Mosque of Jaffa by Muhammad Aga Abu Nabbut. In Muqarnas XVIII: An Annual on Islamic Art and Architecture. Gülru Necipoglu (ed.). Leiden: E.J. Brill. (.htlm link)
- Khalidi, W. (1992). All That Remains: The Palestinian Villages Occupied and Depopulated by Israel in 1948. Washington D.C.: Institute for Palestine Studies. ISBN 0-88728-224-5.
- Mayer, L. A.; Pinkerfeld, J.; Yadin, Y. (1950). Some Principal Muslim Religious Buildings in Israel. Jerusalem: Ministry of religious affairs. Cited in Petersen (2001)
- Petersen, Andrew (2001). A Gazetteer of Buildings in Muslim Palestine (British Academy Monographs in Archaeology). Vol. 1. Oxford University Press. ISBN 978-0-19-727011-0.
- Philipp, Thomas (2001), Acre, The rise and fall of a Palestinian city. 1730-1830 Columbia University press
- Tolkowsky, S. (1924), The Gateway of Palestine: A History of Jaffa, Routledge, London. Cited in Petersen, (2002).
- Vilnay, Z. (2003). Legends of Palestine. Kessinger Publishing. ISBN 9780766141285.
