= Al-Muallaq Mosque =

Mosque in Acre, Northern, Israel

- المسجد المعلق מסגד אל-מועלק
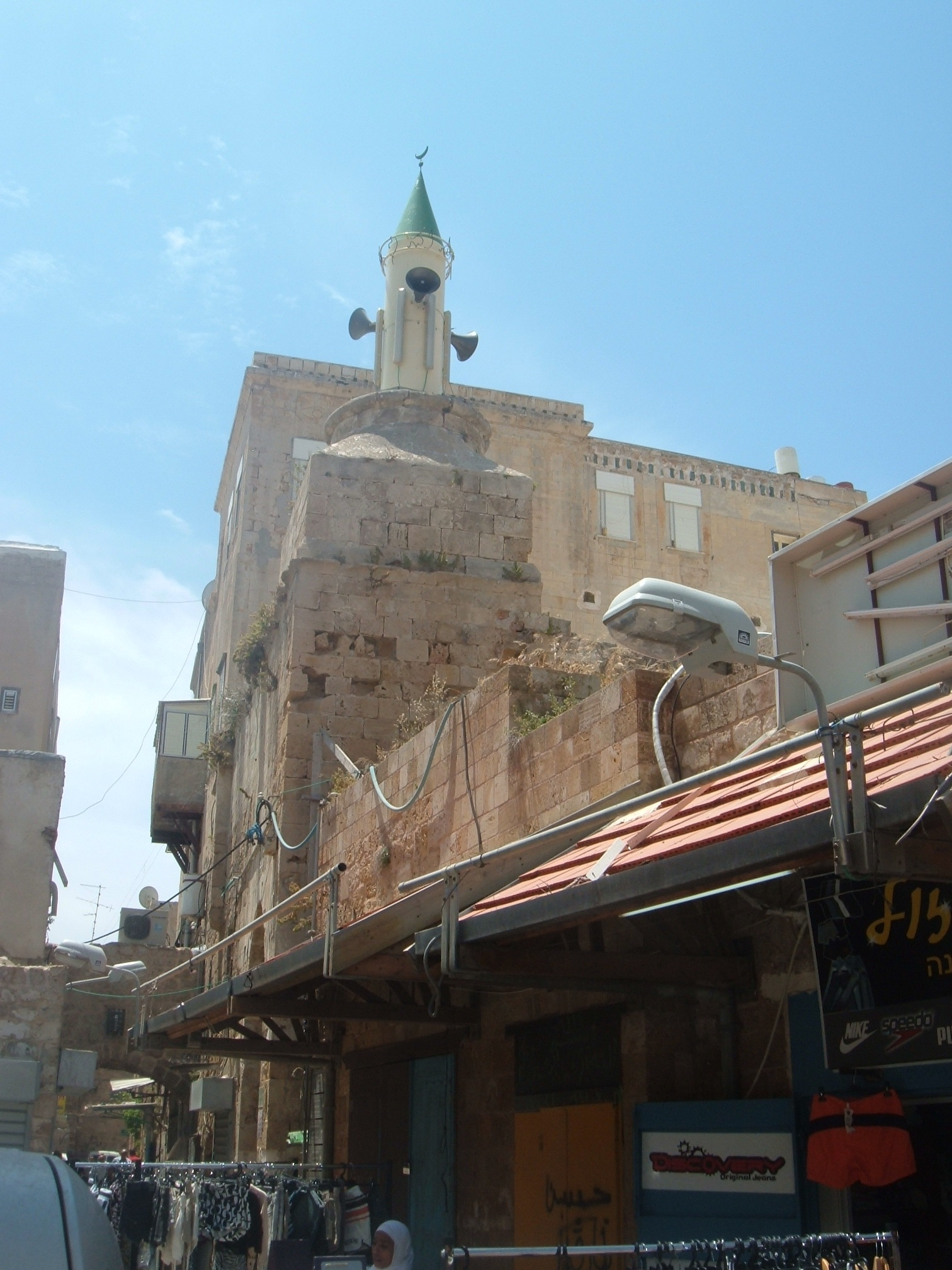
- The mosque in 2009

- Location of the mosque in northern Israel

Religion
- Affiliation: Islam
- Branch/tradition: Sunni
- Ecclesiastical or organisational status: Mosque (since 1758); Synagogue (prior to 1746)
- Status: Active

Location
- Location: Acre, Northern
- Country: Israel
- Interactive map of Al-Muallaq Mosque
- Coordinates: 32°55′15″N 35°04′08″E

Architecture
- Type: Islamic architecture
- Style: Ottoman
- Founder: Daher al-Umar
- Completed: 1758 CE (as a mosque)
- Minaret: One: (partially demolished in 1950)

The al-Muallak Mosque (Arabic: المسجد المعلق, romanized: Masjid Al-Muallaq; Hebrew: מסגד אל-מועלק, romanized: Misgad Al-Muallak) also known as the Mosque of Daher al-Umar (Arabic: مسجد ظاهر العمر) is a mosque, located in Acre, in the northern district of Israel.

== History ==
Up until 1746, the structure was used as a synagogue, called the Ramchal Synagogue, by Acre's Jewish residents.

Daher al-Umar, an Arab ruler of Acre, rebuilt the former synagogue as a mosque in 1758. It was built in a courtyard on the site of a structure commissioned by the Crusaders and which later became the gate to the Genoaese quarter of the city. The Jews owned the building when Daher chose to transform it into a mosque, but he compensated them by building a synagogue, located in Acre's Jewish quarter. Leftover features of the former synagogue include the niche for the Holy Ark and inscriptions in Hebrew.

== Architecture ==
The mosque is positioned along the edge of Acre's Old City market, situated between Khan al-Umdan and Khan al-Ifranj, and is risen over the street. From the outside, the main indicators of the mosque are its low-lying dome and the round base of its former minaret. The mosque's entrance is located beneath the base of the original minaret. The minaret was demolished by the municipality of Acre in 1950, citing a public safety risk. The body of the mosque is mainly constituted by a large, square-shaped prayer hall, A triple-domed portico precedes the prayer hall's entrance. Beside the prayer hall is a smaller room that was used as a library. A stairway beneath a covered entryway leads into the courtyard.

== See also ==
- Islam in Israel
- List of mosques in Israel
