= White Mosque, Nazareth =

Ottoman-era mosque in Israel

White Mosque
- المسجد الأبيض המסגד הלבן
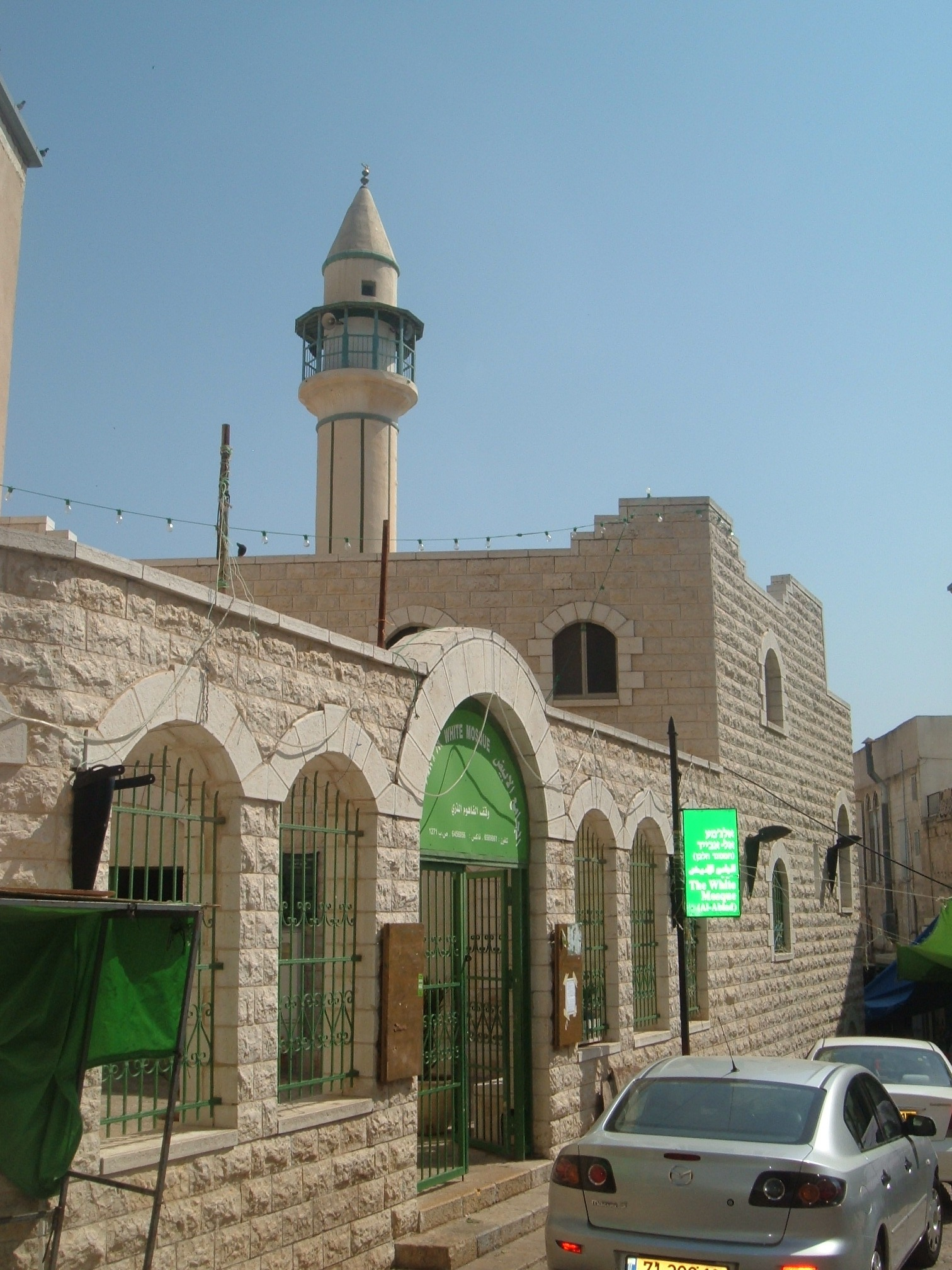
- The mosque entrance in 2009

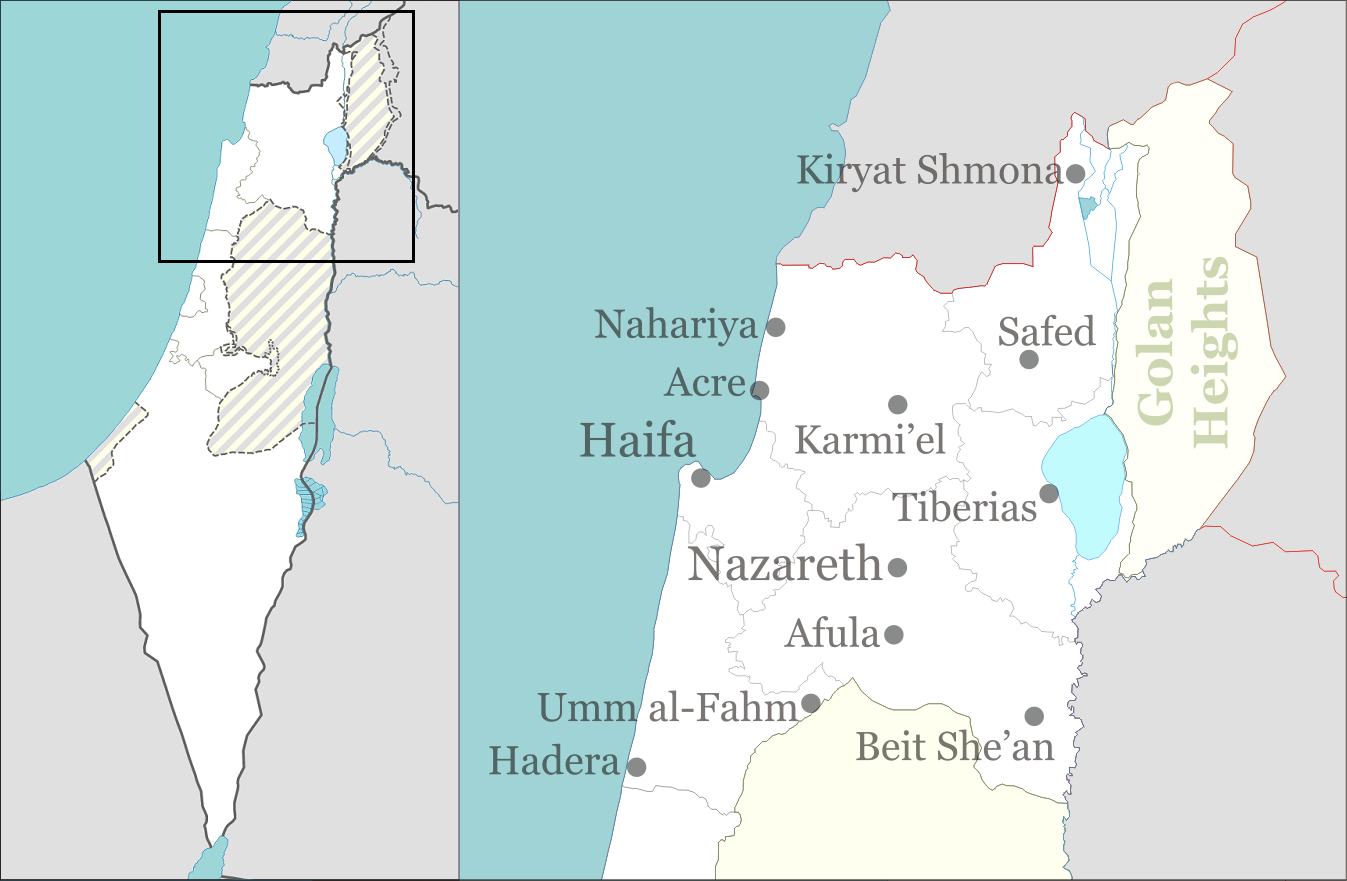
- Location of the mosque in northern Israel

Religion
- Affiliation: Islam
- Branch/tradition: Sunni
- Ecclesiastical or organizational status: Mosque
- Status: Active

Location
- Location: Nazareth, Northern District
- Country: Israel
- Interactive map of White Mosque
- Coordinates: 32°42′12″N 35°17′54″E

Architecture
- Type: Islamic architecture
- Style: Ottoman
- Founder: Sulayman Pasha al-Adil
- Completed: 1808 CE
- Minaret: One

The White Mosque (Arabic: المسجد الأبيض, romanized: al-Masjid al-Abyad; Hebrew: המסגד הלבן, romanized: HaMisgad HaLavan), is a mosque, located in Nazareth, in the northern district of Israel. The mosque is situated in Harat Alghama, or the Mosque Quarter, in the centre of Nazareth's Old Market area. The mosque's pencil-shaped minaret, cream-coloured walls, and green-coloured trim and dome are an example of the Ottoman architecture that is commonly found throughout the city.

== History and ownership ==
The construction of the mosque was funded by the Egyptian Ottoman ruler Sulayman Pasha al-Adil in the latter half of the eighteenth century and overseen by the high commissioner of Nazareth, Sheikh Abdullah al-Fahoum. It was constructed between 1804 and 1808. Sheikh Abdullah was granted its trusteeship in the form of a waqf; he administered the mosque until his death in 1815. His tomb is located in the mosque's courtyard.

After Sheikh Abdullah's death, the managing of the mosque's affairs were transferred to Sheikh Amin al-Fahoum. The mosque continues to form part of the al-Fahoum family waqf, which also includes the khan of the pasha on Casa Nova Street. It is administered by one of Sheikh Abdullah's descendants, ʾAtif al-Fahoum.

The White Mosque of Nazareth was erected by Sheikh Abdullah to mark the end of the reign of the former Ottoman governor, Jazzar Pasha, the predecessor to Suleiman Pasha. Sheikh Abdullah chose "white" to symbolize a new era of purity, light, and peace to be enjoyed between the faiths in Nazareth.

== Community use ==
On a regular day, between 100 and 200 people attend noon and afternoon prayer services, while the Friday sermon is attended by 2,000 to 3,000 people.

The mosque serves the Muslim community of Nazareth by offering religious classes for young men and sponsoring the Muslim "scout troop", in which 400 boys and girls aged nine and older participate. It also houses a museum with exhibits that document Nazareth's recent history.

== Gallery ==
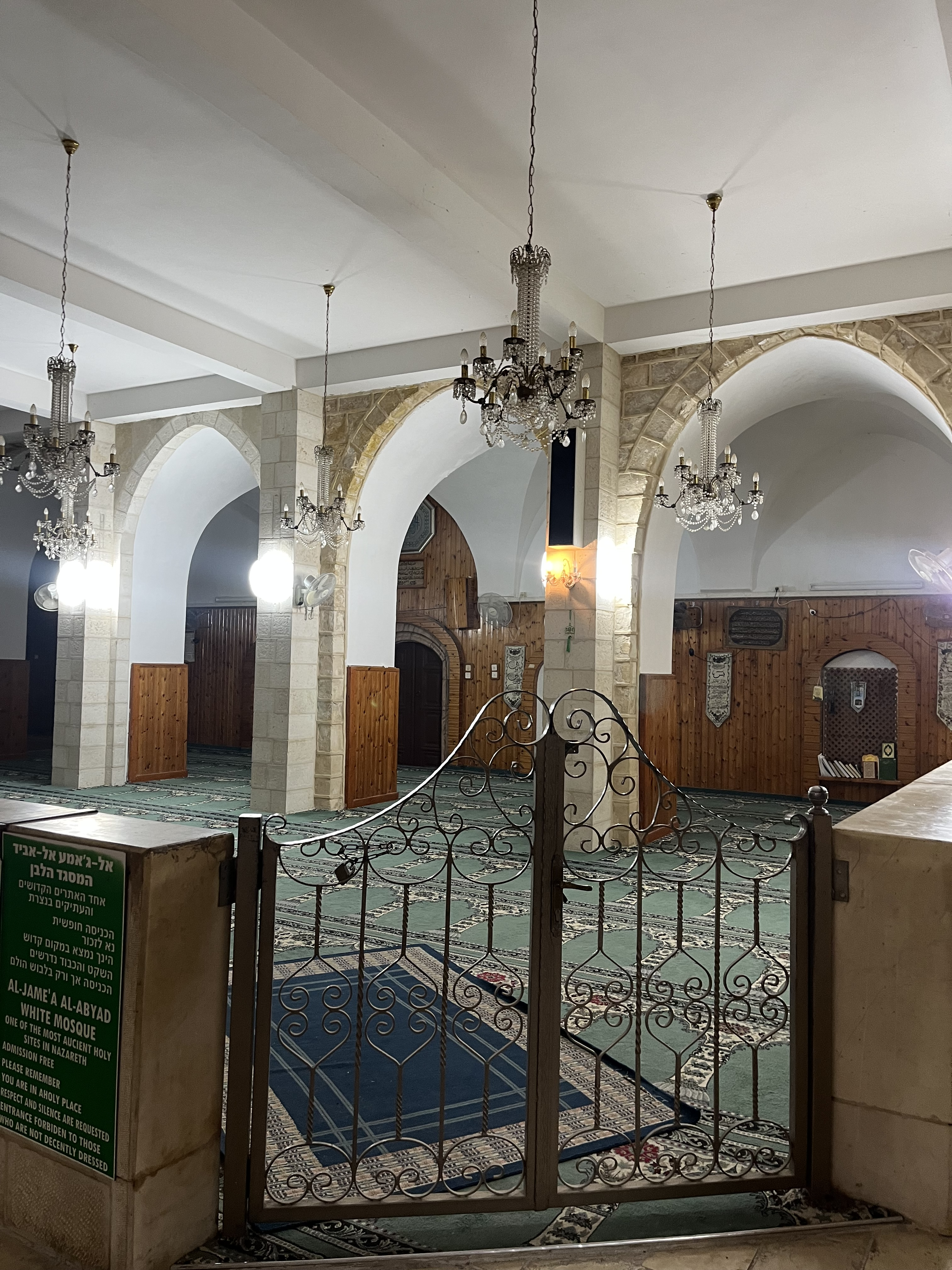
Interior of the mosque

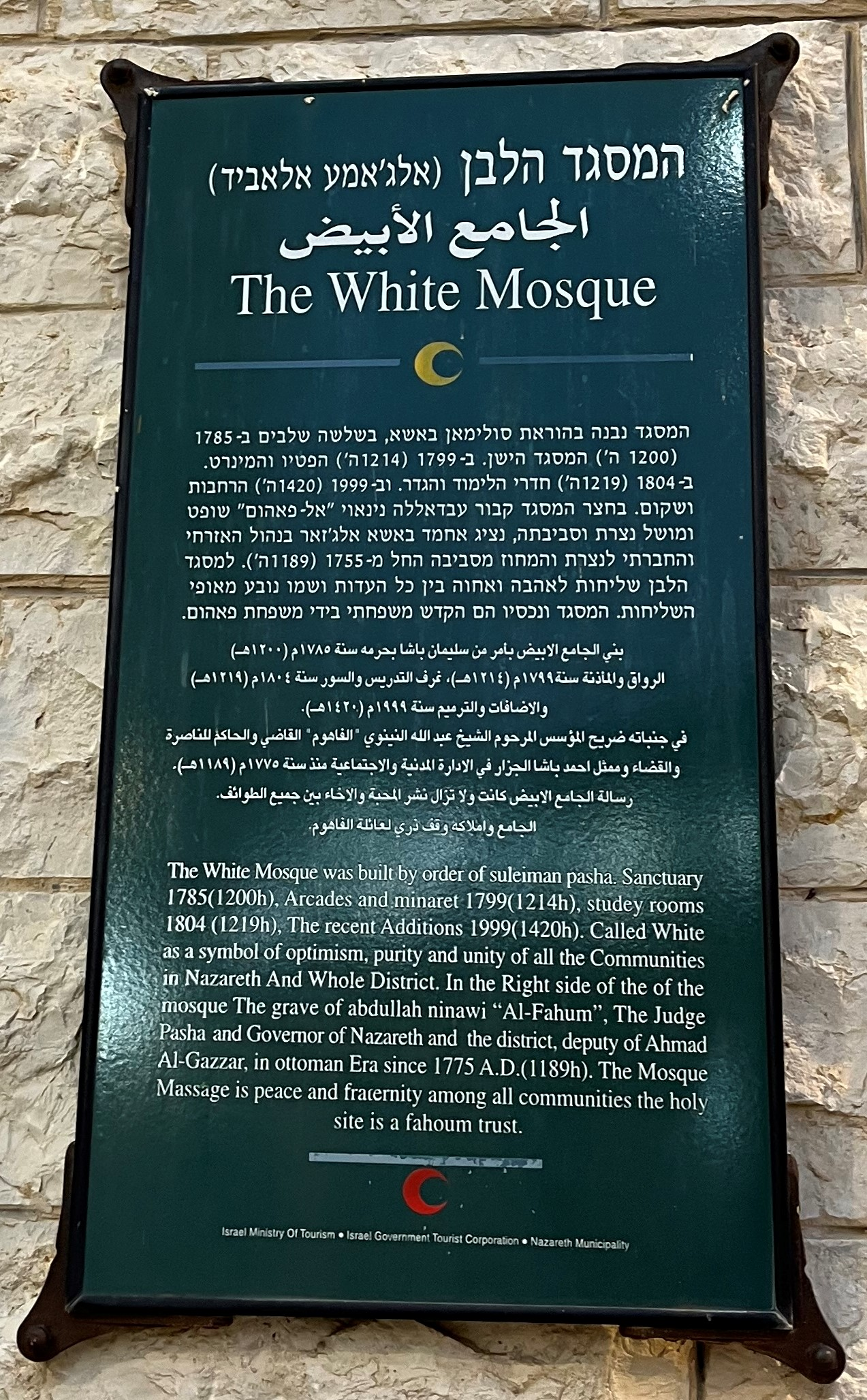
Sign in front of the mosque

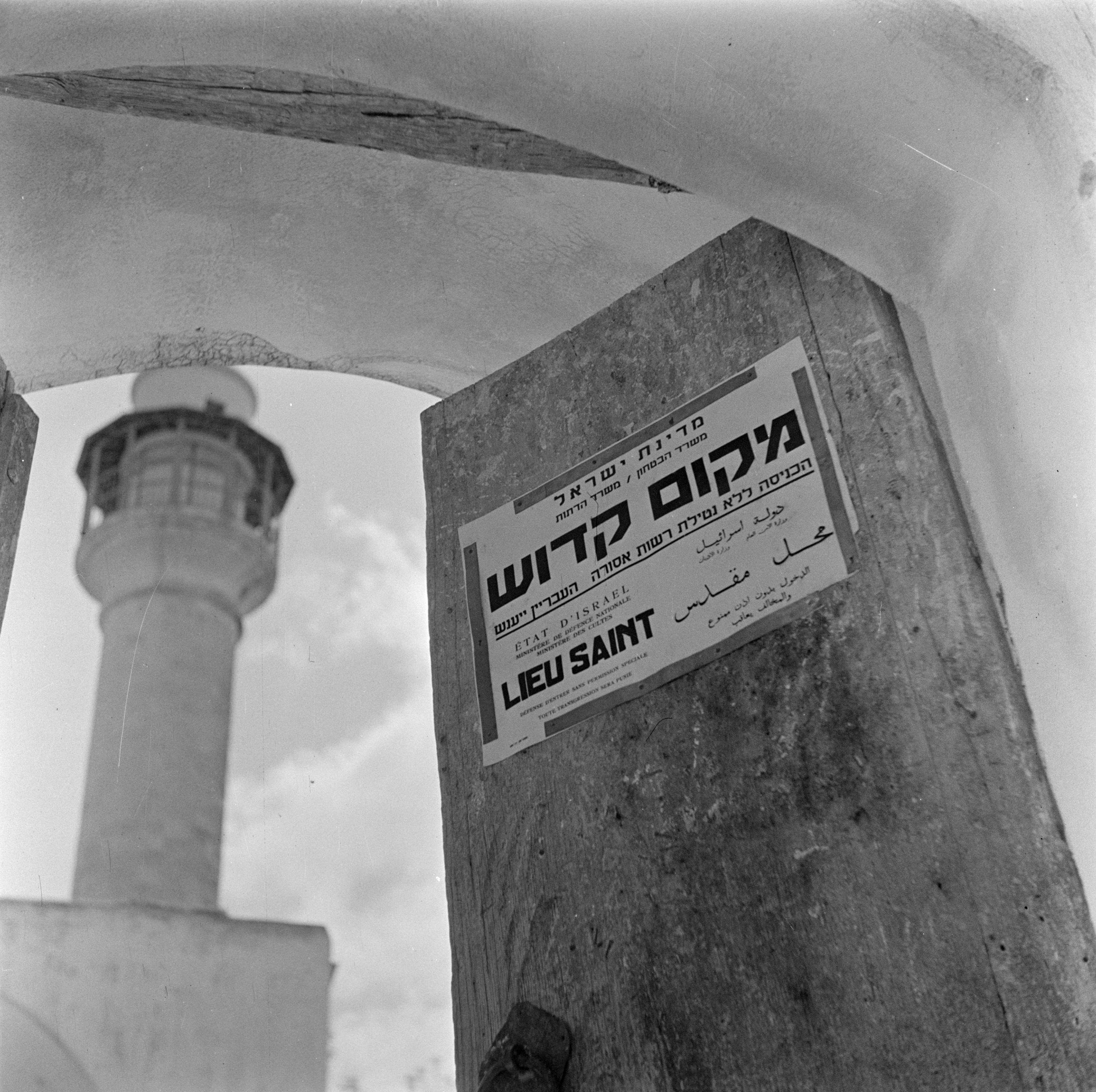
The minaret, in 1948

The mosque in 1840

== See also ==
- Islam in Israel
- List of mosques in Israel
