= Al-Bahr Mosque =

Mosque in Jaffa, Tel Aviv, Israel

- مسجد البحر; מסגד הים
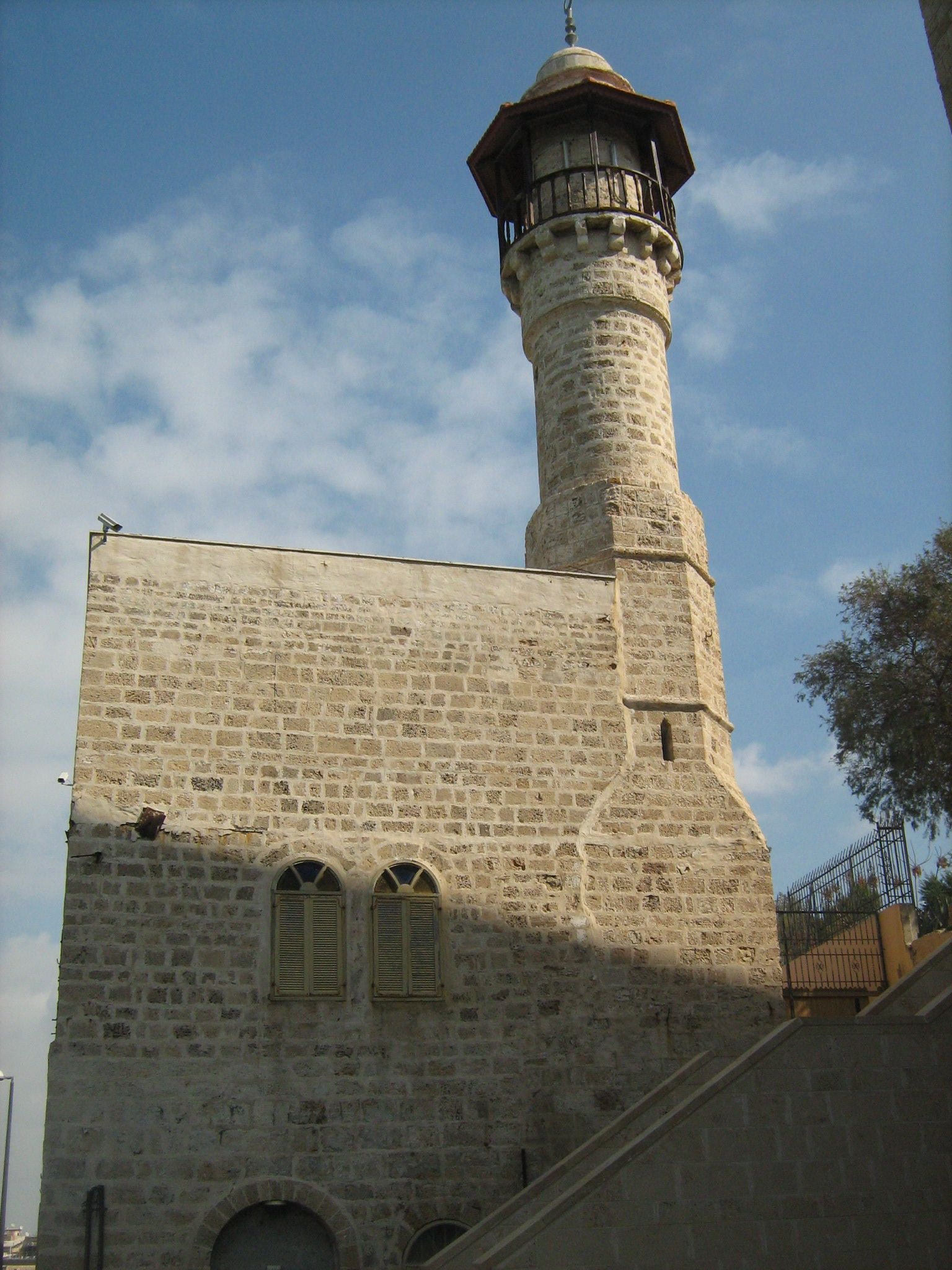
- View of the minaret

- Location of the mosque in Tel Aviv District, Israel

Religion
- Affiliation: Islam
- Branch/tradition: Sunni
- Ecclesiastical or organizational status: Mosque
- Status: Active

Location
- Location: HaAliya HaShniya Street, Jaffa, Tel Aviv, Tel Aviv District
- Country: Israel
- Interactive map of Al-Bahr Mosque
- Coordinates: 32°03′20″N 34°45′10″E

Architecture
- Type: Mosque architecture
- Style: Ottoman
- Completed: 1675 CE
- Minaret: One

The al-Bahr Mosque (Arabic: مسجد البحر, romanized: Masjid al-Bahr, lit. 'The Sea Mosque'; Hebrew: מסגד הים, romanized: Misgad HaYam), is the oldest extant mosque in the historical part of Jaffa, in greater Tel Aviv, in the Tel Aviv District of Israel.

== Overview ==
Built in 1675 CE, the mosque is situated on the HaAliya HaShniya Street near the harbour. Due to its proximity to the Mediterranean Sea, fishermen and sailors used the mosque, as well as nearby inhabitants of the surrounding area. Built by the 'Azza /Alazzeh family as inscribed in stone above the entrance next to the Basmala.

== See also ==
- Islam in Israel
- List of mosques in Israel
