= Al-Jiyya =

al-Jiyya الجية al-Jeya, al-Jiya, Ed-Deir, Ejjeh
- Village
- Etymology: "water collector"
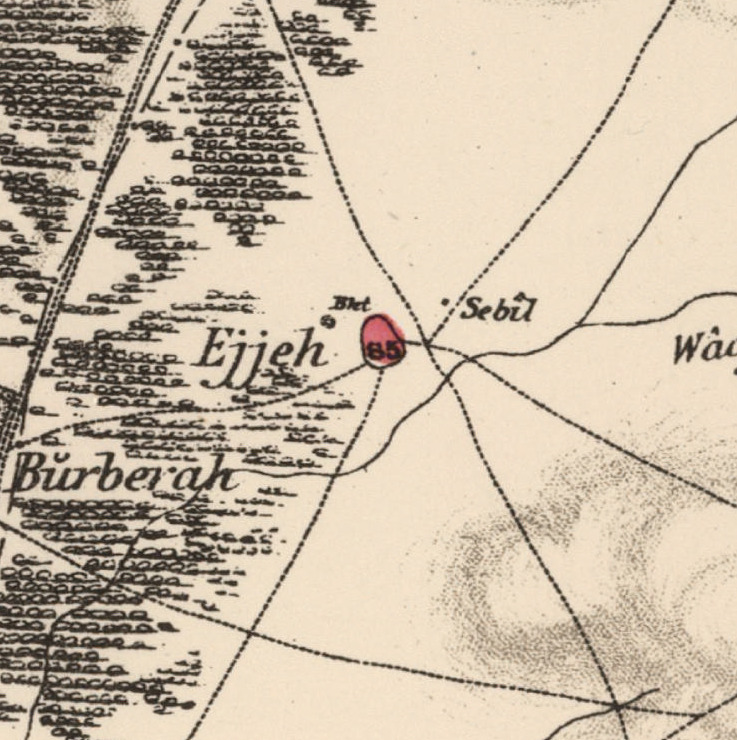
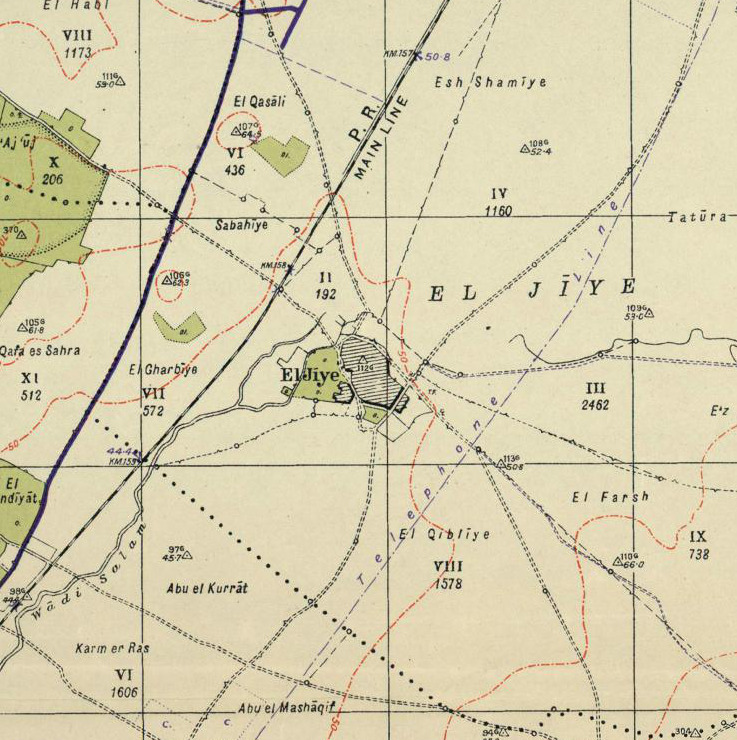
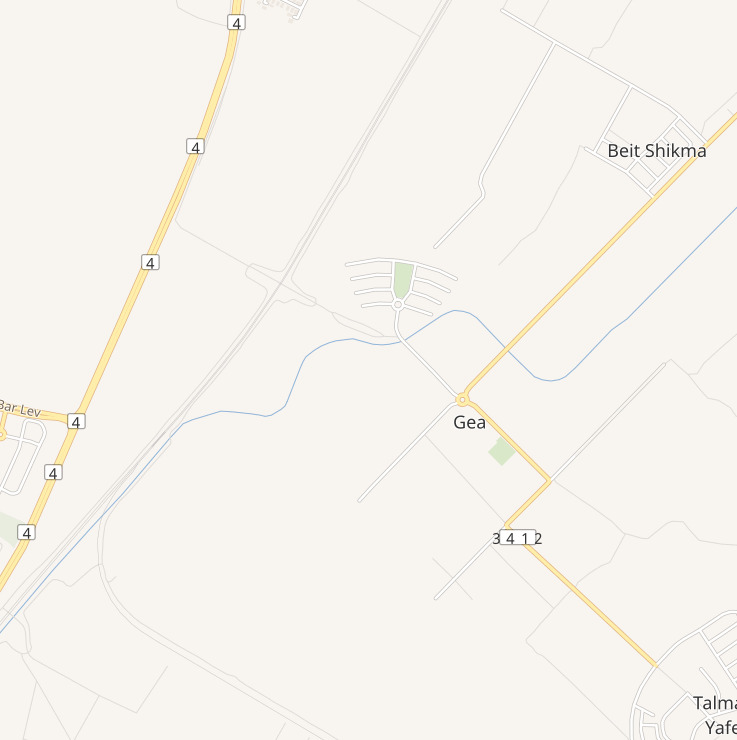
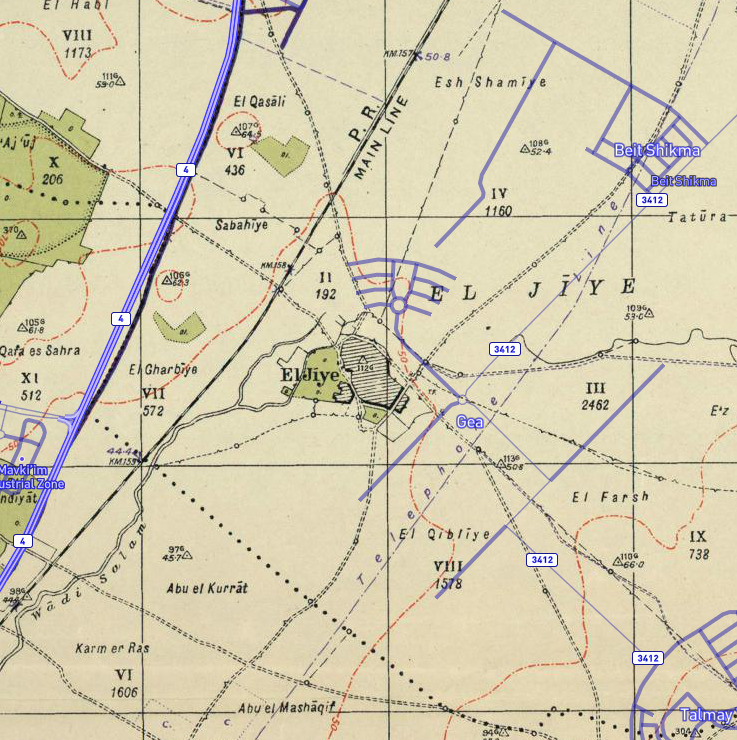
- 1870s map 1940s map modern map 1940s with modern overlay map A series of historical maps of the area around Al-Jiyya (click the buttons)

- Location within Mandatory Palestine
- Coordinates: 31°37′46″N 34°35′53″E
- Palestine grid: 111/115
- Geopolitical entity: Mandatory Palestine
- Subdistrict: Gaza
- Date of depopulation: November 4–5, 1948

Area
  - Total: 8.5 km^{2} (3.3 sq mi)

Population (1945)
  - Total: 1,230
- Cause(s) of depopulation: Military assault by Yishuv forces
- Current Localities: Beit Shikma, Ge'a

al-Jiyya (Arabic: الجية, also transliterated Algie) was a Palestinian village that was depopulated during the 1948 Arab-Israeli War. It was located 19 kilometers northeast of Gaza City and had a population of 1,230, according to a 1945 survey. The village was occupied by Israel's Giv'ati Brigade on 4 November 1948 during Operation Yoav.

== History ==
The village was situated on a sandy spot, surrounded by hills, on the southern coastal plain. Several wadis descended around it and it was periodically subjected to flooding. This, perhaps, explains its name, which means "water collector" in Arabic. The village has been identified with a town referred to in the Crusader records as "Algie".

Among the archaeological remains found in al-Jiyya were a stone column and the remains of a Roman mill.

=== Ottoman era ===
During the 17th and 18th centuries, the area of al-Jiya experienced a significant process of settlement decline due to nomadic pressures on local communities. The residents of abandoned villages moved to surviving settlements, but the land continued to be cultivated by neighboring villages. The villagers reported that their village had been ruined at one point and then rebuilt by Muhammed Aby Nabbut, the governor of Jaffa and Gaza between 1807 and 1818.

In 1838, Edward Robinson noted it under the name of Eljieh; located in the Gaza district.

In 1863 the French explorer Victor Guérin called the village Ed-Deir, and he estimated it had three hundred and fifty inhabitants. Near the wells he saw several parts of columns and one Corinthian capital, all made of gray-white marble. He further noted sycamores, pines and acacias mimosas, at intervals, in the middle of tobacco plantations. In 1883, the PEF's Survey of Western Palestine called it Ejjeh, and described it as "a moderate-sized mud village, with a pool to the north. On the east is a Sebil, or drinking-fountain. Beside the road to the west are olive groves."

=== British Mandate era ===
In the 1922 census of Palestine, conducted by the British Mandate authorities, Jiya had a population of 776 inhabitants, all Muslims, increasing in the 1931 census to 889, still all Muslims, in 188 houses.

Al-Jiyya's population had its own mosque. The children attended school in the neighboring village of Barbara. The villagers installed a pump on one of the wells in the area to draw water for domestic use. The villagers worked primarily in agriculture, planting various types of grain, especially corn. Al-Jiyya was known for its cheese and dairy products, which were sold in Gaza and in Majdal.

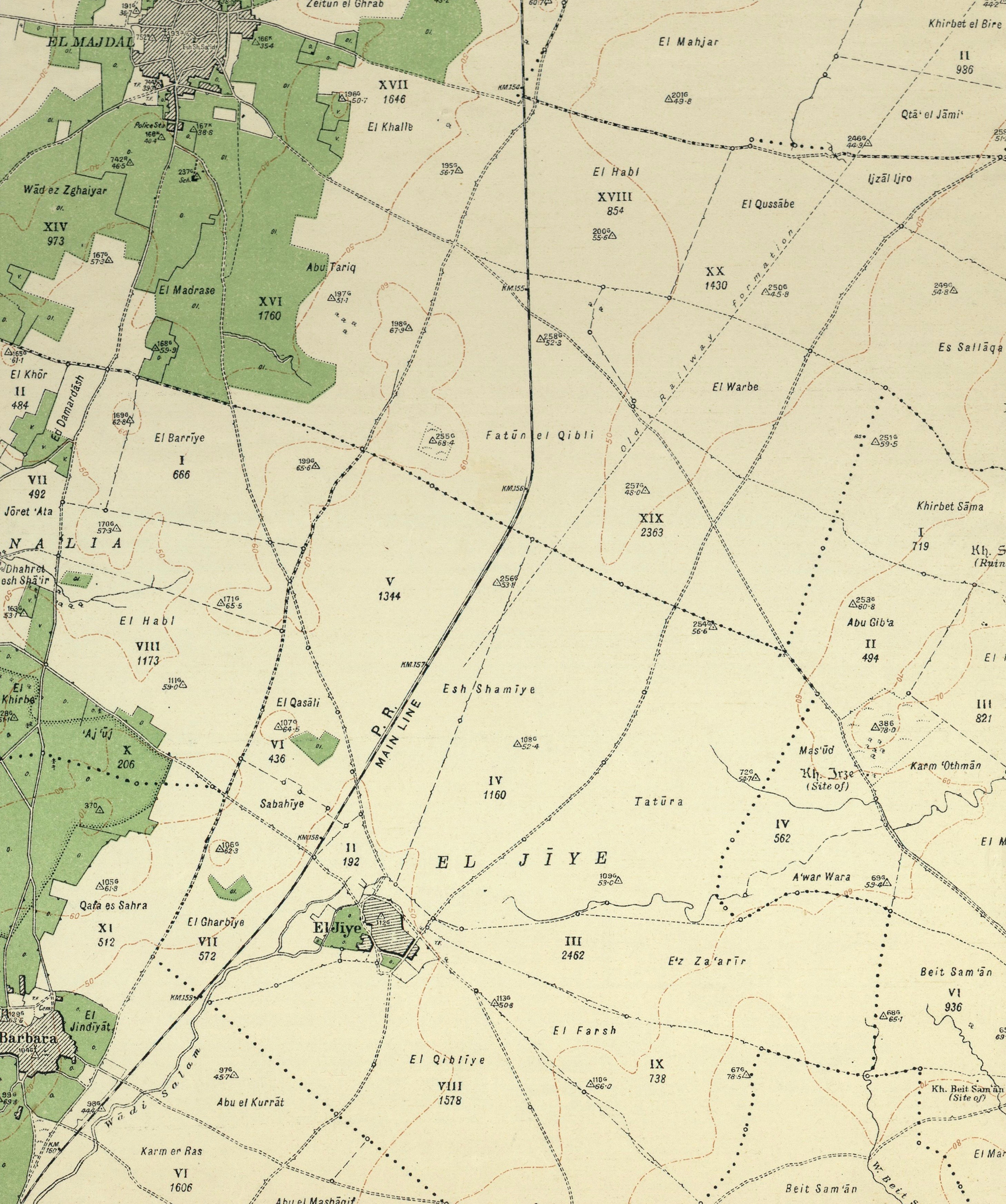
al Jiyya 1931 1:20,000

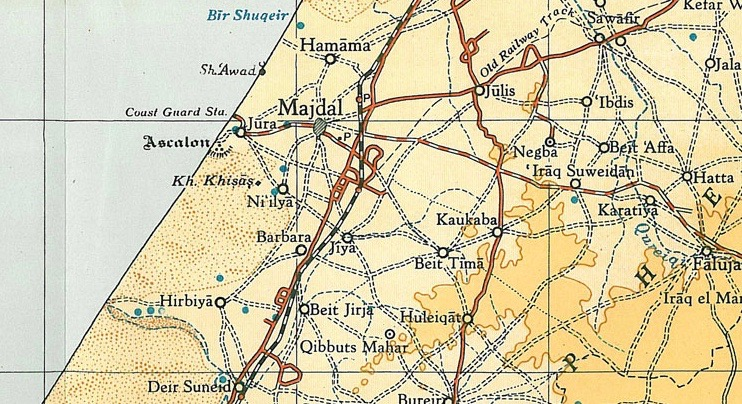
al Jiyya 1945 1:250,000

In the 1945 statistics El Jiya had a population of 1,230, all Muslims, with a total of 8,506 dunams of land, according to an official land and population survey. Of this, a total of 189 dunums was used for citrus and bananas, while 8,004 dunumus were allocated to cereals and 26 dunums were irrigated or used for orchards, while 45 dunams were built-up land.

=== 1948 War, and aftermath ===
The village was captured by Israel's Giv'ati Brigade on 4 November 1948 during Operation Yoav. At the end of November 1948, Coastal Plain District troops carried out sweeps of the villages around and to the south of Majdal. Al-Jiyya was one of the villages named in the orders to the IDF battalions and engineers platoon, that the villagers were to be expelled to Gaza, and the IDF troops were "to prevent their return by destroying their villages". The path leading to the village was to be mined. The IDF troops were ordered to carry out the operation "with determination, accuracy and energy". The operation took place on 30 November. The troops found "about 40" villagers in Barbara and al-Jiyya, "composed of women, old men and children", who offered no resistance. They were expelled to Beit Hanun, in the northern Gaza strip. Eight young men who were found were sent to a POW camp.

Following the war the area was incorporated into the State of Israel. Palestinian historian Walid Khalidi stated in 1992 that there were no traces of the village remaining and that the residents of moshav Beit Shikma had planted cantaloupes on the land.

== See also ==
- Barid, Muslim postal network strengthened in Palestine during the Mamluk period (roads, bridges, khans); it passed through Jiyya

== Bibliography ==
- Barron, J.B., ed. (1923). Palestine: Report and General Abstracts of the Census of 1922. Government of Palestine.
- Conder, C.R.; Kitchener, H.H. (1883). The Survey of Western Palestine: Memoirs of the Topography, Orography, Hydrography, and Archaeology. Vol. 3. London: Committee of the Palestine Exploration Fund.
- Department of Statistics (April 1945). Village Statistics, April, 1945 (PDF). Government of Palestine.
- Guérin, V. (1869). Description Géographique Historique et Archéologique de la Palestine (in French). Vol. 1: Judee, pt. 2. Paris: L'Imprimerie Nationale.
- Hadawi, S. (1970). Village Statistics of 1945: A Classification of Land and Area ownership in Palestine. Palestine Liberation Organization Research Center. Archived from the original on 8 December 2018.
- Karmon, Y. (1960). "An Analysis of Jacotin's Map of Palestine" (PDF). Israel Exploration Journal. 10 (3, 4): 155–173, 244–253. Archived from the original (PDF) on 22 December 2019.
- Khalidi, Walid, ed. (1992). All That Remains: The Palestinian Villages Occupied and Depopulated by Israel in 1948. Washington D.C.: Institute for Palestine Studies. ISBN 0-88728-224-5.
- Mills, E., ed. (1932). Census of Palestine 1931. Population of Villages, Towns and Administrative Areas. Jerusalem: Government of Palestine.
- Morris, B. (2004). The Birth of the Palestinian Refugee Problem Revisited. Cambridge University Press. ISBN 978-0-521-00967-6.
- Palmer, E.H. (1881). The Survey of Western Palestine: Arabic and English Name Lists Collected During the Survey by Lieutenants Conder and Kitchener, R. E. Transliterated and Explained by E.H. Palmer. Committee of the Palestine Exploration Fund.
- Robinson, E.; Smith, E. (1841). Biblical Researches in Palestine, Mount Sinai and Arabia Petraea: A Journal of Travels in the year 1838. Vol. 3. Boston: Crocker & Brewster.
