= Great Mosque of Ramla =

Mosque in Ramla, Central, Israel

- المسجد الكبير; המסגד הגדול ברמלה
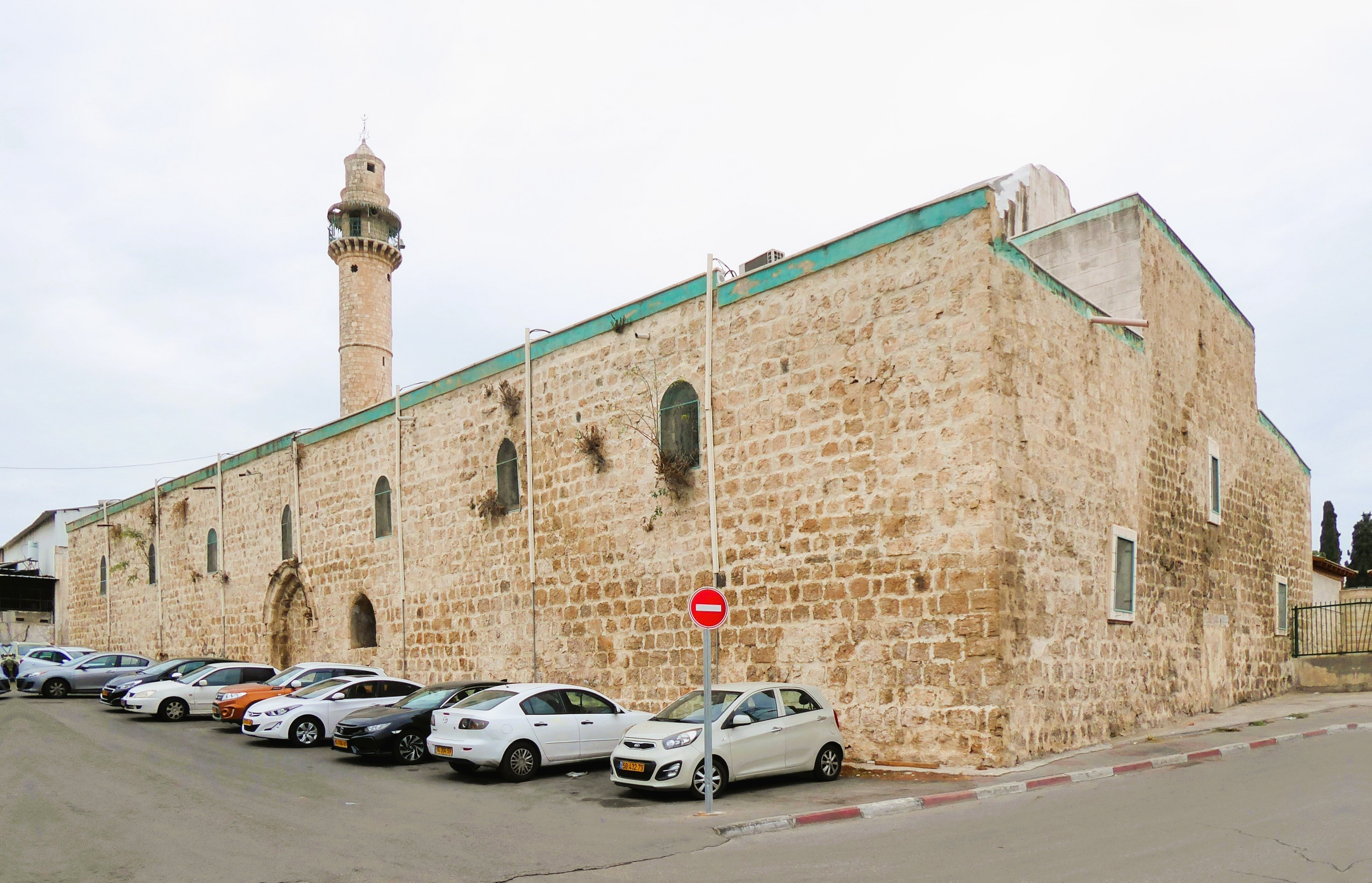
- The mosque in 2012

- Location of the mosque in central Israel

Religion
- Affiliation: Islam
- Branch/tradition: Sunni
- Ecclesiastical or organisational status: Church (12–13th century); Mosque (since 1266 CE)
- Status: Active

Location
- Location: Ramla, Central
- Country: Israel
- Interactive map of Great Mosque of Ramla
- Coordinates: 31°55′30″N 34°52′30″E

Architecture
- Type: Mosque architecture
- Style: Byzantine
- Completed: 12th century (as a church); 1266 CE (as a mosque)

Specifications
- Dome: One
- Minaret: One

The Great Mosque of Ramla (Arabic: المسجد الكبير, romanized: al-Masjid al-Kabīr; Hebrew: המסגד הגדול ברמלה) is a mosque in Ramla, in the Central District of Israel.

== Overview ==
The mosque was constructed in 12th century as a church. In 1266 CE, during the Mamluk Sultanate rule, the church was transformed into a mosque. A mihrab and minaret were added to the structure.

The mosque consists of three parallel halls, a nave and two transepts.

The mosque is accessible within walking distance south of Ramla Station of Israel Railways.

== See also ==
- Islam in Israel
- List of mosques in Israel
