= List of mosques in Israel =

This is a list of mosques in Israel.

== Geographic distribution ==
=== Central ===
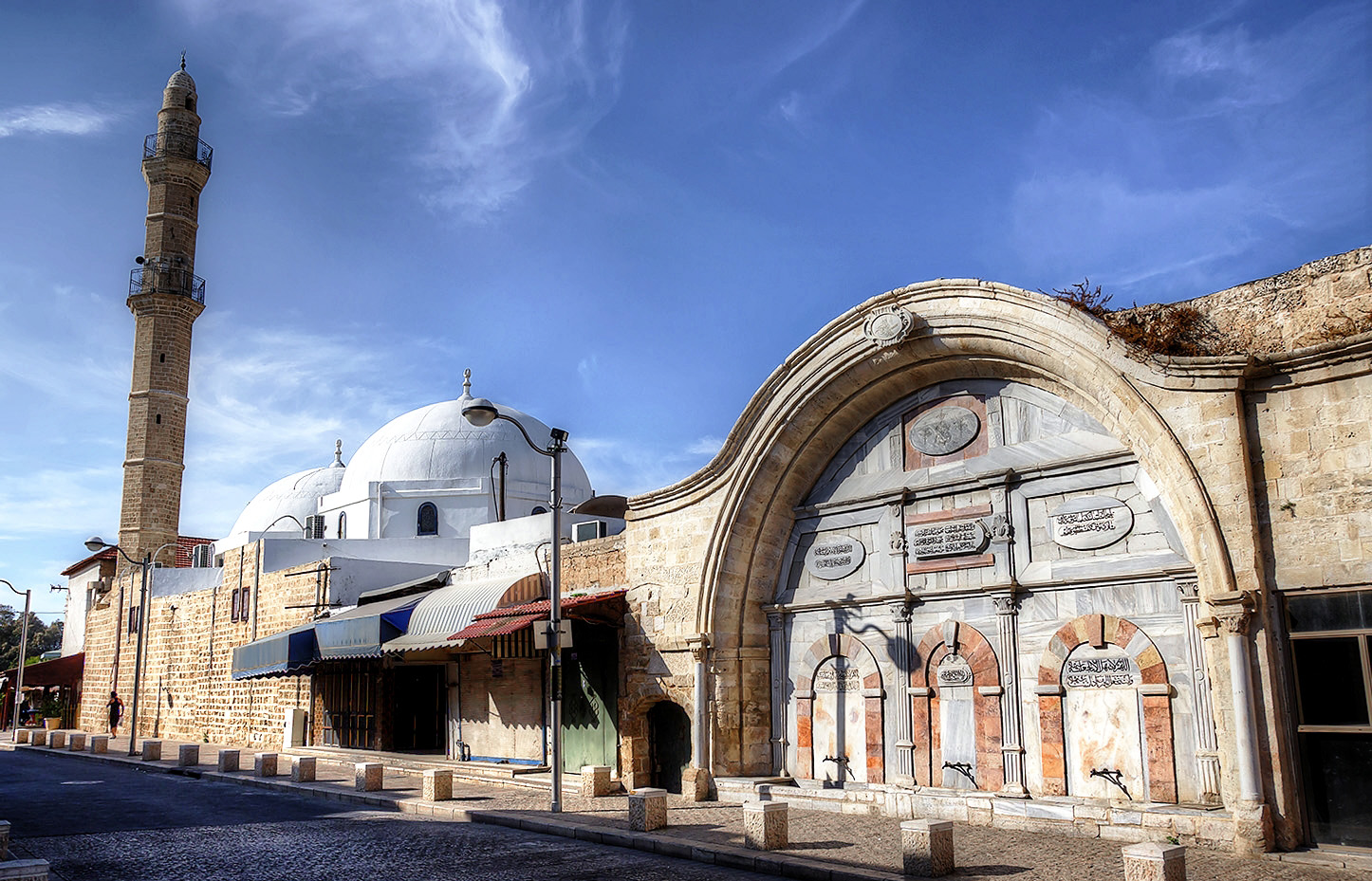
Mahmoudiya Mosque, Tel Aviv

- Sidna Ali Mosque – Herzliya
- Mosque of Al-Khadr – Lod
- Great Mosque of Ramla – Ramla
- White Mosque – Ramla
- Mosque of Ali ibn Abi Talib – Tayibe
- Mosque of Salahaddin al-Ayyubi – Tayibe
- Al-Bahr Mosque – Tel Aviv
- Hassan Bek Mosque – Tel Aviv
- Mahmoudiya Mosque – Tel Aviv
- Siksik Mosque – Tel Aviv
- Sidna Salama Mosque – Kfar Shalem

=== Jerusalem ===
West Jerusalem

- Nebi Akasha Mosque

=== North ===
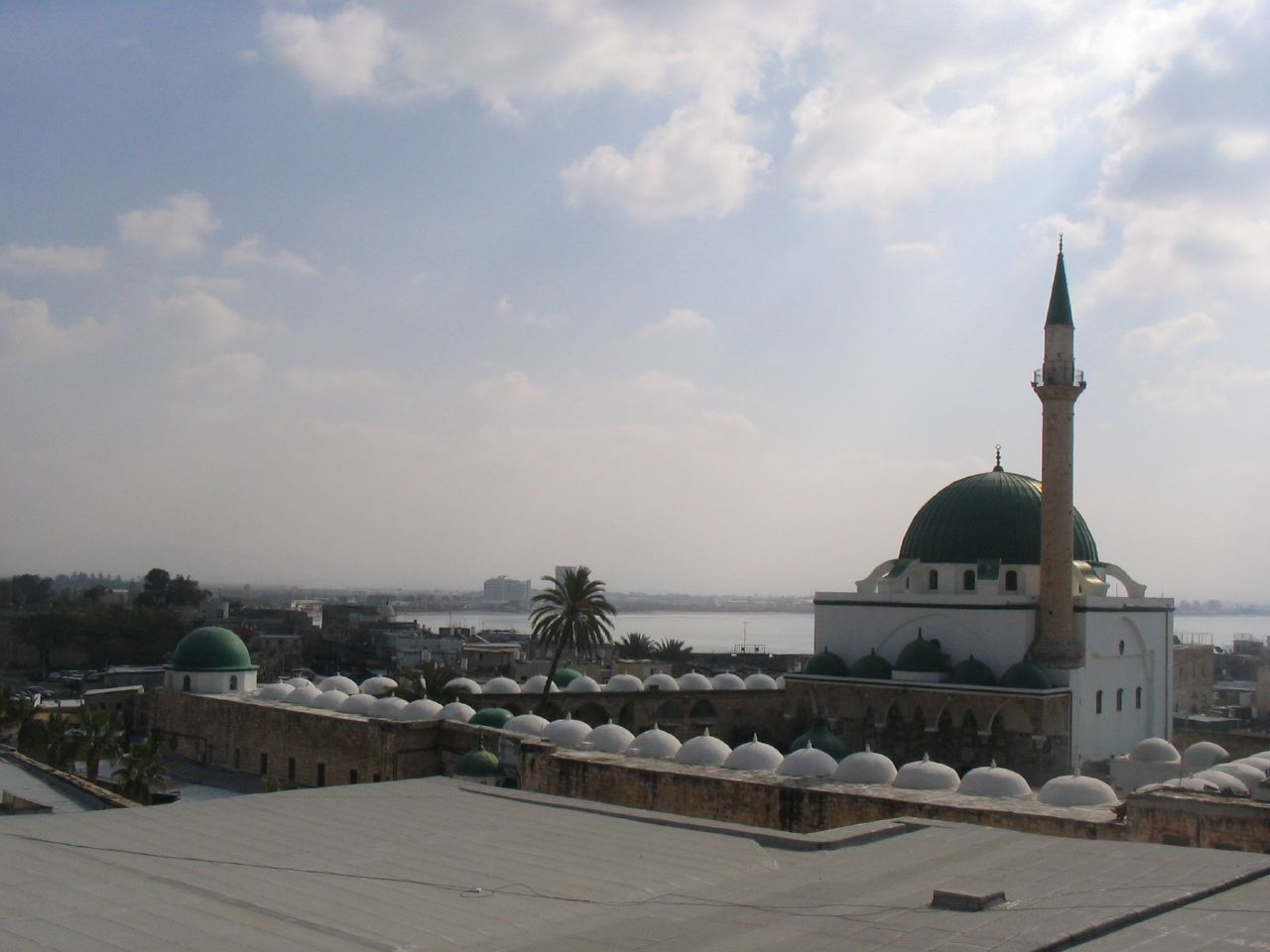
el-Jazzar Mosque, Acre

- el-Jazzar Mosque – Acre
- al-Muallaq Mosque – Acre
- Al-Jarina Mosque – Haifa (partially destroyed in June 2025)
- Mahmood Mosque – Haifa
- White Mosque – Nazareth
- Makam al-Nabi Sain Mosque – Nazareth
- Maqam an-Nabi Yusha' – Safed
- Mosque of Ali Ibn Abi Talib (Old Mosque) – Shefa-'Amr
- Sea Mosque –Tiberias
- The Great Mosque – Tiberias
- Khan Mosque – Tiberias

== See also ==
- Islam in Israel
- Lists of mosques
