= Mahmoudiya Mosque =

Mosque in Jaffa, Tel Aviv, Israel

- مسجد المحمودية מסגד מחמודיה
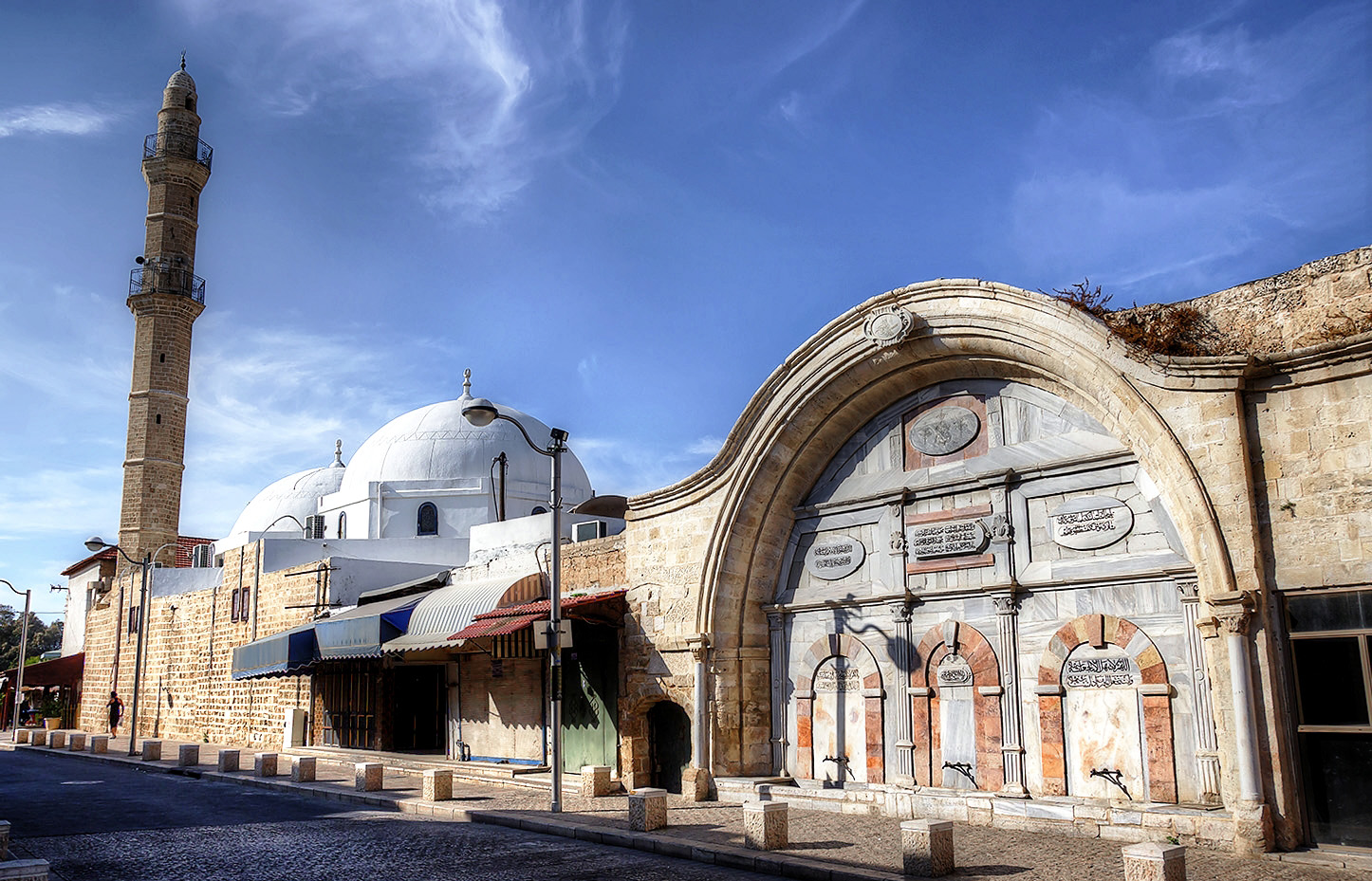

- Location of the mosque in Tel Aviv District, Israel

Religion
- Affiliation: Islam
- Branch/tradition: Sunni
- Ecclesiastical or organizational status: Mosque
- Status: Active

Location
- Location: 4 Ruslan Street, Jaffa, Tel Aviv
- Country: Israel
- Interactive map of Mahmoudiya Mosque
- Coordinates: 32°03′18″N 34°45′20″E

Architecture
- Type: Mosque architecture
- Style: Ottoman
- Founder: Sheikh Muhammad al-Khalili (1730); Muhammad Abu-Nabbut (1812)
- Groundbreaking: 1730 CE
- Completed: 1812

Specifications
- Dome: Six
- Minaret: One

The Mahmoudiya Mosque (Arabic: مسجد المحمودية; Hebrew: מסגד מחמודיה) is the largest and most significant mosque in Jaffa, Tel Aviv, in the Tel Aviv District of Israel. It is composed of a complex of buildings arranged around two large courtyards and a third, smaller, courtyard. The buildings, gates, and courtyards were built at different stages throughout the 18th and 19th centuries while Palestine was under Ottoman rule.

== History ==
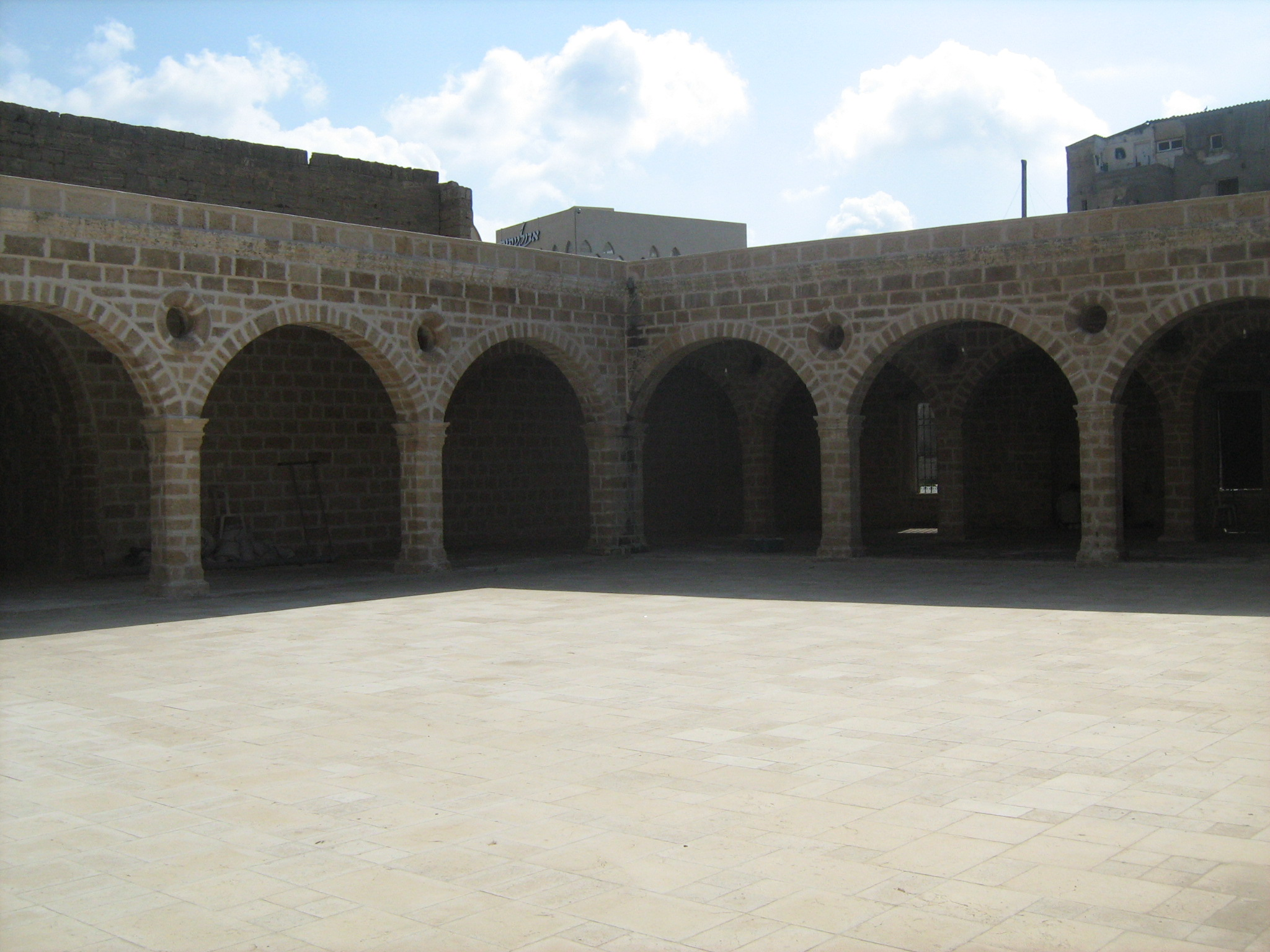
Courtyard of the mosque

Construction of the Mahmoudiya Mosque occurred in 1730 on the orders of governor Sheikh Muhammad al-Khalili. A sabil (fountain), embedded in the southern wall of the mosque, is attributed to Sulayman Pasha, governor of Acre in the late 18th and early 19th centuries.

Most of the current mosque was built in 1812 by the Ottoman governor of Gaza and Jaffa, Muhammad Abu-Nabbut. The main courtyard, located in the western part of the mosque, with its arcades and large rectangular prayer hall covered by two big shallow domes, and with its slender minaret are accredited to him. Traces of earlier construction are hardly noticeable, but research contends that Abu-Nabbut's mosque was built on the foundations of a smaller mosque that belonged to the Bibi family of Jaffa. The building reuses Roman columns from Caesarea and Ashkelon.

== Location ==
The Mahmoudiya Mosque used to occupy the northeast corner of Old Jaffa. In the middle of the 19th century, the walls of Jaffa were gradually dismantled, thus allowing for another major addition to the mosque to be made. Around the turn of the 20th century, the center of government moved to the east of the mosque, just outside the ancient walls. In order to facilitate access to the mosque from the government building, a new gate was built in the eastern wall of the mosque, facing the clock-tower plaza. The gate, named "the gate of the governors", reflects the design of Sabil Sulayman, built in Jerusalem in the 17th century by Suleiman the Magnificent.

Today, the exterior walls of the mosque are largely concealed by shops. However, in some places the two shallow domes of the prayer hall and the multitude of ancillary domes are still visible from the surrounding streets. The tall and refined silhouette of the minaret is still prominent in what remains of the fabric of Old Jaffa and its surroundings.

== Gallery ==
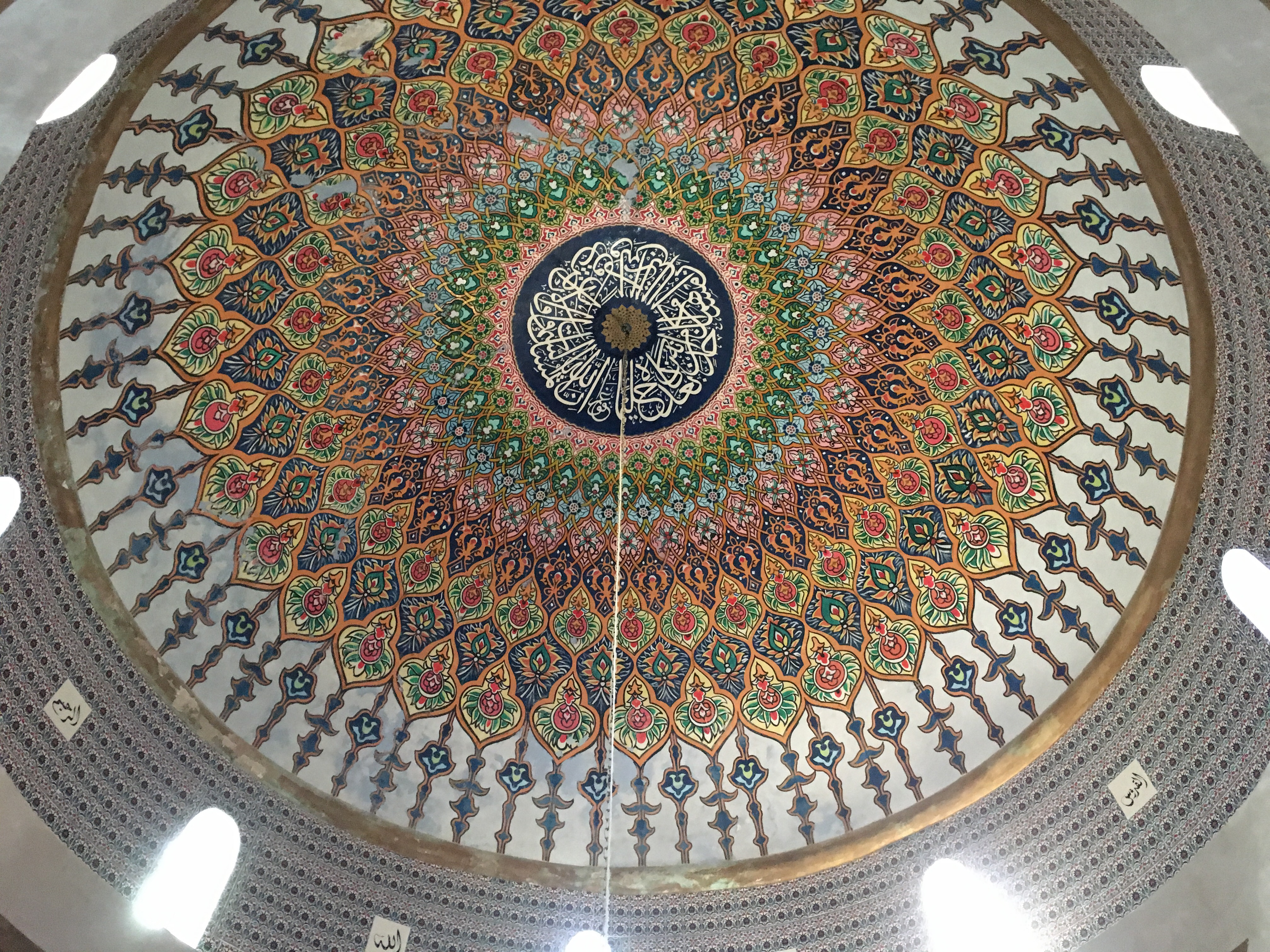
Dome

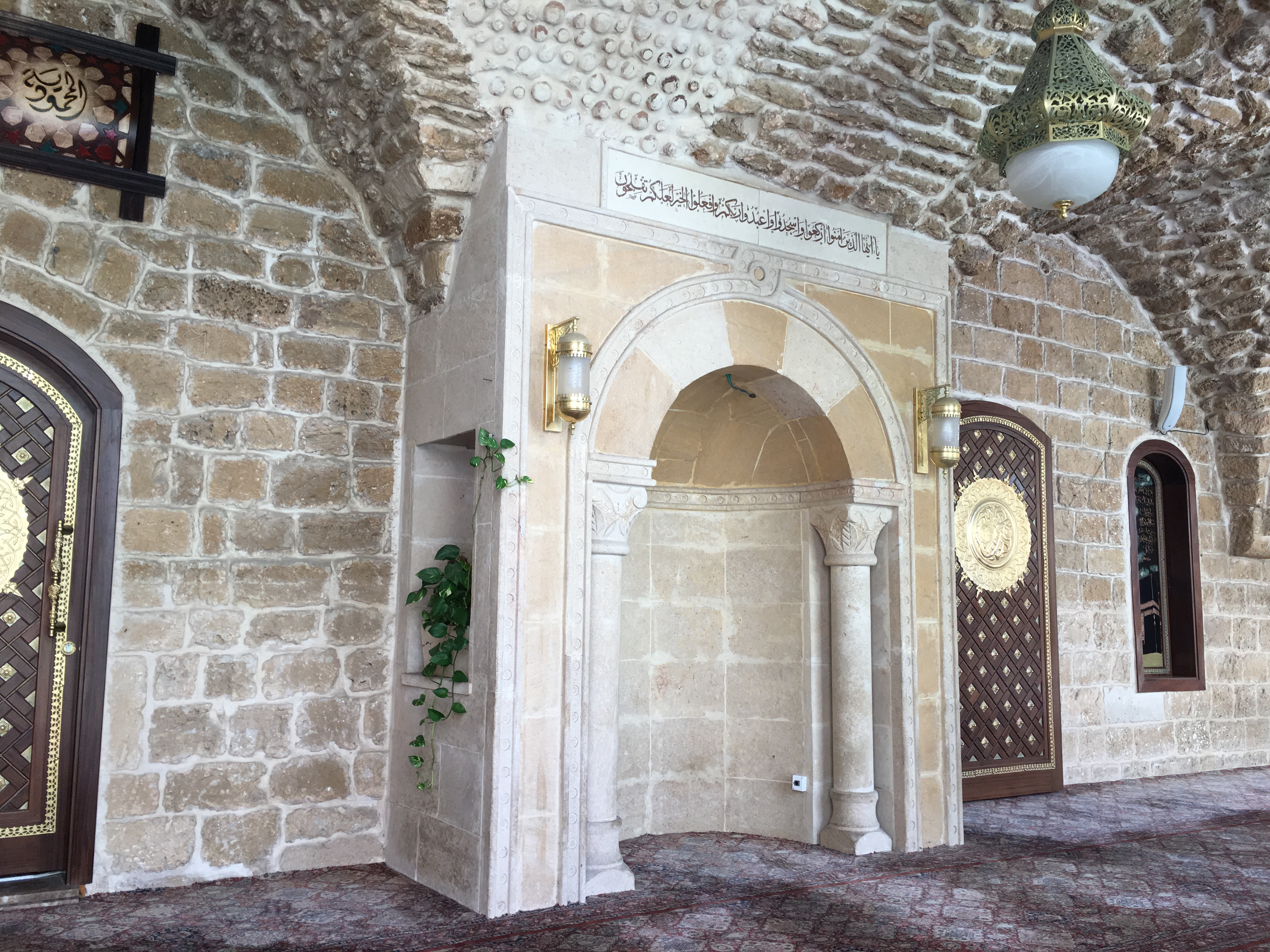
Mihrab

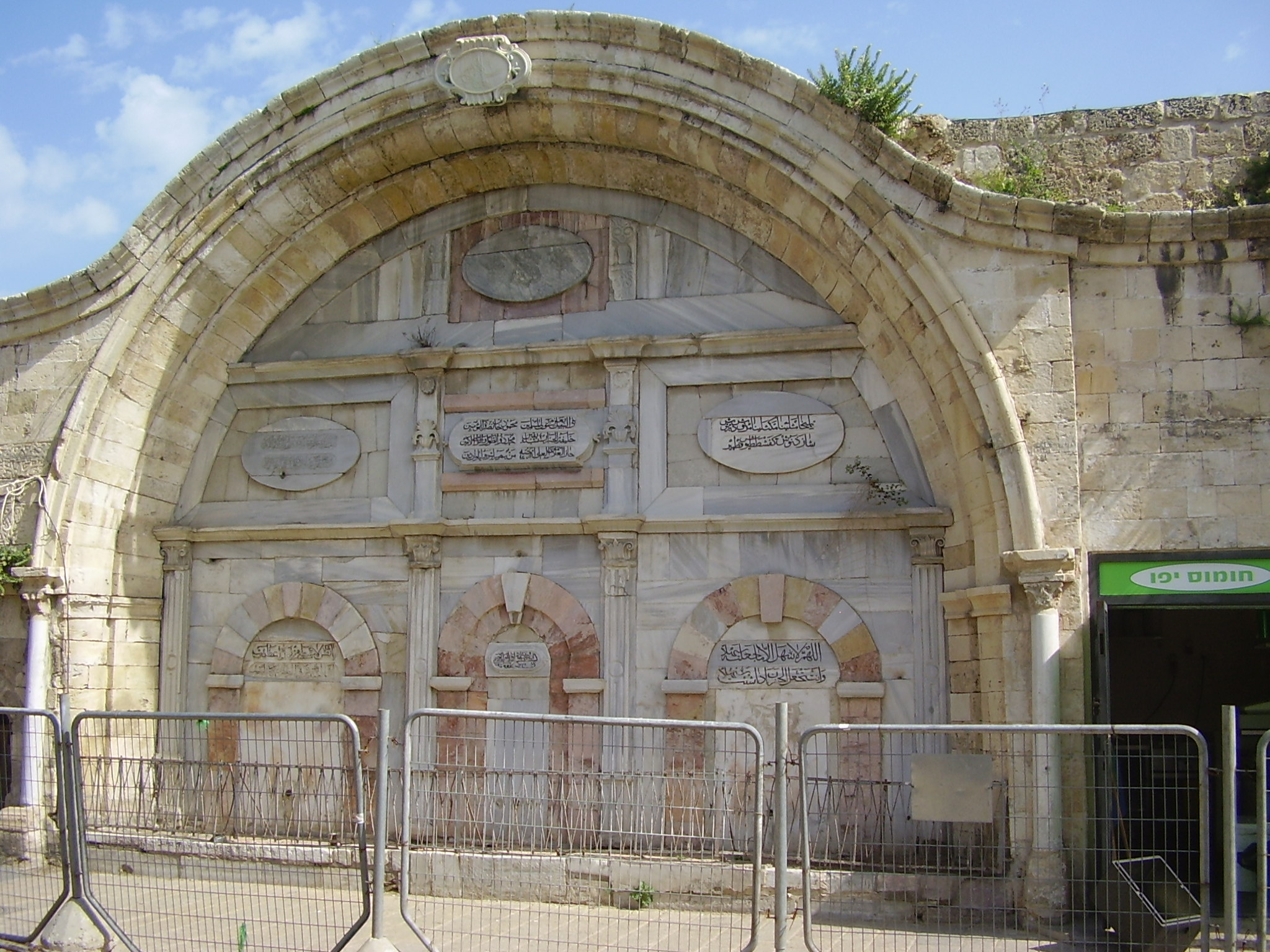
Sabil Suleiman

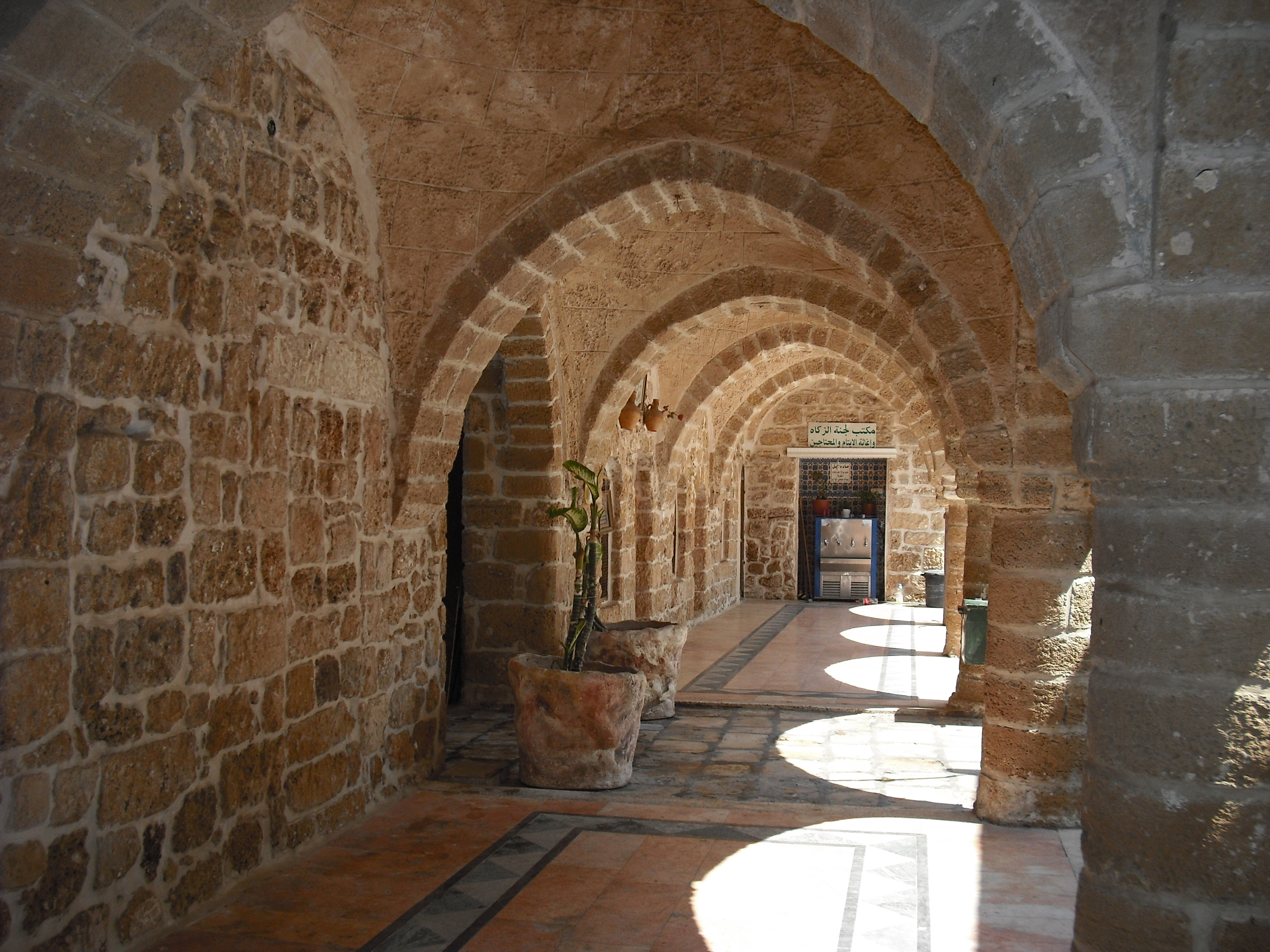
Inside of the mosque

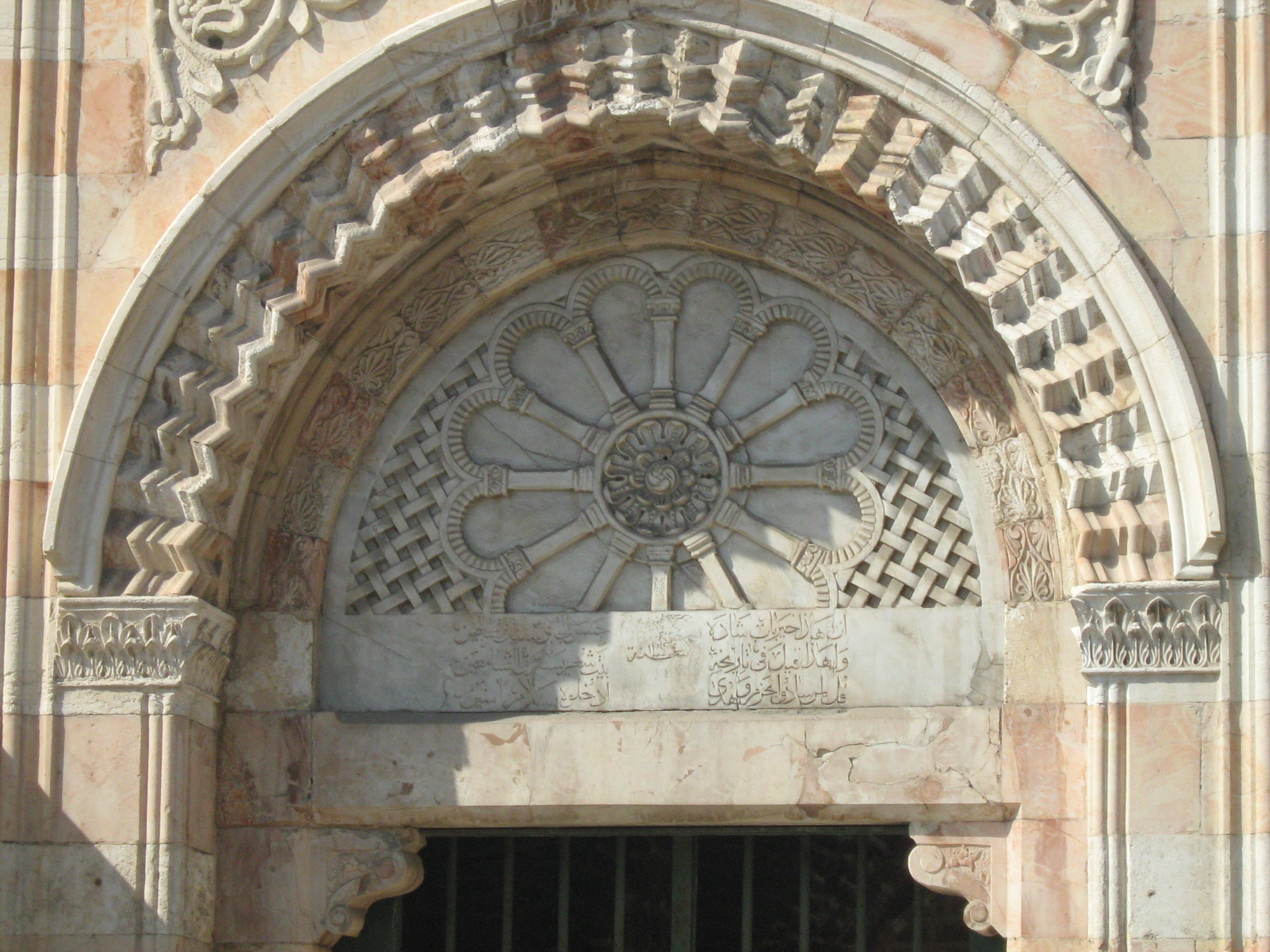
Ottoman design

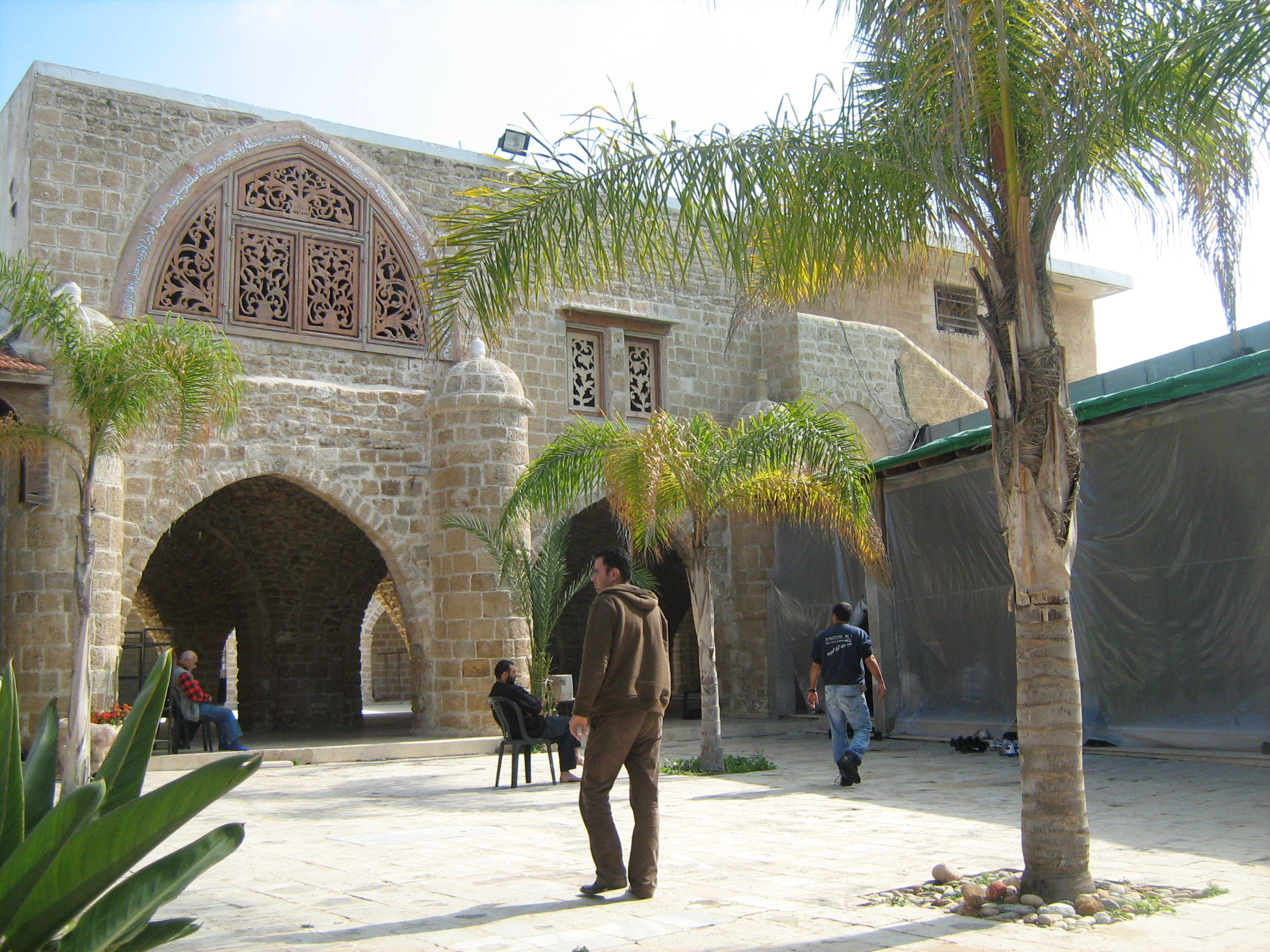
Front of the mosque

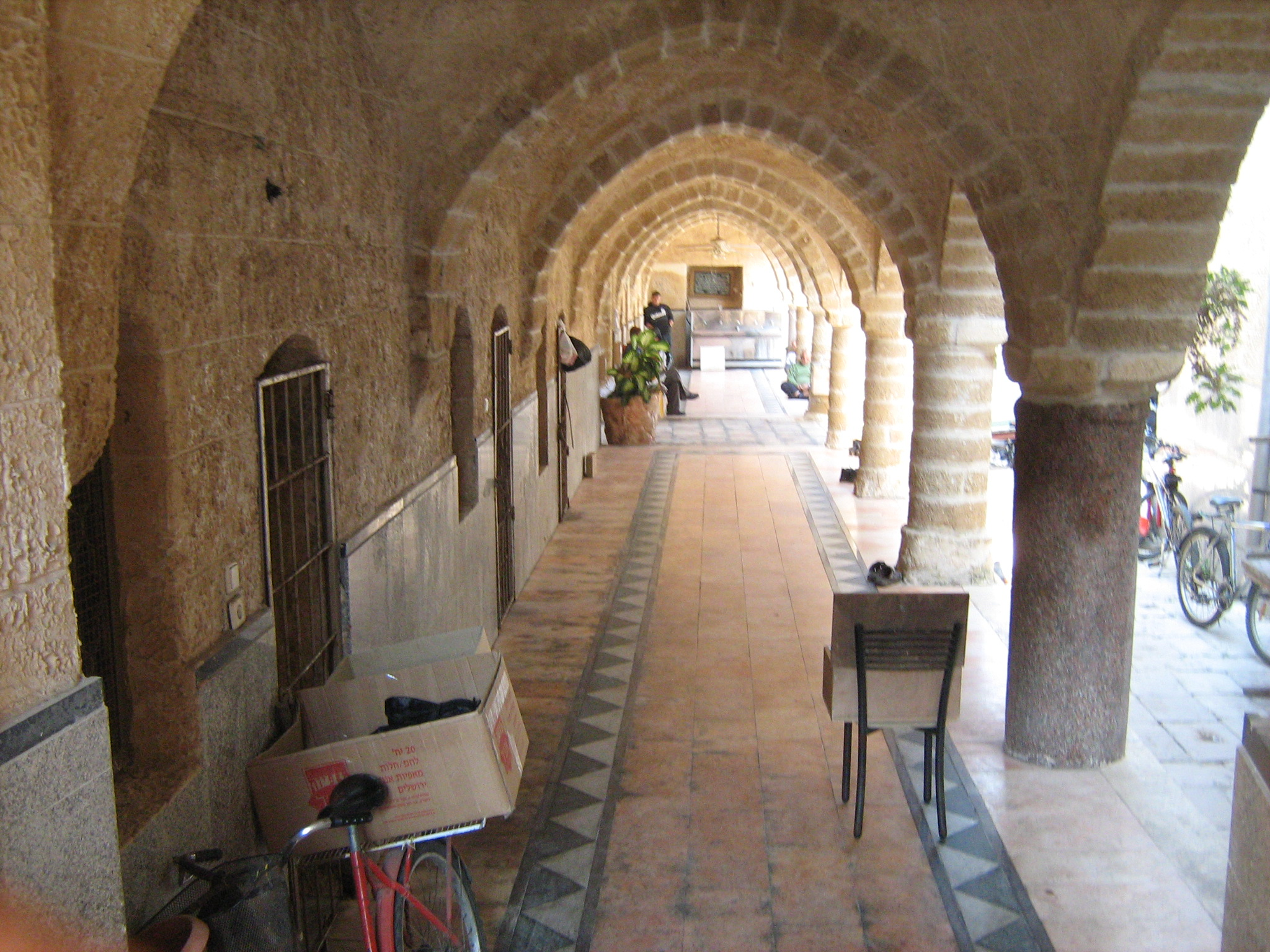
Corridor of the mosque

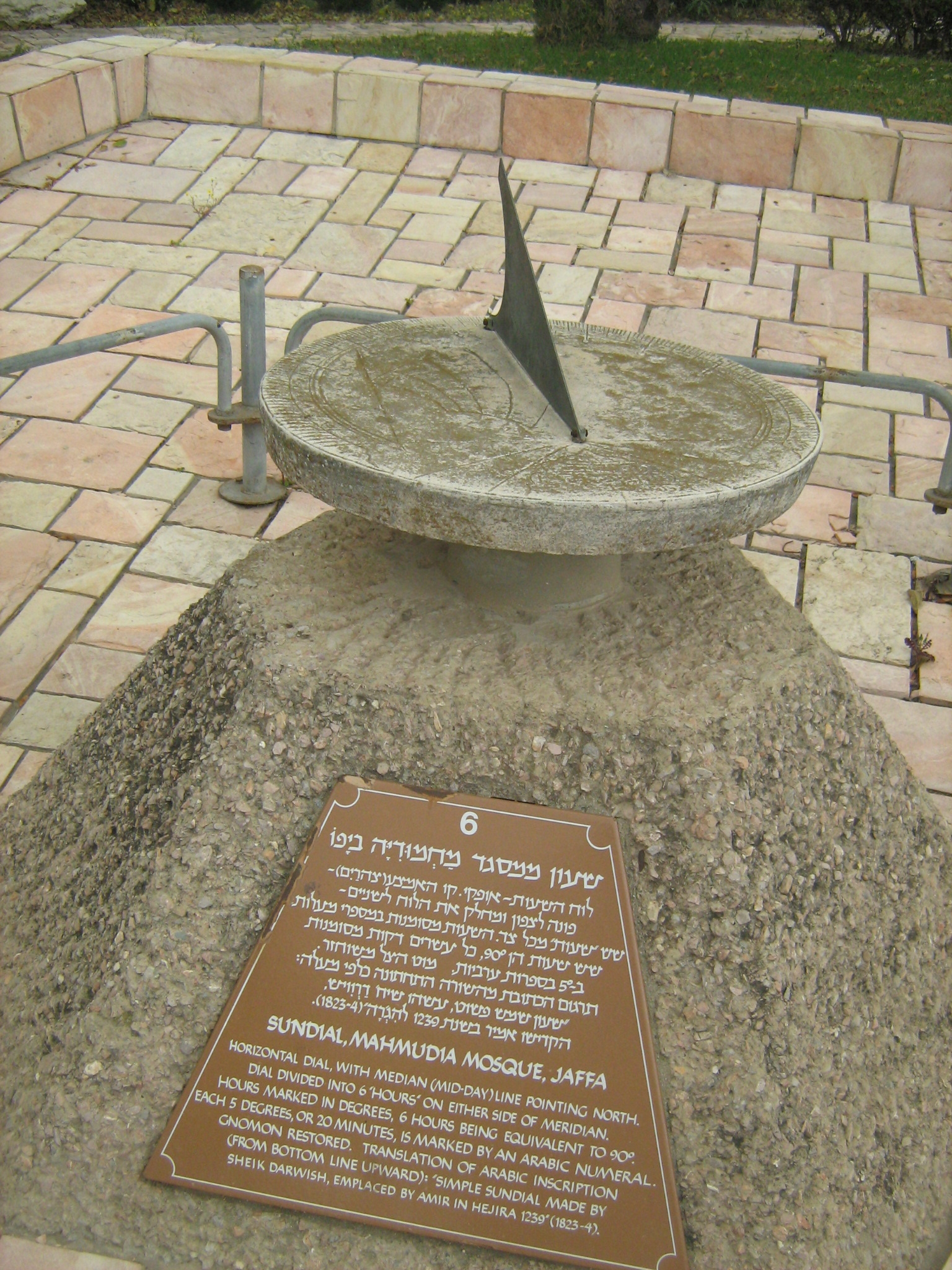
Sundial

Entrance of the mosque

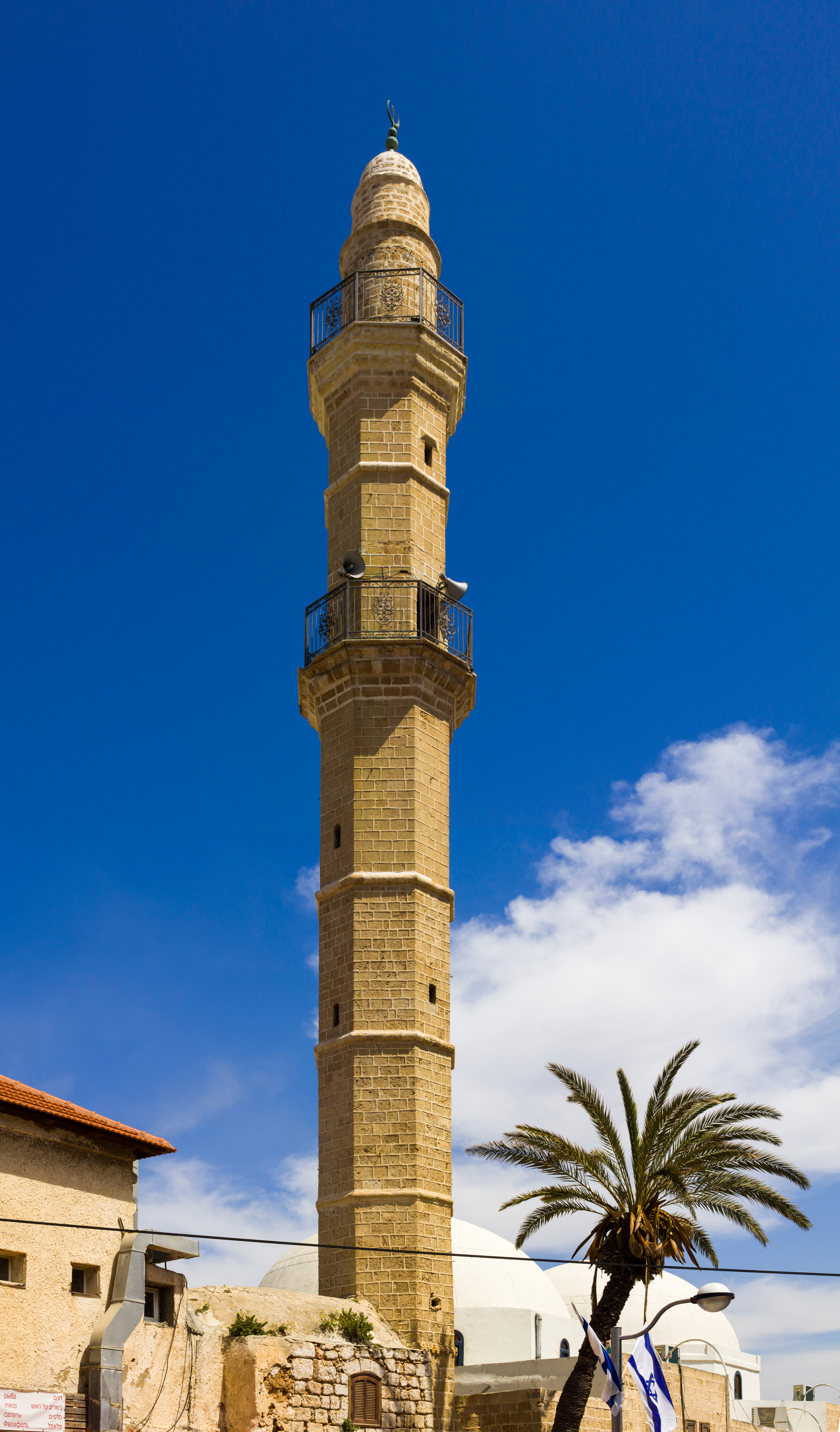
The minaret

== See also ==
- Islam in Israel
- List of mosques in Israel

== Bibliography ==
- Dumper, Michael; Stanley, Bruce E.; Abu-Lughod, J. (2007). Cities of the Middle East and North Africa: A Historical Encyclopedia. ABC-CLIO. ISBN 9781576079195.
- Kana`an, Ruba (2001). "Waqf, Architecture, and Political Self-Fashioning: The Construction of the Great Mosque of Jaffa by Muhammad Aga Abu Nabbut". In Necipoglu, Gülru (ed.). Muqarnas XVIII: An Annual on Islamic Art and Architecture. Leiden: E. J. Brill. Archived from the original (PDF) on June 4, 2011.)
- Petersen, Andrew (2001). A Gazetteer of Buildings in Muslim Palestine (British Academy Monographs in Archaeology). Vol. I. Oxford University Press. pp. 164−165. ISBN 978-0-19-727011-0.
