= Nabi Saeen Mosque =

Mosque in Nazareth, Northern, Israel

- مسجد النبي سعين מסגד נבי סעין
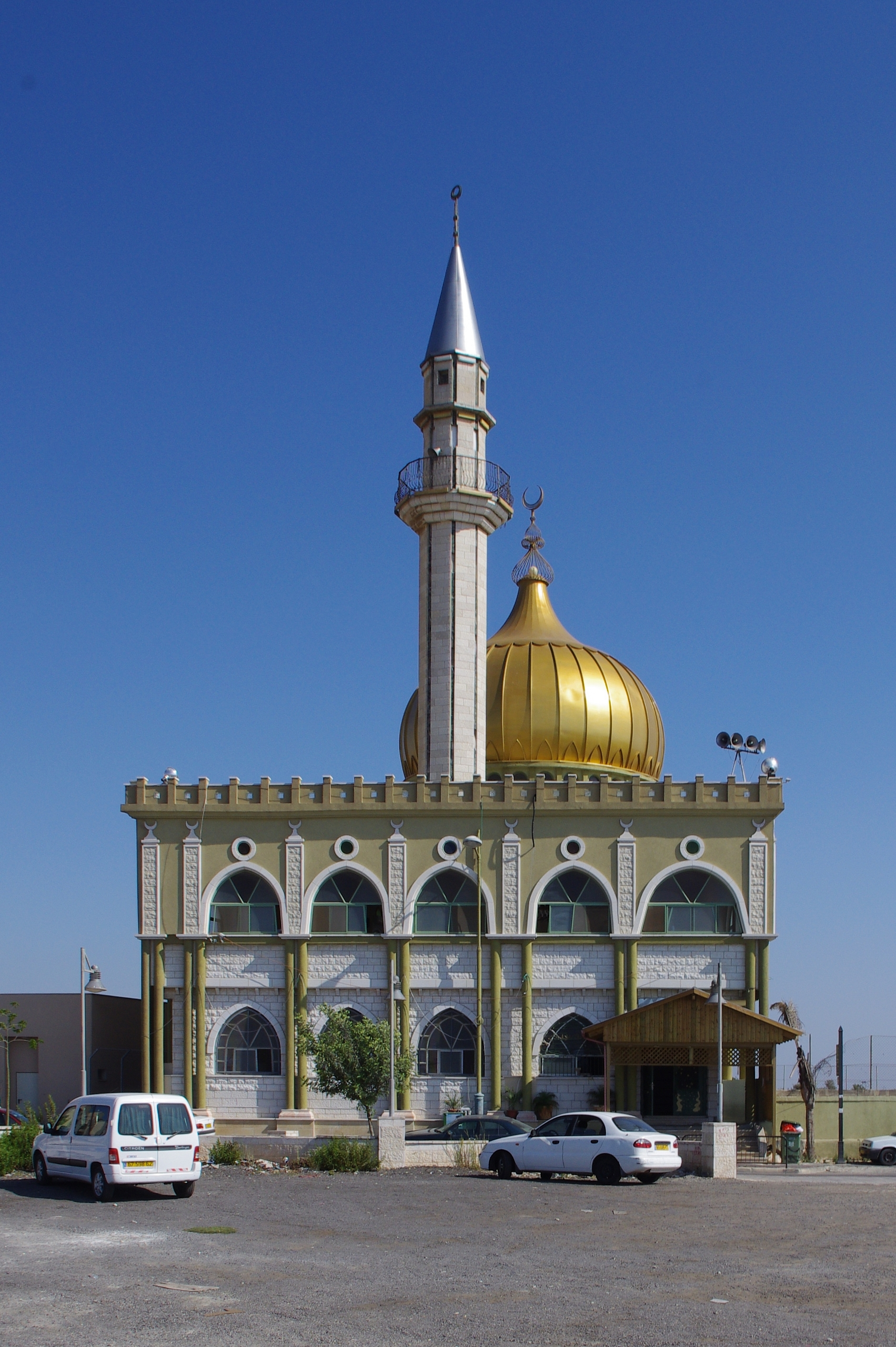

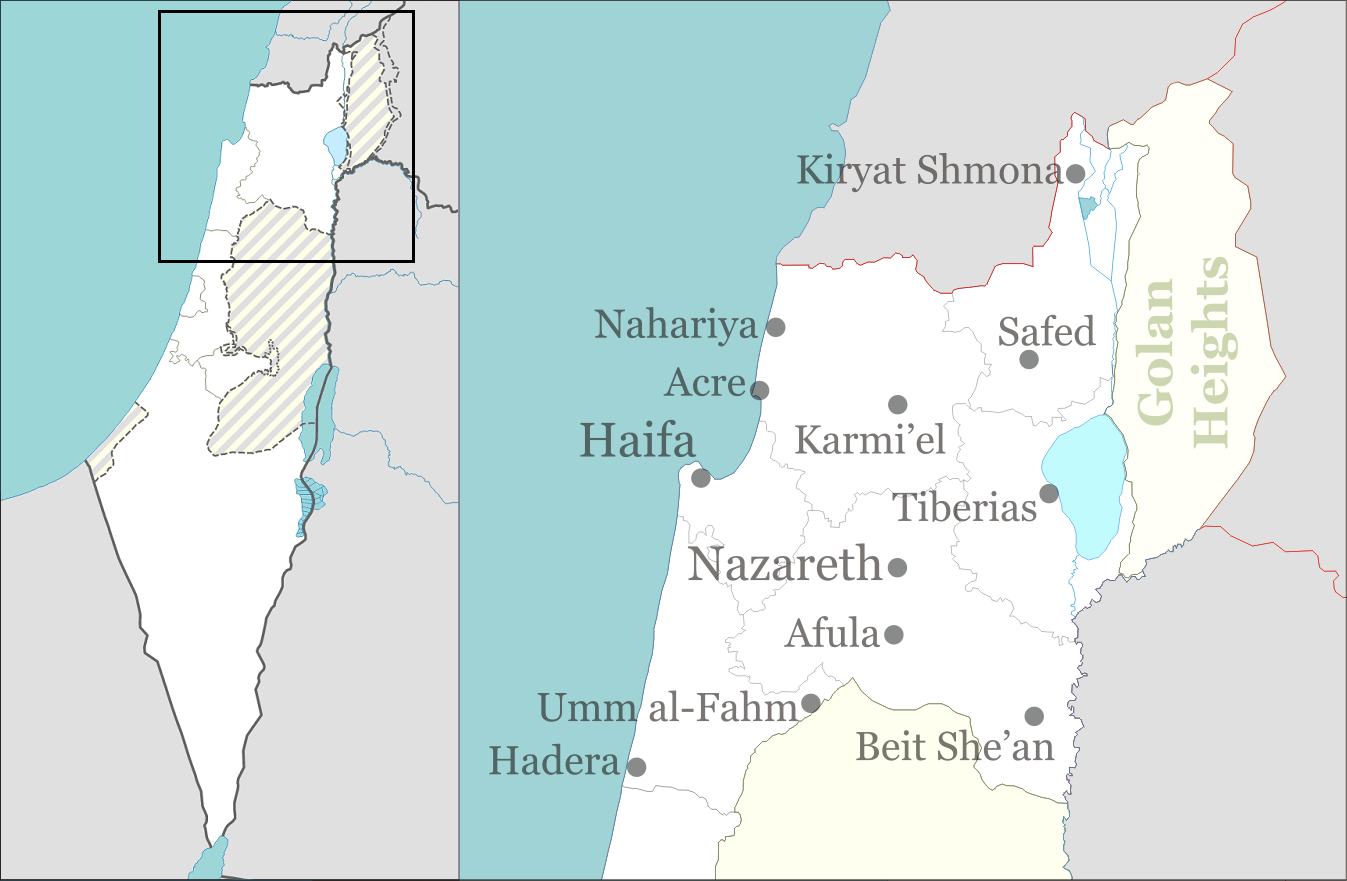
- Location of the mosque in northern Israel

Religion
- Affiliation: Islam
- Branch/tradition: Sunni
- Ecclesiastical or organizational status: Mosque
- Status: Active

Location
- Location: Nazareth, Northern District
- Country: Israel
- Interactive map of Nabi Saeen Mosque
- Coordinates: 32°42′31″N 35°17′43″E

Architecture
- Type: Mosque architecture
- Style: Ottoman
- Completed: 1812 CE

Specifications
- Length: 20 m (66 ft)
- Width: 20 m (66 ft)
- Dome: 1
- Minaret: 1
- Elevation: 487 m (1,598 ft)

The Nabi Saeen Mosque (Arabic: مسجد النبي سعين, romanized: Masjid al-Nabi Saʿīn; Hebrew: מסגד נבי סעין, romanized: Misgad Navi Sa'in) is a mosque located on Nabi Saeen Hill in Nazareth, in northern Israel. The mosque is located at the top of the ridge enclosing the city from the north, approximately 150 metres (490 ft) north of the Salesian Basilica of Jesus the Adolescent, providing a panoramic view of Nazareth and the Jezreel Valley to the south, and the Upper Galilee and Haifa outskirts (Krayot) to the north and west.

== Name ==
The mosque is located at an elevation of 487 metres (1,598 ft) above sea level, and is named for the hill on which it sits, which is officially romanized Nabi Saeen on local signs. It has also been variously rendered as En Nabi Sa'id, Neby Sȧîn, Neby Sain, and Mt Oaber Simani. It is apparently a local corruption of Isaiah, normally rendered Isha'ya' in Arabic (أشعياء).

== Architecture ==
The mosque is a two-storey structure in the shape of a trapezoid and is 20 metres (66 ft) long and 20 metres (66 ft) wide at its base. Near the northern front, facing the street, stands an octagonal minaret balcony where four windows surround the high tower, a spire in sharp grey. The front of the second floor is painted in bright green, and has the form of five arches over windows, each a small circular window (similar style windows surround the second floor on all sides). The entire facade is divided into seven parts, including seven separate pairs of narrow columns painted green on the first floor.

The first floor entrance leads into an open corridor on the other side, stretching along the western facade of the building. The mosque is divided into several rooms, including a room which is considered the burial place of a sheikh (مقام, maqām; מקאם, maqām).

== Gallery ==
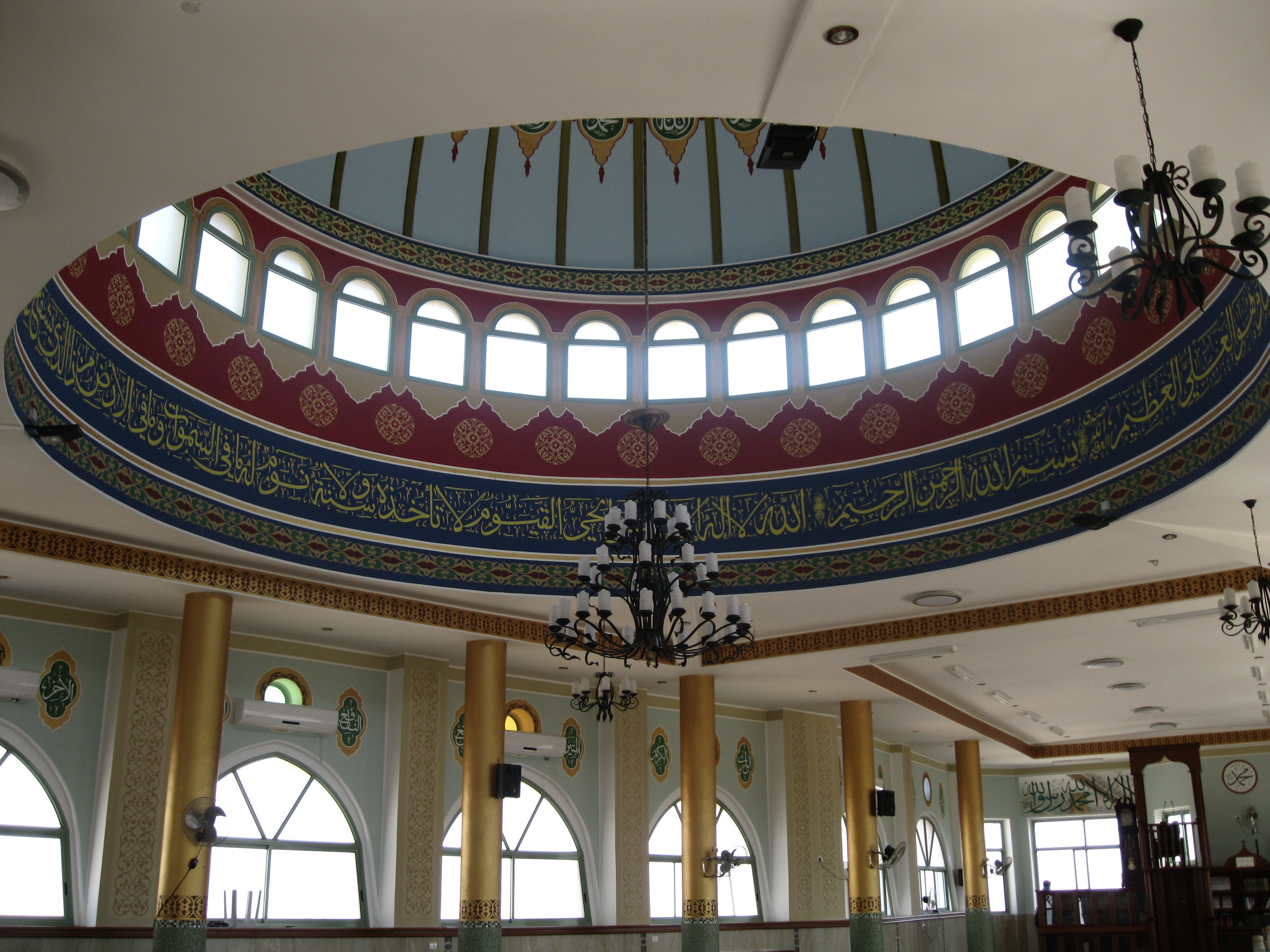
Interior

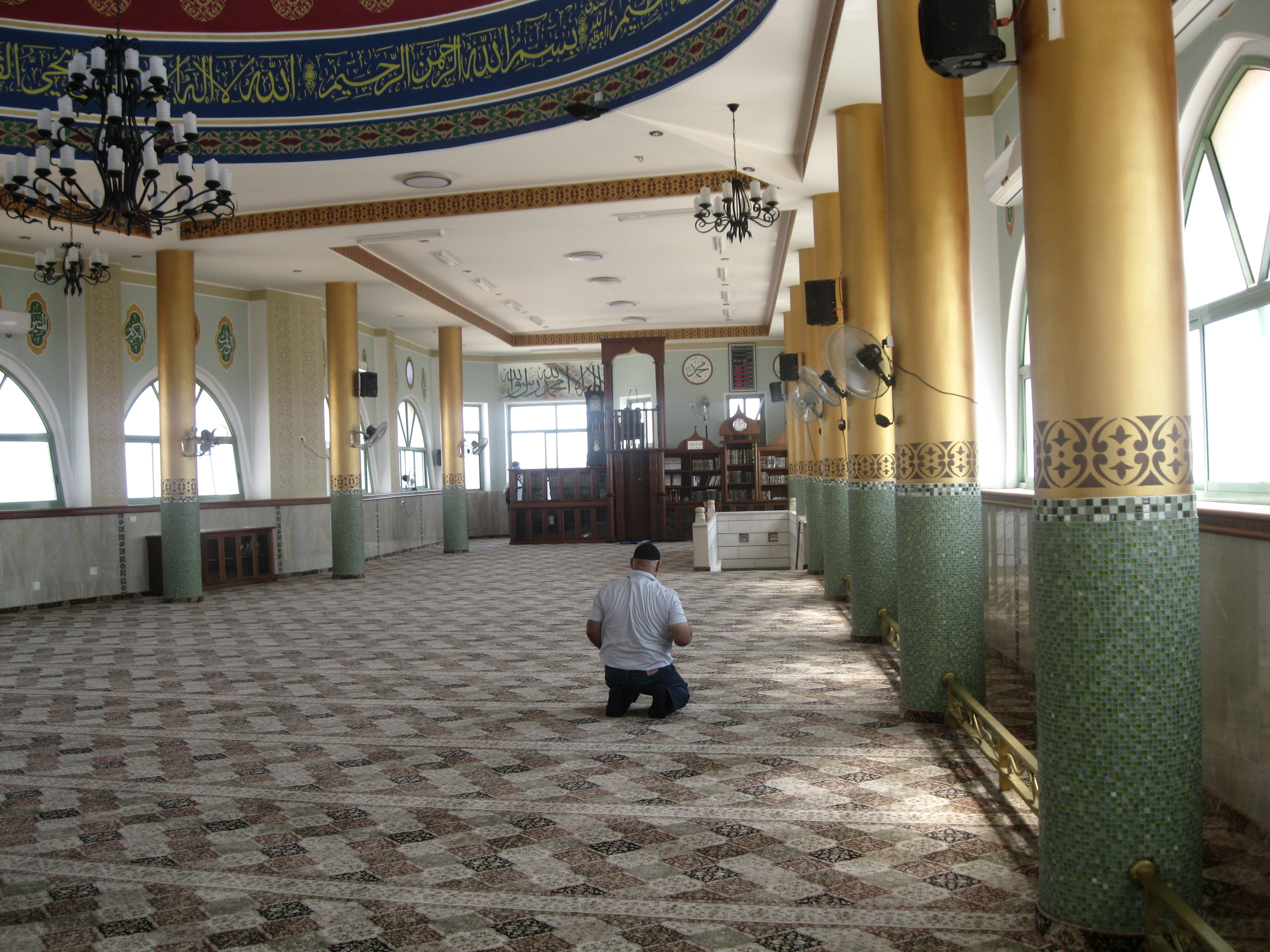
Interior

== See also ==
- Islam in Israel
- List of mosques in Israel
