= Nazareth =

Largest city in the Northern District of Israel

Nazareth الناصرة (Arabic) נצרת (Hebrew)
- City
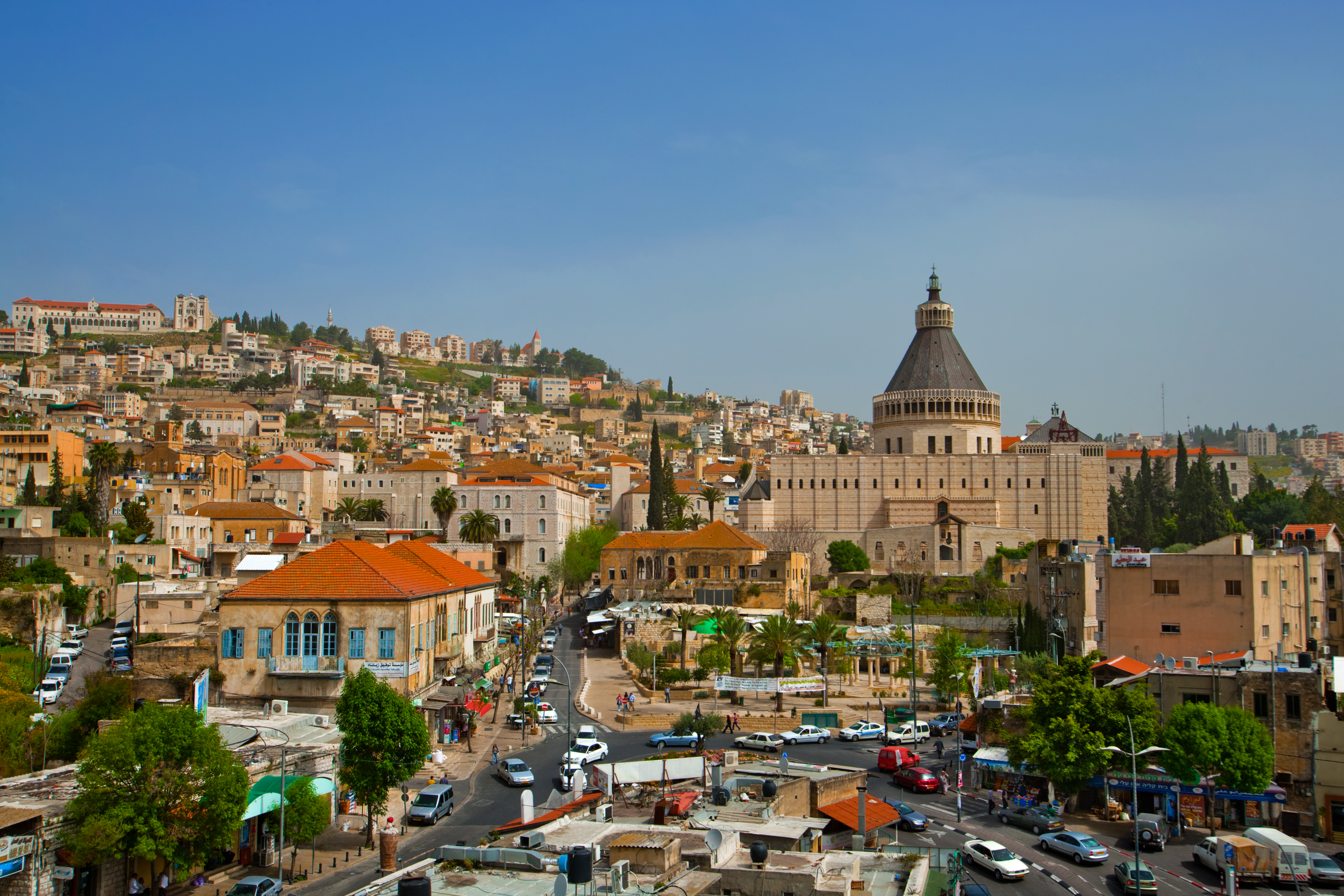
- View of Nazareth, with the Basilica of the Annunciation at the center

- Seal

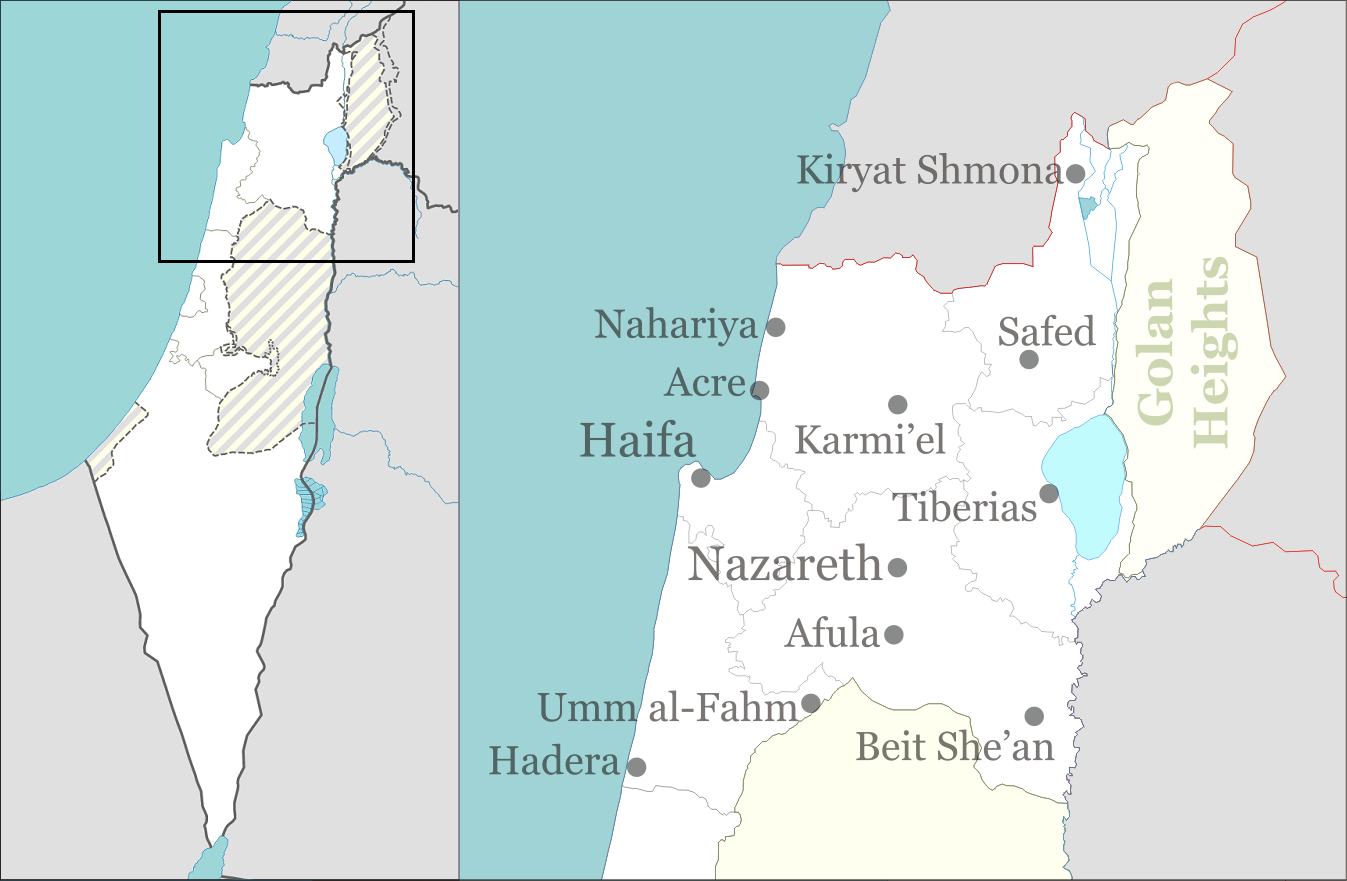
- Location of Nazareth in Northern Israel Location of Nazareth in Israel
- Coordinates: 32°42′07″N 35°18′12″E
- Country: Israel
- District: Northern
- Subdistrict: Jezreel
- Natural Region: Nazareth-Tir'an Mountains
- Founded: 2200 BC (early settlement); AD 300 (major city)
- Municipality: Established 1885

Government
  - Type: Mayor–council
  - Body: Municipality of Nazareth
  - Mayor: Yaakov Efrati

Area
  - Total: 14.123 km^{2} (5.453 sq mi)
- Elevation: 347 m (1,138 ft)

Population (2024)
  - Total: 75,704
  - Density: 5,300/km^{2} (13,800/sq mi)
- Demonym: Nazarene

Ethnicity
  - Arabs: 99.8%
  - Jews and others: 0.2%
- Time zone: UTC+2 (IST)
  - Summer (DST): UTC+3 (IDT)
- Area code: +972 (Israel)
- Website: www.nazareth.muni.il

Nazareth (Note: /ˈnæzərəθ/ NAZ-ər-əth; Arabic: النَّاصِرَة, romanized: an-Nāṣira; Hebrew: נָצְרַת, romanized: Nāṣraṯ; Syriac: ܢܨܪܬ, romanized: Naṣrath) is the largest city in the Northern District of Israel. In 2024 its population was 75,704. Known as "the Arab capital of Israel", Nazareth serves as a cultural, political, religious, economic and commercial center for the Arab citizens of Israel. The inhabitants are predominantly Arabs, of whom 69% are Muslim and 31% Christian. The city commands immense religious significance, deriving from its status as the hometown of Jesus, who is the central figure of Christianity and considered a prophet in Islam and the Baháʼí Faith.

Findings unearthed in the neighboring Qafzeh Cave show that the area around Nazareth was populated in the prehistoric period. Nazareth was a Jewish village during the Roman and Byzantine periods, and is described in the New Testament as the childhood home of Jesus. It became an important city during the Crusades after Tancred established it as the capital of the Principality of Galilee. The city declined under Mamluk rule and, following the Ottoman conquest, the city's Christian residents were expelled, only to return once Fakhr ad-Dīn II granted them permission to do so. In the 18th century, Daher al-Umar transformed Nazareth into a large town by encouraging immigration to it. The city grew steadily during the late 19th and early 20th centuries, when European powers invested in the construction of churches, monasteries, educational and health facilities.

Since late antiquity, Nazareth has been a center of Christian pilgrimage, with many shrines commemorating biblical events. The Church of the Annunciation is considered one of the largest Christian sites of worship in the Middle East. It contains the Grotto of the Annunciation, where, according to Catholic tradition, angel Gabriel appeared to Mary and announced that she would conceive and bear Jesus. According to Greek Orthodox belief, that event occurred at the Greek Orthodox Church of the Annunciation, also known as the Church of Saint Gabriel. Other important churches in Nazareth include the Synagogue Church, St. Joseph's Church, the Mensa Christi Church, and the Basilica of Jesus the Adolescent.

== Etymology ==
=== Hebrew Netzer ===
One view holds that the name 'Nazareth' is derived from one of the Hebrew words for 'branch', namely ne·ṣer, נֵ֫צֶר, (Note: The other is צֶמַח tsémakh.) and alludes to the prophetic, messianic words in Book of Isaiah 11:1: "from (Jesse's) roots a Branch [netzer] will bear fruit". One view suggests this toponym might be an example of a tribal name used by resettling groups on their return from exile. Alternatively, the name may derive from the verb na·ṣar, נָצַר, 'watch, guard, keep", and understood either in the sense of 'watchtower' or 'guard place', implying the early town was perched on or near the brow of the hill, or, in the passive sense as 'preserved, protected' in reference to its secluded position. The negative references to Nazareth in the Gospel of John suggest that ancient Jews did not connect the town's name to prophecy.

=== Greek Nazara from an Aramaic/Semitic root ===
Another theory holds that the Greek form Ναζαρά (Nazará), used in the Gospel of Matthew and Gospel of Luke, may derive from an earlier Aramaic form of the name, or from another Semitic language form. If there were a tsade (צ) in the original Semitic form, as in the later Hebrew forms, it would normally have been transcribed in Greek with a sigma (σ) instead of a zeta (ζ). This has led some scholars to question whether "Nazareth" and its cognates in the New Testament actually refer to the settlement known traditionally as Nazareth in Lower Galilee. Such linguistic discrepancies may be explained, however, by "a peculiarity of the 'Palestinian' Aramaic dialect wherein a sade (ṣ) between two voiced (sonant) consonants tended to be partially assimilated by taking on a zayin (z) sound".

=== Arabic an-Nāṣira ===
The Arabic name for Nazareth is an-Nāṣira, and Jesus (Arabic: يَسُوع, romanized: Yasū') is also called an-Nāṣirī, reflecting the Arab tradition of according people an attribution, a name denoting whence a person comes in either geographical or tribal terms. In the Qur'an, Christians are referred to as naṣārā, meaning "followers of an-Nāṣirī", or "those who follow Jesus of Nazareth".

== New Testament references ==
In the Gospel of Luke, Nazareth is first described as "a town of Galilee" and home of Mary. Following the birth and early epiphanial events of chapter 2 of Luke, Mary, Joseph and Jesus "returned to Galilee, to their own city, Nazareth".

The phrase "Jesus of Nazareth" appears seventeen times in English translations of the New Testament, whereas the Greek original contains the form "Jesus the Nazarēnos" or "Jesus the Nazōraios." (Note: Ναζαρηνός ('Nazarene') and its permutations are at Mark 1:24; 10:47; 14:67; 16:6; Luke 4:34 and 24:19. Ναζωραῖος ('Nazōraean') and its permutations are at Matthew 2:23; 26:71; Luke 18:37; John 18:5, 7; 19:19; and six times in Acts of the Apostles.) One plausible view is that Nazōraios (Ναζωραῖος) is a normal Greek adaptation of a reconstructed, hypothetical term in Jewish Aramaic for the word later used in Rabbinical sources to refer to Jesus. (Note: According to G.F. Moore, the Hebrew Nôṣri, the gentilic used of Jesus from the Tannaitic period onwards, would have corresponded to a hypothetical Jewish Aramaic *Nōṣrāyā, which would have in turn produced *N^{e}ṣōrāyā. A normal adaptation of this in Greek would yield Nazoraios.) "Nazaréth" is named twelve times in surviving Greek manuscript versions of the New Testament, 10 times as Nazaréth or Nazarét, and twice as Nazará. The latter two may retain the 'feminine' endings common in Galilean toponyms. The minor variants, Nazarat and Nazarath are also attested. (Note: Nazarat/Nazarath are attested in a few Greek manuscripts, while the Syriac versions read Nazarath.) Within the New Testament, Nazareth is called Nazara (Ναζαρά) after the Aramaic form in Matthew 4:13 and Luke 4:16. However, the Textus Receptus clearly translates all passages as Nazara, leaving little room for debate there.

Many scholars have questioned a link between "Nazareth" and the terms "Nazarene" and "Nazoraean" on linguistic grounds, while some affirm the possibility of etymological relation "given the idiosyncrasies of Galilean Aramaic."

== Extrabiblical references ==
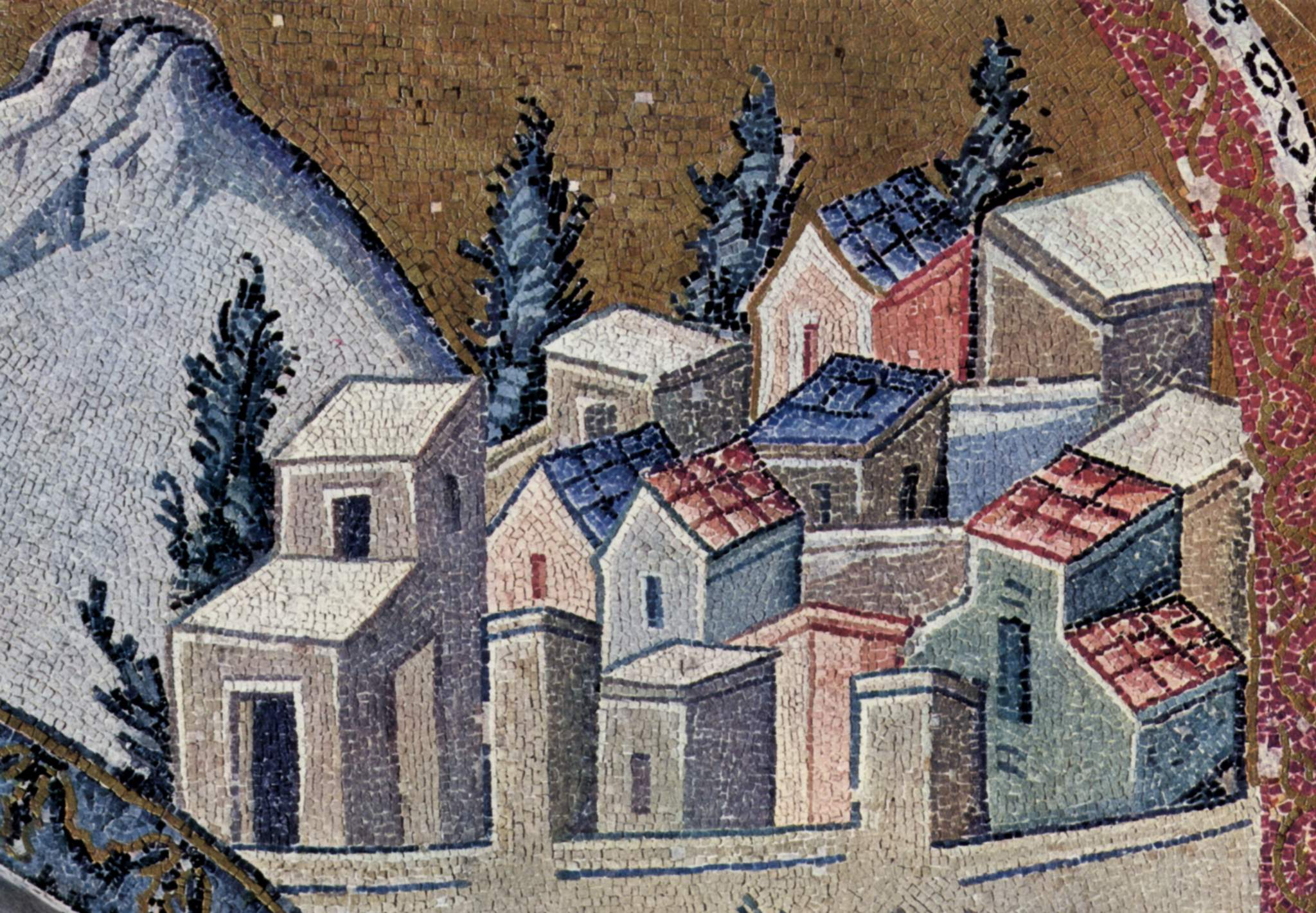
Nazareth as depicted on a Byzantine mosaic (Chora Church, Constantinople)

The form Nazara is also found in the earliest non-scriptural reference to the town, a citation by Sextus Julius Africanus dated about AD 221 (see "Middle Roman to Byzantine Periods" below). The Church Father Origen (c. AD 185 to 254) knows the forms Nazará and Nazarét. Later, Eusebius in his Onomasticon (translated by St. Jerome) also refers to the settlement as Nazara. The nașirutha of the scriptures of the Mandeans refers to "priestly craft", not to Nazareth, which they identified with Qom.

The first non-Christian reference to Nazareth is an inscription on a marble fragment from a synagogue found in Caesarea Maritima in 1962. This fragment gives the town's name in Hebrew as נצרת (n-ṣ-r-t). The inscription dates to c. AD 300 and chronicles the assignment of priests that took place at some time after the Bar Kokhba revolt, AD 132–35. (See "Middle Roman to Byzantine Periods" below.) An 8th-century AD Hebrew inscription, which was the earliest known Hebrew reference to Nazareth prior to the discovery of the inscription above, uses the same form.

=== Nazarenes, Nasranis, Notzrim, Christians ===
Around 331, Eusebius records that, from the name Nazareth, Christ was called a Nazoraean, and that, in earlier centuries, Christians were once called Nazarenes. Tertullian (Against Marcion 4:8) records that "for this reason the Jews call us 'Nazarenes'." In the New Testament Christians are called "Christians" three times (in Acts 11:26; 26:28; and 1 Peter 4:16), but never directly by the Apostle Paul. They are called "Nazarenes" once by Tertullus, a lawyer representing Jews. The Rabbinic and modern Hebrew name for Christians, notzrim, is also thought to derive from Nazareth, and be connected with Tertullus' charge against Paul of being a member of the sect of the Nazarenes, Nazoraioi, "men of Nazareth" in Acts. Against this, some medieval Jewish polemical texts connect notzrim with the netsarim "watchmen" of Ephraim in Jeremiah 31:6. In Syriac Aramaic Nasrath (ܢܨܪܬ) is used for Nazareth, while "Nazarenes" (Acts 24:5) and "of Nazareth" are both Nasrani or Nasraya (ܕܢܨܪܝܐ) an adjectival form. Nasrani is used in the Quran for Christians, and in Modern Standard Arabic may refer more widely to Western people. Saint Thomas Christians, an ancient community of Christians in India who trace their origins to evangelistic activity of Thomas the Apostle in the 1st century, are sometimes known by the name "Nasrani" even today.

== History ==
Archaeological evidence shows that Nazareth was occupied during the late Hellenistic period, through the Roman period and into the Byzantine period.

=== Stone and Metal Ages ===
Archaeological researchers have revealed that a funerary and cult center at Kfar HaHoresh, about two miles (3.2 km) from current Nazareth, dates back roughly 9,000 years to the Pre-Pottery Neolithic B era. The remains of some 65 individuals were found, buried under huge horizontal headstone structures, some of which consisted of up to 3 tons of locally produced white plaster. Decorated human skulls uncovered there have led archaeologists to identify Kfar HaHoresh as a major cult centre in that era.

The Franciscan priest Bellarmino Bagatti, "Director of Christian Archaeology", carried out extensive excavation of this "Venerated Area" from 1955 to 1965. Fr. Bagatti uncovered pottery dating from the Middle Bronze Age (2200 to 1500 BC) and ceramics, silos and grinding mills from the Iron Age (1500 to 586 BC) which indicated substantial settlement in the Nazareth basin at that time.

=== Roman Empire ===
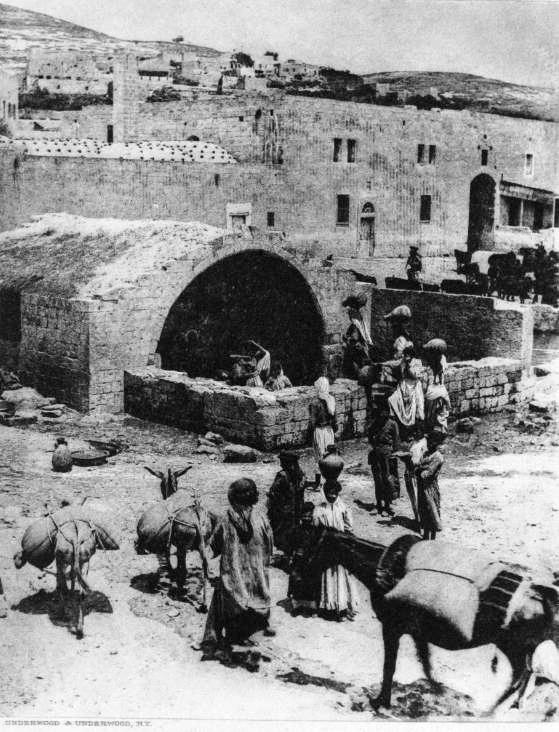
Historic photo of Mary's Well

According to the Gospel of Luke, Nazareth was the home village of Mary as well as the site of the Annunciation (when the angel Gabriel informed Mary that she would give birth to Jesus). According to the Gospel of Matthew, Joseph and Mary resettled in Nazareth after returning from the flight from Bethlehem to Egypt. According to the Bible, Jesus grew up in Nazareth from some point in his childhood. However, some modern scholars also regard Nazareth as the birthplace of the historical Jesus. Craig S. Keener states that it is rarely disputed that Jesus was from Nazareth, an obscure small village not worthy of invention. Gerd Theissen concurs with that conclusion.

A Hebrew inscription found in Caesarea dating to the late 3rd or early 4th century mentions Nazareth as the home of the priestly Hapizzez/Hafizaz family after the Bar Kokhba revolt (AD 132–135). From the three fragments that have been found, the inscription seems to be a list of the twenty-four priestly courses, with each course (or family) assigned its proper order and the name of each town or village in Galilee where it settled. Nazareth is not spelled with the "z" sound but with the Hebrew tsade (thus "Nasareth" or "Natsareth"). Eleazar Kalir (a Hebrew Galilean poet variously dated from the 6th to 10th century) mentions a locality clearly in the Nazareth region bearing the name Nazareth נצרת (in this case vocalized "Nitzrat"), which was home to the descendants of the 18th Kohen family Happitzetz (הפצץ), for at least several centuries after the Bar Kochva revolt.

Although it is mentioned in the New Testament gospels, there are no extant non-biblical references to Nazareth until around AD 200, when Sextus Julius Africanus, cited by Eusebius (Church History 1.7.14), speaks of Nazara as a village in Judea and locates it near Cochaba (modern-day Kaukab). In the same passage Africanus writes of desposunoi – relatives of Jesus – who he claims kept the records of their descent with great care. Ken Dark describes the view that Nazareth did not exist in Jesus's time as "archaeologically unsupportable".

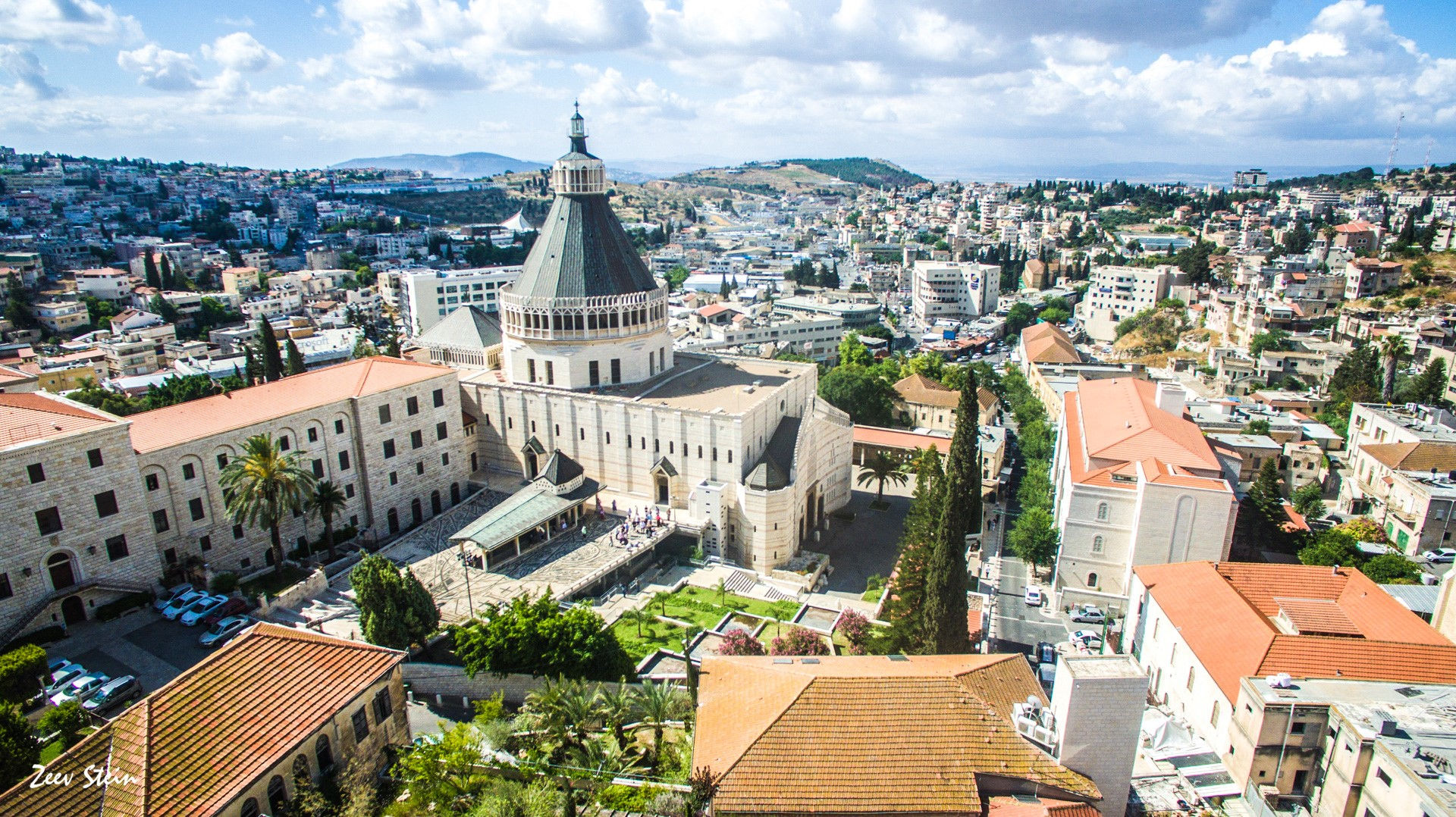
The Basilica of the Annunciation

James F. Strange, Professor of Religious Studies at the University of South Florida, notes: "Nazareth is not mentioned in ancient Jewish sources earlier than the third century AD. This likely reflects its lack of prominence both in Galilee and in Judaea." Strange originally calculated the population of Nazareth at the time of Christ as "roughly 1,600 to 2,000 people" but, in a subsequent publication that followed more than a decade of additional research, revised this figure down to "a maximum of about 480." In 2009, Israeli archaeologist Yardenna Alexandre excavated archaeological remains in Nazareth that date to the time of Jesus in the early Roman period. Alexandre told reporters, "The discovery is of the utmost importance since it reveals for the very first time a house from the Jewish village of Nazareth."

Other sources state that during Jesus' time, Nazareth had a population of 400 and one public bath, which was important for civic and religious purposes, as a mikva.

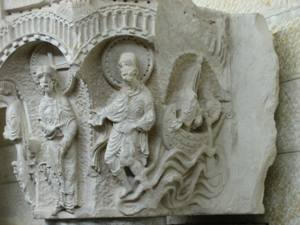
Crusader-era carving in Nazareth

A tablet at the Bibliothèque Nationale in Paris, dating to AD 50, was sent from Nazareth to Paris in 1878. It contains an inscription known as the "Ordinance of Caesar" that outlines the penalty of death for those who violate tombs or graves. However, it is suspected that this inscription came to Nazareth from somewhere else (possibly Sepphoris). Bagatti writes: "we are not certain that it was found in Nazareth, even though it came from Nazareth to Paris. At Nazareth there lived various vendors of antiquities who got ancient material from several places." C. Kopp is more definite: "It must be accepted with certainty that [the Ordinance of Caesar]... was brought to the Nazareth market by outside merchants." Princeton University archaeologist Jack Finnegan describes additional archaeological evidence related to settlement in the Nazareth basin during the Bronze and Iron Ages, and states that "Nazareth was a strongly Jewish settlement in the Roman period."

In 2020, Yardenna Alexandre confirmed that Jews from Judea migrated to Galilee and settled in new villages and settlements, including Nazareth, since the late Hellenistic-Hasmonean period (c. late 2nd century). Under the leadership of priestly families, the Jewish inhabitants observed ritual purity laws. Previously, most of Galilee, except for minor short-lived Israelite settlements in the Naḥal Ẓippori basin, had an occupational gap for about 5 centuries because of the Assyrian conquest in 732 BCE. However, there is strong evidence for Assyrian presence in Galilee, based on artefacts in Cana, which was north of Nazareth. Konrad Schmid and Jens Schroter note that Assyrians were typically relocated to conquered territories, which most likely included Israel.

Some scholars believed Jesus, a native of Nazareth, was influenced by Cynicism, which was popular in Hellenized Galilean cities such as Gadara.

=== Byzantine Empire ===
Epiphanius in his Panarion (c. AD 375) numbers Nazareth among the cities devoid of a non-Jewish population. Epiphanius, writing of Joseph of Tiberias, a wealthy Roman Jew who converted to Christianity in the time of Constantine, says he claimed to have received an imperial rescript to build Christian churches in Jewish towns and villages where no gentiles or Samaritans dwell, naming Tiberias, Diocaesarea, Sepphoris, Nazareth and Capernaum. From this scarce notice, it has been concluded that a small church which encompassed a cave complex might have been located in Nazareth in the early 4th century", although the town was Jewish until the 7th century.

The Christian monk and Bible translator Jerome, writing at the beginning of the 5th century, says Nazareth was a viculus or mere village.

In the 6th century, religious narrations from local Christians about the Virgin Mary began to spark interest in the site among pilgrims, who founded the first church at the location of the current Greek Orthodox Church of the Annunciation at the site of a freshwater spring, today known as Mary's Well. Around 570, the Anonymous of Piacenza reports travelling from Sepphoris to Nazareth. There he records seeing in the Jewish synagogue the books from which Jesus learnt his letters, and a bench where he sat. According to him, Christians could lift it, but Jews could not, since it disallowed them from dragging it outside. Writing of the beauty of the Hebrew women there, he records them saying St. Mary was a relative of theirs, and notes that, "The house of St. Mary is a basilica." Constantine the Great ordered that churches be built in Jewish cities, and Nazareth was one of the places designated for this purpose, although construction of churches apparently only started decades after Constantine's death, i.e. after 352.

Archaeologists have unearthed evidence that previous to the erection of the Byzantine-period church at the site of Mary's house in the mid-5th century, Judeo-Christians had built there a synagogue-church, leaving behind Judeo-Christian symbols. Until being expelled in c. 630, Jews probably kept on using their older synagogue, while the Judeo-Christian needed to build their own, probably at the site of Mary's house.

The Jewish town profited from the Christian pilgrim trade which began in the 4th century AD, but latent anti-Christian hostility broke out in AD 614 when the Persians invaded Palestine. The Christian Byzantine author Eutychius claimed that Jewish people of Nazareth helped the Persians carry out their slaughter of the Christians. When the Byzantine or Eastern Roman emperor Heraclius ejected the Persians in AD 629–630, he expelled the Jews from the village, turning it all-Christian.

=== Middle Ages ===
The Arab Muslim invasion of AD 638 had no immediate impact on the Christians of Nazareth and their churches, since Bishop Arculf remembered seeing there around 670 two churches, one at the house of Joseph where Jesus had lived as a child, and one at the house of Mary where she received the Annunciation – but no synagogue, which had possibly been transformed into a mosque. The 721 iconoclastic edict of Caliph Yazid II apparently led to the destruction of the former church, so that Willibald found during his pilgrimage in 724–26 only one church there, the one dedicated to St. Mary, which Christians had to save through repeated payments from destruction by the "pagan Saracens" (Muslim Arabs). The ruins of St. Joseph's remained untouched for a very long time, while the Church St. Mary is repeatedly mentioned throughout the following centuries, including by an Arab geographer in 943.

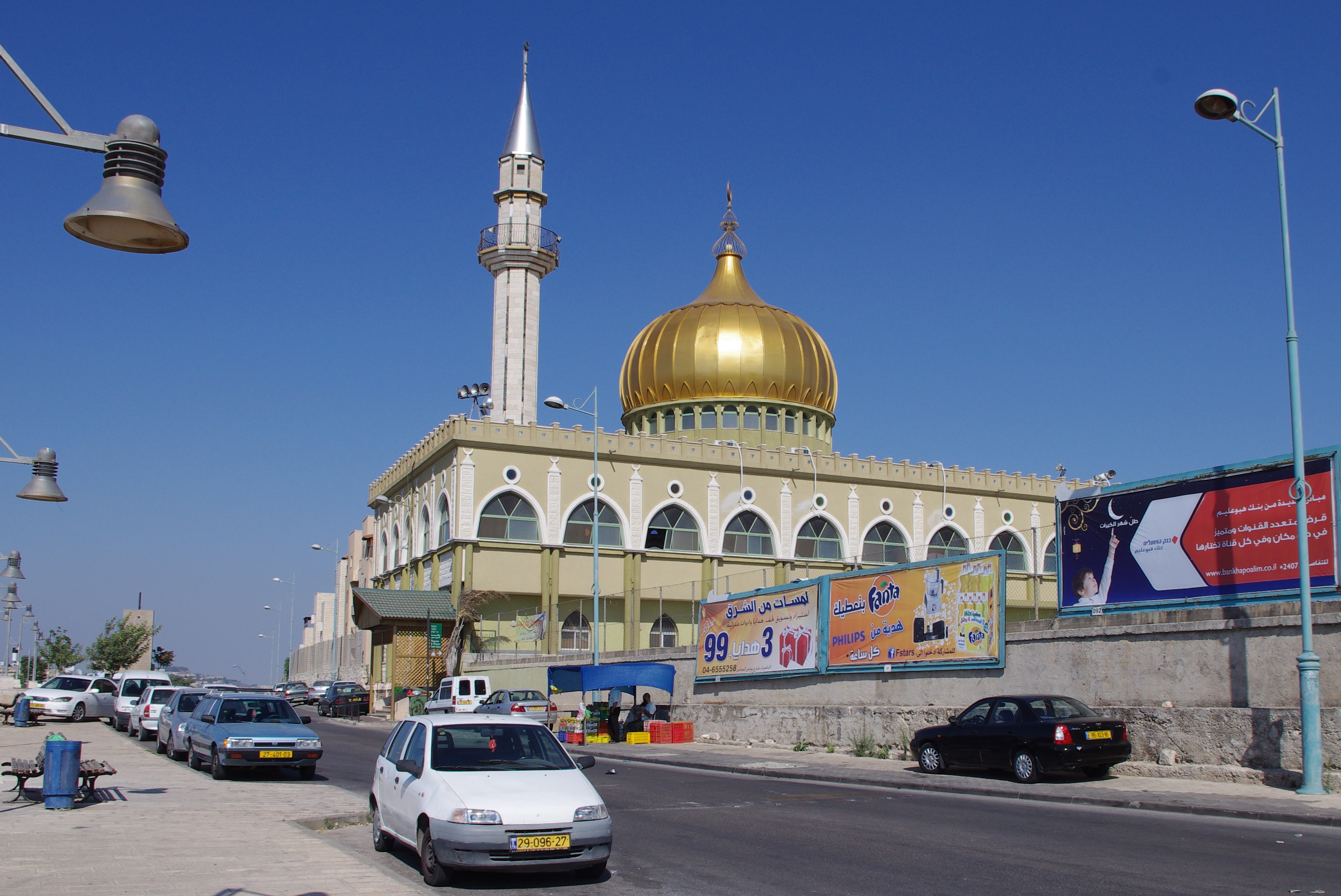
Nabi Saeen Mosque of Nazareth

In 1099, the Crusader Tancred captured Galilee and established his capital in Nazareth. He was the ruler of the Principality of Galilee, which was established, at least in name, in 1099, as a vassal of the Kingdom of Jerusalem. Later, in 1115, Nazareth was created as a seigneury within the principality. A Martin of Nazareth, who probably acted as viscount of Nazareth, is documented in 1115 and in 1130/1131. Nazareth was the original site of the Latin Patriarch, also established by Tancred. The ancient diocese of Scythopolis was relocated under the Archbishop of Nazareth, as one of the four archdioceses in the Kingdom of Jerusalem. When the town returned to Muslim control in 1187 following the victory of Saladin in the Battle of Hattin, the remaining Crusaders and European clergy were forced to leave town. Frederick II managed to negotiate safe passage for pilgrims from Acre in 1229, and in 1251, Louis IX, the king of France, attended mass in the grotto, accompanied by his wife.

In 1263, Baybars, the Mamluk Sultan, destroyed the Christian buildings in Nazareth and declared the site off-limits to Latin clergy, as part of his bid to drive out the remaining Crusaders from Palestine. While Arab Christian families continued to live in Nazareth, its status was reduced to that of a poor village. Pilgrims who visited the site in 1294 reported only a small church protecting the grotto. In the 14th century, Franciscan friars were permitted to return and live within the ruins of the basilica.

=== Ottoman Empire ===
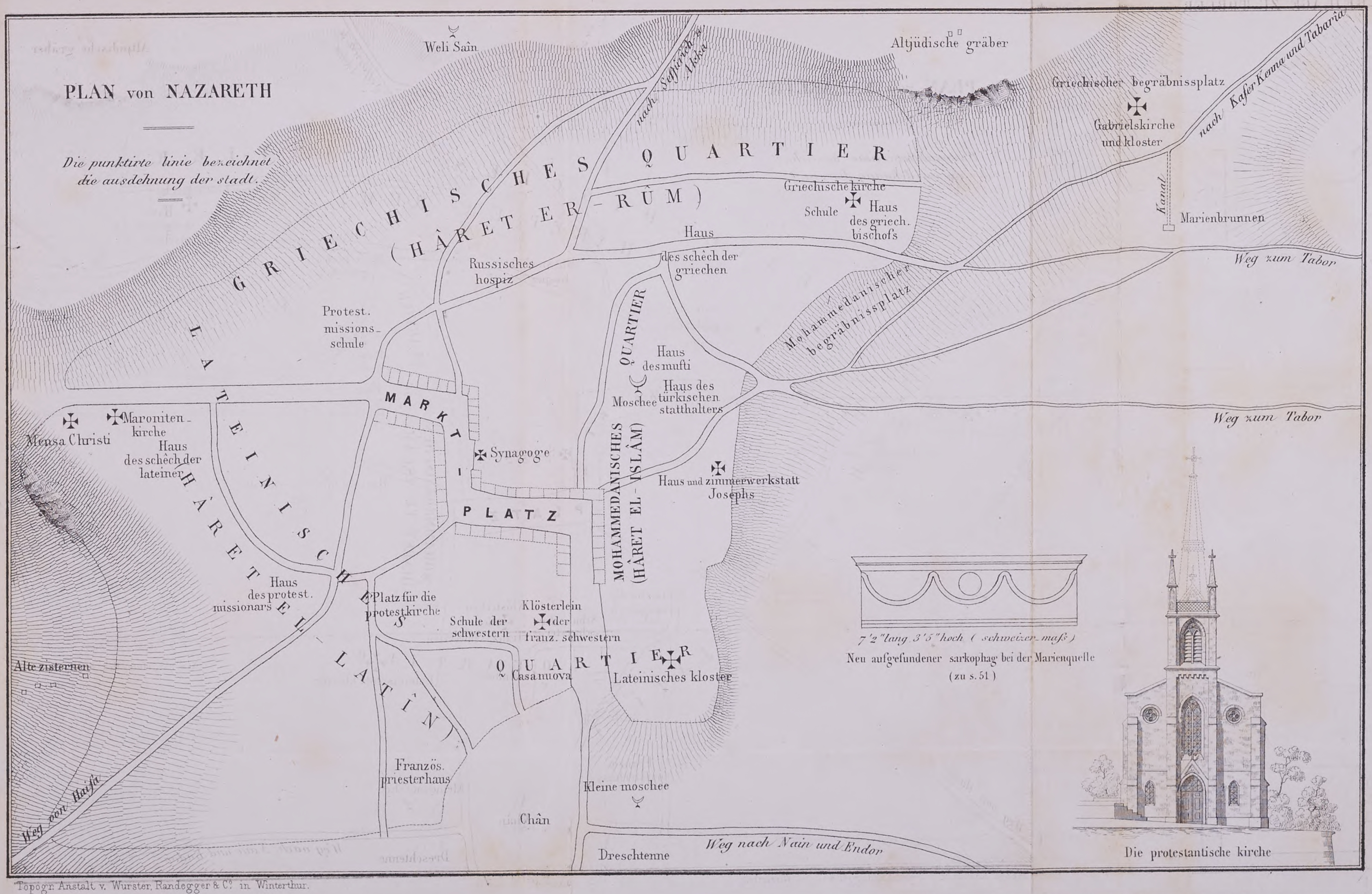
Titus Tobler's 1868 map of Nazareth

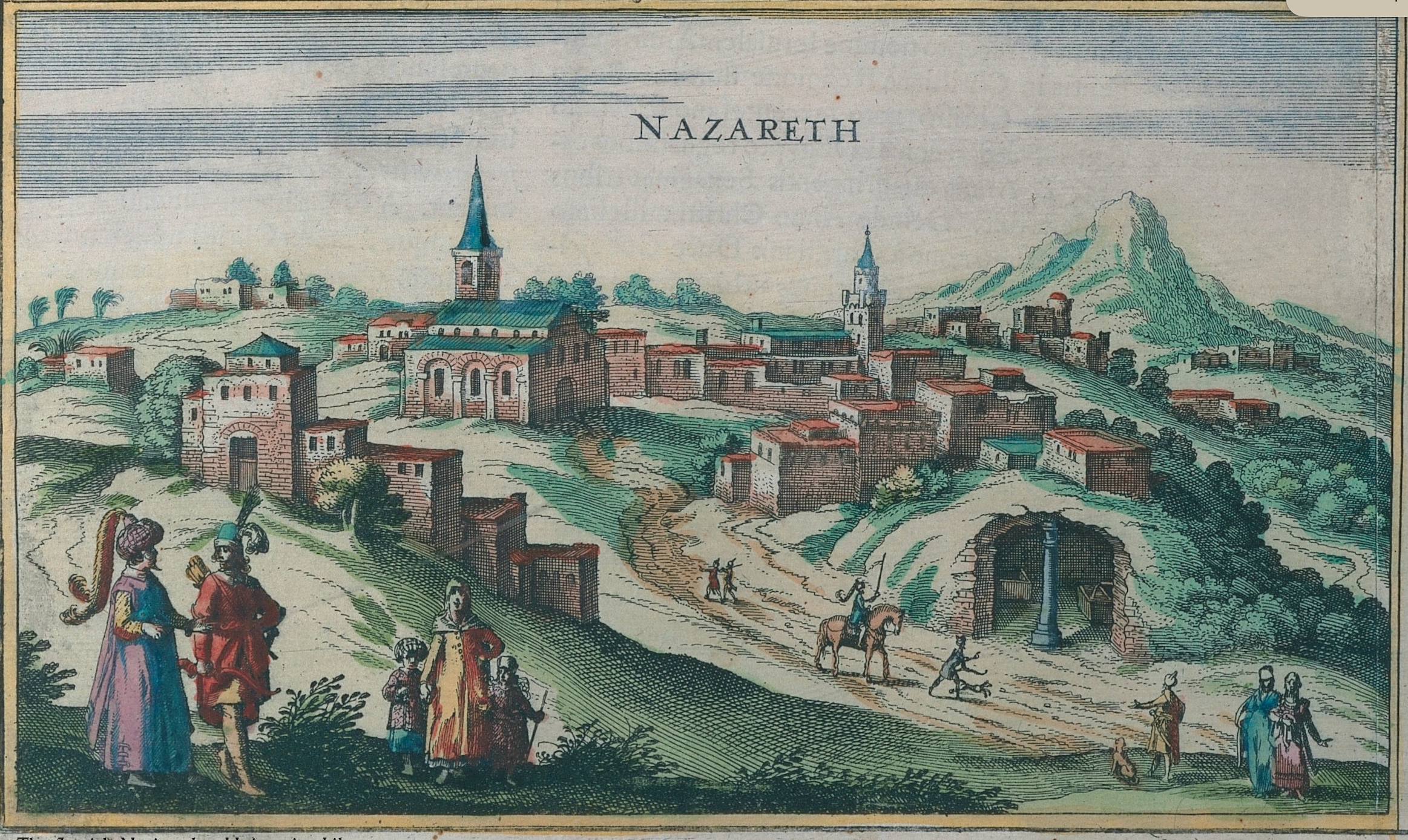
Nazareth, in 1657, by Jan Janssonius

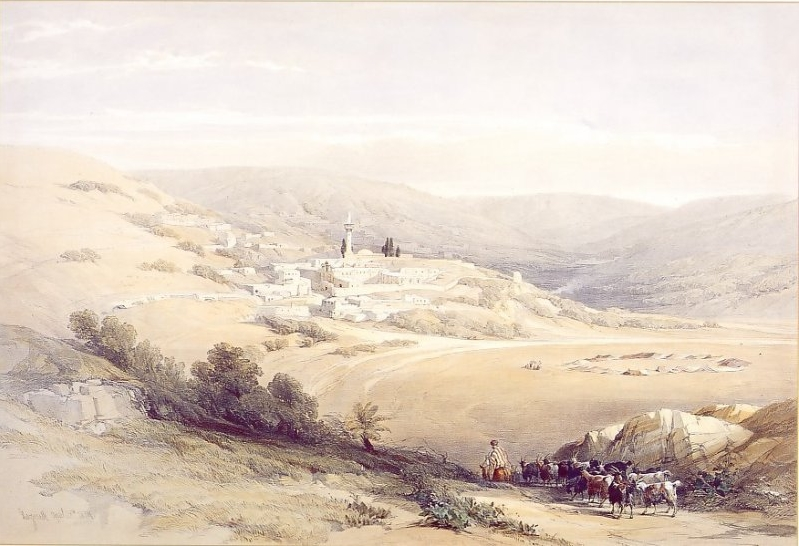
Nazareth, in 1839, published in The Holy Land, Syria, Idumea, Arabia, Egypt, and Nubia

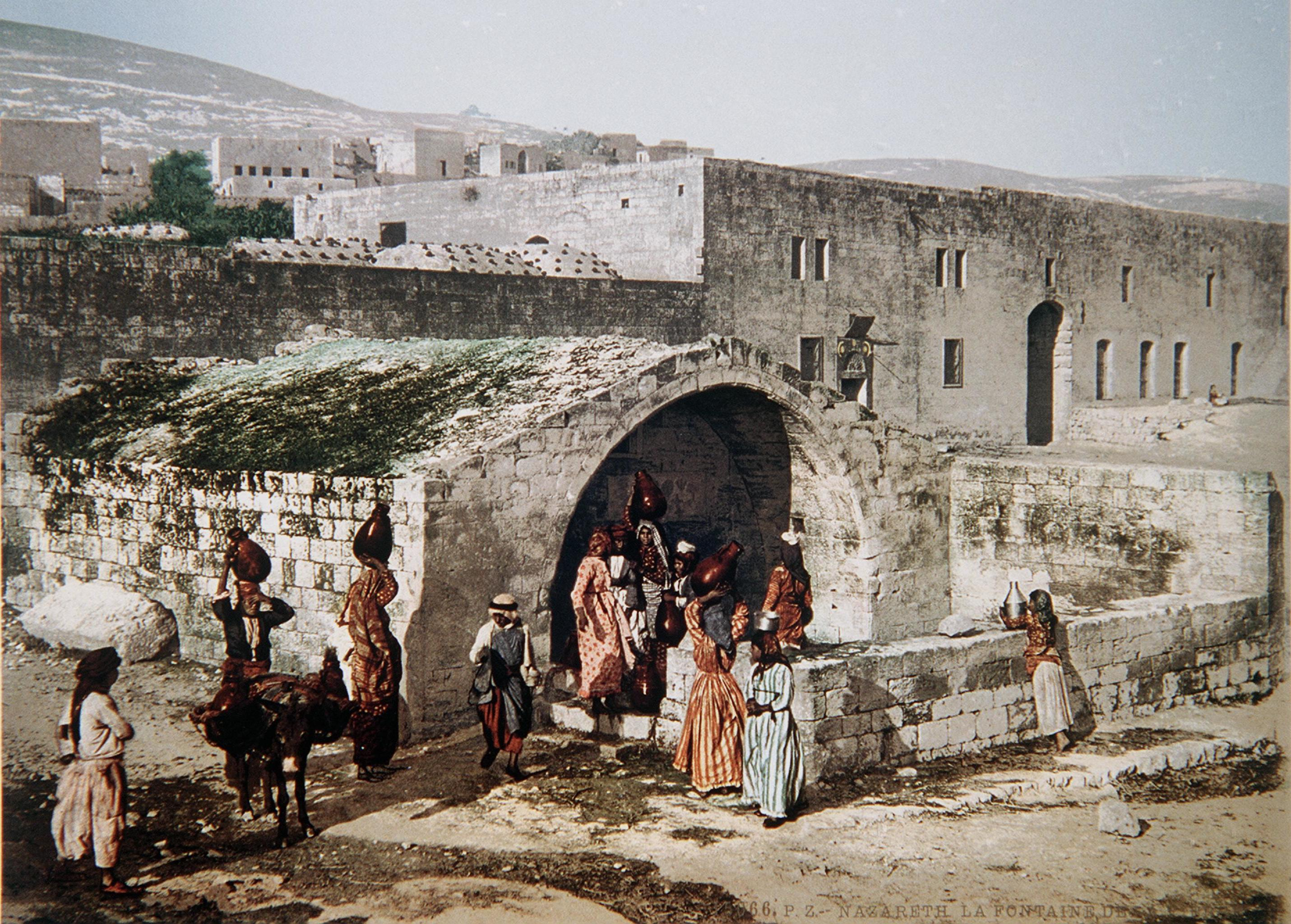
Well of St. Mary, Nazareth, by Felix Bonfils, ca 1880

In 1584 the Franciscan friars were evicted again from the site of the ruined basilica. In 1620, Fakhr-al-Din II, a Druze emir who controlled this part of Ottoman Syria, permitted them to build a small church at the Grotto of the Annunciation. Pilgrimage tours to surrounding sacred sites were organised by the Franciscans, but the monks suffered harassment from surrounding Bedouin tribes who often kidnapped them for ransom.

Stability returned with the rule of Daher al-Umar, a powerful Arab sheikh who ruled the Galilee, and later much of the Levantine coast and Palestine. He transformed Nazareth from a minor village into a large town by encouraging immigration to it. Nazareth played a strategic role in Daher's sheikhdom because it allowed him to wield control over the agricultural areas of central Galilee. He ensured Nazareth's security for other reasons as well, among them strengthening ties with France by protecting the Christian community and protecting one of his wives who resided in Nazareth.

Daher authorized the Franciscans to build a church in 1730. That structure stood until 1955, when it was demolished to make way for a larger building completed in 1967. He also permitted the Franciscans to purchase the Synagogue Church in 1741 and authorized the Greek Orthodox community to build St. Gabriel's Church in 1767. Daher commissioned the construction of a government house known as the Seraya, which served as the city's municipal headquarters until 1991. His descendants — known as the "Dhawahri" — along with the Zu'bi, Fahum, and 'Onallah families later constituted Nazareth's traditional Muslim elite.

Nazareth's Christian community did not fare well under Daher's Ottoman successor, Jazzar Pasha (r. 1776–1804), and friction increased between its Christians and Muslim peasants from the surrounding villages. Nazareth was temporarily captured by the troops of Napoleon Bonaparte in 1799, during his Syrian campaign. Napoleon visited the holy sites and considered appointing his general Jean-Andoche Junot as the duke of Nazareth. During the rule of Governor Ibrahim Pasha of Egypt (1830–1840) over much of Ottoman Syria, Nazareth was opened to European missionaries and traders. After the Ottomans regained control, European money continued to flow into Nazareth and new institutions were established. The Christians of Nazareth were protected during the massacres of 1860 by Aqil Agha, the Bedouin leader who exercised control over the Galilee between 1845 and 1870.

Kaloost Vartan, an Armenian from Istanbul, arrived in 1864 and established the first medical mission in Nazareth, the Scottish "hospital on the hill", or the Nazareth Hospital as it is known today, with sponsorship from the Edinburgh Medical Missionary Society. The Ottoman Sultan, who favored the French, allowed them to establish an orphanage, the Society of Saint Francis de Sale. By the late 19th century, Nazareth was a town with a strong Arab Christian presence and a growing European community, where a number of communal projects were undertaken and new religious buildings were erected. In 1871 Christ Church, the city's only Anglican church, was completed under the leadership of the Rev John Zeller and consecrated by Bishop Samuel Gobat.

In the late 19th century and the first years of the 20th century, Nazareth prospered as it served the role of a market center for the dozens of rural Arab villages located within its vicinity. Local peasants would purchase supplies from Nazareth's many souks (open-air markets), which included separate souks for agricultural produce, metalwork, jewelry and leathers. In 1914, Nazareth consisted of eight quarters: 'Araq, Farah, Jami', Khanuq, Maidan, Mazazwa, Sharqiya and Shufani. There were nine churches, two monasteries, four convents, two mosques, four hospitals, four private schools, a public school, a police station, three orphanages, a hotel, three inns, a flour mill and eight souks. The Ottomans lost control of Palestine, including Nazareth, to the Allied Powers during World War I. The Greek Orthodox Patriarchate invested in properties that further anchored its landholdings in areas of Christian pilgrimage and demographic importance around Nazareth. By then, Nazareth's importance had declined significantly as most of the Arab villages in the Jezreel Valley had been replaced by newly established Jewish communities.

=== British Mandate ===
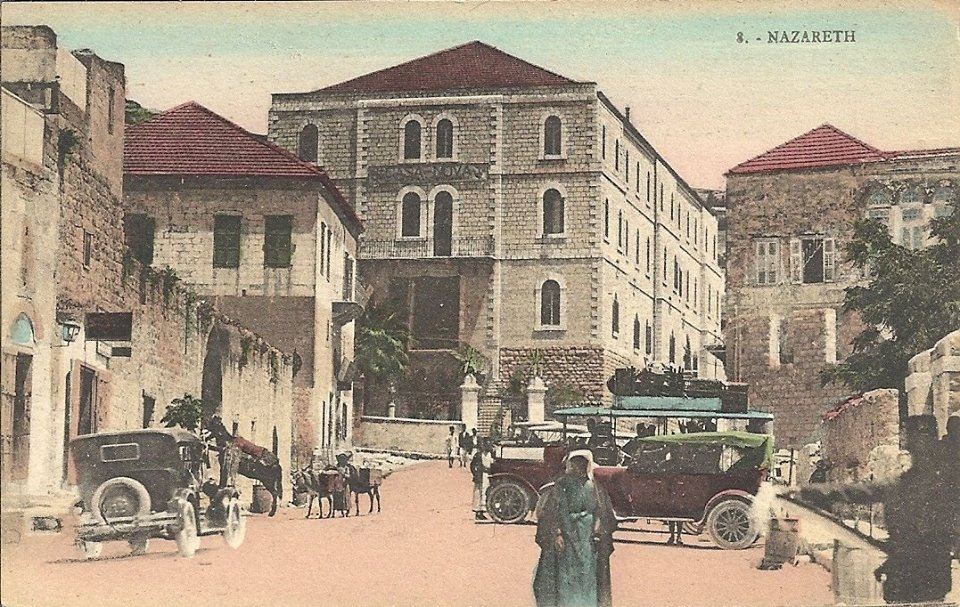
Nazareth, postcard by Karimeh Abbud, ca 1925

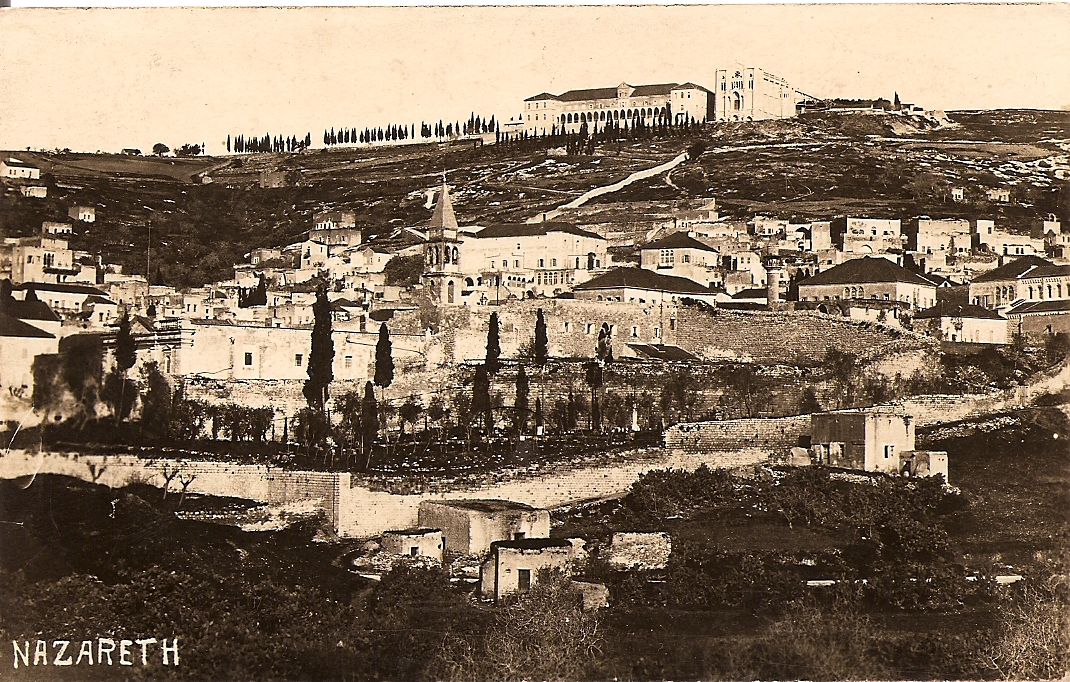
Nazareth, postcard by de:Fadil Saba, ca 1925

Nazareth, 1937

The United Kingdom gained control of Palestine in 1917, the same year of the Balfour Declaration, which promised British support for the establishment of a Jewish homeland in Palestine. In the years preceding and following the declaration, Jewish immigration to Palestine had been increasing. Representatives of Nazareth opposed the Zionist movement, sending a delegation to the 1919 First Palestine Arab Congress and issuing a letter of protest in 1920 that condemned the movement while also proclaiming solidarity with the Jews of Palestine. Politically, Nazareth was becoming further involved in the growing Palestinian nationalist movement. In 1922, a Muslim-Christian Association was established in the town, largely sponsored by the Muslim al-Zu'bi family. A consistent and effective united Palestinian Arab religious front proved difficult to establish and alternative organizations such as the Supreme Muslim Council's Organization of Muslim Youth and the National Muslim Association were established in Nazareth later in the 1920s. In 1922 there were 7,424 people (4,885 Christians, 2,486 Muslims and 53 Jews) living in Nazareth with 16 languages spoken (7,035 Arabic, 135 English, 72 French, 43 Hebrew, 42 German, 20 Armenian, 12 Greek, 12 Italian, five Maltese, five Turkish, four Polish, three Yiddish, two Abyssinian, two Magyar, and two Spanish). Nazareth was relatively slow to modernize. While other towns already had wired electricity, Nazareth delayed its electrification until the 1930s and invested instead in improving its water supply system. This included adding two reservoirs at the northwestern hills and several new cisterns. By 1930, a church for the Baptist denomination, a municipal garden at Mary's Well and a police station based in Daher al-Umar's Seraya had been established and the Muslim Sharqiya Quarter had expanded. In 1935 the Nazareth German war cemetery, built for German soldiers who died in the First World War, was dedicated beside the Holy Family Hospital.

In the 1931 census, Nazareth is listed with a population of 8,756 (5,445 Christians, 3,226 Muslims, 79 Jews, five Baha'i, and one Druze) in 1,834 occupied houses with 138 (119 Muslims and 19 Christians) in nearby suburbs in 28 occupied houses.

In the 1936–1939 Arab Revolt, Nazareth played a minor role, contributing two rebel commanders out of 281 rebel commanders active in the country. The two were Nazareth native and Christian Fu'ad Nassar and Nazareth resident and Indur native Tawfiq al-Ibrahim. The nearby villages of Saffuriya and al-Mujaydil played a more active military role, contributing nine commanders between them. The leaders of the revolt sought to use Nazareth as a staging ground to protest the British proposal to include the Galilee into a future Jewish state. On 26 September 1937, the British district commissioner of the Galilee, Lewis Yelland Andrews, was assassinated in Nazareth by local rebels.

In the 1938 village statistics, Nazareth is listed with a population of 9,900 (including 100 Jews) with 161 in nearby suburbs. In the 1945 village statistics, Nazareth is listed with a population of 14,200 (8,600 Christians and 5,600 Muslims).

By 1946, the municipal boundary of Nazareth had been enlarged and new neighborhoods, namely Maidan, Maslakh, Khanuq and Nimsawi, were established. New homes were established in existing quarters and the town still had an abundance of orchards and agricultural fields. Two cigarette factories, a tobacco store, two cinemas and a tile factory had been established, significantly boosting Nazareth's economy. A new police station was built on Nazareth's southernmost hill, while the police station in the Seray had been converted into Nazareth's municipal headquarters. Watchtowers were also erected on some of the hilltops around the town. Other new or expanded government offices included a headquarters for the district commissioner at the former Ottoman military barracks, and offices for the Department of Agriculture and the Department of Survey and Settlement.

Nazareth was in the territory allotted to the Arab state under the 1947 UN Partition Plan. In the months leading up to the 1948 Arab–Israeli War, the town became a refuge for Arab-Palestinians fleeing the urban centers of Tiberias, Haifa and Baysan before and during the Haganah's capture of those cities on 18 April 22 April and 12 May 1948, respectively.

=== Israel ===
==== 1948 War ====
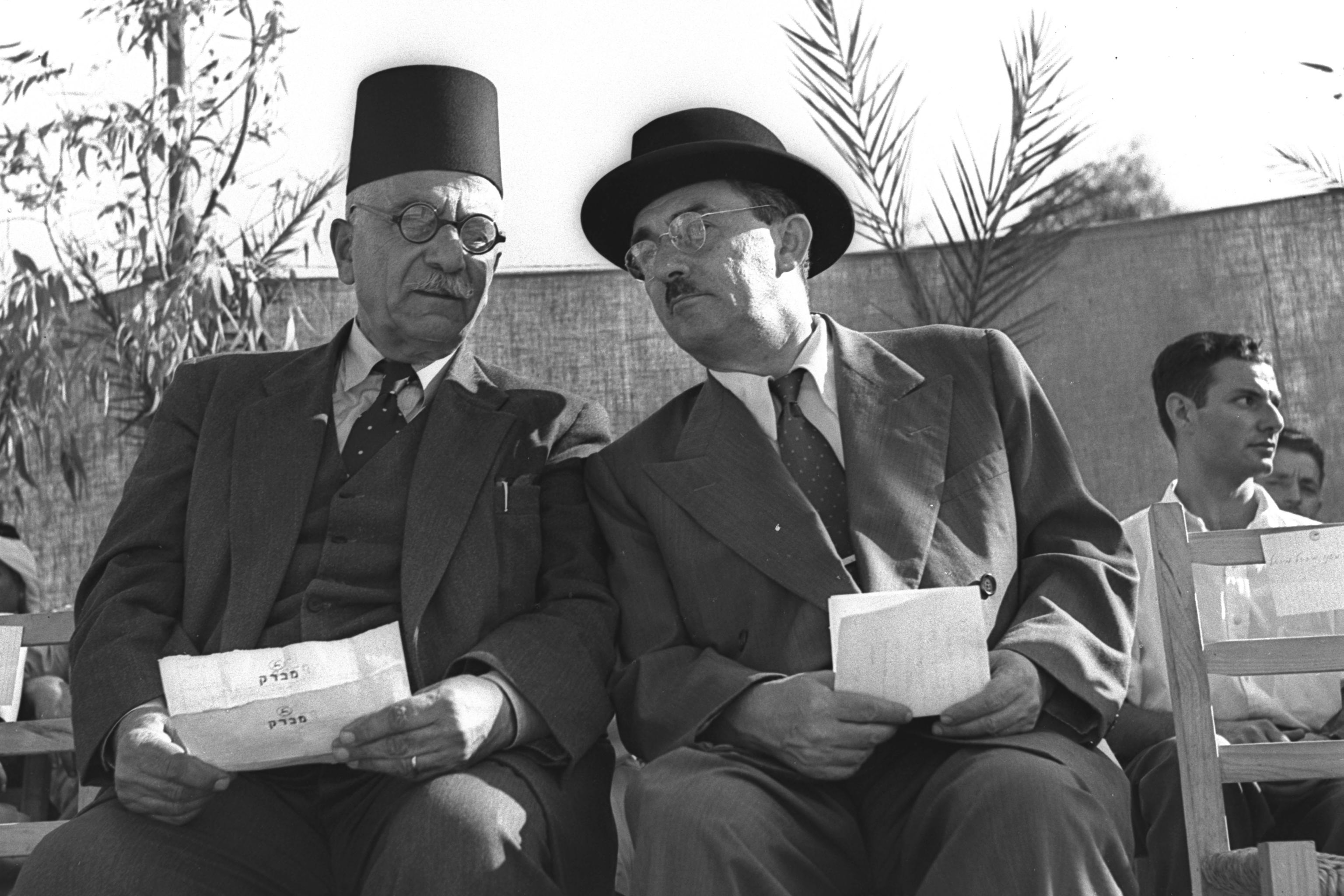
Amin-Salim Jarjora (left), Mayor of Nazareth, with Israeli prime minister Moshe Sharett, 1955

Nazareth itself was not a field of battle during the 1948 War, which began on 15 May, before the first truce on 11 June, although some of the villagers had joined the loosely organized peasant military and paramilitary forces, and troops from the Arab Liberation Army (ALA) had entered Nazareth on 9 July. The local defense of the town consisted of 200–300 militiamen distributed along the hills surrounding the town. The defense in the southern and western hills collapsed after Israeli shelling, while resistance in the northern hills had to contend with an incoming Israeli armored unit. Not long after the Israelis began shelling the local militiamen, Nazareth's police chief raised a white flag over the town's police station.

Most of the fighting around Nazareth occurred in its satellite villages, particularly in Saffuriya, whose residents put up resistance until largely dispersing following Israeli air raids on 15 July. During the ten days of fighting which occurred between the first and second truce, Nazareth capitulated to Israeli troops during Operation Dekel on 16 July, after little more than token resistance. By then, morale among local militiamen was low and most refused to fight alongside the ALA because of their perceived weakness in the face of Israel's perceived military superiority and the alleged maltreatment of Christian residents and clergy by ALA volunteers. Seeking to prevent the town's destruction, the Muslim mayor of Nazareth, Yusef Fahum requested a halt to all resistance put up by Nazarenes.

The surrender of Nazareth was formalized in a written agreement, whereby the town's leaders agreed to cease hostilities in return for promises from the Israeli officers, including brigade commander Ben Dunkelman (the leader of the operation), that no harm would come to the civilians of the town. Soon after the signing of the agreement, Dunkelman received an order from the Israeli General Chaim Laskov to forcibly evacuate the city's Arabs. He refused, remarking that he was 'shocked and horrified' that he would be commanded to renege on the agreement he, and also Chaim Laskov, had just signed. Twelve hours after defying his superior, he was relieved of his post, but not before obtaining assurances that the security of Nazareth's population would be guaranteed. David Ben-Gurion backed Dunkelman's judgement, fearing that expelling Christian Arabs might provoke an outcry throughout the Christian world. By the end of the war, Nazareth's population saw a large influx of refugees from major urban centers and rural villages in the Galilee.

==== 1950s–1970s ====
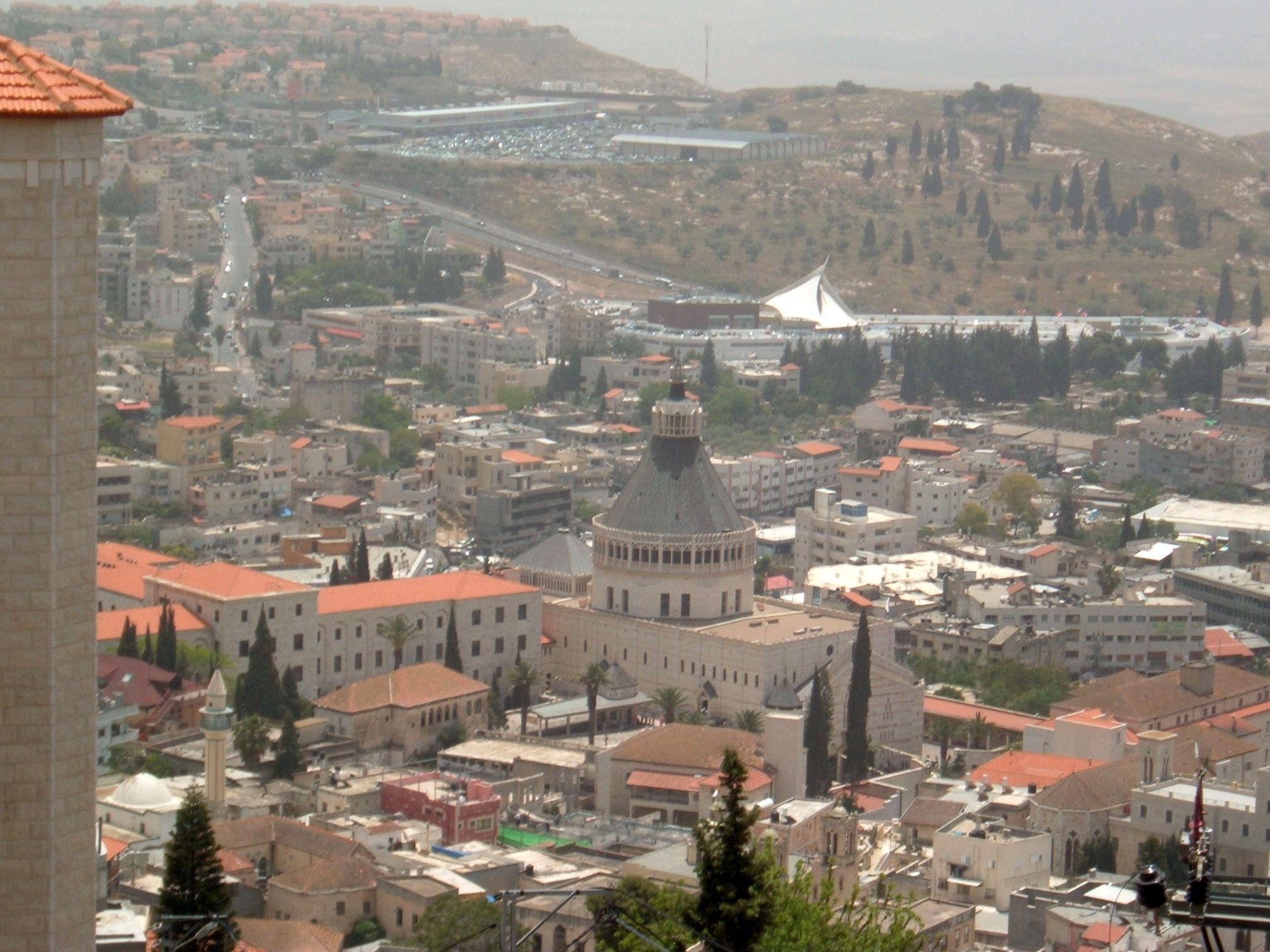
View of modern Nazareth

In the first few years of its incorporation into Israel, Nazareth's affairs were dominated by the issues of land expropriation, internally displaced refugees and the hardships of martial law, which included curfews and travel restrictions. Efforts to resolve these issues were largely unsuccessful and led to frustration among the inhabitants, which in turn contributed to political agitation in the city. As the largest Arab town in Israel, Nazareth became a center of Arab and Palestinian nationalism, and because the Communist Party was the sole legal political group that took up many of the local Arab causes, it gained popularity in Nazareth. Arab political organization within Nazareth and Israel was largely stymied by the state until recent decades. Arab and Palestinian nationalist sentiment continue to influence Nazareth's political life.

In 1954, 1,200 dunams of Nazareth's land, which had been slated for future urban expansion by the municipality, was expropriated by state authorities for the construction of government offices and, in 1957, for the construction of the Jewish town of Nazareth Illit. The latter was built as a way for the state to counterbalance the Arab majority in the region. Knesset member Seif el-Din el-Zoubi, who represented Nazareth, actively opposed the Absentees' Property Law, which allowed state expropriation of land from Arab citizens who were not permitted to return to their original villages. Zoubi argued that the internally displaced refugees were not absentees as they were still living in the country as citizens and wanted to return to their homes. Israel offered compensation to these internal refugees, but most refused for fear of permanently relinquishing their right of return. Tensions between Nazareth's inhabitants and the state came to a head during a 1958 May Day rally where marchers demanded that refugees be allowed to return to their villages, an end to land expropriation, and self-determination for Palestinians. Several young protesters were arrested for throwing stones at security forces.

On 5 January 1964, Pope Paul VI included Nazareth in the first ever papal visit to the Holy Land. Martial law ended in 1966.

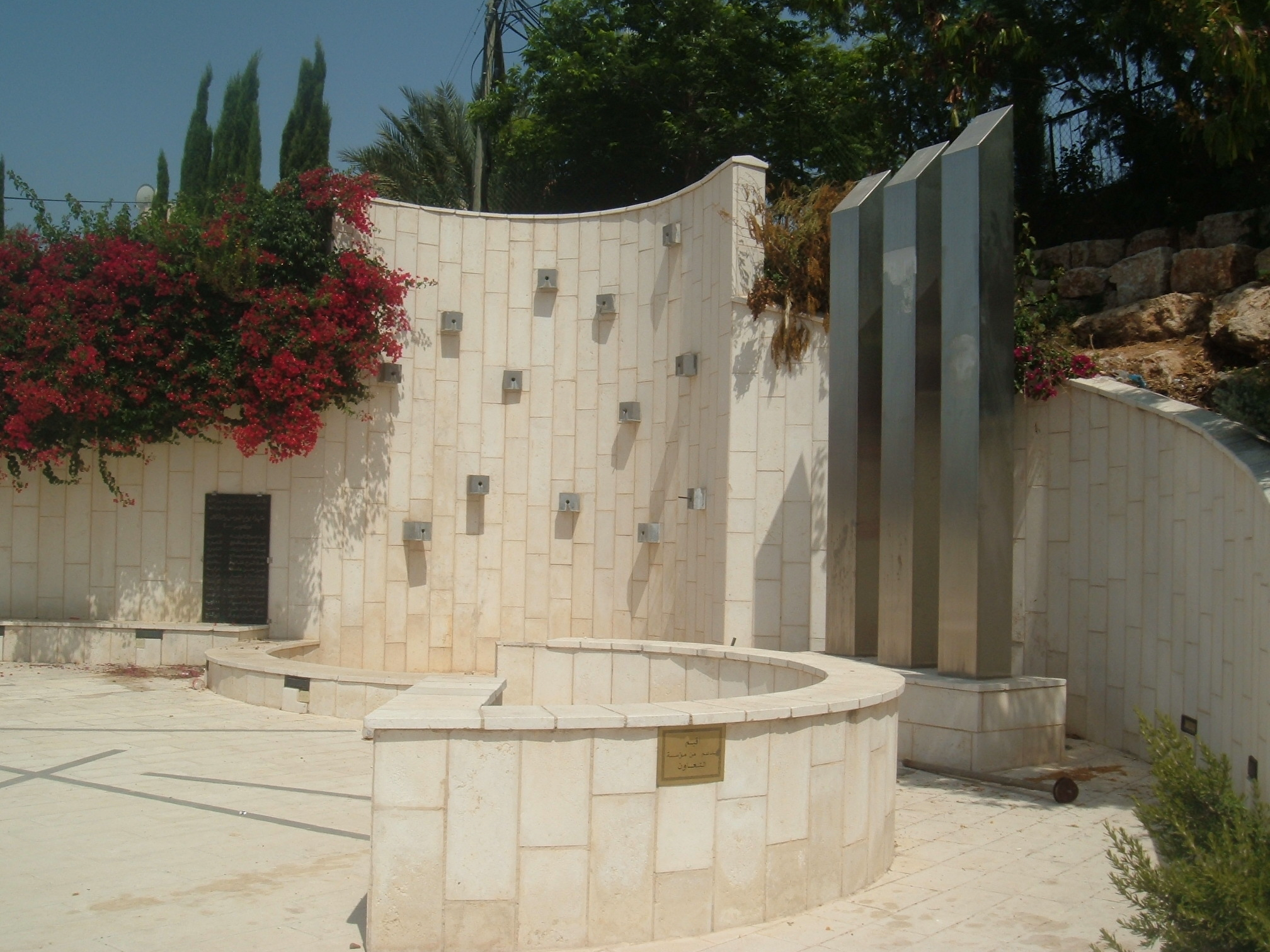
Monument to Arab Israeli casualties in the October 2000 events, Nazareth

As the political center of Israel's Arab citizens, Nazareth is the scene of annual rallies held by the community including Land Day since March 1975 and May Day. There are also frequent demonstrations in support of the Palestinian cause.

==== 1980s–1990s ====
In the 1980s, the government began attempts to merge the nearby village of Ilut with Nazareth, although this move was opposed by residents from both localities and the Nazareth Municipality. Ilut's residents were included as part of Nazareth's electorate in the 1983 and 1989 municipal elections, which Ilut's residents largely boycotted, and in the 1988 national elections. Ilut was designated by the Interior Ministry as a separate local council in 1991. The Israeli government has designated a Nazareth metropolitan area that includes the local councils of Yafa an-Naseriyye to the south, Reineh, Mashhad and Kafr Kanna to the north, Iksal and Nazareth Illit to the east and Migdal HaEmek to the west.

During the First Intifada (1987–1993), May Day marchers vocally supported the Palestinian uprising. On 22 December 1987, riots broke out during a strike held in solidarity with the Intifada. On 24 January 1988, a mass demonstration attracted between 20,000 and 50,000 participants from Nazareth and other Arab towns. On 13 May, during a football match in Nahariya, a riot broke out between Arab and Jewish fans, resulting in a Jewish man being stabbed and 54 people, mostly Arabs, being arrested. A rally in Nazareth on 19 May followed, in which thousands of Arabs protested against "racist attacks" against the Arab fans and discriminatory policies against Arabs in general.

As of the early 1990s, no city plans drafted by Nazareth Municipality have been approved by the government (both the British Mandate and later Israel) since 1942. This has left many people in Nazareth who vote in the city's municipal elections and receive services from its municipality effectively outside of the city's jurisdiction. Such areas include the Sharqiya and Jabal el-Daula quarters which are in Nazareth Illit's jurisdiction and whose residents had to acquire building permits from the latter city. Similarly, the Bilal neighborhood of the Safafra Quarter is located within Reineh's jurisdiction. In 1993, the residents of Bilal became official residents of Reineh. Nazareth's municipal plans for expansion prior to the establishment of Nazareth Illit, were to the north and east, areas that the latter city now occupy. Arab satellite towns are closely located to the north, west and southwest. Thus, the remaining area within the city's municipal boundaries available for expansion were to the northwest and the south, where the topography restricted urban development. After lobbying the Knesset and the Interior Ministry, el-Zoubi was able to have areas to the northwest of the city annexed to the municipality.

==== 2000s–2020s ====
Preparations for the Pope's visit to Nazareth in 2000 triggered highly publicized tensions related to the Basilica of the Annunciation. In 1997, permission was granted to construct a paved plaza to handle the thousands of Christian pilgrims expected to arrive. A small group of Muslims protested and occupied the site, where a nephew of Saladin, named Shihab al-Din, is believed to be buried. A school, al-Harbyeh, had been built on the site by the Ottomans, and the Shihab-Eddin shrine, along with several shops owned by the waqf, were located there. Government approval of plans for a large mosque on the property triggered protests from Christian leaders. In 2002, a special government commission permanently halted construction of the mosque.

In March 2006, public protests followed the disruption of a prayer service by an Israeli Jew and his Christian wife and daughter, who detonated firecrackers inside the church. The family said it wanted to draw attention to their problems with the welfare authorities. In July 2006 a rocket fired by Hezbollah as part of the 2006 Israel-Lebanon conflict killed two children in Nazareth.

In March 2010, the Israeli government approved a $3 million plan to develop Nazareth's tourism industry. New businesses receive start-up grants of up to 30 percent of their initial investment from the Ministry of Tourism.

Riots broke out in Nazareth during the 2021 Israel–Palestine crisis. In September 2024, a rocket launched by Hezbollah struck the city, and fires broke elsewhere in the city.

== Geography ==
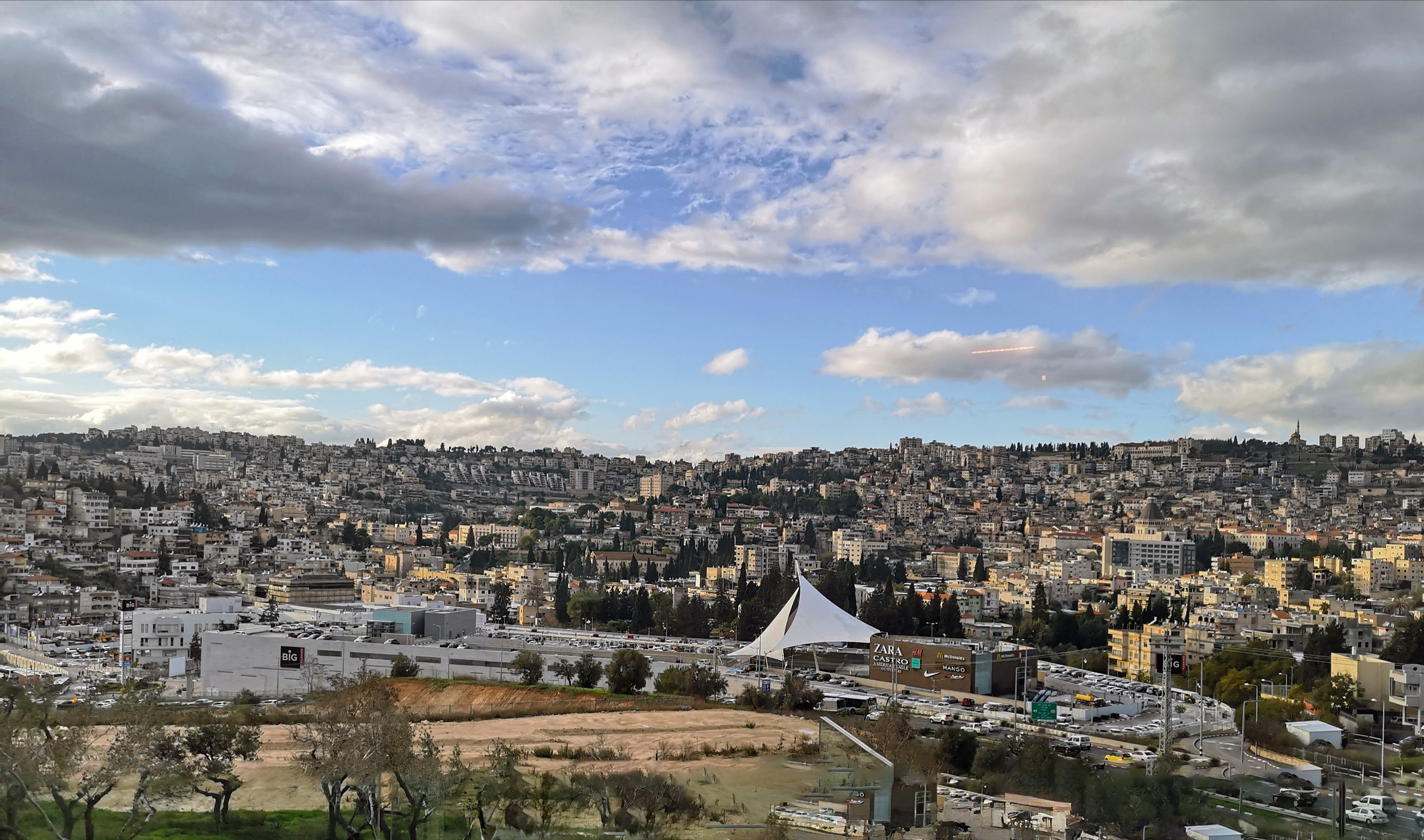
Nazareth cityscape

Two locations for Nazareth are cited in ancient texts: the Galilean (northern) location in the Christian gospels and a southern (Judean) location mentioned in several early noncanonical texts.

Modern-day Nazareth is nestled in a natural bowl which reaches from 320 metres above sea level to the crest of the hills about 488 metres. Nazareth is about 25 kilometres from the Sea of Galilee and about 9 kilometres west from Mount Tabor. The major cities of Jerusalem and Tel Aviv are situated approximately 146 kilometres and 108 kilometres respectively, away from Nazareth. The Nazareth Range, in which the town lies, is the southernmost of several parallel east–west hill ranges that characterize the elevated tableau of Lower Galilee.

=== Climate ===
Nazareth has a hot-summer Mediterranean climate (Köppen climate classification: Csa).

Climate data for Nazareth, Israel
Month	Jan	Feb	Mar	Apr	May	Jun	Jul	Aug	Sep	Oct	Nov	Dec	Year
Record high °C (°F)	22 (72)	28 (82)	31 (88)	37 (99)	42 (108)	40 (104)	40 (104)	42 (108)	41 (106)	38 (100)	32 (90)	30 (86)	42 (108)
Mean daily maximum °C (°F)	15.2 (59.4)	16.0 (60.8)	18.3 (64.9)	22.7 (72.9)	27.9 (82.2)	30.1 (86.2)	31.2 (88.2)	31.6 (88.9)	30.0 (86.0)	28.1 (82.6)	23.5 (74.3)	17.5 (63.5)	24.3 (75.8)
Daily mean °C (°F)	11.2 (52.2)	12.0 (53.6)	13.6 (56.5)	17.1 (62.8)	21.8 (71.2)	24.4 (75.9)	26.0 (78.8)	26.6 (79.9)	25.0 (77.0)	22.8 (73.0)	18.7 (65.7)	13.7 (56.7)	19.4 (66.9)
Mean daily minimum °C (°F)	7.1 (44.8)	7.9 (46.2)	8.9 (48.0)	11.5 (52.7)	15.7 (60.3)	18.7 (65.7)	20.8 (69.4)	21.5 (70.7)	19.9 (67.8)	17.5 (63.5)	13.8 (56.8)	9.8 (49.6)	14.4 (58.0)
Record low °C (°F)	−2.4 (27.7)	−3.9 (25.0)	−1 (30)	2 (36)	6 (43)	8 (46)	17 (63)	17 (63)	12 (54)	7 (45)	1 (34)	−1.4 (29.5)	−3.9 (25.0)
Average precipitation mm (inches)	156 (6.1)	111 (4.4)	72 (2.8)	23 (0.9)	7 (0.3)	0 (0)	0 (0)	0 (0)	1 (0.0)	15 (0.6)	72 (2.8)	123 (4.8)	580 (22.7)
Average precipitation days	16	14	11	6	3	1	0	1	1	6	9	15	83
Average relative humidity (%)	68	63	61	53	50	50	52	55	56	59	59	70	58
Mean daily sunshine hours	6	6	7	8	11	12	12	11	10	9	7	6	9
Percentage possible sunshine	54	57	59	65	76	85	86	85	81	75	68	55	71
Source 1:
Source 2: (sunshine percentages)

== Demographics ==
Historical population
Year	Pop.	±%
1972	33,000	—
1983	45,300	+37.3%
1995	52,200	+15.2%
2008	71,700	+37.4%
2022	77,295	+7.8%
2024	75,704	−2.1%

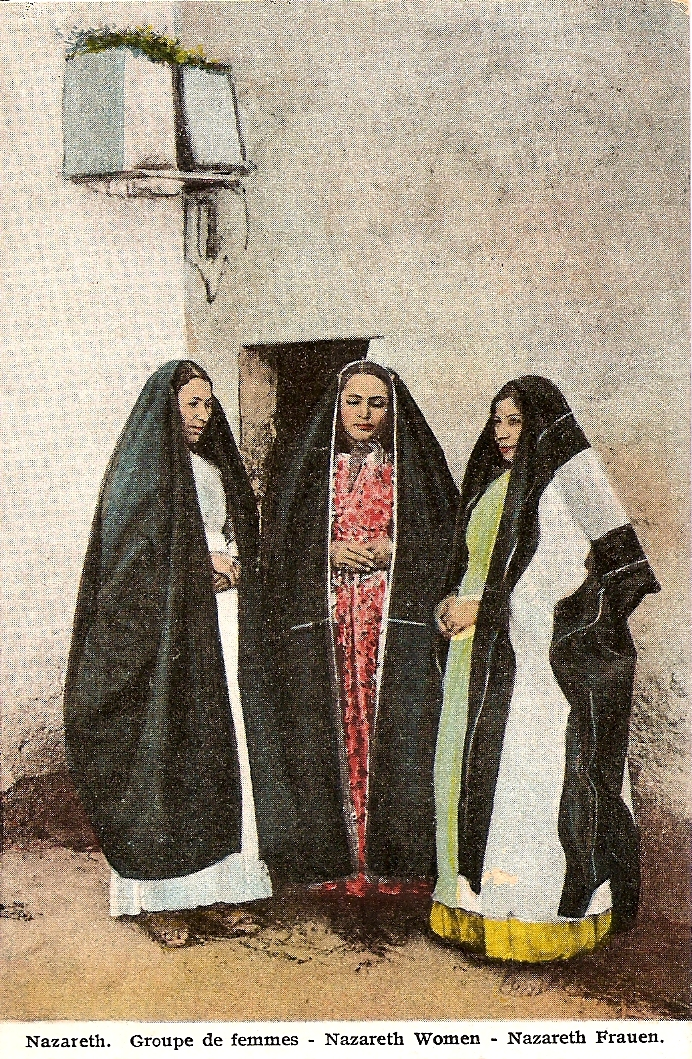
Old postcard of Nazareth women based on photo by Félix Bonfils

Nazareth is the second largest Arab city in Israel. In 2009, the Israel Central Bureau of Statistics reported that Nazareth's Arab population was 69% Muslim and 31% Christian. The greater Nazareth metropolitan area had a population of 210,000, including 125,000 Arabs (59%) and 85,000 Jews (41%). It is the only urban area with over 50,000 residents in Israel where the majority of the population is Arab. The greater Nazareth metropolitan area includes Nof HaGalil, Yafa an-Naseriyye, Reineh, Migdal HaEmek, Ein Mahil, Ilut, Kafr Kanna, Mashhad and Iksal.

Nazareth is home to the largest Arab Christian community in Israel. The Christian communities of Nazareth are varied and includes various denominations, the most prominent among them the Greek Orthodox, Melkite Greek Catholic, Latin Catholics, Maronites, Armenian Orthodox, and Protestants. By far the largest among them is the Greek-Orthodox community, headed by a Patriarch based in Jerusalem, and represented in Nazareth by a Metropolite. The Christian communities in Nazareth tend to be wealthier and better educated compared to other Arabs elsewhere in Israel, and Christians of Nazareth occupy the majority of the top positions in the town: three hospitals and bank managers, judges and school principals and faculties. The socio-economic gap between the Christians wealth and Muslim poverty led sometimes to sectarian crises.

Many of the descendants of the Zayadina clan in modern-day Israel use the surname 'al-Zawahirah' or 'Dhawahri' in honor of Daher (whose name is colloquially transliterated as 'Dhaher'). They mostly live in the Galilee localities of Nazareth, Bi'ina, Kafr Manda, and, before its depopulation in the 1948 Arab-Israeli war, the village of Damun. Dhawahri, made up one of the important families in Muslim community of Nazareth, beside the Fahoums, the Zu'bis, and the Onallas.

=== Demographic history ===
During the late Ottoman era, the religious majority of the city fluctuated. In 1838, there were 325 Christian families (half of whom were Greek Orthodox, the remainder belonged to various Catholic churches) and 120 Muslim families. In 1856, the population was estimated to be 4,350, of which Muslims comprised 52%, while Christians from various denominations comprised 48%. In 1862, the population estimate was lower (3,120) and Christians formed a substantial majority of over 78%. The population grew to 5,660 in 1867 and Christians constituted roughly two-thirds and Muslims one-third of the inhabitants. These estimates during the late Ottoman era likely represented crude figures.

A population list from about 1887 showed that Nazareth had about 6,575 inhabitants; 1,620 Muslims, 2,485 Greek Catholics, 845 Catholics, 1,115 Latins, 220 Maronites and 290 Protestants.

For much of the British Mandatory period (1922–1948), Nazareth had a Christian majority (mostly Orthodox Christians) and a Muslim minority.

In 1918, Nazareth had an estimated population of 8,000, two-thirds Christian. In the 1922 British census, Nazareth's population was recorded as 7,424 residents, of which 66% were Christian, 33% were Muslim and roughly 1% were Jewish. In the 1931 census, the population grew to 8,756 and the ratio of Muslims increased to 37%. The largest Christian community were the Greek Orthodox denomination, followed by the Roman Catholics and the Melkites. Smaller communities of Anglicans, Maronites, Syriac Catholics, Protestants and Copts also existed.

In 1946, Nazareth had a population of 15,540, of whom roughly 60% were Christians and 40% were Muslims. The 1948 War led to an exodus of Palestinians and many expelled or fleeing Muslims from villages in the Galilee and the Haifa area found refuge in Nazareth. At one point, some 20,000 mostly Muslim internally displaced persons were present in the city. Following the war's conclusion, the internally displaced persons of Shefa-'Amr, Dabburiya, Ilut and Kafr Kanna returned to their homes. However, those Muslim and Christian internally displaced persons from the nearby destroyed villages of Ma'lul, al-Mujaydil, Saffuriya, the Haifa-area village of Balad al-Sheikh and the major cities of Acre, Haifa, Tiberias, Safad and Baysan remained as they were not able to return to their hometowns. During the war and in the following months, internally displaced persons from Saffuriya established the Safafra Quarter, named after their former village. Around 20% of Nazareth's native inhabitants left Palestine during the war. In an Israeli army census in July 1948, Nazareth had a total population of 17,118, which consisted of 12,640 Nazarenes and 4,478 internally displaced persons. In 1951, the population was recorded as 20,300, 25% of whom were internally displaced persons. The internally displaced persons came from over two dozen villages, but most were from al-Mujaydil, Saffuriya, Tiberias, Haifa, Ma'lul and Indur.

Today, Nazareth still has a significant Christian population, made up of various denominations. The Muslim population has grown due to a number of historical factors that include the city having served as administrative center under British rule, and the influx of internally displaced Palestinian Arabs absorbed into the city from neighboring towns during the 1948 Arab-Israeli war.

== Economy ==
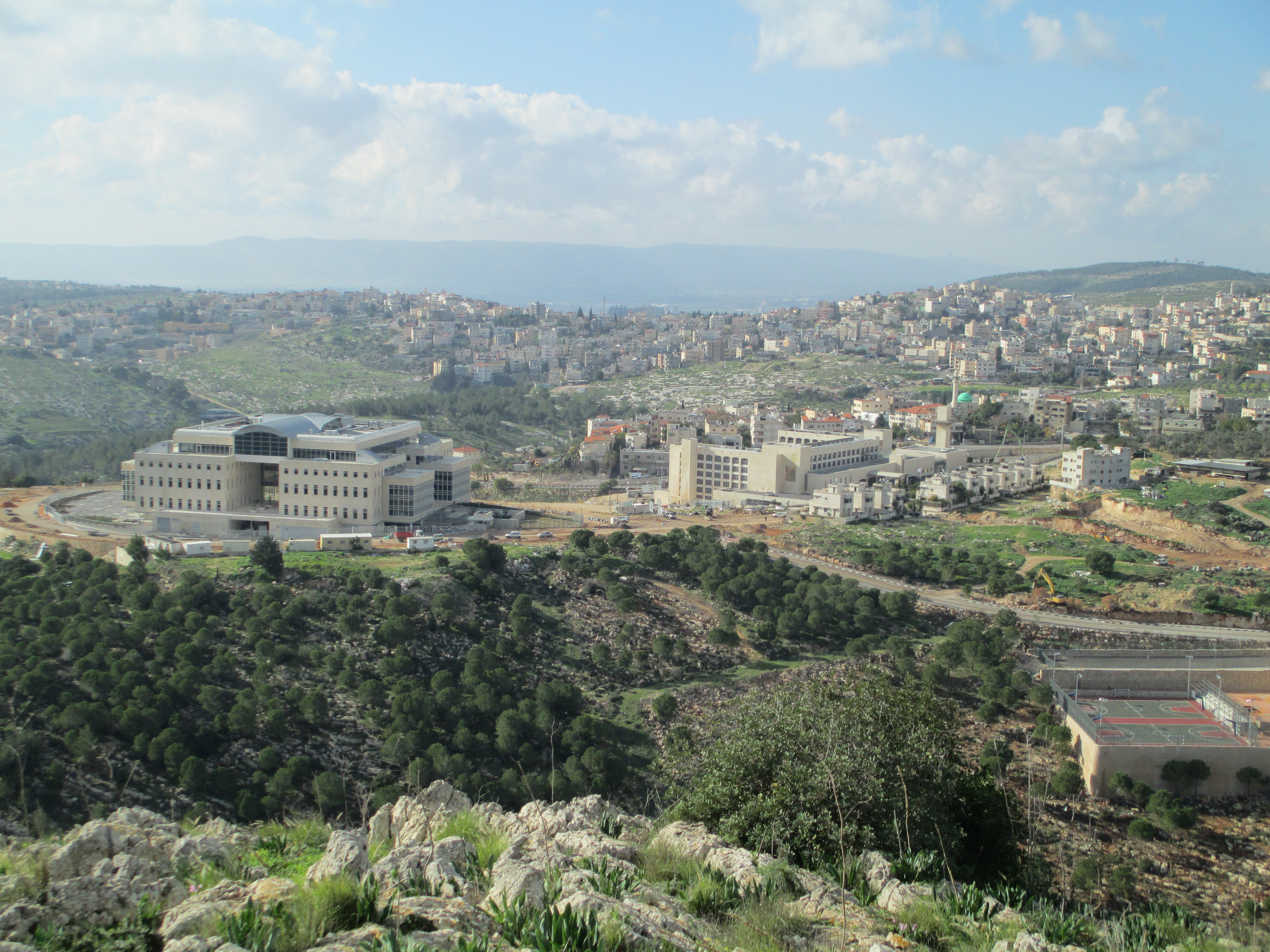
Nazareth Hi-Tech Park

In 2011, Nazareth had over 20 Arab-owned high-tech companies, mostly in the field of software development. According to the Haaretz newspaper the city has been called the "Silicon Valley of the Arab community" in view of its potential in this sphere.

Community-based tourism initiatives in Nazareth have brought Arab and Jewish Israeli residents together through the management of guesthouses and organized tours. Gelbman and Laven (2016) described these efforts as promoting intercommunal cooperation, interpersonal relationships, and more equitable economic development.

== Religious sites ==
=== Christian ===
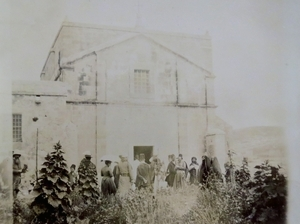
Church in Nazareth on the supposed site of Joseph's workshop, 1891

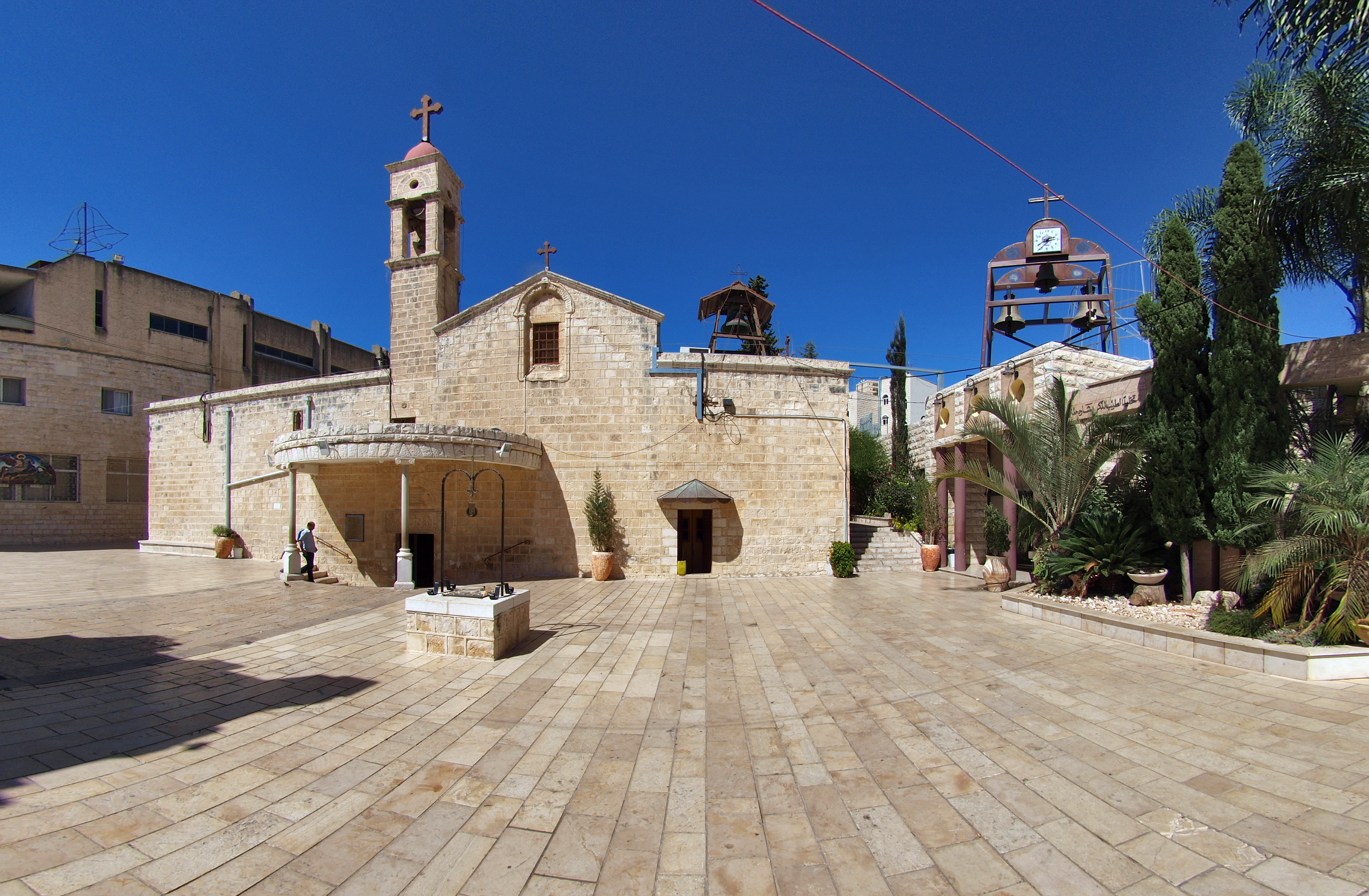
Greek Orthodox Church of the Annunciation

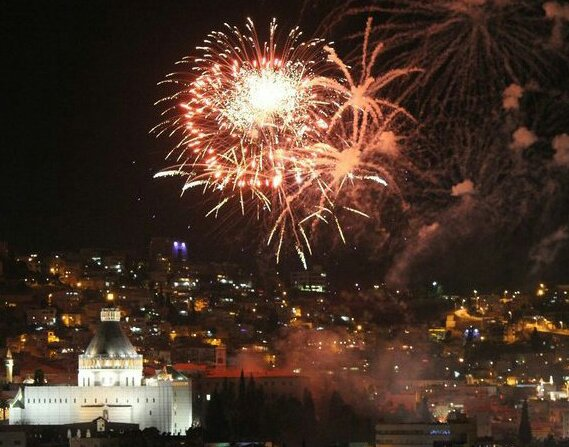
Christmas Eve in Nazareth

Nazareth is home to dozens of monasteries and churches, many of them in the Old City.

- Churches
  - The Church of the Annunciation is the largest Catholic church in the Middle East. In Roman Catholic tradition, it marks the site where the Archangel Gabriel announced the future birth of Jesus to Mary
  - The Church of St. Gabriel is an alternative Greek Orthodox site for the Annunciation
  - The Greek Catholic Church of Nazareth is a Byzantine Rite Catholic church (Greek Catholic Melkite Church)
  - The Synagogue Church is a Melkite Greek Catholic Church at the traditional site of the synagogue where Jesus preached
  - The St. Joseph's Church (Roman Catholic) marks the traditional location for the workshop of Saint Joseph
  - The Mensa Christi Church, run by the Franciscan religious order, commemorates the traditional location where Jesus dined with the Apostles
  - The Basilica of Jesus the Adolescent, run by the Salesian religious order, at the top of the hill overlooking the city from the north
  - The Church of Christ is an Anglican church in Nazareth
  - The Church of Our Lady of the Fright (Roman Catholic) marks the spot where Mary is said to have seen Jesus being taken to a cliff by the congregation of the synagogue
- The Jesus Trail pilgrimage route connects many of the religious sites in Nazareth on a 60 km (37 mi) walking trail which ends in Capernaum
- International Marian Evangelization Center "Mary of Nazareth" (see here:), containing among other things the only archaeologically excavated house from first-century AD Nazareth

=== Muslim ===
Muslim holy sites include

- The Shrine of al-Sheikh Amer
- The Shrine of "to the Prophet we go"
- The Shrine of Shihab ad-Din.

Muslim places of worship include

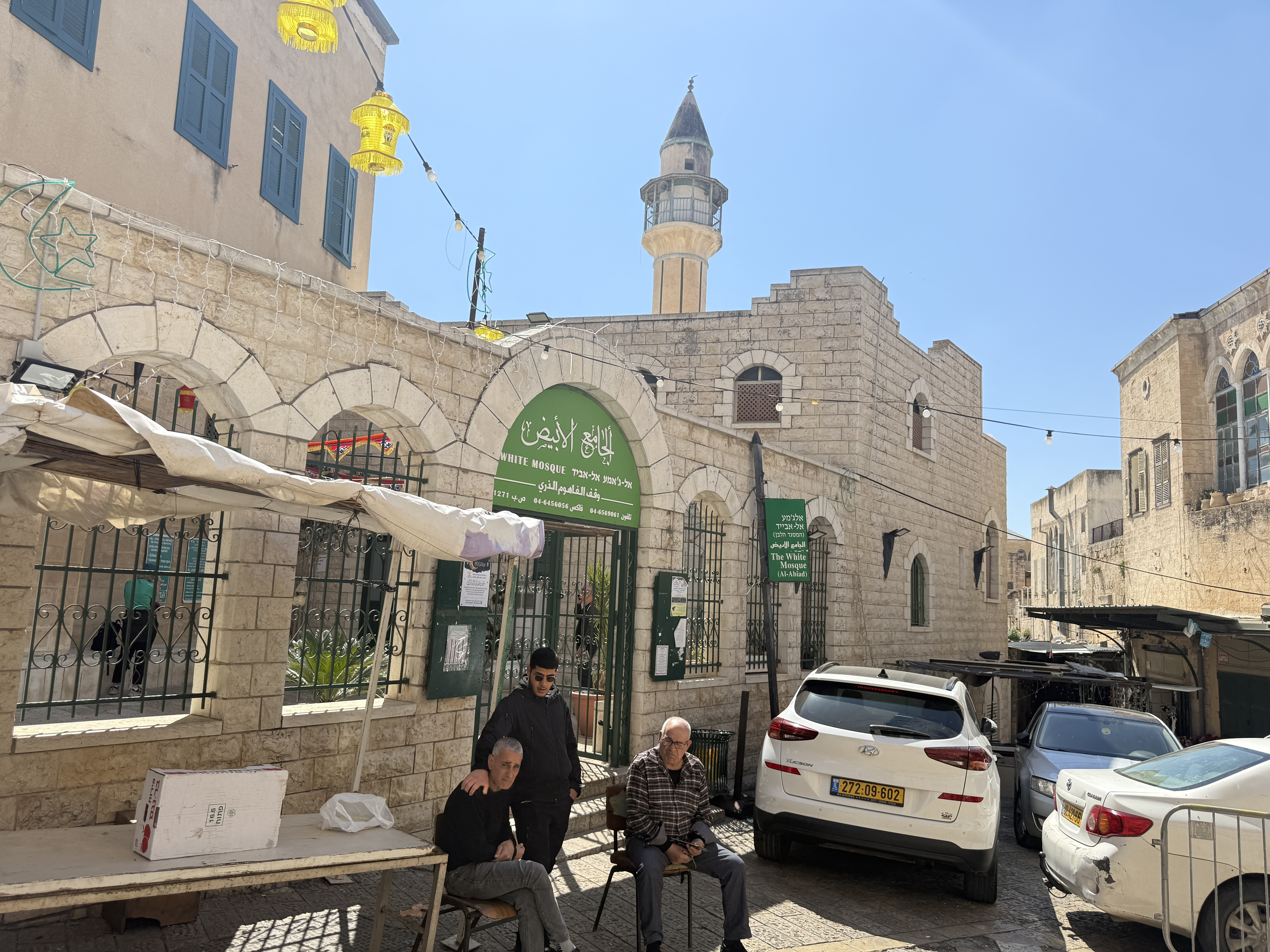
White Mosque is one of mosque in Nazareth

- The White Mosque (Masjid al-Abiad), the oldest mosque in Nazareth, located in Harat Alghama ("Mosque Quarter") in the center of the Old Market.
- Nabi Saeen Mosque (Masjid al-Nabi Saʿīn).
- The Peace Mosque (Masjid al-Salam).

== Archaeology ==
=== "Venerated area" near the Basilica of the Annunciation ===
While excavations conducted prior to 1931 in the Franciscan "venerated area" (the side of the hill known as Jabal Nebi Sa'in, stretching north of the Basilica of the Annunciation) revealed no trace of a Greek or Roman settlement there, later digs under Fr. Bagatti, who acted as the principal archaeologist for the venerated sites in Nazareth, unearthed quantities of later Roman and Byzantine artifacts, attesting to unambiguous human presence there from the 2nd century AD onward. John Dominic Crossan, a noted New Testament scholar, remarked that Bagatti's archaeological drawings indicate just how small the village actually was, suggesting that it was little more than an insignificant hamlet.

=== Early Roman house ===
Remains of a residential house dating to the Early Roman period were discovered in 2009 next to the Basilica of the Annunciation and are on display in the "International Marian Center of Nazareth". According to the Israel Antiquities Authority, "The artifacts recovered from inside the building were few and mostly included fragments of pottery vessels from the Early Roman period (the first and second centuries AD)... Another hewn pit, whose entrance was apparently camouflaged, was excavated and a few pottery sherds from the Early Roman period were found inside it." Archaeologist Yardenna Alexandre adds that "based on other excavations that I conducted in other villages in the region, this pit was probably hewn as part of the preparations by the Jews to protect themselves during the Great Revolt against the Romans in 67 AD".

=== Kokh tombs ===
Noteworthy is that all the post-Iron Age tombs in the Nazareth basin (approximately two dozen) are of the kokh (plural kokhim) or later types; this type probably first appeared in Galilee in the middle of the 1st century AD. Kokh tombs in the Nazareth area have been excavated by B. Bagatti, N. Feig, Z. Yavor, and noted by Z. Gal.

=== Ancient bathhouse at Mary's Well ===
In the mid-1990s, a shopkeeper discovered tunnels under his shop near Mary's Well in Nazareth. The tunnels were identified as the hypocaust of a bathhouse. Excavations in 1997–98 revealed remains dating from the Roman, Crusader, Mamluk and Ottoman periods.

== Local government ==
Nazareth contains a number of official buildings, some of which date back to the Ottoman era in Palestine. One of the most important of these buildings is the Nazareth Brigades, an important historical ruling building from the Ottoman period, built around 1740 by the governor of Galilee, Daher al-Umar, who took it as his own home and as the Ottoman rule building, from which he supervised security in Marj Ibn Amer. The building housed stables and a prison. The building became the seat of the municipality of Nazareth after the Nakba in 1948 until the beginning of the 1990s, when the municipal headquarters moved to another place in the city.

The Municipality is ruled since 24 June 2025 by Yaakov Efrati.

== Education ==
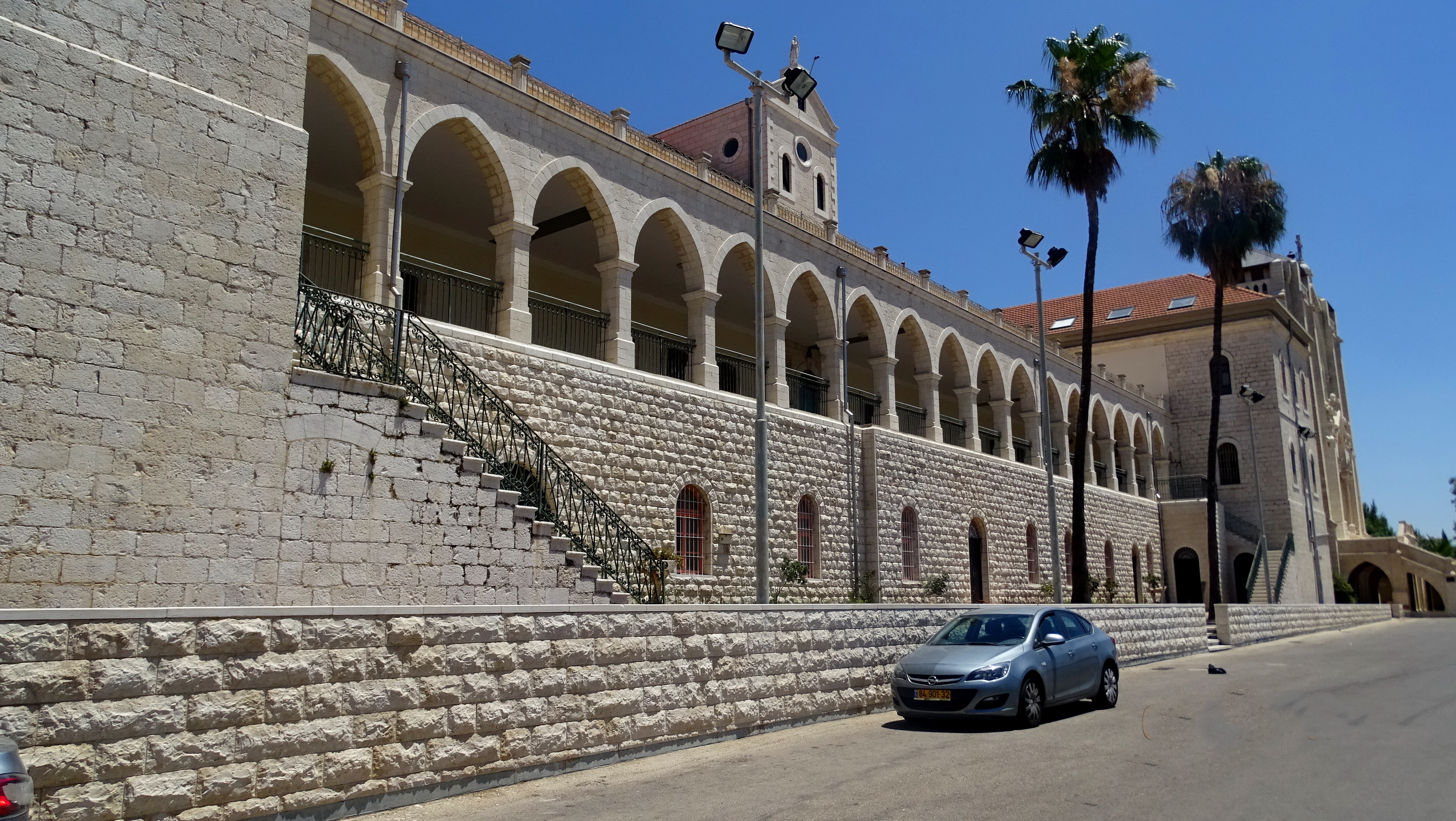
Don Bosco School

With the near total depopulation of the Palestinian Arabs in the major cities of Haifa and Jaffa as a result of the 1948 war, Nazareth, Kafr Yasif and Rameh became one of a few towns in the newly-established state of Israel to emerge as a central space for Arab culture and politics.

Three prestigious Arab Christian schools in Nazareth are the St. Joseph's Eclerical School, run by the Melkite Greek Catholic Church, the Nuns of St. Joseph School, a Catholic institution, and the Nazareth Baptist High School, a Protestant institution. About half of students in Nazareth attend Christian schools (10 schools) that are found in the city. Christian schools in Nazareth are among the best schools in the country, and while those schools represent only 4% of the Arab schooling sector, about 34% of Arab university students come from Christian schools. These Arab Christian schools accommodate Christian students, Muslims, Druze from across the country.

== Healthcare ==
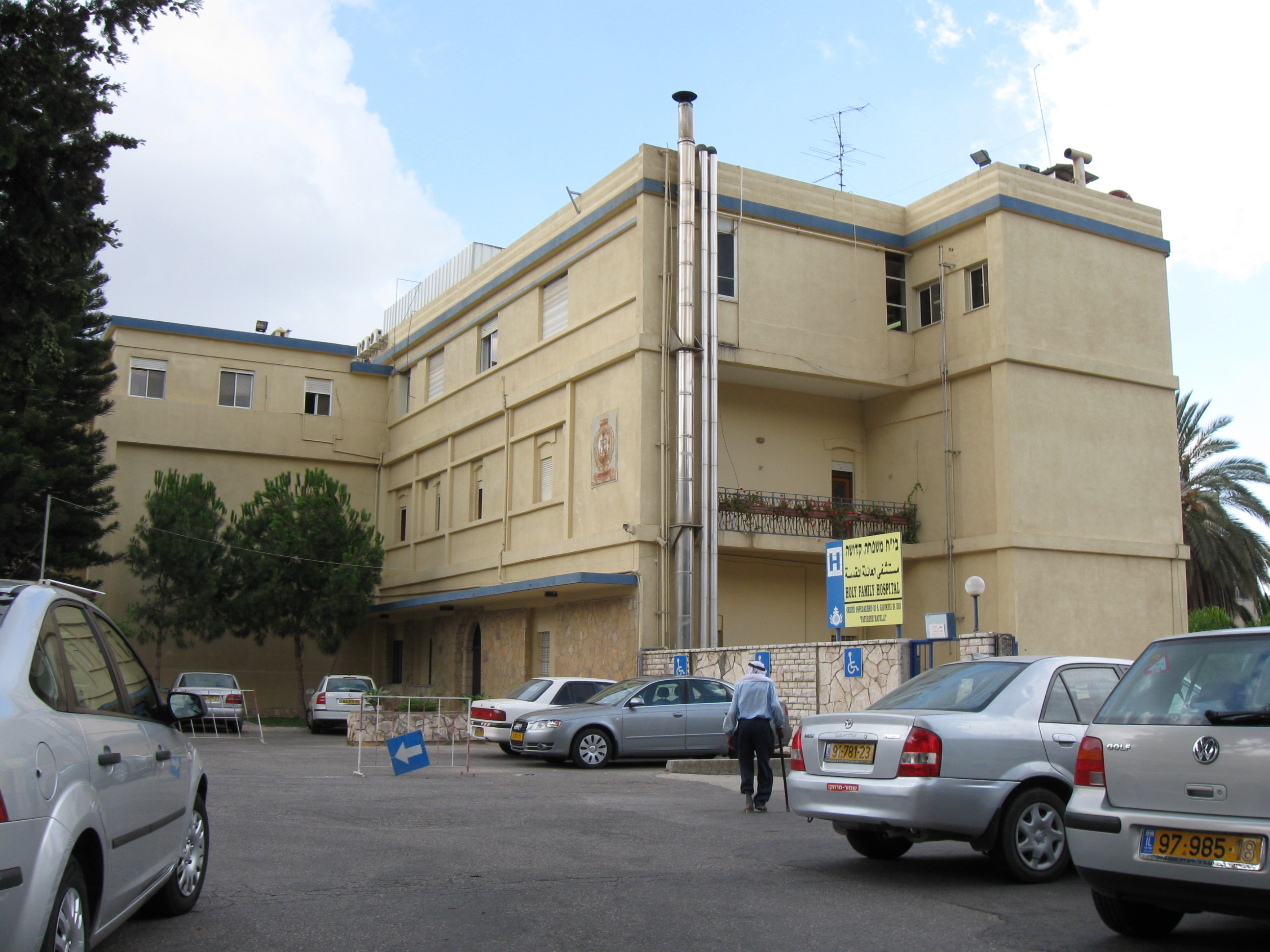
Italian Nazareth Hospital

The city has three hospitals, run by the Christian community of Nazareth, and serving its districts:

- The Nazareth Hospital (also called the English Hospital)
- French Nazareth Hospital
- Italian Nazareth Hospital

== Sports ==
The city's main football club, Ahi Nazareth, currently plays in Liga Leumit, the second tier of Israeli football. The club spent two seasons in the top division, in 2003–04 and again in 2009–10. They are based at the Ilut Stadium in nearby Ilut.

Other local clubs are Al-Nahda Nazareth, which currently plays in Liga Bet, and Beitar al-Amal Nazareth, Hapoel Bnei Nazareth and Hapoel al-Ittihad Nazareth, which all play in Liga Gimel.

== Voting patterns ==
In the 2022 election, 93 percent of voters in Nazareth voted for the Arab parties, while 4 percent voted for the parties of the center-left coalition led by Yair Lapid and 3 percent voted for the parties of the right-wing coalition led by Benjamin Netanyahu. Among the voters for the Arab parties, 49 percent voted for the Hadash–Ta'al list, while 28 percent voted for Balad and 23 percent voted for Ra'am.

In the 2026 election, 94 percent of voters in Nazareth voted for the Arab parties, while 5 percent voted for the parties of the center-left coalition led by Gadi Eisenkot and 1 percent voted for the parties of the right-wing coalition led by Benjamin Netanyahu. Among the voters for the Arab parties, 78 percent voted for the Joint List, while 22 percent voted for Ra'am. Voter turnout increased 56 percent from the 2022 election.

== Twin towns – sister cities ==
Nazareth is twinned with:

- Baguio, Philippines
- Częstochowa, Poland
- Florence, Italy
- Nablus, Palestine
- Neubrandenburg, Germany

=== Other cooperation ===
- Loreto, Italy (the Sanctuary of the Annunciation in Nazareth and the Sanctuary of the Incarnation in Loreto are twinned)

== See also ==
- List of Arab localities in Israel
- Nazareth Village
- Nazareth Iris (plant)
- Sisters of Nazareth Convent from Nazareth
