= Basilica of Jesus the Adolescent =

Catholic Church in Nazareth, Israel

Coordinates: 32.7069°N 35.2947°E

- كنيسة السالزيان כנסייה הסלזיאנית
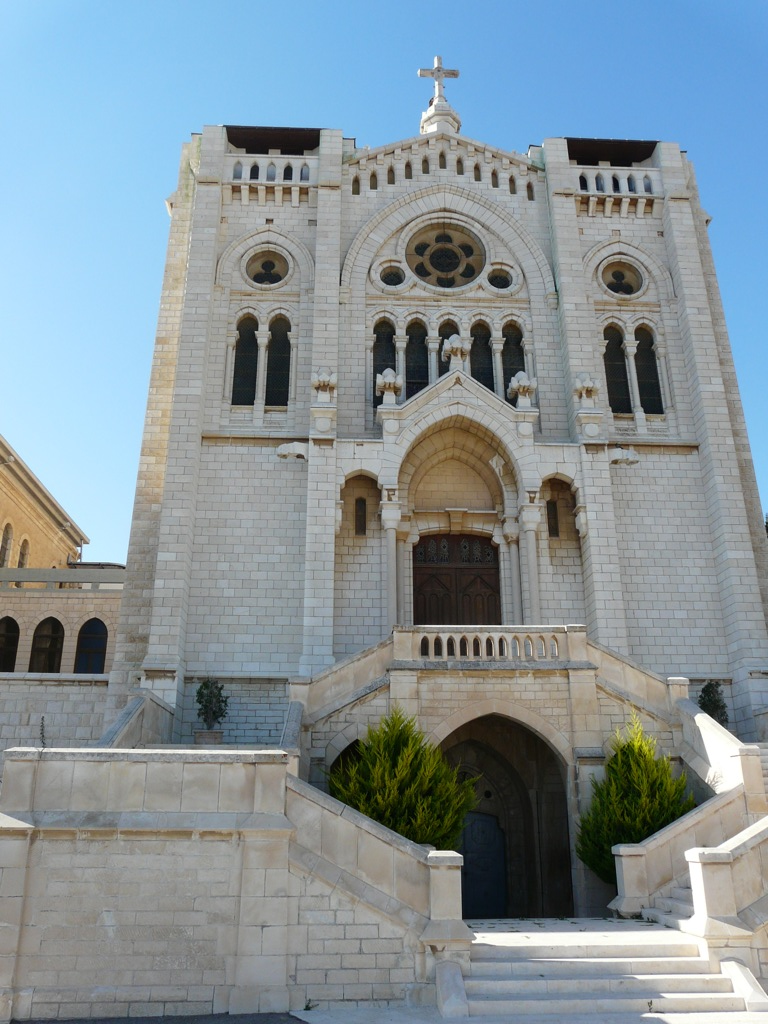
- Basilica of Jesus the Adolescent
- Location: Nazareth
- Country: Israel
- Denomination: Roman Catholic Church

Architecture
- Architect: Lucien Gauthier (1861–1925)

The Basilica of Jesus the Adolescent, also known as the Salesian church (Arabic: كنيسة السالزيان; Hebrew: כנסייה הסלזיאנית) is a Catholic church in Nazareth in Israel, belonging to the Salesians of Don Bosco. The church is located next to the school of the Salesians. Built in Gothic style between 1906 and 1923 on a hill called "Mount of the Start," which overlooks the city, this church is where, according to tradition, Jesus spent his youth.

From the terrace of the church there is an exceptional view of the old city of Nazareth.

== See also ==
- Roman Catholicism in Israel
- Holy Family Church (disambiguation)
