= Skunk (disambiguation) =

A skunk is an animal.

Skunk may also refer to:

== Geography ==
- Skunk Creek (Gooseberry River), Minnesota
- Skunk Creek (Peruque Creek), Missouri
- Skunk Creek (South Dakota)
- Skunk River (Platte River), Minnesota
- Skunk River (Iowa), Iowa, a tributary of the Mississippi

== Arts, entertainment, and media ==
=== Music ===
- Skunk (album), an album by Dutch band Doe Maar
- Skunk (band), a band formed in 1986 by musician Matt Sweeney
- Skunk Anansie, a British rock band formed in 1994
- Skunk Records, a California-based record label from 1990 to 2006
- Jeff "Skunk" Baxter, former Doobie Brothers and Steely Dan guitarist

=== Other arts, entertainment, and media ===
- KUNK, an American radio station branded "The Skunk FM"
- Skunk (community), a Swedish social networking website

== Other uses ==
- Skunk 11, a Canadian sailboat design of the 1960s
- Skunk (Cannabis strain)
- Skunk clownfish (disambiguation), several species of anemonefish that have a white stripe from nose to tail
- Skunk (weapon), a malodorant used by the Israeli Defense Forces for crowd control
- Skunk rule, another name for the mercy rule in sports
- In cribbage, a player losing by more than 30 points is 'skunked'
- Skunk Train, a popular nickname for the California Western Railroad
- Skunk, nickname of Jeff Baxter, American musician and defense consultant

== See also ==
- SCO Skunkware, a collection of open source software projects
- Skunked beer, beer that has been exposed to ultraviolet light, like sunlight, too long
- Skunked term, a word or phrase that has become ambiguous, thus difficult to use
- Skunkworks (disambiguation)
