= Muhammad Sharif Odeh =

Amir of the Ahmadi sect in the Holy Land

- محمد شريف عودة

Amir of the Ahmadiyya Muslim Community in the Holy Land
- Incumbent
- Assumed office 1999

Personal details
- Born: Kababir, Haifa, Israel
- Education: Islamic theology

Muhammad Sharif Odeh (Arabic: محمد شريف عودة; Hebrew: מוחמד שריף עודה) is a Muslim religious leader who has serves as the Amir (head) of the Ahmadiyya Muslim Community in the Holy Land, which includes communities in Israel and the Palestinian territories, since 1999. He is based in the Kababir neighbourhood of Haifa and has participated in interfaith and community events.

== Early life ==
Odeh was born in the Kababir neighbourhood of Haifa, a mixed-religion area historically associated with the Ahmadiyya Muslim movement. According to biographical information from the University of Haifa’s Laboratory for Religious Studies, he grew up in the Ahmadiyya community and studied with local community teachers before holding leadership roles such as chairman of the community’s Youth Council. He was elected Amir of the Ahmadiyya Muslim Community in the Holy Land in 1999.

== Leadership and activities ==
As Amir, Odeh oversees religious and administrative affairs for the Ahmadiyya Muslim Community in Israel and the Palestinian territories. According to community reports, he has spoken about the history and principles of the Ahmadiyya movement in public settings, including a June 2023 event at the University of Haifa library where he described the community’s activities and international connections.

Under his leadership, the Ahmadiyya community in Kababir has organised annual conventions aimed at promoting unity and dialogue among participants from diverse religious backgrounds. The 28th such convention was reported to have included attendees of different faiths and featured speeches by Odeh about social cohesion.

== Interfaith engagement ==
Odeh has been noted as a participant in interfaith forums in Haifa. A multi-faith statement from religious leaders in the city lists him alongside representatives from other religious communities.

== Public positions ==
Odeh has publicly criticised extremist interpretations of religion and expressed support for peaceful coexistence between different communities. At the Ahmadiyya community’s 28th annual convention in Haifa, he spoke about the need to confront fanaticism and racism, stating that such gatherings “allow us to engage in dialogue and find common ground” among people of different backgrounds. He described unity and mutual respect as essential in a society where people “live together in workplaces, schools, universities, hospitals, and pharmacies.”

In other public statements, Odeh defended the islamic faith against accusations and generalizations saying that such claims are harmful and do not reflect the beliefs of the broader Muslim population. He has also highlighted the relative religious freedom enjoyed by Ahmadis in the holy land ,compared to other parts of the Middle East and criticised violence in both local and global contexts, advocating respect for human rights and peaceful relations among different religious communities.

He has described efforts to teach universal peace, harmony, and cooperation as central to his community’s approach, and has emphasised that interpretations of Islam that promote violence are inconsistent with their beliefs.

=== Media appearances ===
Odeh regularly hosts and appears on the Arabic television programme الحوار المباشر (Al-Hiwar-ul-Mubashir, "Direct dialogue"), a discussion show broadcast on MTA3, the Ahmadiyya Muslim Community’s international television channel. The programme features live discussion of religious topics with guests, and episodes presented by Odeh have been recorded as recently as February 2025.

== See also ==
- Ahmadiyya in Israel
- Kababir
- Mahmood Mosque, Haifa
