= Skunk Creek =

Skunk Creek may refer to:

- Skunk Creek (Gooseberry River), a stream in Minnesota
- Skunk Creek (Peruque Creek), a stream in Missouri
- Skunk Creek (South Dakota), a stream in South Dakota
- Skunk Creek (Fair Oaks Ranch), a spring-fed stream in Fair Oaks Ranch, TX with its headway starting at the Fair Oaks Ranch Country Club traversing through hill country and emptying into the Cibolo Creek along the historic Pinta Trail. Renamed in 2017 by the Proulx brothers and now known as "Sweetwind Creek".
