= Islam in Israel =

Israeli Muslims المسلمون الإسرائيليين מוסלמים ישראלים
Total population
- ~1,750,000 (18.1% of the Israeli population) (2022 estimate)

Regions with significant populations
- Israel

Languages
- Arabic, English, Hebrew

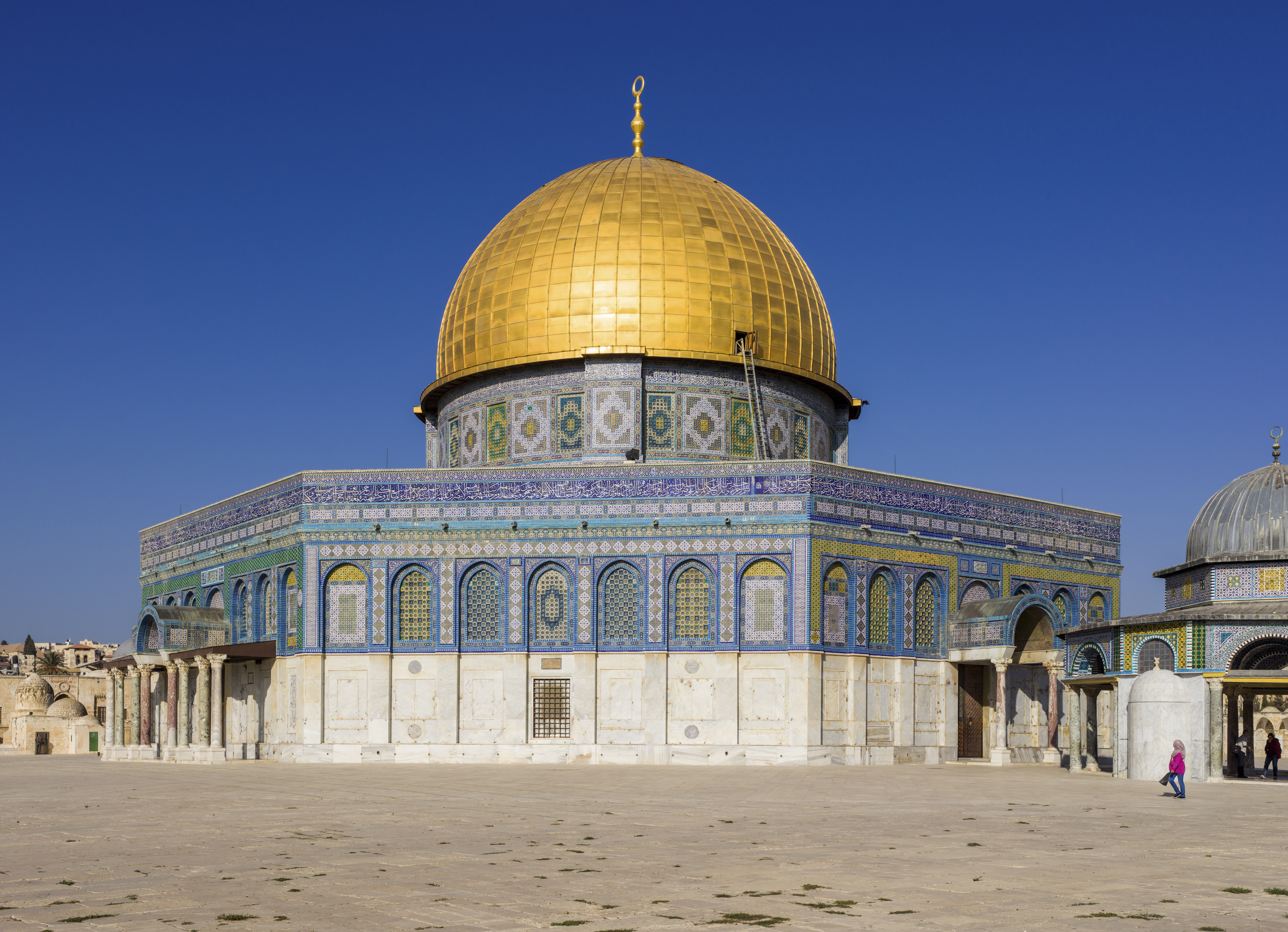
The Dome of the Rock, an Islamic shrine built on the Temple Mount in 692 AD, during the Umayyad-era Second Fitna.

Islam is the second-largest religion in Israel, after Judaism. As of 2022, Muslims made up to 18.1% of the country's total population. Most of this figure is represented by the Arab citizens of Israel, who are the country's largest ethnic minority, but there is a notable non-Arab Muslim populace, such as that of the Circassians. Upwards of 99% of Israel's Muslims are Sunnis and the remainder are Ahmadis. Despite Shias constituting the second-largest Islamic sect, there are no reliable sources attesting a Shia presence in Israel or the Israeli-occupied West Bank, which the Israeli government administers as the Judea and Samaria Area. There were only seven Shia villages in the entirety of Mandatory Palestine and all of these were located along what is now the Israel–Lebanon border before being depopulated during the 1948 Arab–Israeli War.

In 2015, the Israel Democracy Institute conducted a survey on the religiosity of Israeli people with Islamic background: 47% identified as traditional, 32% identified as religious, 17% identified as not religious at all, and 3% identified as very religious. In recent years, the average age at marriage has risen, and Muslim women hold more degrees than their male counterparts.

== Background ==
=== Ottoman Empire ===
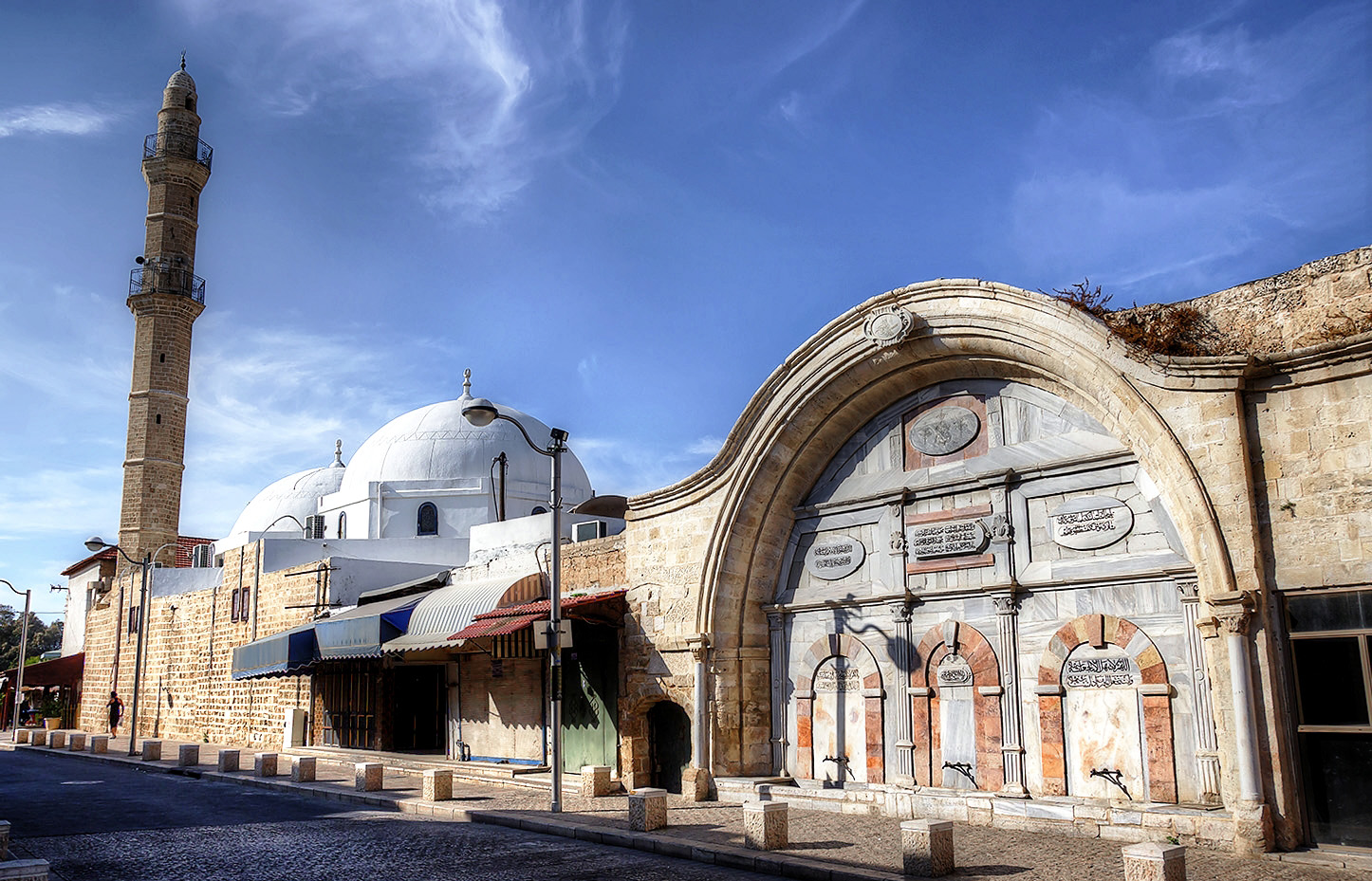
Mahmoudiya Mosque in Jaffa, Tel Aviv

During the time of Ottoman rule, Palestine had a large Muslim majority and a number of religious minority communities, mainly Christians and Jews. Many of these non-Muslim communities were accorded the status of Millet (nation/religion). The recognized Millet communities were granted a large measure of autonomy in the handling of its internal affairs, including administration of its holy places, the appointment of clergy, and regulating the personal status of the members of the community. Conflicts over the ownership of the holy places were protected by a Status Quo principle. Whatever community controlled the holy place at the time of the Ottoman conquest, had the right to maintain this control. Islam was the religion of the Ottoman state and the Sultan was also the Caliph and the Commander of the Faithful. The Muslim community did not enjoy any autonomous position, similar to the recognized religious communities, nor was there any need for such a status for the majority Sunni Muslims. The Ottomans generally followed the Hanafi school of Islamic jurisprudence (madhab) but other schools were also accepted. Muslim minorities, such as Alevi, Twelver Shia, Alawi and Druze had no official recognition and were at times persecuted.

=== British Mandate ===
Both the Millet system and the Status Quo principle continued to be upheld by the British Mandate authorities (1922–48). All the communities recognized by the Ottoman authorities continued to be recognized by the British. Since the British Empire was Anglican Christian, the British rule affected the position of Islam in Palestine. Islam was no longer the governing religion of the country, although it was still the majority religion. The Mandatory authorities did not formally grant Islam the status of a Millet community, but it instituted a Supreme Muslim Council, that ensured the Islamic religion an autonomy equal to that of the Millet religions. The British also introduced the office of Grand Mufti of Jerusalem and appointed Haj Amin al-Husseini (1895–1974) to this position.

== History ==
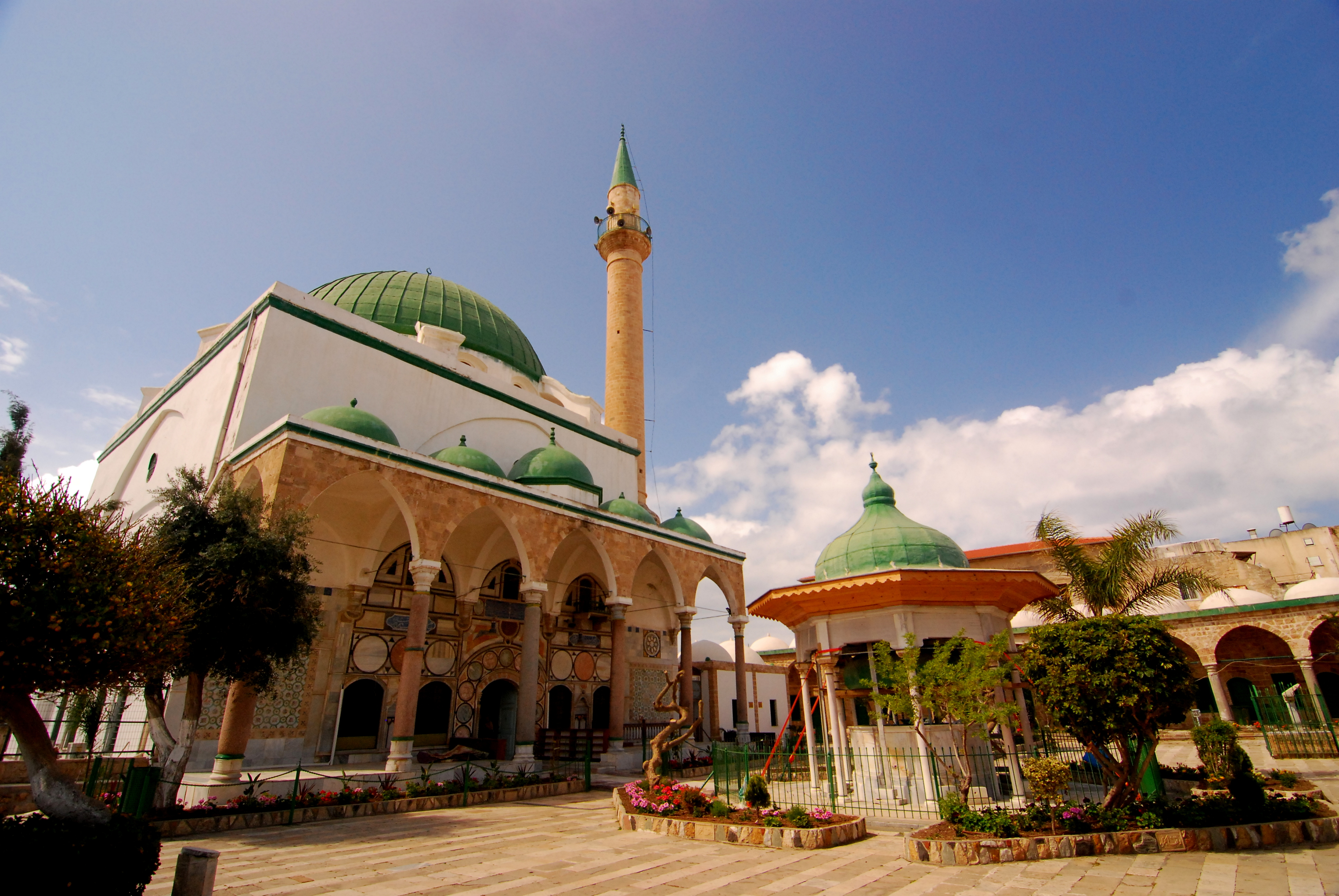
Al-Jazzar Mosque in Acre, Israel

During the 1948 Arab-Israeli war, more than 80 percent of the Arab Palestinian population in Israel fled or were expelled from their towns and villages, including a large section of the economic, political, cultural, and religious elite of the Muslim society. Only one member of the Supreme Muslim Council, Tahir at-Tabari, remained in the Israeli-held part of Palestine. The Israeli government prohibited a resurrection of a national institution similar to the Supreme Muslim Council, or an office similar to that of the Grand Mufti and thereby effectively abolished the autonomy of the Muslim community.

Israel recognized the Druze community as an independent religious community in 1956 and then again in 1963 formally as a Millet community within the meaning of the Palestine Order-in-Council 1922 (POC – the constitutional document of Mandatory Palestine, partially retained by the State of Israel). Similarly, the Evangelical Episcopal Church in Israel and the Baháʼí Faith were also recognized in 1970 and 1971, respectively, as Millet communities.

Islam, however, was not granted a similar recognition by the Israeli authorities. Although the Shari’ah courts were recognized and integrated into the Israeli judicial system, the Muslim community itself was never recognized as a Millet community within the meaning of the POC, nor was its status formally regulated in any other Israeli statute.

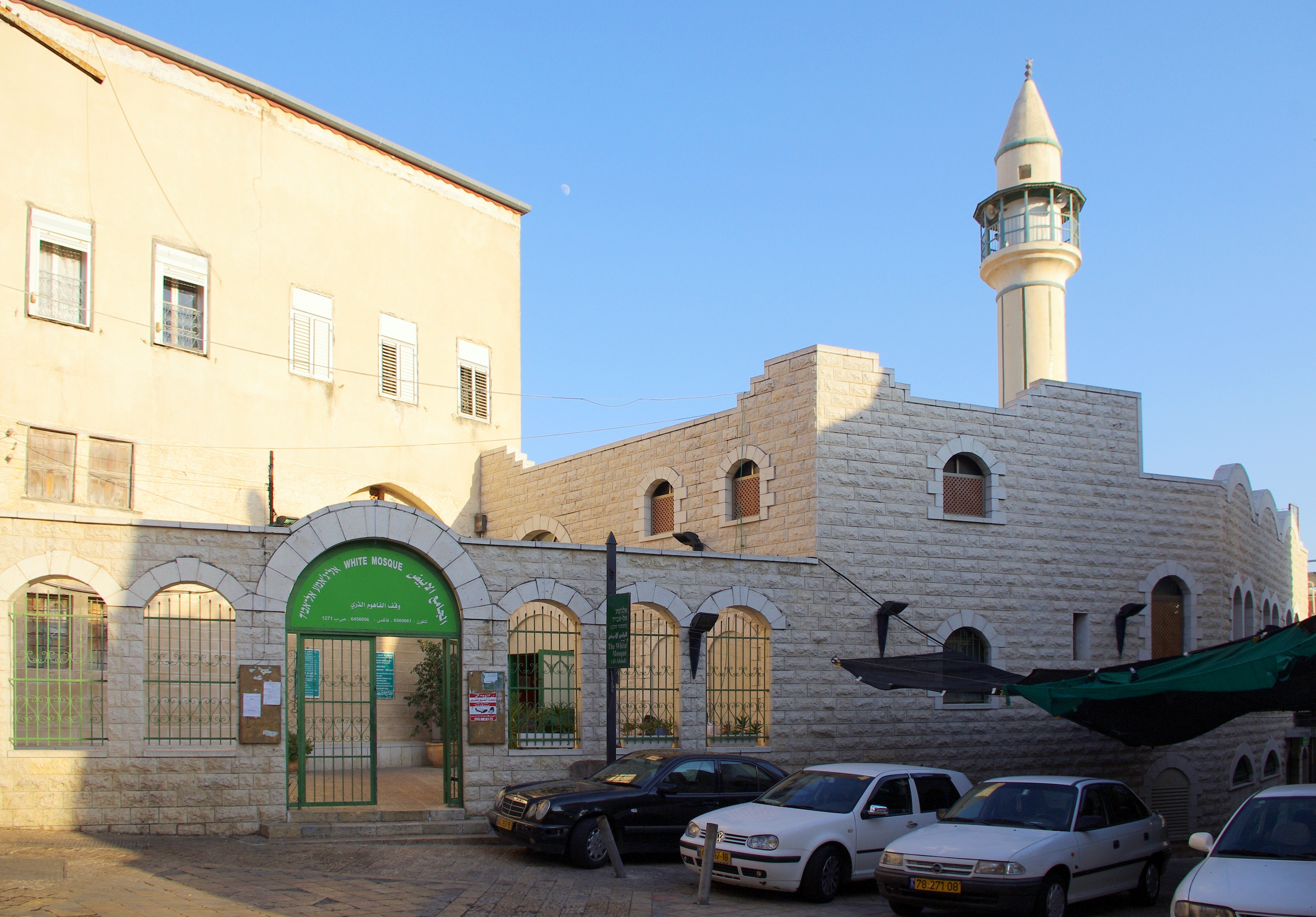
White Mosque, Nazareth

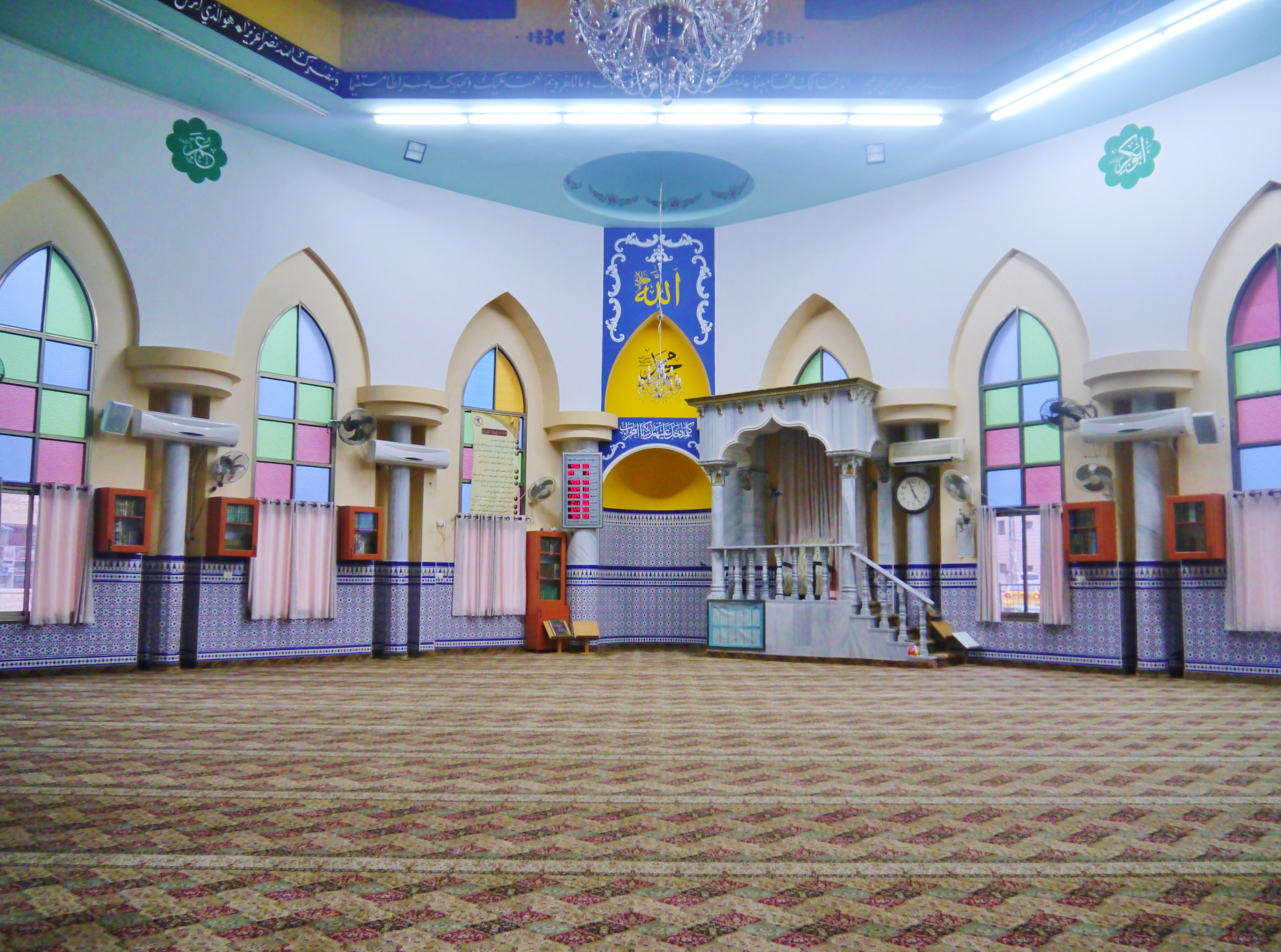
Abu Bakr Mosque in Sakhnin

Instead, the affairs of the Muslim community were to a large extent controlled directly by the Israeli government. Muslim Shari'a courts thus continued to operate in Israel and the authorities generally did not interfere in its day-to-day operation. In the 1940s and 1950s, Qadis were appointed by the Minister of Religious Affairs. In 1961 the government finally passed the Qadi law, which established a nine-member Appointment Committee, of whom five members should be Muslims by religion.

According to the Qadis law of 1961, the President of the State of Israel appointed Qadis, on the recommendation of the Minister of Religious Affairs (later the Minister of Justice). The candidate was selected by the Qadi Appointments Committee, consisting of nine members, five of whom (later six) had to be Muslims. But the Muslim members were not to be appointed by the Muslim community itself, in contrast to the recognized Millet communities. Seven of the nine members (and four of the six Muslim members) were to be appointed by the Government, the Knesset, or the Israel Bar Association, bodies dominated by the Jewish majority of Israel. The remaining two Muslim members were the president of the Sharia Court of Appeal and a second acting Qadi, selected by the body of Qadis in Israel.

Of the 14 Qadis appointed between 1948 and 1990, eleven were employees, or sons of employees, of the Ministry of Religious Affairs. Only two had completed legal training and only two held university degrees.

The U.S. State Department's International Religious Freedom Report 2009 criticized Israel for denying Islam (as well as major Protestant communities) the status of a recognized religious community.

== Demographics ==
Population pyramid of Israel's Muslim population, 2021

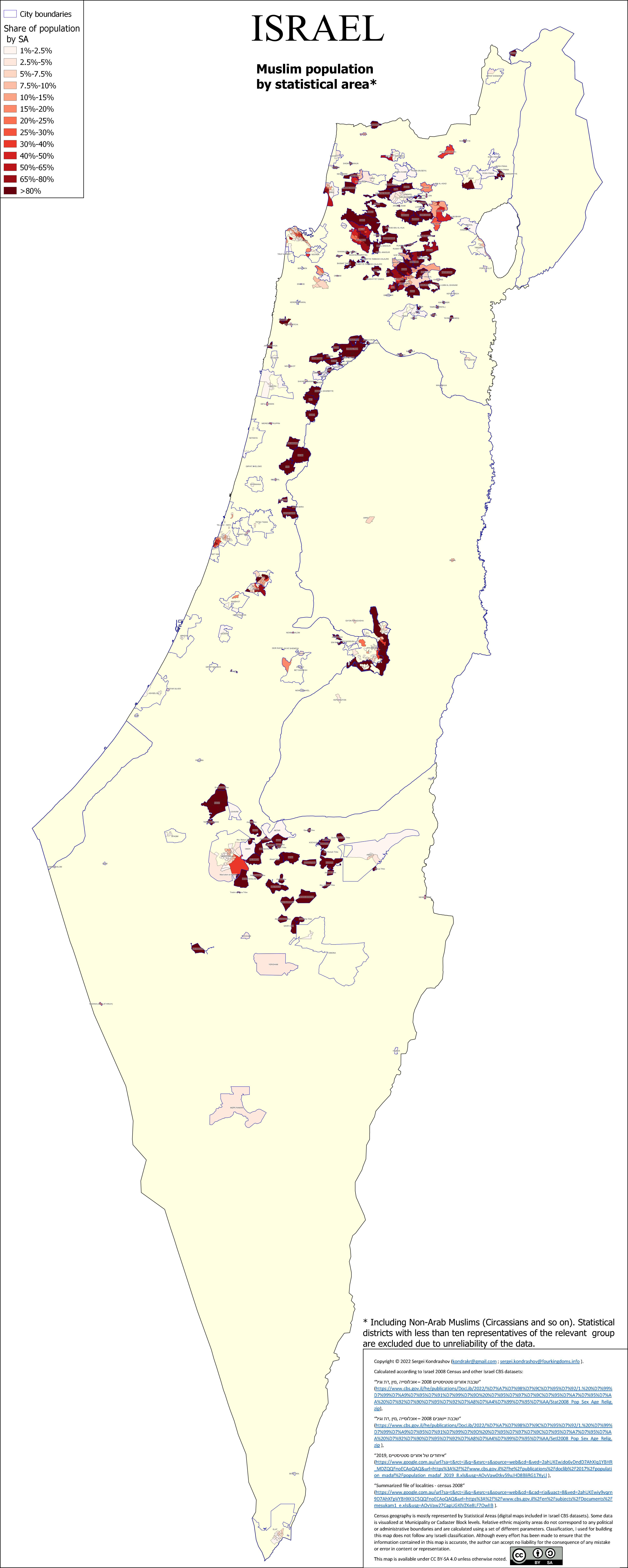
Geographical distribution of the Arab Muslim and non-Arab Muslim populations of Israel by statistical area, 2022

=== Ethnicities and locales ===
Muslims comprise 18.1% of the Israeli population as of 2022. The majority of Muslims in Israel are Sunni Arabs, with an Ahmadiyya minority. The Bedouin in Israel are also Arab Muslims, with some Bedouin clans participating in the Israeli army. The small Circassian community is composed of Sunni Muslims uprooted from the North Caucasus in the late 19th century. In addition, smaller populations of Kurdish, Romani and Turkish Muslims also live in Israel.

Rahat, had the largest number of Muslim residents (71,300) in Israel, while Umm Al-Fahm and Nazareth had around 56,000 and 55,600 residents, respectively. The eleven towns of the Triangle area are home to approximately 250,000 Arab Muslims.

In 2020; approximately 35.2% of the Arab Muslim population lived in the Northern District, 21.9% in the Jerusalem District, 17.1% in the Central District, 13.7% in the Haifa District, 10.9% in the Southern District, and 1.2% lived in the Tel Aviv District. The Israeli Muslim population is young: around 33.4% of the Muslim population in Israel are of people aged 14 and under, while the percentage of people aged 65 and over is 4.3%, and the Muslim population in Israel had the highest fertility rate (3.16) compared with other religious communities.

At the end of 2021, the Muslim population of Israel was estimated to be 18.1% of all residents in the country, enumerating 1.707 million. The growth rate for Muslims in Israel annually was 2.1% in 2021, and the total fertility rate (TFR) fell from 3.16 births per woman in 2019, to 2.99 births per woman by 2020. There were 395,348 Muslim students in both primary and secondary education in Israel in 2021. Nearly one-third, 28%, of Muslim households in Israel have six or more people residing inside them.

=== Sunni ===
Sunni Islam is by far the largest Islamic group in the country. Most Israeli Muslims share the same school of thought with many Sunnis in the Levant (Shafi'i), even though there is also a Hanafi presence as well. There is a strong community of Sufis in several parts of the country, and Sufism has garnered attention from non-Muslim Israelis. An annual Sufi Festival in the Ashram Desert in Negev is dedicated to Sufi arts and traditions.

=== Shia ===
During the British rule in Mandatory Palestine, there were seven Shia Twelver majority villages in northern Israel, near the border with Lebanon. They were deserted during the 1948 Arab–Israeli War, in which the residents of those seven villages fled to neighboring Lebanon as refugees. Because of this, Twelver Shias are a very tiny minority in Israel.

=== Ahmadiyya ===
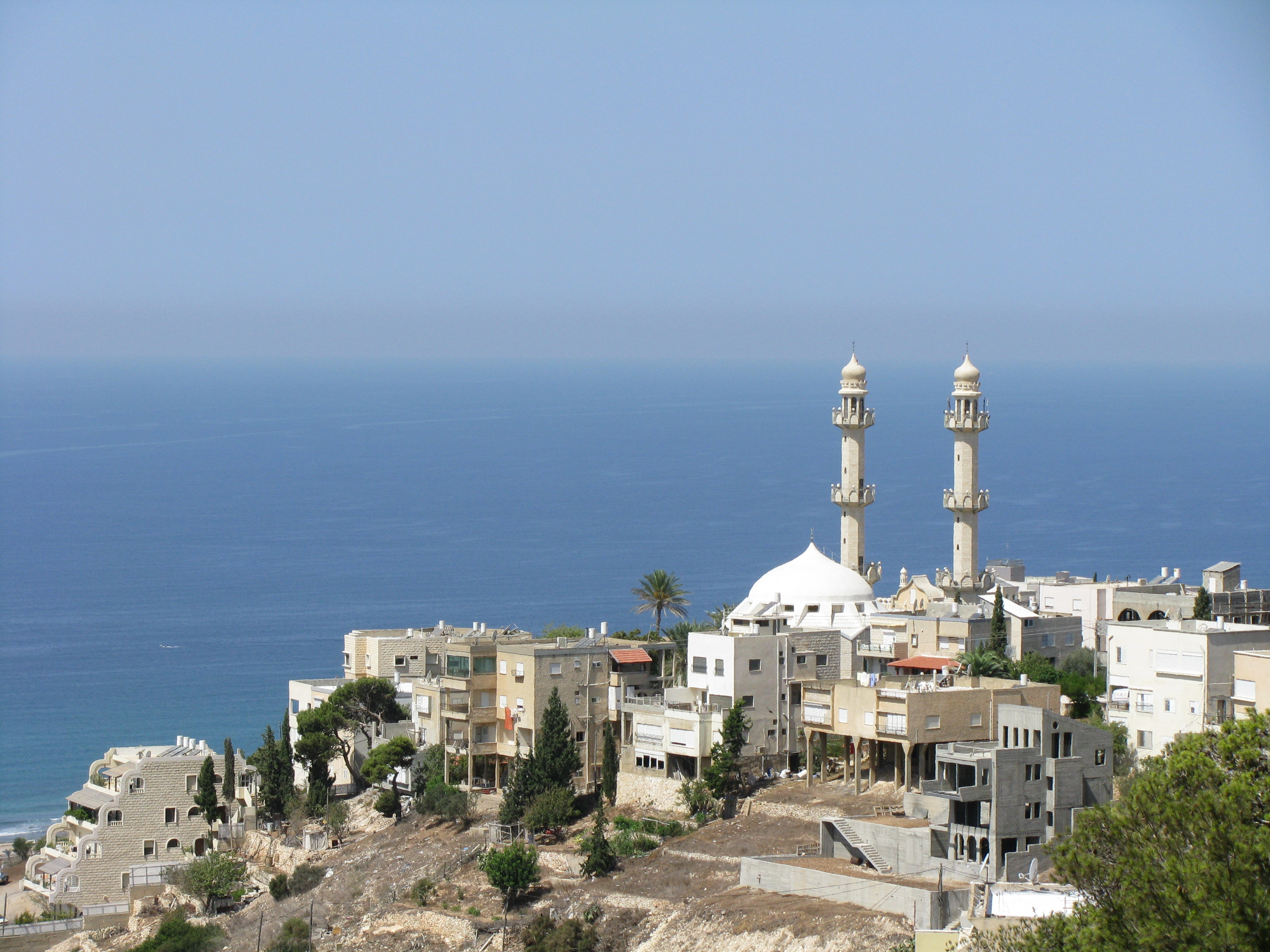
Mahmood Mosque in Kababir, a mixed Ahmadi and Jewish neighbourhood in Haifa

The city of Haifa in Israel acts as the Middle East headquarters of the reformist Ahmadiyya Islamic movement. Kababir, a mixed neighbourhood of Jews and Ahmadi Arabs is the only one of its kind in the country. There are about 2,200 Ahmadis in Kababir.

== Discrimination ==
In a 2015 survey, 79% of Arabs say there is a lot of discrimination against Muslims in Israel. 38% of Muslims report having experienced at least one incident of discrimination within 12 months, including being questioned by security officials (17%), being prevented from traveling (15%), physically threatened or attacked (15%), or having suffered property damage (13%) because of their religion.

The survey also asked about positive interactions, slightly more than a quarter (26%) of Arab Muslims saying a Jew has expressed concern or sympathy toward them in the past year because of their religious identity.

Jewish public opinion is divided on whether Israel can serve as a homeland for Jews while also accommodating the country's Arab minority. Nearly half (48%) of Israeli Jews say Arabs should be expelled or transferred from Israel, including roughly one-in-five Jewish adults who strongly agree with this position.

== Education ==
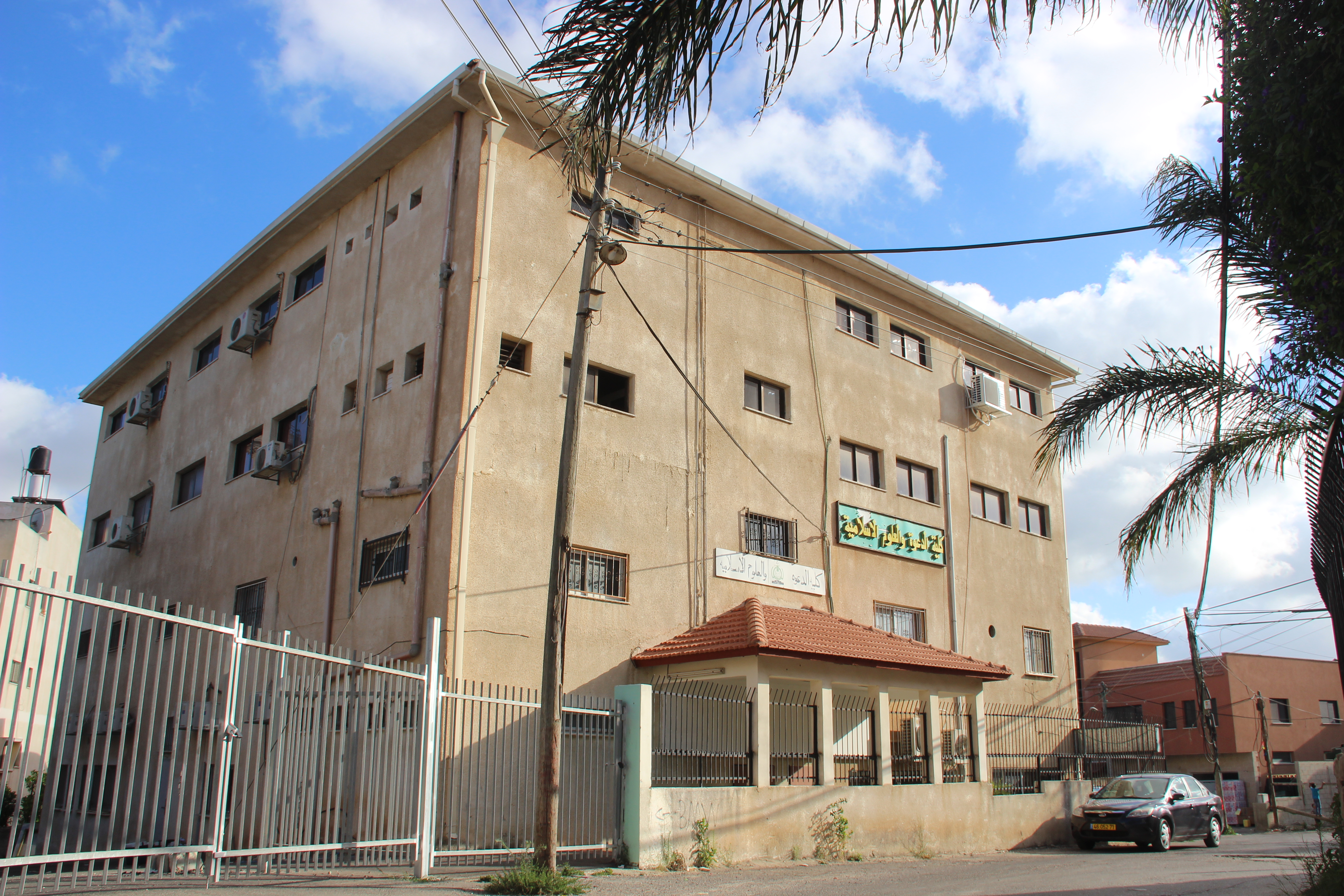
Islamic college in Umm al-Fahm, part of the Haifa District

According to study published by Pew Research Center in 2016, 15% of Muslims in Israel have a college degree, which was lower than the number of Jews (33%), but similar to the number of Christians (18%) and Druze (20%) with a degree. The overwhelming majority of Muslims believe that giving their children a good secular education is very/somewhat important (93%). 53% of Muslims say “science and religion are in conflict,” which was lower than the number of Jews agreeing with that statement (58%). On the particular topic of evolution, 38% of Muslims believe humans and other living things have evolved over time. More Muslims in Israel believe in evolution than Christians (37%) and Druze (24%), but fewer than Jews (53%).

According to the Israeli Central Bureau of Statistics census in 2020, 60.3% of Muslims in Israel were entitled to a matriculation certificate, which was lower than the number of Christians (83.6%), Jews (80.2%) and Druze (79.9%) with a matriculation certificate. According to the Israeli Central Bureau of Statistics census in 2020, 10% of Muslims in Israel have a college degree, which was lower than the number of Christians (70.9%), but similar to the number of Druze (15.3%) with a degree.

== Religiosity, beliefs or practices ==
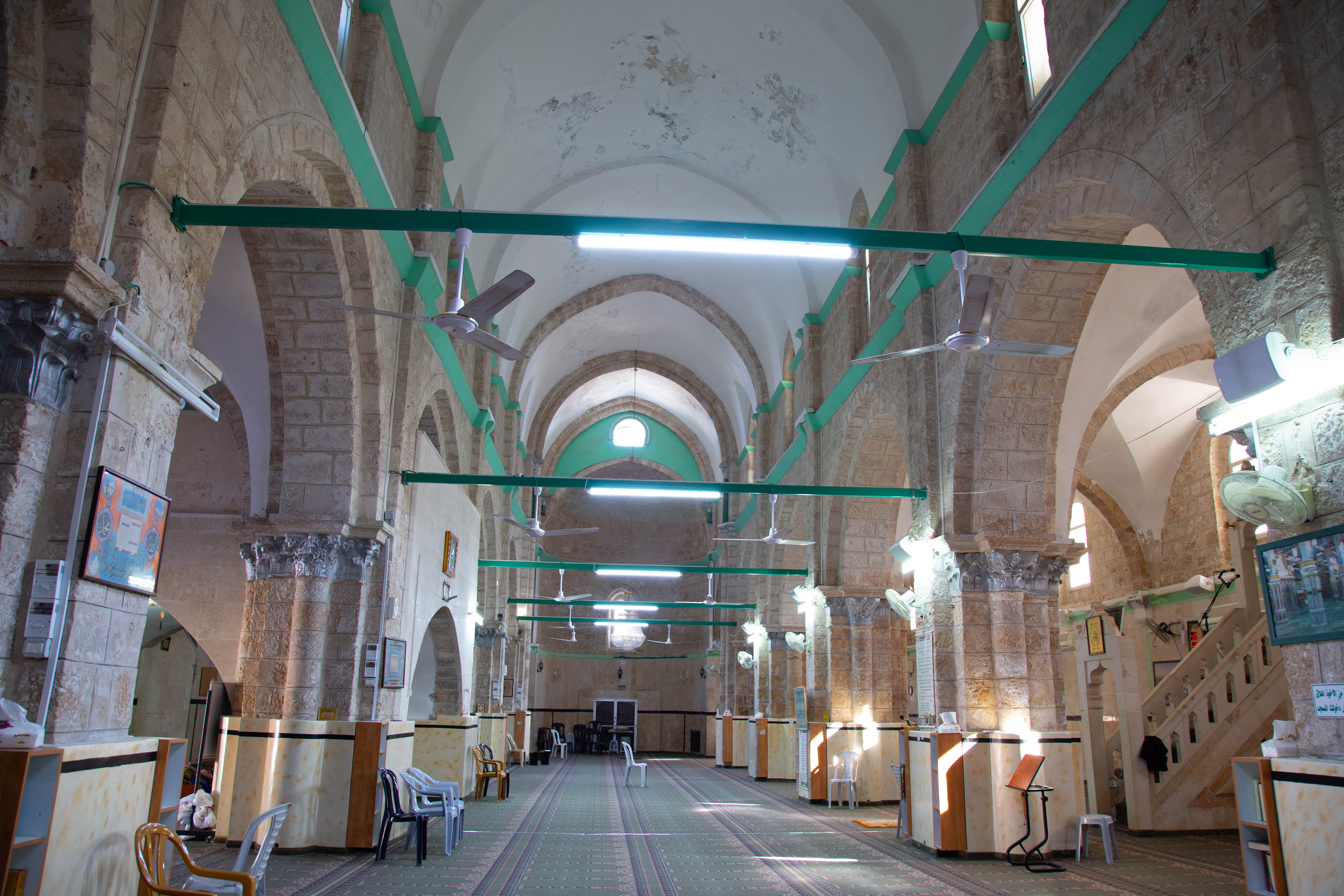
Grand Mosque in the city of Ramla

According to study published by Pew Research Center in 2016, While Muslims living in Israel, overall, are more religious than Israeli Jews, they are less religious than Muslims living in many other countries in the Middle East. For example, about two-thirds of Muslims in Israel (68%) say religion is very important in their lives, which was similar to the number of Lebanese Muslims who agreed with that statement (59%), but lower than the share of Muslims in Jordan (85%), the Palestinian territories (85%) and Iraq (82%) who say this. Israeli Muslims nearly universally say they believe in Allah and his Prophet Muhammad (97%). A majority of Muslims say they pray daily (61%) and roughly half report that they go to a mosque at least once a week (49%). Muslim women are more likely to say that religion has high importance in their lives, and younger Muslims are generally less observant than their elders.

Political affiliation among Israeli Muslims, 2015
| United Arab List | 27% |
| Hadash | 16% |
| Balad | 9% |
| Israeli Labor Party | 7% |
| Meretz | 7% |
| Hatnuah | 5% |
| Likud | 2% |
| Shas | 2% |
| Kadima | 1% |
| Yesh Atid | 1% |
| Yisrael Beytenu | 1% |
| Other party | 1% |
| No party | 20% |

According to study published by Pew Research Center in 2016, 83% of Muslims in Israel fast during Ramadan, which was the lowest among Muslims in any Middle Eastern country. 33% of Muslims believe that Jesus will return during their lifetime, which was similar to the number of Christians who held that belief (33%). When surveyed in 2015, Muslims were most comfortable with their child marrying outside of the faith compared to Jews, Christians, and Druze. The overwhelming majority of Muslims say that (97%) believe strong family relationships is very/somewhat important to them and the majority (68%) say having the opportunity to travel around the world is very/somewhat important. Younger Muslim adults are considerably more likely than older Muslims to say they value world travel. Among Muslims ages 18–49, 73% say having the opportunity to travel the world is very or somewhat important to them, compared with 52% of older Muslims.

According to the Israel Democracy Institute survey conducted in 2015, 47% of Israeli Muslims identified as traditional, 32% identified as religious, 17% identified as not religious at all, 3% identified as very religious.

== Christian–Muslim relations ==
A 2012 survey indicated that Christians in Israel were prosperous and well-educated, but some feared that Muslim intimidation would provoke an exodus to the West. The Christian communities in Nazareth tend to be wealthier and better educated compared to other Arabs elsewhere in Israel, and Christians in Nazareth occupy the majority of the top positions in the town: three hospitals and bank managers, judges and school principals and faculties. The socio-economic gap between the Christians' wealth and Muslims' poverty led sometimes to sectarian crises.

Recently there has been an increase of anti-Christian incidents in the Nazareth area, inspired by the rise of jihadist forces in the Middle East. Many Christians have complained of being targeted by Muslims, whom they believe are trying to either drive them out of cities that have traditionally had large Christian populations, or to "persuade" them to convert. In 1999, for example, radical Muslims in Nazareth rioted as they attempted to wrest land from a major Christian shrine to build a mosque. In one incident during 2014, a flag of the Islamic State of Iraq and the Levant was installed in front of a church in Nazareth.

There has also been increasing incitement and violence by the Muslims against Christians who voice their support for the Israel Defense Forces. In a recent case, the son of Gabriel Naddaf, a prominent Eastern Orthodox priest who is regarded as being pro-Israel, was severely beaten. Naddaf has experienced considerable hostility from Muslims in recent years.

A 2015 study estimated that some 300 Christians were from a Muslim background in Israel.

A 2016 study by Pew research points to the convergence of political views of both Muslims and Christians over issues like– Israel cannot be a Jewish state and a democracy at the same time (Christians: 72%; Muslims: 63%), US being too supportive of Israel (Christians: 86%; Muslims: 75%), Israeli government not making enough efforts to make peace with Palestine (Christians: 80%; Muslims: 72%).

== See also ==
- Baháʼí Faith in Israel
- Christianity in Israel
- Circassians in Israel
- Druze in Israel
- Islam in Palestine
- Israeli Arabs
- Kurds in Israel
- List of Israeli Arab Muslims
- Muslim conquest of the Levant
- Islamization of Jerusalem
- Islamization of the Temple Mount
- Palestinian Christians
- Turks in Israel
- Hinduism in Israel
