= 1969 Greensboro uprising =

Riots in Greensboro, North Carolina

- Part of the Black Power movement
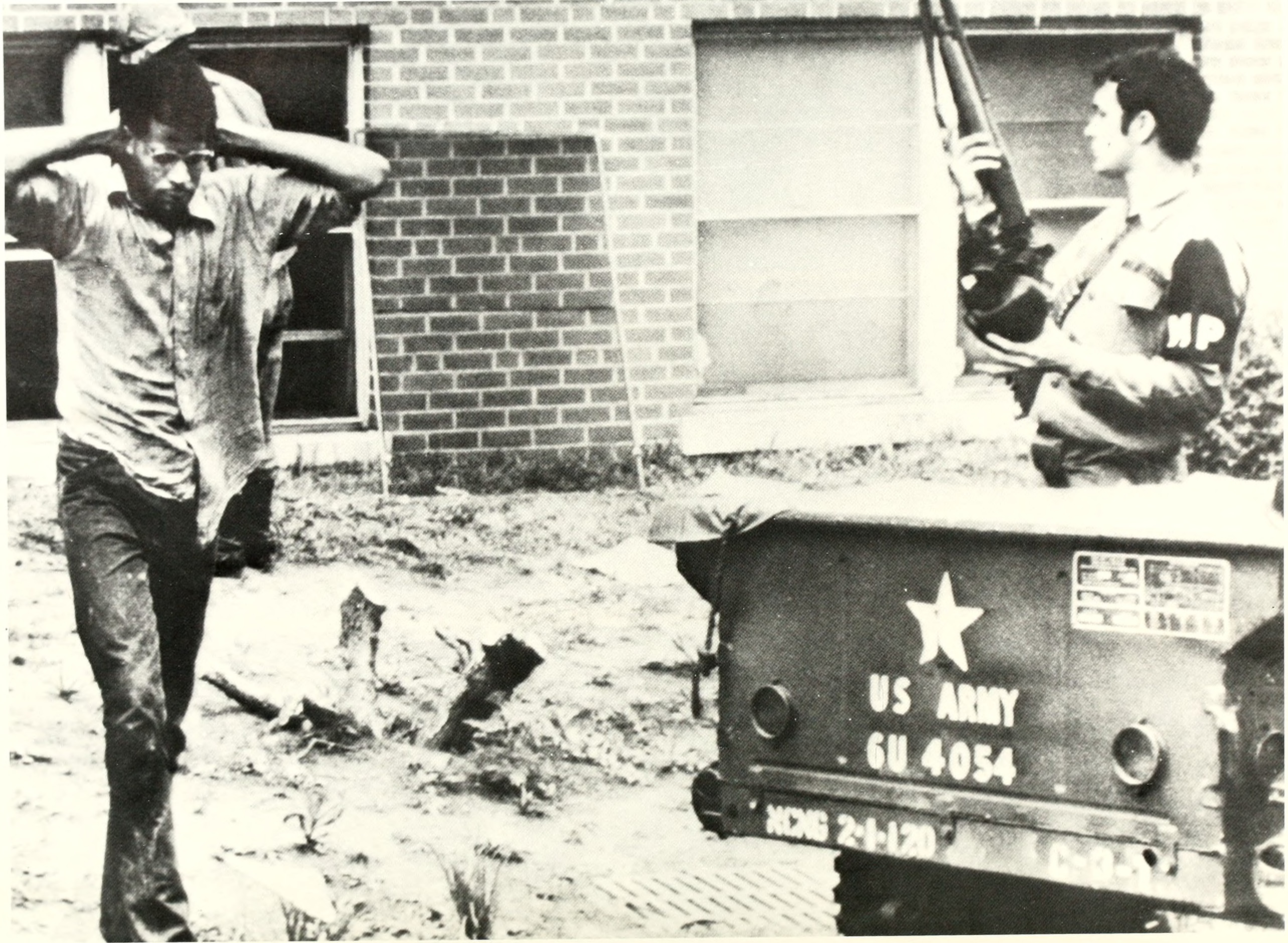
- A&T Student Eddie Evans being taken into protective custody after members of the North Carolina National Guard raid W. Kerr Scott Hall
Date	May 21–25, 1969
Location	Greensboro, North Carolina
Result	Government victory

Belligerents
Activists: Student Organization for Black Unity; Student protesters; Rioting locals	Authorities: North Carolina Army National Guard; Local Police

Casualties and losses
2 dead 18 wounded	9 wounded

The 1969 Greensboro uprising occurred on and around the campuses of James B. Dudley High School and North Carolina Agricultural and Technical State University (A&T) in Greensboro, North Carolina, when, over the course of May 21 to May 25, gunfire was exchanged between student protesters, police and National Guard. One bystander, sophomore honors student Willie Grimes, was killed, although whether he was killed by police or protesters remains unknown.

The uprising was sparked by perceived civil rights issues at the segregated high school, when a popular student council write-in presidential candidate was denied his landslide victory allegedly because school officials feared his activism in the Black Power movement. Starting on the campus of Dudley High School, the uprising spread to A&T campus where students had stood up in support of the Dudley protest. Escalating violence eventually led to armed confrontation and the invasion of the A&T campus by what was described at the time as "the most massive armed assault ever made against an American university". The uprising ended soon after the National Guard made a sweep of A&T college dormitories, taking hundreds of students into protective custody.

While local officials blamed outside agitators, a report released by the North Carolina State Advisory Committee to the United States Commission on Civil Rights found that James B. Dudley High School had an unjust system and suppressed dissent. They found the National Guard invasion reckless and disproportionate to the actual danger, and criticized local community leaders for failing to help the Dudley High School students when the issues first emerged. They declared it "a sad commentary that the only group in the community who would take the Dudley students seriously were the students at A&T State University."

== Events ==
=== James B. Dudley High School ===
Before events began to coalesce in the spring of 1969, the students at James B. Dudley High School were already unhappy. They no longer believed that desegregation of the school system in Greensboro was a possibility. Their school was the only school in the district to place restrictions on student attire or forbid students leaving campus for lunch. But the catalyst for their uprising was their failure to elect a student council president of their choice.

Even though he was not permitted on the ballot, the students attempted to place honor student Claude Barnes in the office of president as a write-in. A senior, Barnes had been politically active in his earlier years at the school, but was feared by school officials, who believed him a militant advocate of Black Power as a member of the Youth for the Unity of Black Society. Barnes won the election with 600 votes, a landslide compared to the top official candidate who received 200. But the student body was informed on May 1 that Barnes would not be permitted to run.

The students of Dudley High turned for assistance to A&T. In the later 1960s, A&T was a center for the Black Power movement in the South. They took the Dudley students seriously. On May 2, A&T students attempted to join discussions with school administrators, but their several attempts proved unsuccessful.

Angry response of the students began to build, with an increasing number of students boycotting classes, and armed police were seen in the vicinity of the school in riot gear. On May 9, the school superintendent effectively disempowered the school's black principal, sending in a white administrator to try to quell the trouble. Students made several attempts during this period to reach a peaceful resolution with school officials, but this administrator did not take a sympathetic or conciliatory approach to the students.

On May 19, events began to reach a head. Police were called to deal with picketing, and, in the midst of alleged police misconduct, nine students were arrested. Student response damaged the school and resulted in more student arrests, as well as student injuries.

On May 21, during school hours, students again assembled near the school. Police were contacted when an official indicated seeing a weapon on one of the students. Efforts by a school administrator to disperse the protesters peaceably failed when some students instead began throwing rocks through the windows of the school. Police brought tear gas against student protesters, applying it over a larger area than may have been needed for the small percentage of students involved in the protest. In some cases—according to residential bystanders—they pursued and gassed students for blocks even as they attempted to flee. Community members, some of whom were also affected by the tear gas canisters, began throwing rocks at police and cars, while students from Dudley High went again to A&T to appeal for assistance.

=== North Carolina A&T State University ===
Early response to the situation at Dudley had been restricted to members of the newly-formed black activism group Student Organization for Black Unity, but the events of the day brought attention from the wider campus. A&T student activist Nelson Johnson reported 400 students marching on Dudley High.

While at first violence was contained to tear gas and rocks, the shooting started shortly thereafter. Johnson claims that the first gunfire was instigated by a carload of young white people who fired onto the A&T campus, prompting the students to defend themselves in kind. Police reported sniper fire from the dormitories at 10:45 p.m. Wherever it started, the police began returning fire within two hours, and 150 National Guard were sent to the scene to keep the peace.

Two students were shot. One of them, bystander Willie Grimes, was killed, although whether he was shot by police or protesters remains unknown. The 22-year-old Grimes had been walking with a group of friends to a restaurant at around 1:30 a.m. when shots came from a passing car. Whether or not the car was a police vehicle has long been the subject of dispute.

Grimes' death ignited the campus. A state of emergency was declared in Greensboro and 500 more National Guardsmen were called in. The university was closed down, and a curfew was set for 8p.m. to 5 a.m. During the day of May 22, violence continued, as protesters vented their anger on white motorists, overturning cars and attacking at least one of the drivers. That evening, in spite of the curfew, shooting resumed

Early in the morning of the 23rd, a shoot-out resulted in the serious injuries of five policemen and two students, which was followed by what was described at the time by one journalist as "the most massive armed assault ever made against an American university", with—according to 2012's The Black Revolution on Campus—the descent upon A&T of 600 National Guardsmen, a tank, a helicopter, an airplane and several armored personnel carriers. A UPI reporter wrote that "it looked like war".

On information suggesting students may be harboring a large number of guns, then-governor Robert W. Scott ordered the invasion of the dormitory Scott Hall, the centerpoint of the shooting. At approximately 7:00 a.m., supported by smoke, "nausea" and tear gas grenades, the National Guard swept through the dorm, placing the students they found under protective custody and doing tens of thousands worth of dollars in damage. Many of the students were packing to evacuate or sleeping at the time of the invasion.

Over 300 students from Scott Hall and neighboring dormitories were sent to state prisons, where they were detained through the day. More than 60 bullet holes left their mark on Scott Hall. Students alleged that during the sweep, personal items disappeared. When the sweep was completed, only three operable firearms had been located.

By the 24th, the violence was contained. The curfew was lifted and the National Guard withdrawn. The uprising was declared over on May 25.

== Aftermath ==
Willie Grimes' funeral was attended by 2,000 people, and a marker was erected on campus in his memory.

Governor Scott stated that the violence had been incited by a group of hard-core militants who had seized on the high school election as a catalyst for furthering their own cause. On October 3 and 4 of that year, meetings were held to investigate the incident under the direction of the North Carolina State Advisory Committee to the United States Commission on Civil Rights. While local officials continued blaming "outsiders" and "radicals" for the event, the committee found that the "prevailing system" at Dudley was unjust and that the school had suppressed dissent.

Criticizing the inaction or ineffective action of school officials and community leaders, they declared it "a sad commentary that the only group in the community who would take the Dudley students seriously were the students at A&T State University." They also condemned the conduct of the National Guard sweep of Scott Hall, which endangered innocent students and seemed out of proportion to the actual risk, writing that "it is difficult to justify the lawlessness and the disorder in which this operation was executed."

In 1979, Jack Elam, Greensboro's mayor during the event, expressed discomfort with the sweep of Scott Hall, but—although he agreed that communication had been poor—declared the committee's report a "joke". Johnson, who had been arrested for inciting the Dudley students to riot and who was instrumental in bringing the committee to review the situation, wrote later that the community ignored the Advisory Committee's report. Additional black policemen were employed by the city, although by 1979 the number of black policemen were still not representative of the proportion of black residents of the area.

2008 saw the release of a documentary recounting the event, Walls that Bleed.
