= Mahmood Mosque, Haifa =

Mosque in Kababir, Haifa, Israel

Mahmood Mosque
- جامع سيدنا محمود
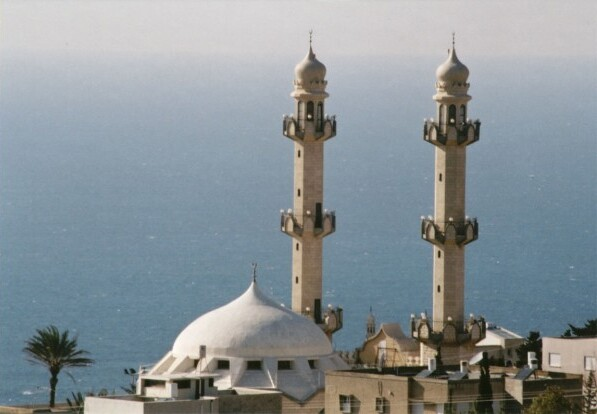
- The mosque in 2008

- Location of the mosque in North Israel

Religion
- Affiliation: Islam
- Branch/tradition: Ahmadiyya
- Ecclesiastical or organizational status: Mosque
- Status: Active

Location
- Location: Kababir, Haifa
- Country: Israel
- Interactive map of Mahmood Mosque
- Coordinates: 32°48′18″N 34°58′12″E

Architecture
- Type: Mosque architecture
- Completed: 1931; 1970s

Specifications
- Dome: One
- Minaret: Two
- Minaret height: 34 m (112 ft)
- Elevation: 178 m (584 ft)

The Mahmood (Note: Also spelled as Mehmood.) Mosque (Arabic: جامع سيدنا محمود; Hebrew: ג'אמע סיידנא מחמוד) is a mosque on Mount Carmel in Kababir, in the Haifa district of Israel. It was built in the early 1930s and expanded by the Ahmadiyya Muslim community in the late 1970s and serves as the community's headquarters in the Middle East. It is known as the first Ahmadi mosque in the Arab world.

== History ==
Mahmood Mosque is known as the first mosque on Mount Carmel, which was built in 1931 by Maulana Shams. It was further expanded in the 1970s and named after the second Khalifa of the Ahmadiyya Muslim Community Mirza Basheer-ud-Din Mahmood Ahmad.

== Architecture ==
The grand mosque has two white minarets standing 35 metres (115 ft), which dominate the low-rise skyline of the residential neighbourhoods on the ridges nearby. Construction of the mosque was funded by members of the local Ahmadiyya community.

== Gallery ==
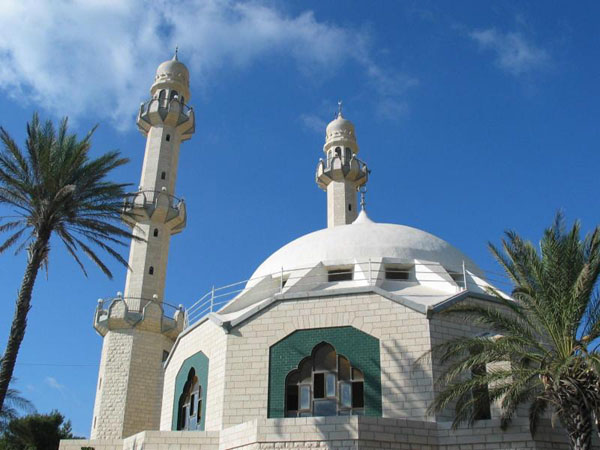
Ahmadi Mosque

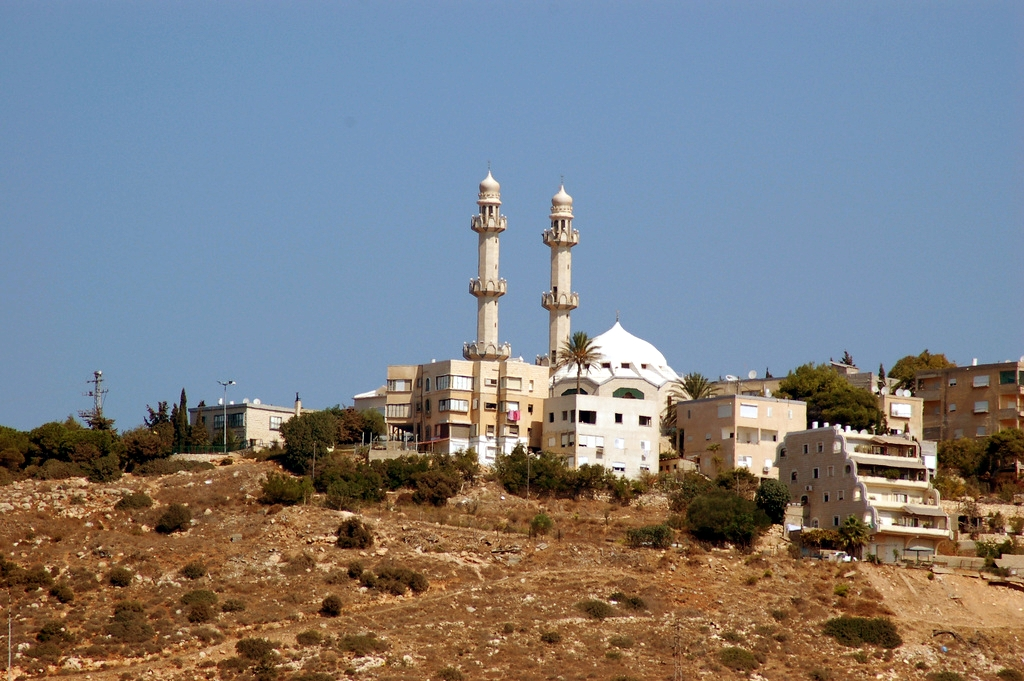
View of mosque from afar

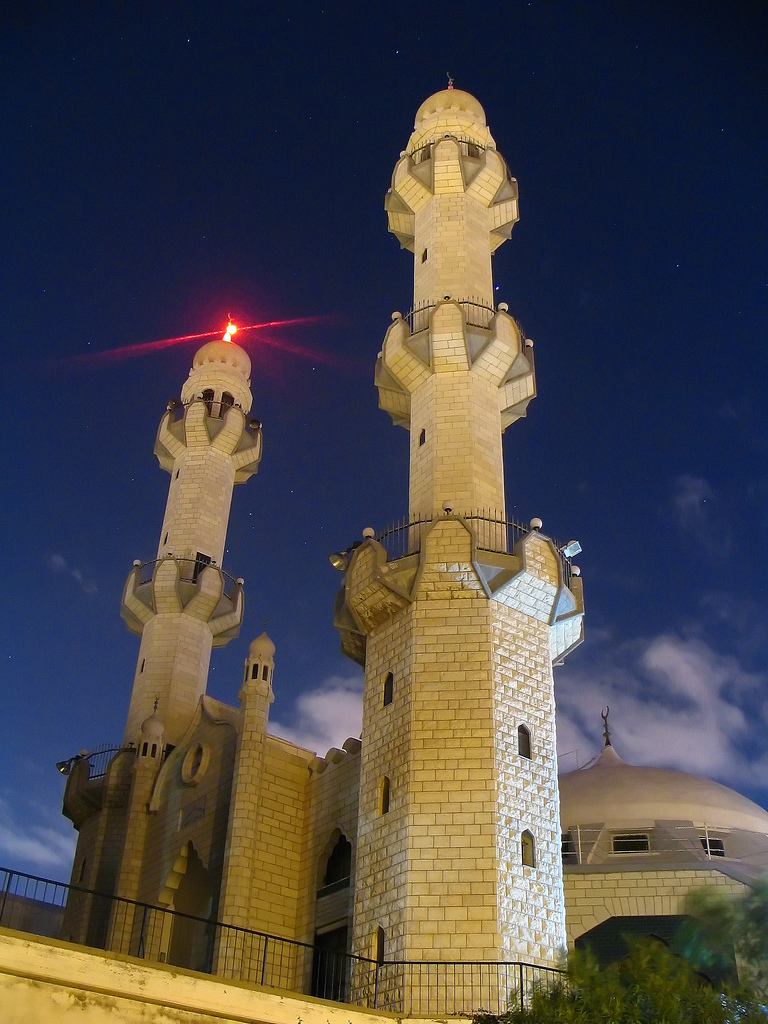
View of the minarets

== See also ==
- Ahmadiyya in Israel
- List of mosques in Israel
- List of Ahmadiyya buildings and structures
- Islam in Israel
