= Malodorant =

Chemical compound whose extreme stench acts as a temporary incapacitant

A malodorant is a chemical compound whose extreme stench acts as a temporary incapacitant. It attacks the olfactory and/or trigeminal nerves of the person introduced to the chemical. These compounds are usually composed of at least two ingredients: the malodorant compound and a carrier liquid. Malodorant compositions have a toxicity category rating of III or higher.

== Compounds used as malodorants ==
- Organosulfur compounds
- Skatole, an odor intensifier

== Common responses to malodorant ==
- Immediate nausea
- Gagging/vomiting
- Various levels of discomfort

== Weapon examples ==
- Dippel's oil
- Skunk (weapon)
- Who, Me?

== See also ==
- Stink bomb
