= Skunk (weapon) =

Malodorant, non-lethal weapon used for crowd control

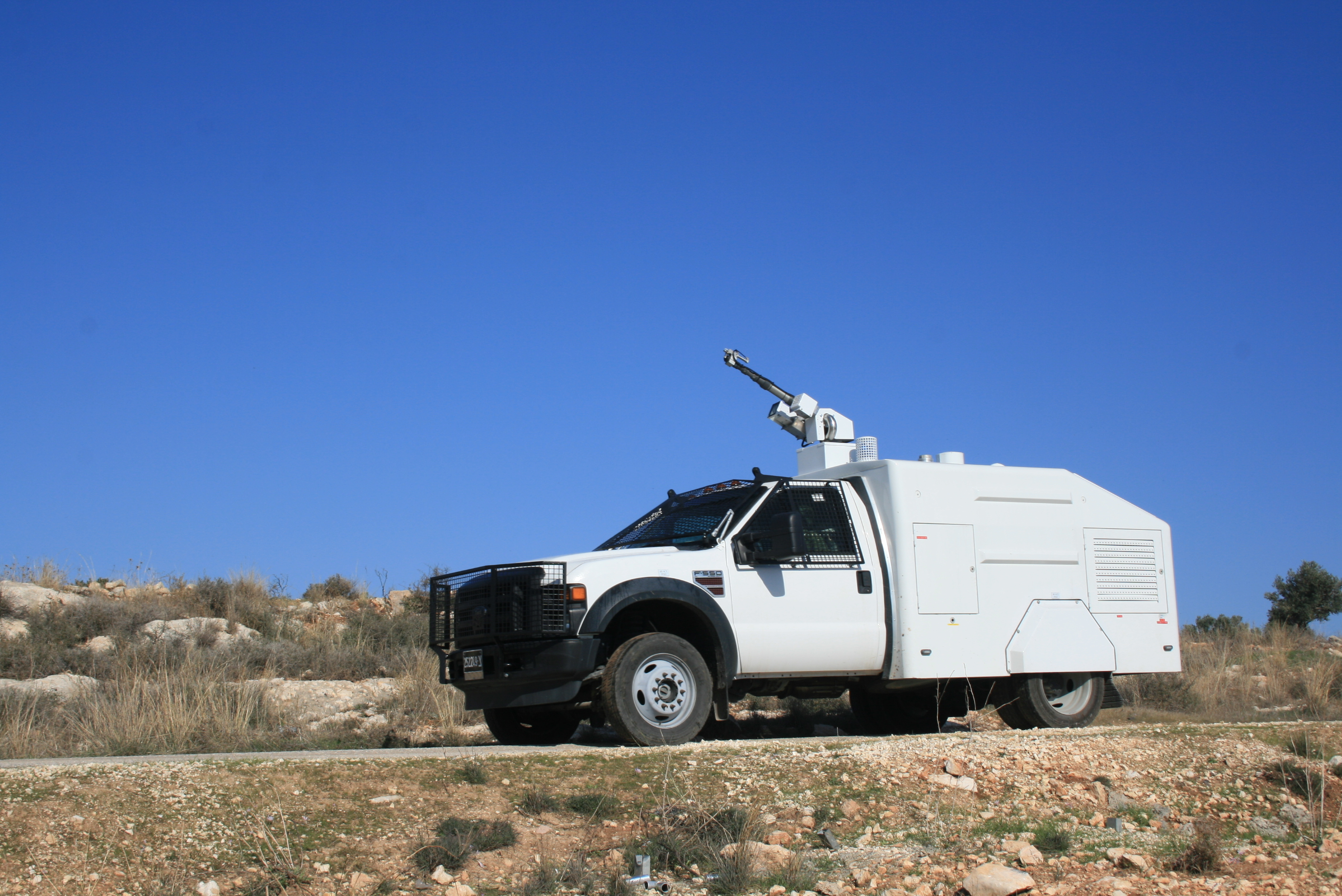
Skunk carrying vehicle, Palestinian village of Bil'in, in the occupied West Bank

Skunk is a malodorant, non-lethal weapon used for crowd control by the Israel Defense Forces (IDF) and marketed to militaries and law enforcement around the world. It was developed and is manufactured by Odortec, with two supporting companies, Man and Beit-Alfa Technologies. The liquid's strong odor is marketed as an improvement over other crowd control weapons (CCWs) such as rubber bullets and tear gas used by the IDF against Palestinian protestors. The IDF has been criticized for its tactics during deployment, including common use against people, businesses, and neighborhoods not involved in protests as a form of collective punishment.

== Product ==
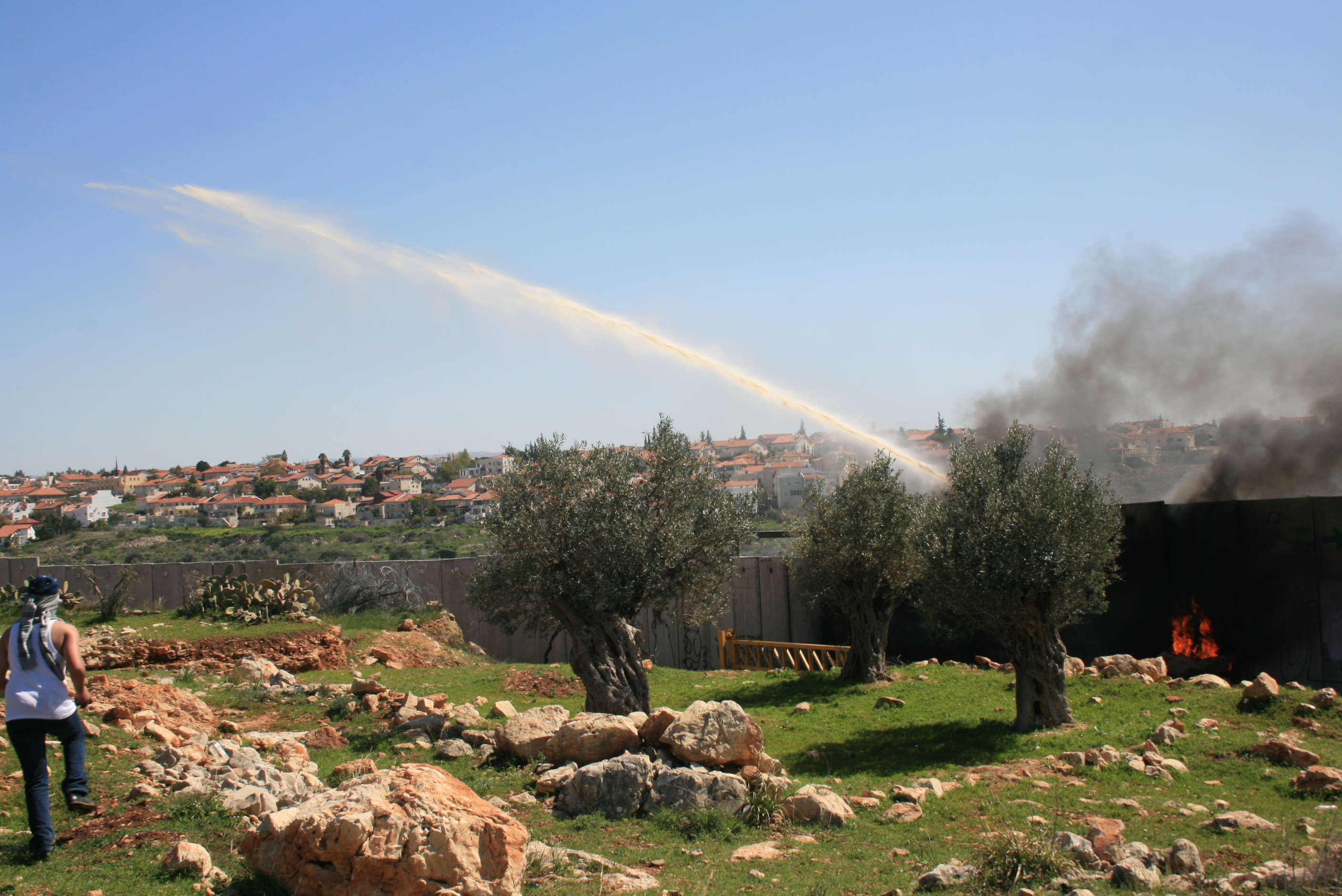
Deployment in Ni'lin during a Palestinian demonstration against the Israeli separation wall in 2012

The material used is said to be an organic and non-toxic blend of baking powder, yeast, and other ingredients. Deriving its name from the animal of the same name which is known for its ability to spray a foul-smelling fluid, "Skunk" is dispersed as a form of yellow mist, fired from a water cannon, which leaves a powerful odor similar to rot or sewage on whatever it touches. Skunk is also sold in handheld canisters and in grenades which can be thrown or fired as projectiles (see riot gun). The company later marketed Skunk to law enforcement agencies worldwide, specifically American local police departments. Several US police departments, including the St. Louis Metropolitan Police Department, purchased it. A BBC reporter describes its effects as follows:

Imagine the worst, most foul thing you have ever smelled. An overpowering mix of rotting meat, old socks that haven’t been washed for weeks – topped off with the pungent waft of an open sewer. . .Imagine being covered in the stuff as it is liberally sprayed from a water cannon. Then imagine not being able to get rid of the stench for at least three days, no matter how often you try to scrub yourself clean.

A reporter for Reuters described its effect in the following words:

Imagine taking a chunk of rotting corpse from a stagnant sewer, placing it in a blender and spraying the filthy liquid in your face. Your gag reflex goes off the charts and you can't escape, because the nauseating stench persists for days.

However, when tested in India, the product failed miserably:

We used it on a captive crowd consisting of CRPF personnel and general public. But they managed to tolerate the smell without much difficulty. [...] Those who can ignore [the] smell can drink the liquid also.

In December 2017, Haaretz reported:

Skunk is liable to cause physical harm, such as intense nausea, vomiting and skin rashes, in addition to any injury resulting from the powerful force of the spray. Examinations by police and army medical teams in the past also indicated that the excessive coughing caused by exposure can result in suffocation.

Some report that the smell is so potent it can linger on clothes for months, if not years.

== Removal ==
The company sells a special soap – available to authorities but not the general public – that neutralises the smell of skunk water if officers are accidentally sprayed. It has been suggested that rubbing a surface contaminated with skunk with ketchup, similar to treating a real skunk spray with tomato juice, and then washing it off, may diminish perception of the odor (due to the effects of olfactory fatigue). In 1993, American chemist Paul Krebaum developed a compound that chemically neutralizes natural skunk spray by changing the odor-causing thiols into odorless acids. This compound can be prepared as a mixture of: 1 quart of 3% hydrogen peroxide, ¼ cup of baking soda, and 1-2 teaspoons of liquid dish soap.

== History ==
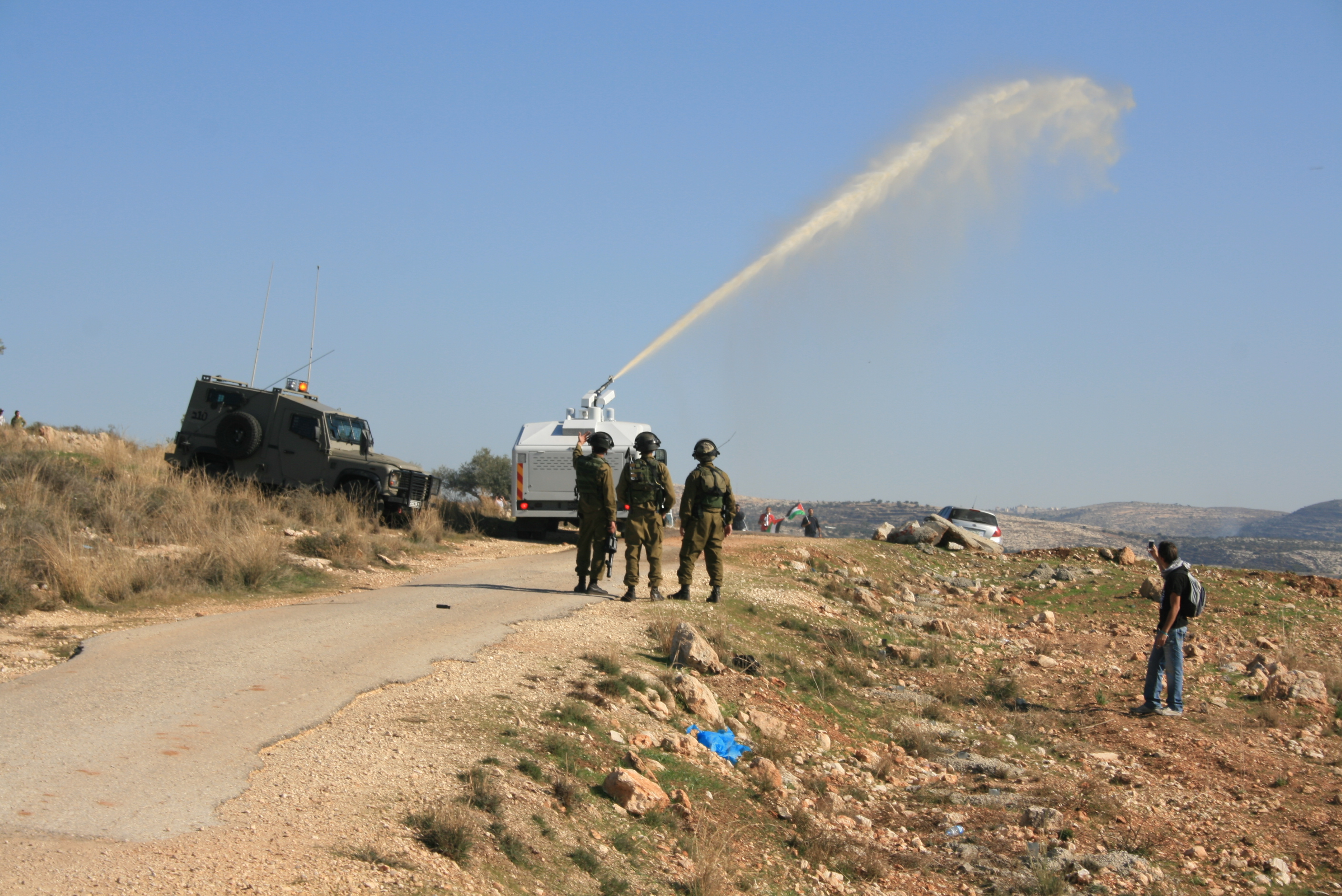
IDF spraying Skunk on Palestinian demonstrators in Bil'in, West Bank, December 2011

The first attempts at developing an odor-based form of crowd control began in Israel in 2004 by Rafael. The IDF reconsidered at the time a change in its open fire procedures, and adopting other crowd dispersal methods after an Israeli demonstrator, Gil Na'amati (21), was shot during a protest over the separation barrier, near the West Bank village of Mas-ha in late 2003. It reportedly does not wash off easily and may linger on clothes for up to five years. The development of Skunk followed numerous accusations against Israeli forces that they often employ disproportionate force in clashes with Palestinian protesters (e.g. using rubber bullets or tear gas), which has led them to seek new, non-lethal but effective methods of crowd control.

Skunk was first reported to be used for crowd control in August 2008 in the Palestinian village of Ni'lin where daily protests had been taking place in response to the construction of a security barrier. Spraying the liquid has developed into one of the preferred measures adopted by the IDF to meet the challenge of civil disobedience and demonstrations by Palestinians. The tactic was devised to tamp down organized civilian protests in the West Bank. It has been used regularly against the villagers of Bil'in, Ni'lin, Kafr Qaddum, and Nabi Salih, where weekly protests against the occupation are practiced.

In Hebron it was used on the 26 February 2012 to disperse a crowd of an estimated 1,000 people which clashed with Israeli soldiers during a protest described as commemorating the anniversary of the Cave of the Patriarchs Massacre or as pressing for the reopening of the zone of Shuhada Street. A funeral procession waiting for the riots to be dispersed were also doused with the liquid. It has been used during clashes with "Palestinian protesters calling for the release of Palestinian hunger striker Mohammad Allan near Barzilai Medical Center" in the Israeli city of Ashkelon.

In 2017, Israeli forces began using Skunk against ultra-Orthodox Jewish protesters.

In January 2024, students at a pro-Palestine demonstration at Columbia University were allegedly attacked with Skunk by individuals disguised as fellow protesters. One victim, who claimed that Palestinian friends recognized the odor as Skunk, described it as having the smell of "poop mixed with decaying animal." Victims of the attack reported difficulty removing the odor from their clothes and other possessions, and that the effects of the spray including its odor, skin irritation, nausea, and dizziness continue days after the attack despite efforts to remove it. The incident is currently being investigated by the New York City Police Department as a potential hate crime.

== Response ==
Among Palestinians, the liquid is known simply as "shit". Amnesty International, B'Tselem, and the Association for Civil Rights in Israel have been critical of the IDF's use of the product. Concerns have included accusations of indiscriminate use against people, homes, and businesses not involved in demonstrations. The IDF has also been accused of deployment in a manner described as punitive. The IDF has at times sprayed Palestinian houses after protests as a form of collective punishment. In response to a negative B'tselem report, the Israel Defense Forces stated that "Skunk" is used only when demonstrators become violent or engage in vandalism and has specific rules of engagement for its use.

Skunk was criticized in a joint 2016 Physicians for Human Rights (PHR) and International Network of Civil Liberties Organizations (INCLO) report on crowd control weapons published by the American Civil Liberties Union (ACLU).

== Foreign sales ==
CRPF in India had tested skunk for possible usage in crowd control situations in India but the tests failed to meet the required standards. Testing the product on crowd consisting of police personnel and general public reportedly failed to convince the local police crowd control units on its effectiveness. The test subjects were found to have tolerated the smell. According to an official associated with the test, Indians possibly had higher threshold to tolerate the stench.

== See also ==
- Stink bomb
- Riot control
