= Kababir =

Neighbourhood of Haifa, Israel

Coordinates: 32°48′N 34°58′E

Kababir الكبابير
- Neighborhood
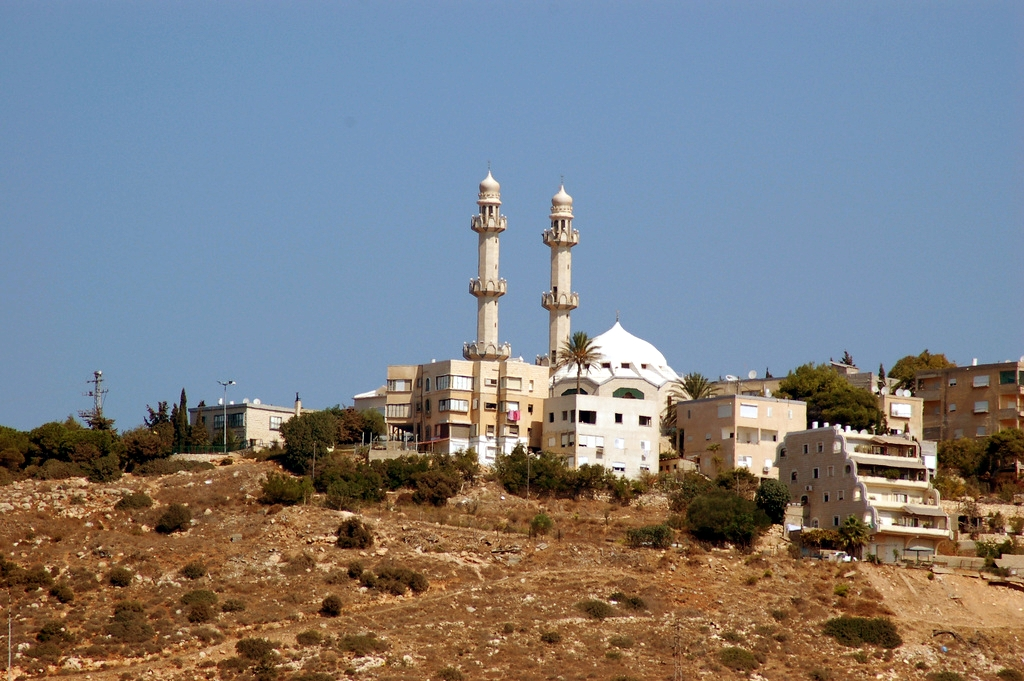
- View of Kababir
- Interactive map of Kababir
- Country: Israel
- District: Haifa District
- City: Haifa

Kababir (Arabic: الكبابير; Hebrew: כבביר) is an Arab neighbourhood in the city of Haifa, Israel with a majority of Ahmadi Muslims, and a minority of Jews. It is known as the centre of the Ahmadiyya Muslim Community in the Middle East. Kababir lies on Mount Carmel and takes roots in Palestine when it was known as a commune which became a permanent village near the depopulated town of Al-Tira, Haifa.

== History ==
=== Ottomon Empire ===
Displaced residents of Kababir are originally from the village of Ni'lin near Jerusalem. In 1934, the village became separated from Al-Tira and was represented by its own Mukhtar.

== Demographics ==
The Shambor family is one of the biggest in neighborhood. The Odeh's family has a longstanding history with the neighbourhood when it was managed as a commune, in which every working male contributed a fee to a mutual account. Some of the men joined the Turkish army, while some worked in the oil refinery in the city of Haifa. Others worked building the Port of Haifa.

== Landmarks ==
Kababir is known for having the first mosque built on Mount Carmel in 1931, which was further expaned into a grand mosque in the 1980s. The mosque was built by the Ahmadiyya Muslim Community is named after the second caliph Mirza Basheer-ud-Din Mahmood Ahmad.

== See also ==
- Ahmadiyya in Israel
- Mahmood Mosque (Kababir)
