= Ahmadiyya in Israel =

Islamic movement

The Ahmadiyya in Israel (Hebrew: אחמדים בישראל; Arabic: الجماعة الإسلامية الأحمدية في الديار المقدسة, lit. 'Islamic Ahmadiyya Community in the Holy Land') is a small community established in the region in the 1920s in what was then the British Mandate of Palestine. Israel is the only country in the Middle East where the Ahmadi branch of Islam can be openly practiced. As such, Kababir, a neighbourhood on Mount Carmel in Haifa, Israel, acts as the Middle East headquarters of the community. It is unknown how many Israeli Ahmadis there are, but there are an estimated 2,200 Ahmadis in Kababir alone.

== History ==
The history of the Ahmadiyya community in Israel begins with a tour of the Middle East in 1924 made by the second caliph of the movement, Mirza Basheer-ud-Din Mahmood Ahmad, and a number of missionaries. However, the community was first established in the region in 1928, in what was then the British Mandate of Palestine. The first converts to the movement belonged to the Odeh tribe on Mount Carmel, which originated from Ni'lin, a small village near Jerusalem. In the 1950s, they settled in Kababir, formerly a village which was later absorbed by the city of Haifa. As of 2015, 70% of the Kababir Ahmadis were members of the Oudeh family. The neighbourhood's first mosque was built in 1931, and the larger Mahmood Mosque in the 1980s.

In 1987, the Israeli Ahmadiyya community translated the Quran into Yiddish, a language among the 100 languages chosen by the then-caliph of the worldwide community, Mirza Tahir Ahmad.

== Current community ==
The Ahmadiyya community is present in most districts of Israel, but is generally concentrated in Israel's third largest city, Haifa.

=== Haifa ===
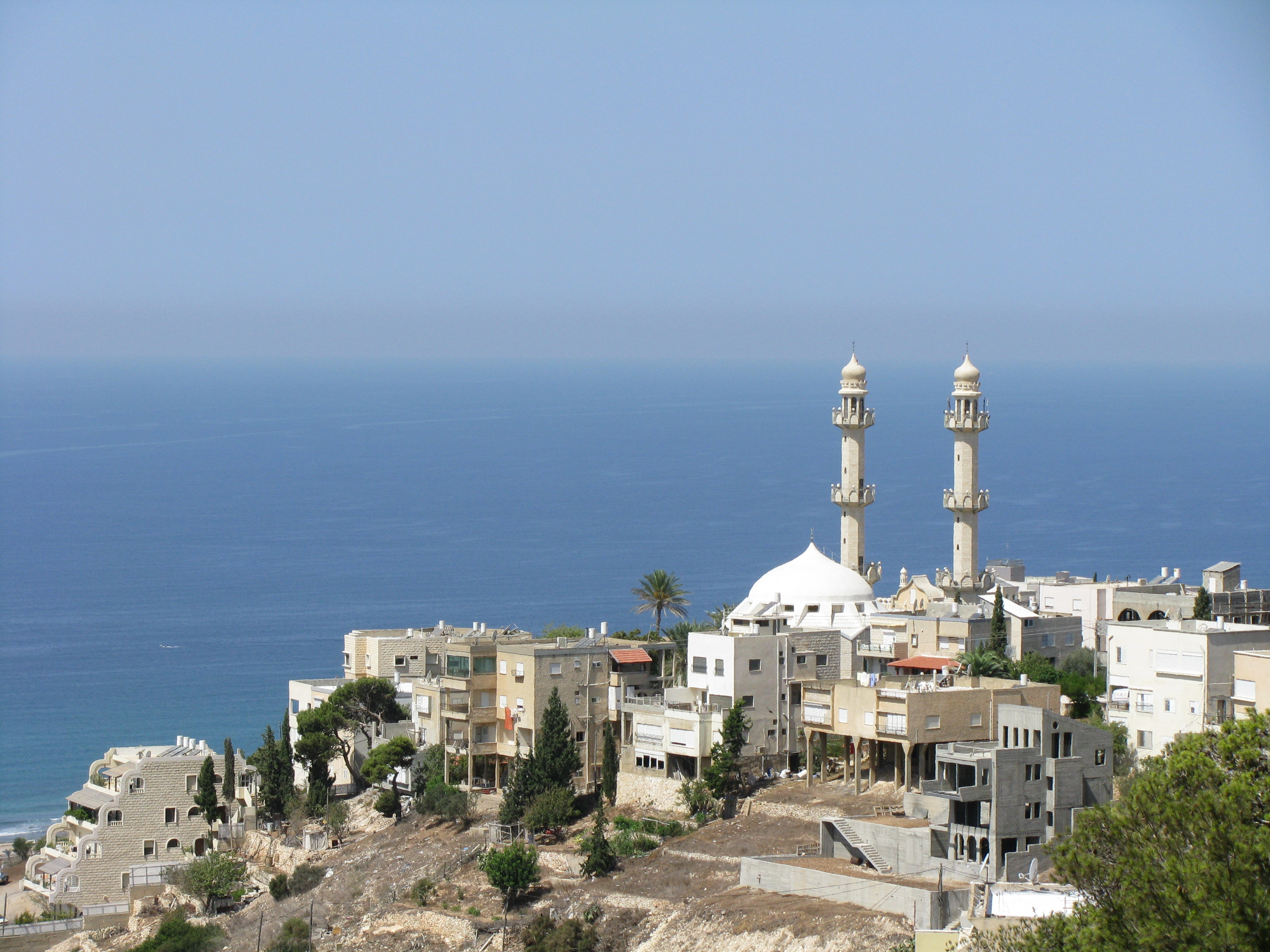
Part of Kababir's neighbourhood in Haifa, with Mahmood Mosque in the background

Although there are Ahmadis in other parts of Israel, the neighbourhood of Kababir in Haifa is the only established community in the country. Kababir is a mixed neighbourhood, with an Ahmadiyya majority, a significant minority of Jews, some Christians and a few Druze. The community includes a small number of Palestinian converts to Ahmadiyya Islam, who sought shelter in Haifa after they were excommunicated by their larger families in the West Bank. Haifa city officials view it as a model of coexistence. Yona Yahav, a past mayor of Haifa, has described the local Ahmadis as "Reform Arabs" (in analogy with Reform Jews). Multiple politicians have visited the local community, including the then-president of Israel, Shimon Peres, on invitation for an Iftar dinner during the month of Ramadhan.

The local Ahmadi community is an active contributor in the life of the city, such as participation in interfaith activities, for instance in the Haifa Forum for Interfaith Cooperation. Ahmadi Muslims organize an annual neighbours day to in order to promote good relations with its neighbours and to introduce the Ahmadiyya Community. The community also plays a significant role in the Holiday of Holidays, a local festival attended by tens of thousands of people. Ahmadi leaders and members participate in all the symbolic and official ceremonies and gatherings, together with other religious and political leaders with whom they maintain serene and active relations. Ayman Odeh, a prominent Israeli politician, grew up in Kababir as a member of an Ahmadiyya family.

In 2009, as part of the official delegation of Israeli religious leaders, the president of the Ahmadiyya Muslim community of Israel met Pope Benedict XVI, to deliver a direct message composed by the fifth Caliph of the worldwide community, Mirza Masroor Ahmad. At this occasion, the pope was also given a copy of the Quran. In 2011, the local Ahmadi community hosted a tour of the city and the local mosque for the 27th annual International Mayors Conference, an event sponsored by the American Council for World Jewry in cooperation with the Israeli Ministry of Foreign Affairs.

As the regional headquarters of the community, in the only country in the Middle East that permits Ahmadi Muslims to practice their faith freely, the Haifa community hosts an annual conference for Ahmadi religious leaders from various parts of the world, particularly Middle Eastern countries, such as Jordan, Egypt and Palestine. The Haifa community is also a host to a number of television programmes for its Arabic viewers in the Middle East and North Africa, through its Arabic television channel MTA 3, which is part of the MTA International global television network.

=== Rest of Israel ===
Ahmadis have a presence in the Northern District, Central, Jerusalem and Southern Districts of Israel. However, there is no established community in any of these regions.

== See also ==
- Islam in Israel
