= Ni'lin =

Palestinian town in Ramallah and al-Bireh Governorate, West Bank

- Municipality type C

Arabic transcription(s)
  - Arabic: نعلين
  - Latin: Ni'lin, Na'alin (official)
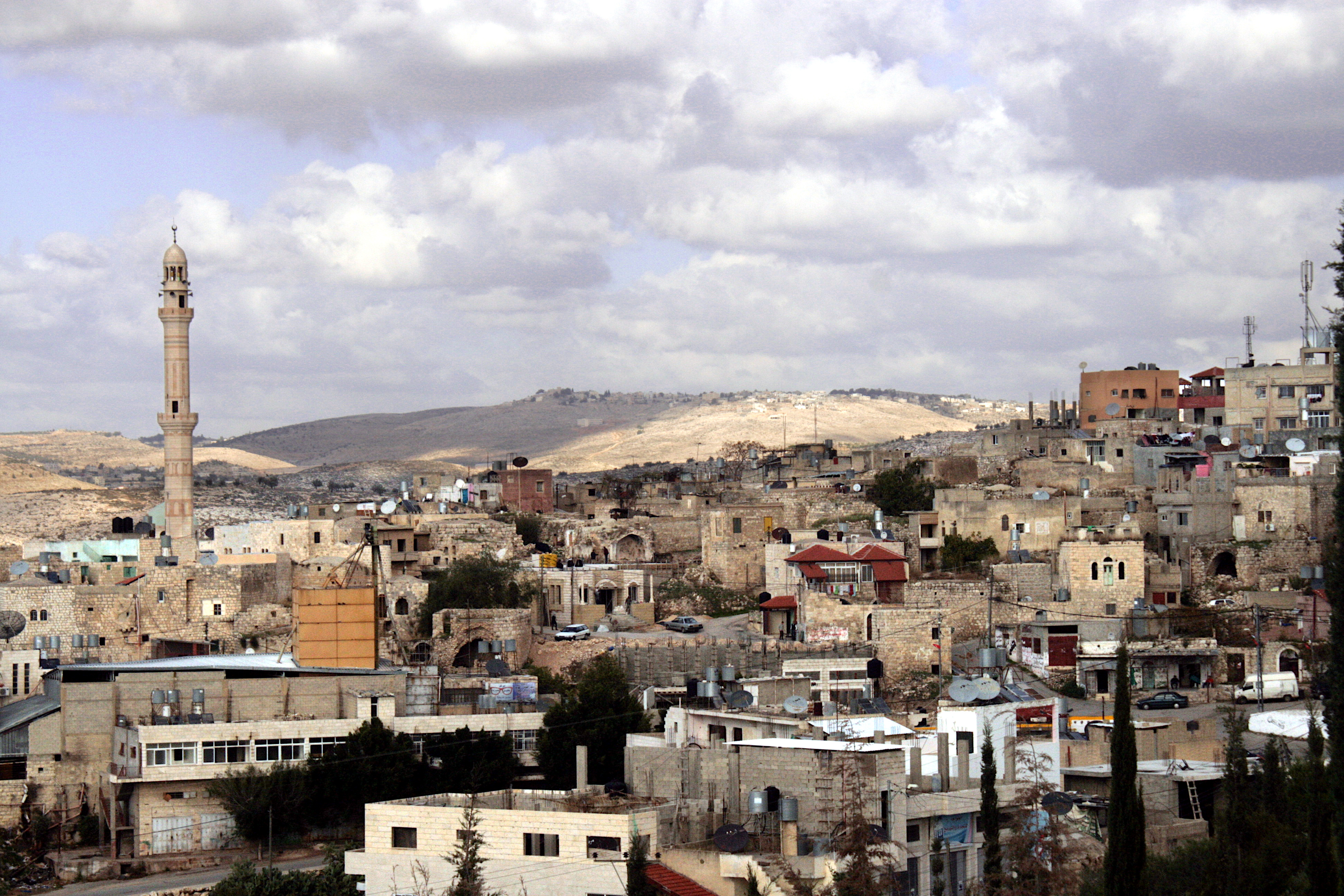

- Location of Ni'lin within Palestine
- Coordinates: 31°56′48″N 35°01′18″E
- Palestine grid: 152/150
- State: State of Palestine
- Governorate: Ramallah and al-Bireh

Government
  - Type: Municipality
  - Head of Municipality: Ayman Nafie

Area
  - Total: 14.8 km^{2} (5.7 sq mi)

Population (2017)
  - Total: 5,118
  - Density: 346/km^{2} (896/sq mi)
- Name meaning: N'alin, from na'l, a sandal

Ni'lin (Arabic: نعلين) is a Palestinian town in the Ramallah and al-Bireh Governorate of the State of Palestine, in the central West Bank, located 17 kilometers (11 mi) west of Ramallah. Ni'lin is about 3 kilometers (1.9 mi) east of the 1949 Armistice Line (Green Line) bordered by Deir Qaddis, the Israeli settlements of Nili and Na'ale to the northeast, the village of al-Midya and Modi'in Illit (Kiryat Sefer) settlement bloc are to the south, Budrus (4 km) and Qibya (5 km) villages are located to the northwest. The town's total land area consists of approximately 15,000 dunams of which 660 is urban. Under the Oslo II agreement, 93% of town lands has been classed as 'Area C'.

Most of the town's inhabitants rely on agriculture for income and prior to the outbreak of the Second Intifada, many had jobs in construction in Israel. According to the Palestinian Central Bureau of Statistics, the town had a population of 5,118 inhabitants in 2017.

Situated 262 meters (860 feet) above sea level, Ni'lin has mild winters and hot, dry summers with temperatures averaging 32 °C (88 °F) during the day.

== Etymology ==
The name Niʽlīn likely derives from Niḥlin. This phonological shift was influenced by the settlement of Samaritans in the area during the late Roman to early Byzantine periods.

== History ==
Potsherds have been found dating back to the late Iron Age (8th–7th century B.C.E.), and the Hellenistic, Byzantine, Crusader/Ayyubid, Mamluk, and early Ottoman periods.

A person named Isaac de Naelein is mentioned in a Crusader text of the year 1167 in connection to nearby Casale St. Maria (Aboud).

=== Ottoman period ===
In 1517, Ni'lin was incorporated into the Ottoman Empire with the rest of Palestine.

In 1552, Ni'lin was mentioned as an inhabited village. Haseki Hürrem Sultan, the favourite wife of Suleiman the Magnificent, endowed 18 carats of its the tax revenues to her charitable foundation, the Haseki Sultan Imaret in Jerusalem. Administratively, the village belonged to the sub-district of Ramla in the district of Gaza. In 1596 it appeared in the tax registers as being in the nahiya of Ramla of the liwa of Gaza. It had a population of 72 households, all Muslims. The villagers paid a fixed tax rate of 25% on agricultural products, including wheat, barley, summer crops, olive trees, fruit trees, goats, and/or beehives, and a press for olives or grapes, in addition to occasional revenues; a total of 3,500 akçe. All of the revenue went to a waqf.

In 1838, it was noted as a Muslim village called Na'lin in the Ibn Humar area in the district of Er-Ramleh.

An Ottoman village list from 1870 showed that Ni'lin had 156 houses and a population of 493, though the population count included only men. It was described as bordering Deir Qaddis.

In 1882, the PEF's Survey of Western Palestine described N'alin as a "large village on high ground, surrounded by olives, and supplied by cisterns."

In the beginning of the 20th century, residents from Ni'lin resettled in Deir Abu Salameh and Khirbat al-Duhayriyya in the hills west of the village, establishing satellite villages.

On 28 December 1917, during World War I, the village was captured by the British from Ottoman forces. The British held the line from here eastwards to Beitin and westwards to the coast, north of Jaffa.

=== British Mandate ===
In the 1922 census of Palestine, conducted by the British Mandate authorities, the village, called Na'lin, had a population of 1,160, all Muslims. The 1931 census of Palestine gives the population as 1249 (one Christian and the rest Muslim), living in 299 houses.

In the 1945 statistics the population of Ni'lin was 1,420, all Muslims, who owned 15,875 dunams of land according to an official land and population survey. Of this, 5,921 dunams were plantations and irrigable land, 3,053 dunams were used for cereals, while 29 dunams were built-up (urban) land.

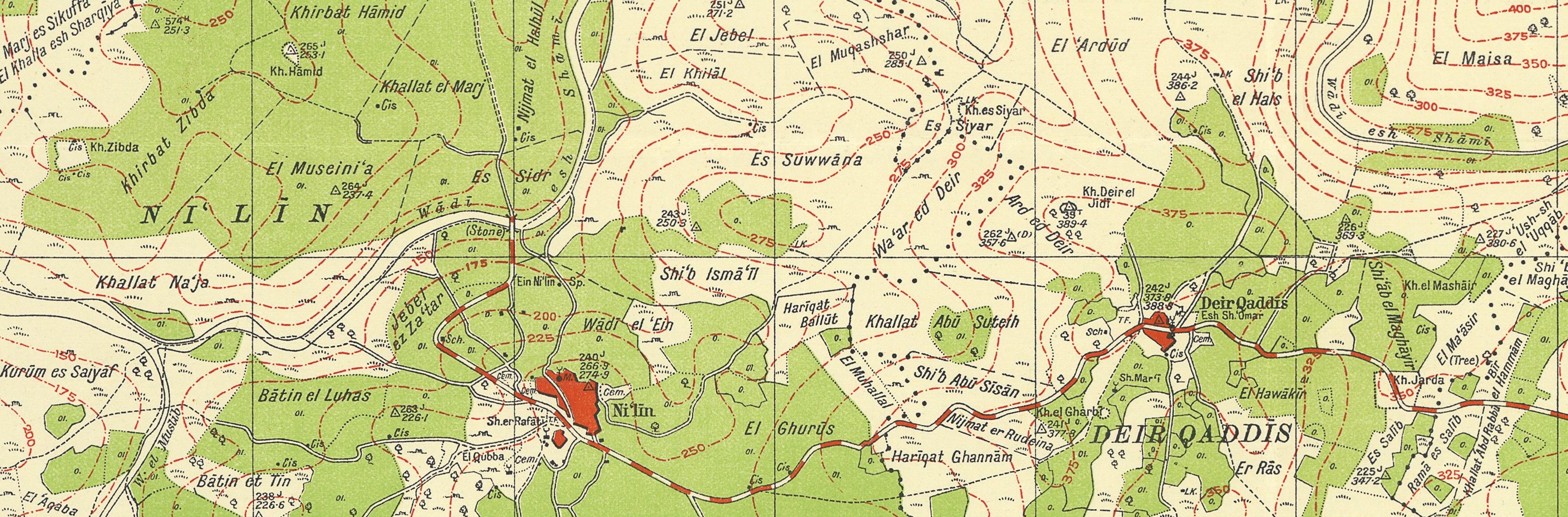
Ni'lin 1944 1:20,000

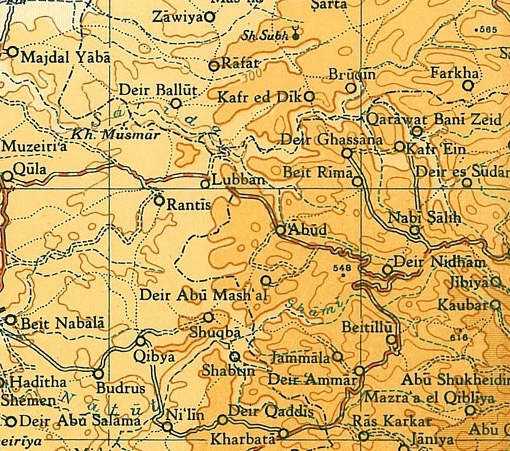
Ni'lin 1945 1:250,000

=== Jordanian period ===
In the wake of the 1948 Arab–Israeli War, and after the 1949 Armistice Agreements, Ni'lin came under Jordanian rule. It was annexed by Jordan in 1950.

In 1961, the population of Ni'lin was 2,055.

=== Post 1967 ===
After the Six-Day War in 1967, Ni'lin came under Israeli military occupation.

Since the 1995 accords, 93% of town lands has been classed as Area C, and the remaining 7% as Area B.

According to the Applied Research Institute in Jerusalem (ARIJ), Israel has confiscated Ni'lin land for the construction of three Israeli settlements: 945 dunams seized for Hashmona'im, 645 dunams for Mattityahu, and 384 dunams for Modi'in Illit.

On 22 March 2020, Sufyan Nawwaf al-Khawaja (age 32) from Ni'lin was killed after being shot in the head by the Israeli army. The Israelis said he was throwing stones, while his family said he was buying supplies before the shut-down imposed due to the coronavirus pandemic.

== Barrier protests ==
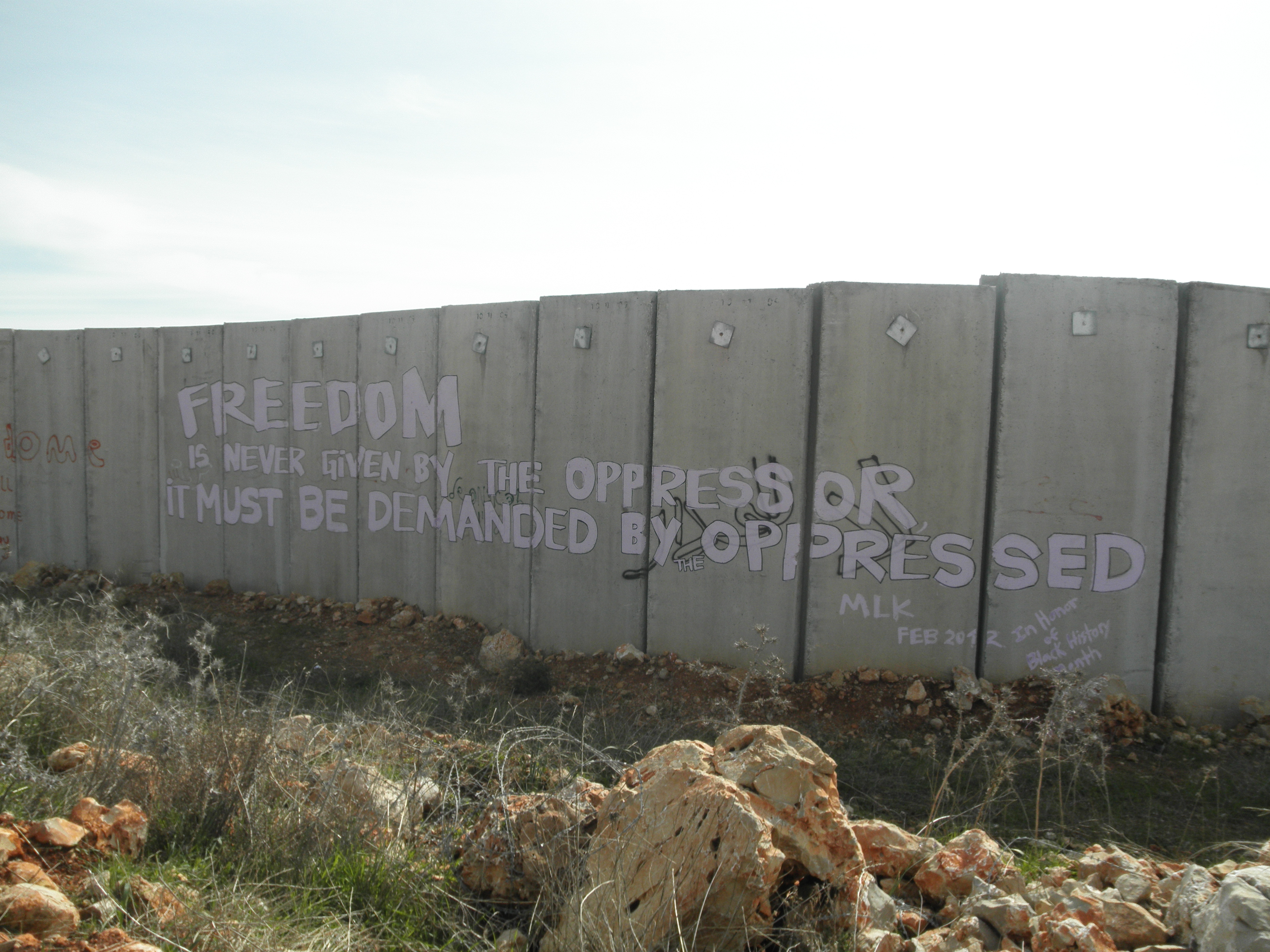
Paraphrased text from Martin Luther King Jr.'s 1963 Letter from Birmingham Jail, written on the separation wall in Ni'lin during Black History Month 2012

During 2008 and 2009, the residents of Ni'lin and international activists staged weekly demonstrations against a nearby expansion of the Israeli West Bank barrier. It has been estimated that the completion of the barrier will remove one third of Ni'lin's land.

The first of escalating incidents at the anti-barrier protest demonstrations led to the fatal shooting of 10-year-old Ahmed Moussa on 29 July 2008. The incident occurred when a group of mostly teenage boys had gone to the barrier construction site outside Ni'ilin, where there were no security personnel, the boys began removing razor wire. A preliminary Israeli police probe has found that Israeli border policemen used live ammunition to disperse the group and that one of the bullets likely killed Ahmed Moussa. During the demonstration, 15 others were injured by rubber coated steel bullets. The funeral of Ahmed Moussa was marred by a distinct up-swing in violence. The permanent stationing of a Border Police force, ordered by OC Central Command Maj.-Gen. Gadi Shamni, on the outskirts of the village where the daily demonstrations are held, infuriated marchers in the funeral procession. Yousef Ahmed Younis Amera (18) was declared brain-dead in a Ramallah hospital on Wednesday 30 July 2008 after being shot in the head with a rubber-coated steel bullet and finally died on Monday 4 August 2008. On 5 August 2008, Israeli police said that they had detained a border policeman and placed him under house arrest in connection with the death of Ahmed Moussa.

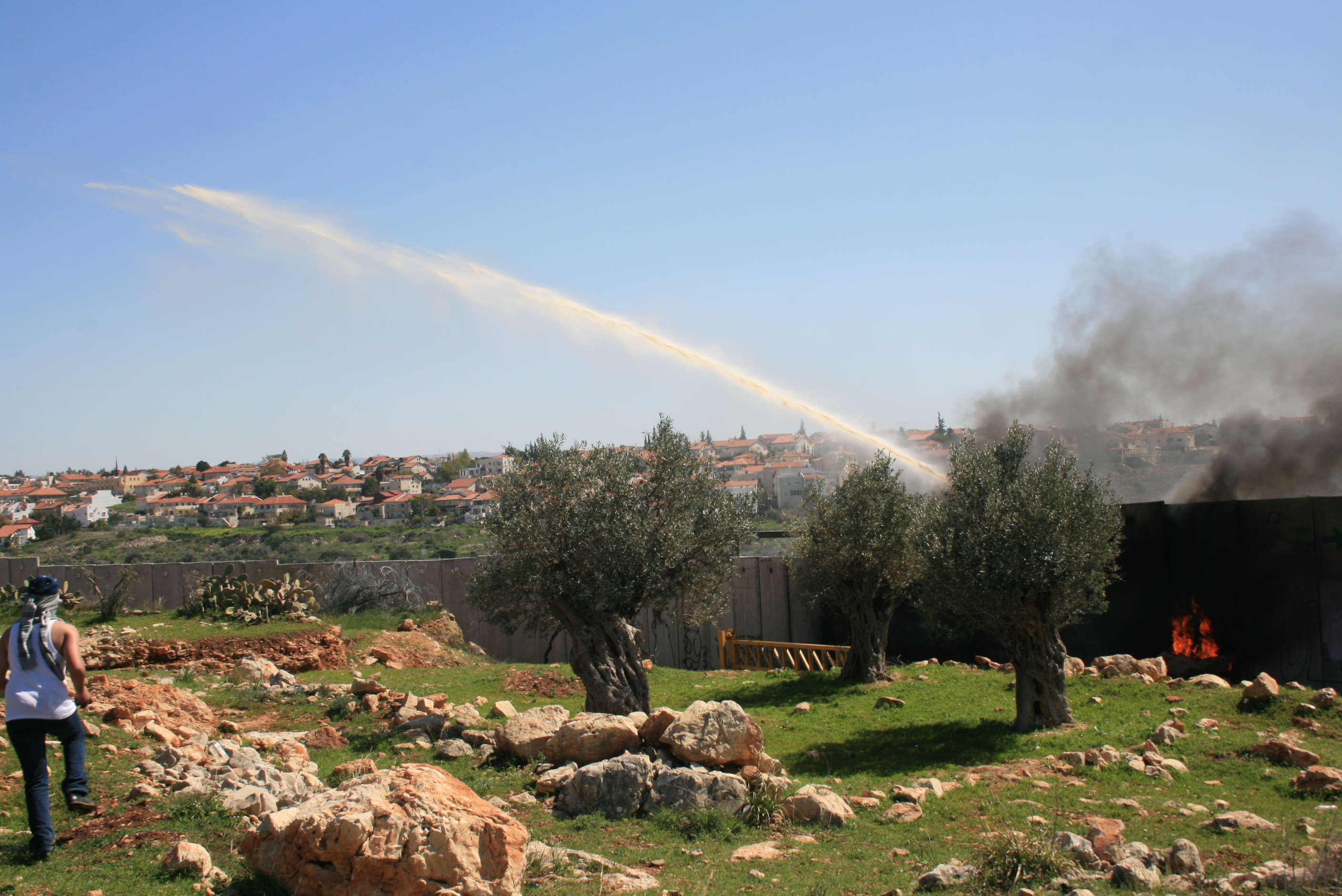
Skunk spraying by Israeli soldiers on Palestinians that protest against the Israeli separation wall, March 2012

In the second week of August 2008, twenty-two unarmed civilians (including eight children) were shot with metal-coated rubber bullets at protests in Ni'lin and Bil'in villages (Ramallah). Israeli forces in the occupied territories have begun using a new method of crowd control in Ni'lin. A mix of weak sewage water with animal manure and chemicals has been nicknamed "skunk" because of its powerful smell; the mix induces vomiting when sprayed on demonstrators.

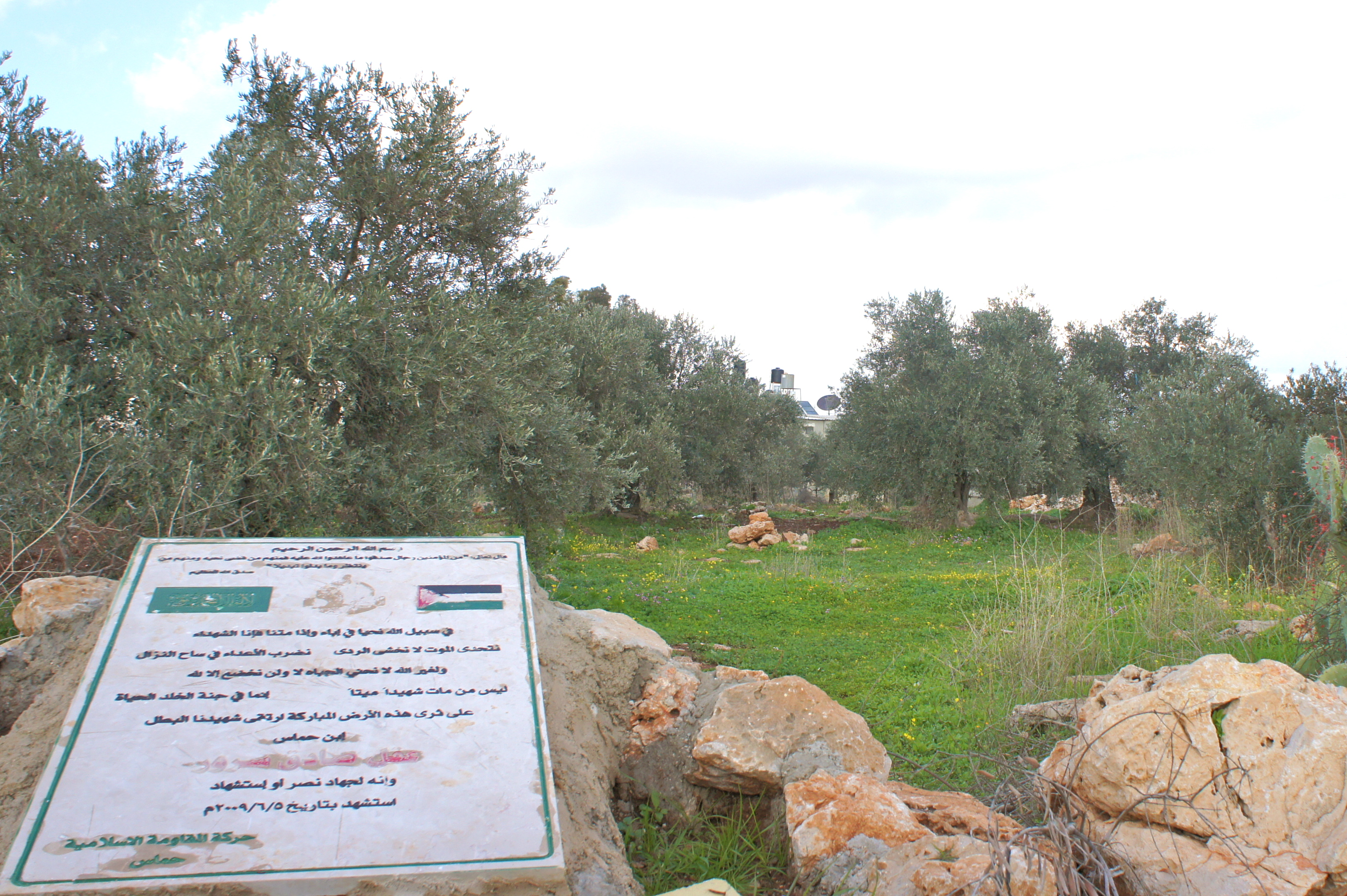
Memorial placed where 36-year-old Yousef Aqel Srour was killed in 2009

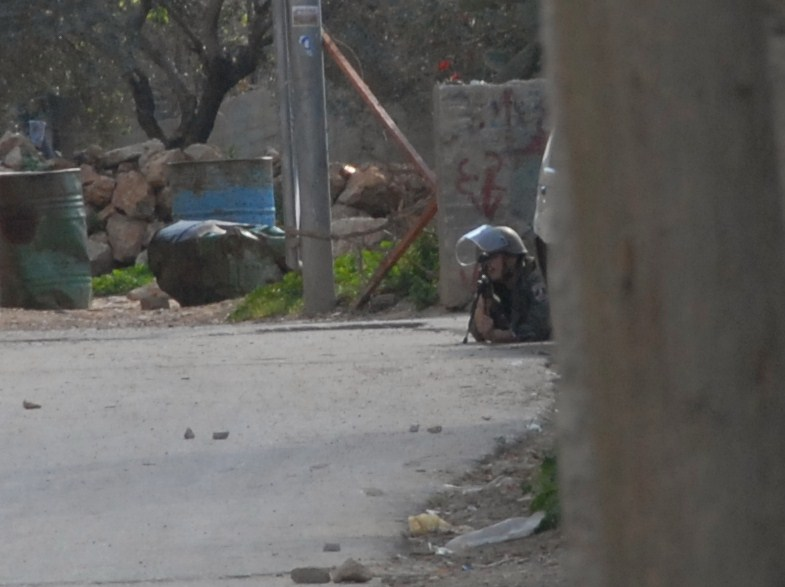
An Israeli soldier in Ni'lin on 6 February 2009

On 28 December, during a demonstration against the Israeli assault on Gaza that had started the previous day, Mohamed Khawaja (19) was shot in the head by the Israeli military, and Arafat Khawaja (22) was shot in the back. Mohamed Srour was shot in the leg. Arafat died on the scene while Mohamed Khawaja was declared braindead in hospital and died on 31 December. These incidents were brought to the attention of the United Nations Fact Finding Mission on the Gaza Conflict by witnesses Mohamed Srour and Jonathan Pollak at the Mission's Public Hearings in Geneva on 5 July 2009.

The regular clashes here came more sharply into the international spotlight when a 38-year-old U.S. citizen named Tristan Anderson, of Oakland, California was struck in the head by a tear gas canister fired by Israeli forces on 13 March 2009, during demonstrations against the barrier. The impact caused massive damage to Anderson's frontal lobe and to his eye. He required several brain surgeries at a Tel Aviv hospital.

On 5 June 2009, Yousef Aqel Srour (36) was shot with 0.22 caliber live ammunition during a demonstration. He was pronounced dead upon arrival at a hospital in Ramallah.

On 6 November 2009, activists marking the twentieth anniversary of the fall of the Berlin Wall managed to topple a small part of the wall that cuts through the village's land; the first time Palestinian demonstrators succeeded in toppling a part of Israel's concrete barrier.

In March 2010, the Israeli army designated Ni'lin, (together with nearby village Bil'in), as a "closed military area" each Friday. This was to last until August 2010.

=== Omri Borberg ===
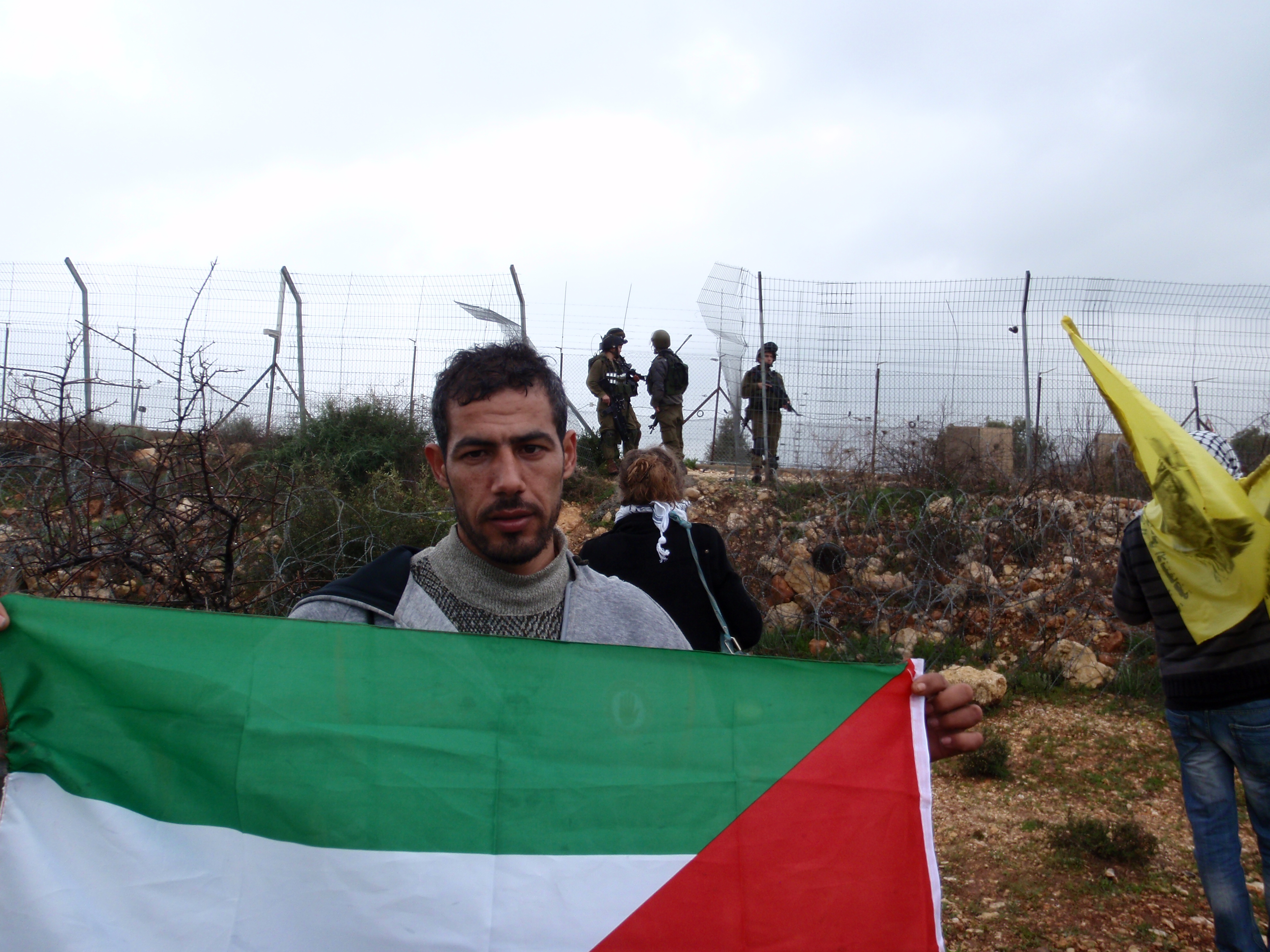
Ashraf Abu Rahma of Bil'in, victim of violence at the hands of Israeli soldiers

On 7 July 2008, 17-year-old Salam Kanaan filmed an incident where an Israeli battalion commander (Lt. Col. Omri Borberg of Armored Battalion, 71) was holding the arm of a handcuffed and blindfolded Palestinian detainee (Ashraf Abu Rahma of Bil'in) while the subordinate shoots the detainee in the foot. A second polygraph test on Tuesday 29 July 2008 has cast doubts on the testimony of Lt. Col Borberg. After meeting with OC Northern Command Maj.-Gen. Gadi Eizenkot, Borberg agreed to take a 10-day leave of absence while IDF Judge Advocate-General (JAG) Brig.-Gen. Avichai Mandelblitt made the decision of whether or not to press charges against the battalion commander. Accused by the army of "severe moral failure", the Battalion commander is to be reassigned to another post and will face the relatively minor charge of "unworthy conduct". Israeli human rights groups B'Tselem, Yesh Din, the Association for Civil Rights, and the Public Committee Against Torture have criticized the Israeli army's disciplining of Borberg as lenient and have asked the Israeli military Judge Advocate General to suspend legal proceedings against both the lieutenant colonel involved and Staff Sergeant "L" who fired the shot to enable a challenge to be mounted against the decision to charge the two with the relatively light offense of "inappropriate conduct". The Ha'aretz editorial comments that:

The opportunity to send a message of total intolerance of shooting a person in shackles has been missed.

Demonstration against the Israeli Separation Wall in Ni'lin, August 2014

On 19 August 2008, the Military hearing against Borberg and Staff Sergeant "L" was suspended following the B'Tselem petition. On 28 September the Israeli high court asked the JAG to reconsider the charges against Borberg and Staff Sergeant "L".

== See also ==
- Ahmadiyya in Israel, of whom the majority are members of the Odeh family, originally from Ni'lin

== Bibliography ==
- Barron, J.B., ed. (1923). Palestine: Report and General Abstracts of the Census of 1922. Government of Palestine.
- Conder, C.R.; Kitchener, H.H. (1882). The Survey of Western Palestine: Memoirs of the Topography, Orography, Hydrography, and Archaeology. Vol. 2. London: Committee of the Palestine Exploration Fund.
- Finkelstein, I.; Lederman, Zvi, eds. (1997). Highlands of many cultures. Tel Aviv: Institute of Archaeology of Tel Aviv University Publications Section. ISBN 965-440-007-3.
- Government of Jordan, Department of Statistics (1964). First Census of Population and Housing. Volume I: Final Tables; General Characteristics of the Population (PDF).
- Government of Palestine, Department of Statistics (1945). Village Statistics, April, 1945.
- Hadawi, S. (1970). Village Statistics of 1945: A Classification of Land and Area ownership in Palestine. Palestine Liberation Organization Research Center.
- Hartmann, M. (1883). "Die Ortschaftenliste des Liwa Jerusalem in dem türkischen Staatskalender für Syrien auf das Jahr 1288 der Flucht (1871)". Zeitschrift des Deutschen Palästina-Vereins. 6: 102–149.
- Hütteroth, W.-D.; Abdulfattah, K. (1977). Historical Geography of Palestine, Transjordan and Southern Syria in the Late 16th Century. Erlanger Geographische Arbeiten, Sonderband 5. Erlangen, Germany: Vorstand der Fränkischen Geographischen Gesellschaft. ISBN 3-920405-41-2.
- Mills, E., ed. (1932). Census of Palestine 1931. Population of Villages, Towns and Administrative Areas. Jerusalem: Government of Palestine.
- Palmer, E.H. (1881). The Survey of Western Palestine: Arabic and English Name Lists Collected During the Survey by Lieutenants Conder and Kitchener, R. E. Transliterated and Explained by E.H. Palmer. Committee of the Palestine Exploration Fund.
- Robinson, E.; Smith, E. (1841). Biblical Researches in Palestine, Mount Sinai and Arabia Petraea: A Journal of Travels in the year 1838. Vol. 3. Boston: Crocker & Brewster.
- Röhricht, R. (1887). "Studien zur mittelalterlichen Geographie und Topographie Syriens". Zeitschrift des Deutschen Palästina-Vereins. 10: 195–344.
- Röhricht, R. (1893). (RRH) Regesta regni Hierosolymitani (MXCVII-MCCXCI) (in Latin). Berlin: Libraria Academica Wageriana.
- Socin, A. (1879). "Alphabetisches Verzeichniss von Ortschaften des Paschalik Jerusalem". Zeitschrift des Deutschen Palästina-Vereins. 2: 135–163.
