= Skunk clownfish =

Skunk clownfish is used to refer to several species of anemonefish that are visually similar and form a species complex:

- Pink skunk clownfish
- Orange skunk clownfish
- Nosestripe clownfish
