= Skunkworks =

Skunkworks or Skunk works may refer to:

- Skunk Works, an official trademark for the Lockheed Martin Advanced Development Programs (formerly Lockheed Advanced Development Projects).
- Skunkworks project, a project typically developed by a small and loosely structured group of people who research and develop a project primarily for the sake of innovation
- Skunkworks (album), alternative rock album by Bruce Dickinson

== Other uses ==
- SCO Skunkware, a collection of open source software.
