= Skunk Creek (Peruque Creek tributary) =

Stream in the US state of Missouri

Skunk Creek is a stream in Warren County in the U.S. state of Missouri. It is a tributary of Peruque Creek.

The stream headwaters arise at 38°46′47″N 91°00′58″W at an elevation of approximately 800 feet. The stream flows generally north passing under Missouri Route M and on for about 2.5 miles to its confluence with Peruque Creek approximately one-half mile southeast of Wright City and I-70 at 38°49′01″N 91°00′27″W at an elevation of 682 feet.

A variant name was "Skunk Branch". The creek was so named on account of skunks in the area.

== See also ==
- List of rivers of Missouri
