= White Mosque of Ramle =

Umayyad-era mosque in Ramla, Israel

White Mosque
- المسجد الأبيض; המסגד הלבן
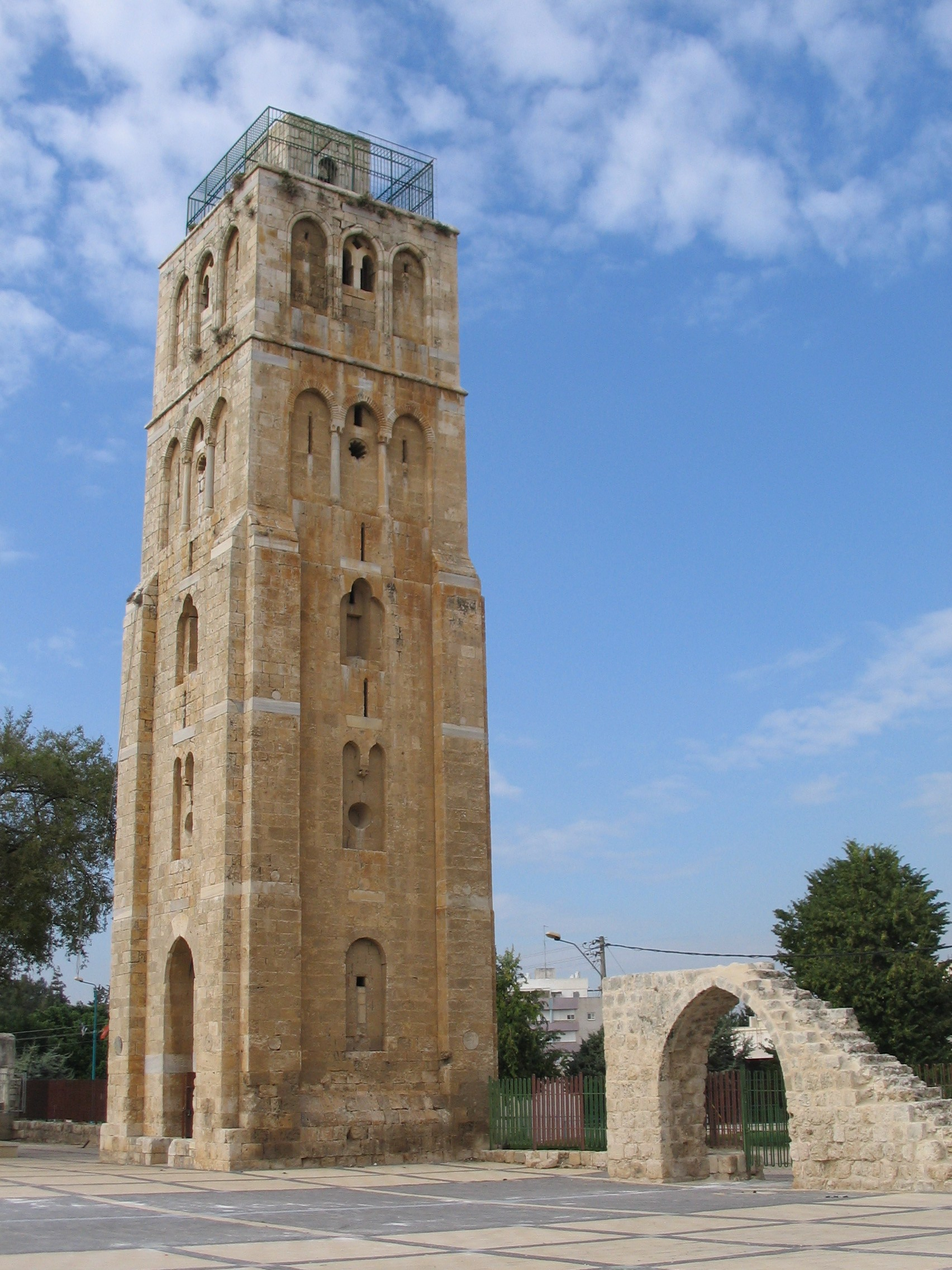
- The minaret, a remnant of the mosque, in 2006

- Location of the former mosque in central Israel

Religion
- Affiliation: Islam (former)
- Ecclesiastical or organisational status: Mosque (former)
- Status: Inactive; (partial ruins)

Location
- Location: Ramla, Central District
- Country: Israel
- Interactive map of White Mosque
- Coordinates: 31°55′39″N 34°51′58″E

Architecture
- Architect: Umar ibn Abd al-Aziz
- Type: Mosque architecture
- Style: Umayyad; Mamluk
- Completed: 717 CE (enclosure); 1047 CE (rebuilt); 1190 CE (second phase); 1268 CE (minaret); 1318 CE (rebuilt); 1408 CE

Specifications
- Dome: One
- Minaret: One
- Minaret height: 27 m (89 ft)
- Shrine: One: Salih (destroyed)
- Materials: Marble; cypress; cedar

The White Mosque (Arabic: المسجد الأبيض, romanized: al-Masjid al-Abyad; Hebrew: המסגד הלבן, romanized: HaMisgad HaLavan) was an Umayyad-era mosque, now in partial ruins, located in Ramle, in central Israel. Only its minaret is still standing. According to local Islamic tradition, the northwestern section of the mosque contained the shrine of an Islamic prophet, Salih.

The minaret is also known as the Tower of the Forty Martyrs. Islamic tradition dating from 1467 CE claims that forty companions of the Islamic prophet Muhammad were buried at the mosque, which influenced an erroneous Western Christian tradition from the 16th century that the White Mosque was originally a church dedicated to the Forty Martyrs of Sebaste.

In 2000, the mosque site was added to the UNESCO World Heritage Tentative List.

== History ==
=== First phase ===
Construction on the White Mosque was initiated by the Umayyad governor (and future caliph) Sulayman ibn Abd al-Malik in 715–717 CE, and was completed by his successor Umar II in 720. The mosque was constructed of marble, while its courtyard was made of other local stone. Some two-and-a-half centuries later, Al-Maqdisi (c. 945/946–991) described it as follows:

The chief mosque of al-Ramla is in the market, and it is even more beautiful and graceful than that of Damascus (Umayyad Mosque). It is called al-Abyad the White Mosque. In all Islam there is found no finer mihrab (prayer niche) than the one here, and its pulpit is the most splendid to be seen after that of Jerusalem; also it possesses a beautiful minaret, built by the caliph Hisham ibn Abd al-Malik. I have heard my uncle relate that when this caliph was about to build the minaret, it was reported to him that the Christians possessed columns of marble, at this time lying buried beneath the sand, which they had prepared for the Church of Baliʾah (Abu Ghosh). Thereupon the caliph Hisham informed the Christians that either they must show him where these columns lay, or that he would demolish their church at Lydda (Church of Saint George), and employ its columns for the building of his mosque. So the Christians pointed out where they had buried their columns. They are very thick, and tall, and beautiful. The covered portion (or main building) of the mosque is flagged with marble, and the court with other stone, all carefully laid together. The gates of the main-building are made of cypress-wood and cedar, carved in the inner parts, and very beautiful in appearance.

=== Reconstructions ===
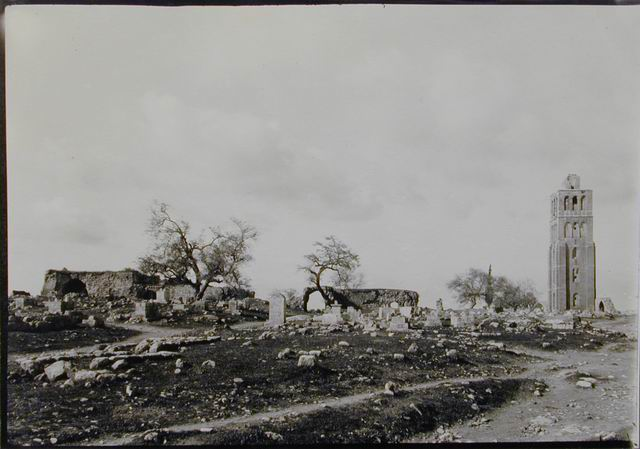
The White Mosque from the east, early 20th century

An earthquake in January 1034 destroyed the mosque, "leaving it in a heap of ruins", along with a third of the city. In 1047, Nasir Khusraw reported that the mosque had been rebuilt.

After the initial reconstruction, Saladin ordered in 1190 one of his outstanding architects, Ilyas Ibn ʿAbd Allah, to supervise what is considered the second construction phase of the mosque. Ilyas built the mosque's western side and the western enclosure wall, together with the central wudu building.

The third phase, in 1267–1268, began after the final fall of the Christian Kingdom of Jerusalem. On the orders of the Mamluk sultan al-Zahir Baibars, the mosque was rededicated and modified by adding the minaret, the dome, a new pulpit and prayer niche, a portico east of the minaret, and two halls outside the enclosure. Later Mamluk sultan al-Nasir Muhammad renovated the minaret after an earthquake in October 1318. The Mamluks again commissioned restoration works in 1408.

The last restoration of the White Mosque of Ramle took place during between 1844-1918. Since then, the mosque has been mostly destroyed, except for its minaret.

== Architecture ==
=== Outline and prayer hall ===
The White Mosque's compound is rectangular, 93 by 84 meters (305 by 276 ft), and oriented to the cardinal points. A large, open sahn is surrounded by built structures and walls.

The 12-meter-wide (39 ft) prayer hall stands along the southern wall, with twelve openings northwards to the sahn. Its ceiling consists of cross-vaults supported by a central row of pillars. The ceiling and the western part of the prayer hall are 12th-century additions made by Saladin, who also had a new mihrab (prayer niche) built.

Much of the mosque was built in white marble with cypress and cedar wood used for the doors. Of its four facades, the eastern one is in disrepair.

=== Minaret ===
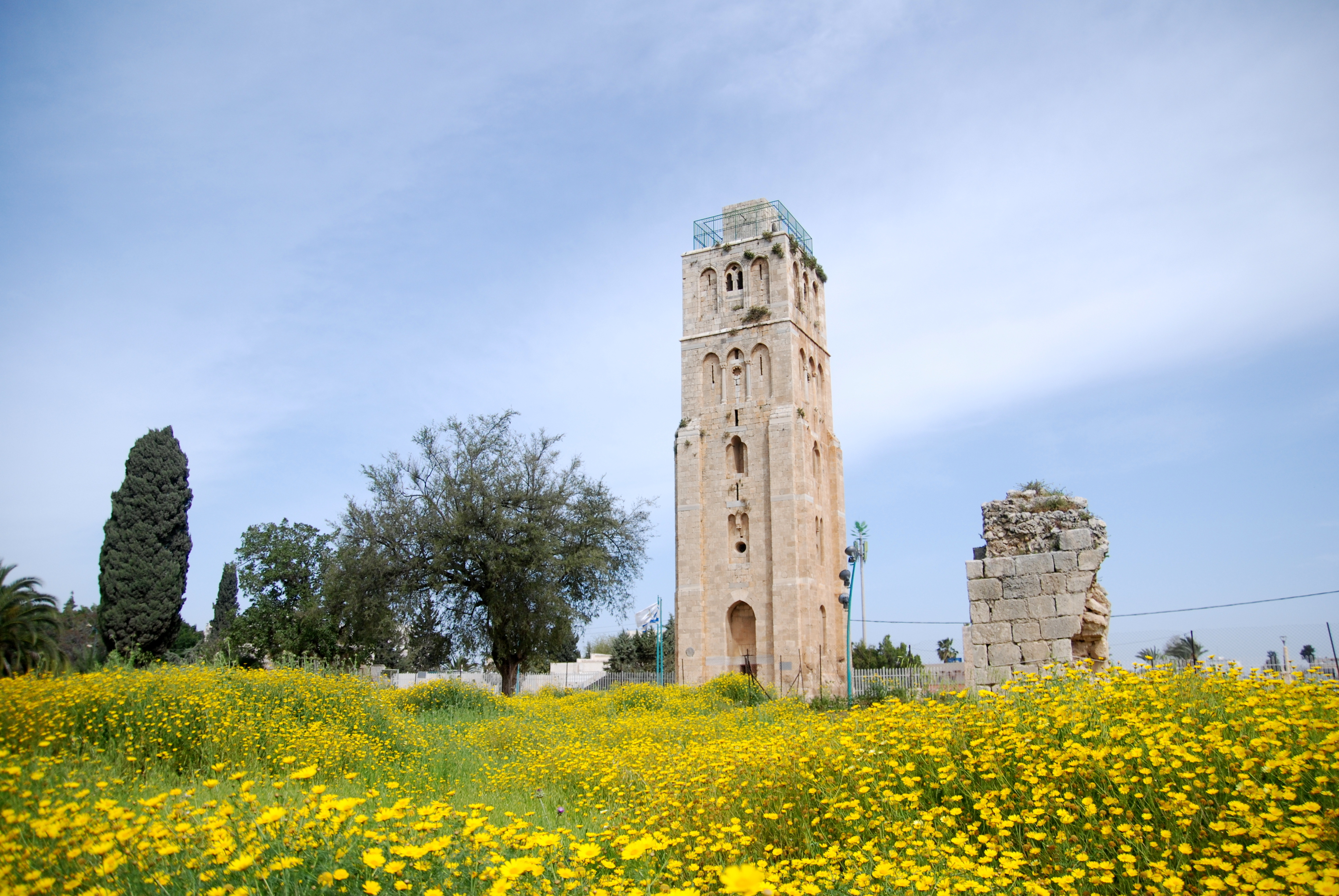
The White Tower after January rains

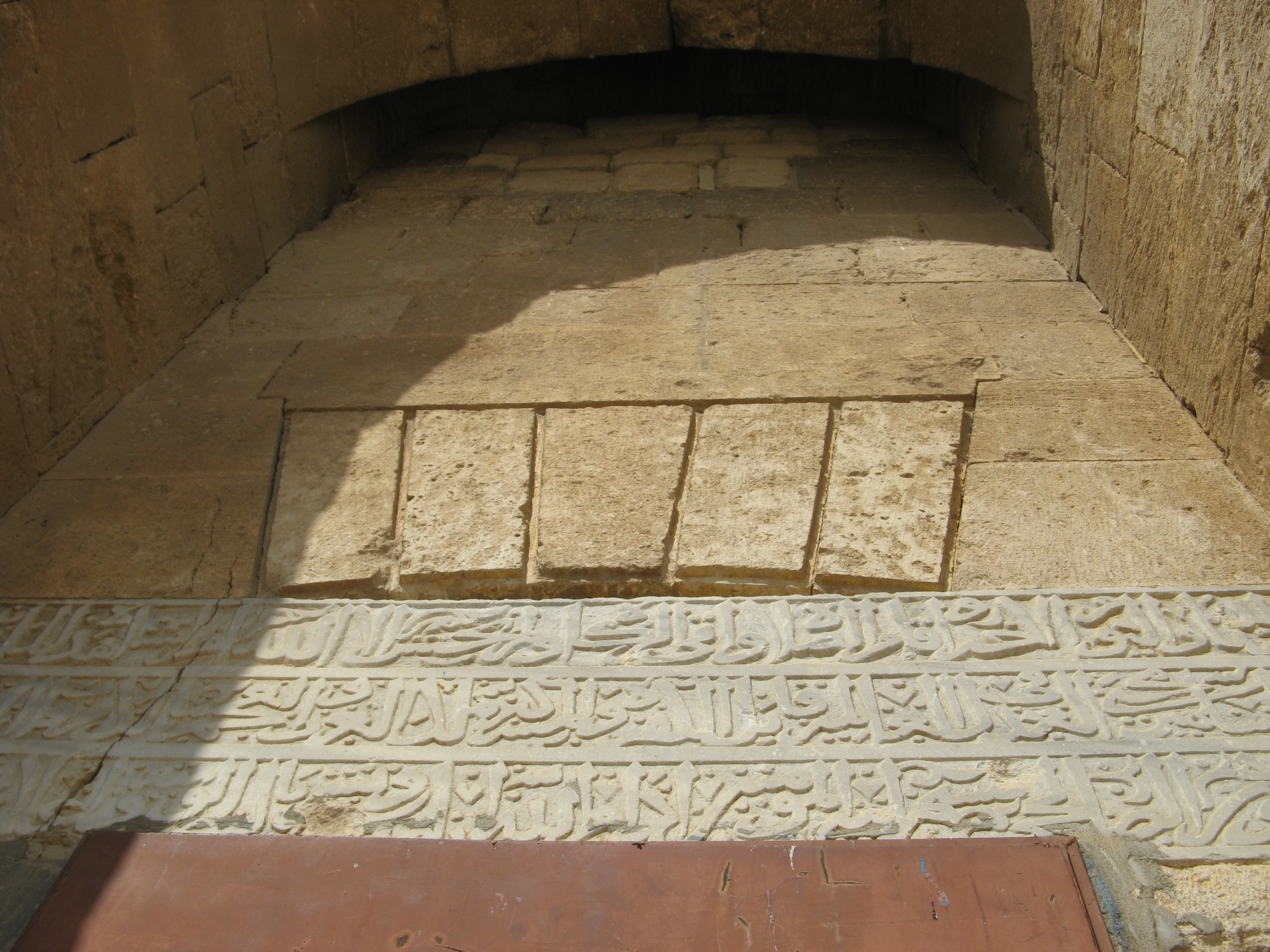
Arabic inscription on the White Tower

The current Mamluk-built minaret, officially the Tower of the Forty Martyrs, also known as "The White Tower", stands on the northern side of the mosque compound, is square in shape and five stories high, each adorned with window niches, and has a balcony towards the top. The minaret was probably influenced by Crusader-era Christian architecture, but it was built by the Mamluks. 27 meters (89 ft) tall, it is accessed via a staircase with 125 steps and contains small rooms, which could be used for resting or as study rooms.

Al-Maqdisi mentioned a minaret in the 10th century. There is speculation about a minaret predating the Mamluk one that may have been located closer to the centre of the mosque, as remnants of a square foundation have been found there. However, this may have been just a fountain.

=== Courtyard and cisterns ===
Below the central courtyard of the mosque there are three large and well-preserved underground cisterns with barrel-vaults carried by pillars. Two cisterns (the southern and western ones) were filled by an underground water duct probably connected to the aqueduct built simultaneously with the mosque and city, which brought spring water (probably from the vicinity of Gezer to the east). The third eastern cistern was supplied by runoff rainwater. The reservoirs provided water for worshippers at the mosque and filled the pool for wudu at the center of the courtyard, of which only the foundation remains today.

== Archaeological excavations ==
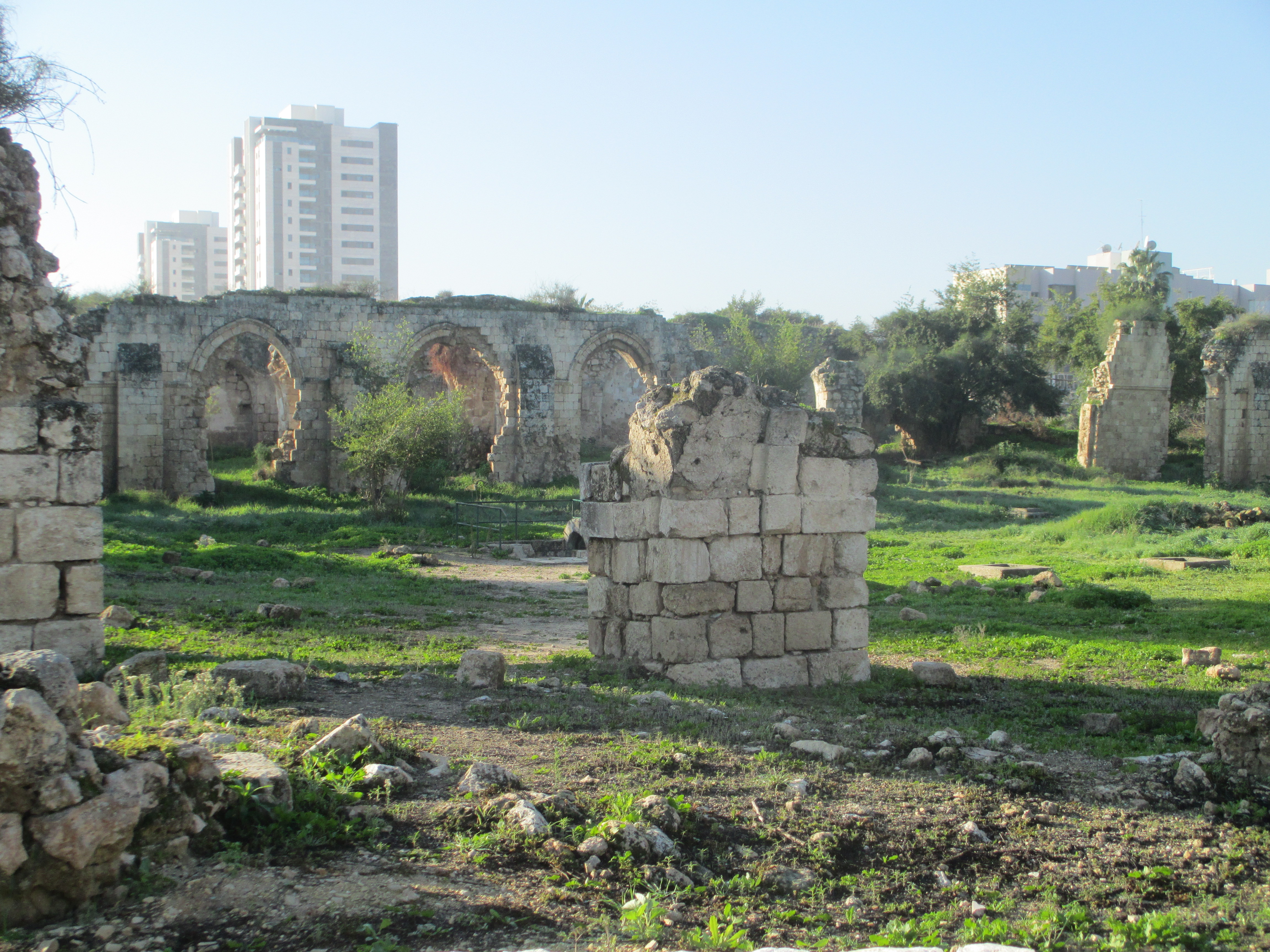
Remains of the White Mosque in Ramla (pictured in 2014) built by Sulayman and his cousin and successor Umar II

Excavations conducted by the State of Israel in 1949 on behalf of the Ministry of Religious Services and the Israel Department of Antiquities and Museums revealed that the mosque enclosure was built in the form of a quadrangle and included the mosque itself; two porticoes along the quadrangle's east and west walls; the north wall; the minaret; an unidentified building in the centre to the area; and three subterranean cisterns. The mosque was a broad-house, with a qibla facing Mecca. Two inscriptions were found that mention repairs to the mosque: the first relates that sultan Baibars built a dome over the minaret and added a door; the second inscription states that in 1408, Seif ed-Din Baighut ez-Zahiri had the walls of the southern cistern coated with plaster.

== See also ==
- Islam in Israel
- List of mosques in Israel
