= Battle of Ramla =

Battle Ramla may refer to three battles fought near Ramla, now in Israel:

- Battle of Ramla (1101)
- Battle of Ramla (1102)
- Battle of Ramla (1105)

== See also ==
- 1948 Palestinian expulsion from Lydda and Ramle
